= Speke (surname) =

Speke is an English surname. Notable people with the surname include:

- Anne Speke, Lady North or Anne North, Countess of Guilford (1740–1797), daughter of George Speke (died 1753)
- George Speke (politician, died 1584) (c.1530–1584), English politician
- George Speke (politician, died 1689) (1623–1689), English politician
- George Speke (politician, died 1753) (c. 1686–1753), British politician, MP for Milborne Port, for Taunton, and for Wells
- Sir George Speke, 2nd Baronet (1653–1683), English politician
- Hugh Speke (1656–c.1724), English writer and agitator
- Sir Hugh Speke, 1st Baronet (died 1661), English politician
- John Hanning Speke (1827–1864), English explorer and army officer
- John Speke (1442–1518), English sheriff
- Mary Speke (c.1625–1697), English nonconformist patron and political activist

== See also ==
- Speke (disambiguation)
