= The Crab with the Golden Claws (film) =

- Film poster
- Directed by: Claude Misonne
- Written by: João B. Michiels
- Produced by: Wilfried Bouchery
- Cinematography: B. Michel; A. Dunil; E. Bernstein
- Edited by: A. Leduc
- Music by: G. Bethune; A. Ducat
- Release date: 11 January 1947 (Belgium)
- Running time: 58 minutes
- Country: Belgium
- Language: French

The Crab with the Golden Claws (French: Le crabe aux pinces d'or) is a 1947 Belgian stop motion crime film produced by Wilfried Bouchery for Films Claude Misonne and based on the comic book of the same name from The Adventures of Tintin by Hergé. This was the first Tintin story to be adapted into a movie and follows the story of the comic almost exactly.

There were only two theatrical screenings of the film; the first at the ABC Cinema on 11 January 1947 for a group of special invited guests, while the other one was shown in public on 21 December of that year, before Bouchery declared bankruptcy and fled to Argentina. All of the equipment was seized and a copy of the film is currently stored at Belgium's Cinémathèque Royale. The copy is available to watch for paying members of the Tintin club.

The main premise of the film is drug smuggling by ship. While investigating a death by drowning, Tintin discovers that the transport of crab meat by the ship Karaboudjan is actually a cover for the transport of drugs. The only member of the crew who is actually unaware of the drug trafficking operation is Captain Haddock, the nominal leader of the crew.

== Plot ==
Tintin finds himself involved in a mystery of a drowned man, a regular tin of crab meat, and the name of a ship called the Karaboudjan scribbled on a piece of paper inside of the man's pockets. Upon investigating the ship, Tintin discovers that the shipment of tin cans contains not crab meat, but drugs. After learning about the ship's shady business, Tintin ends up becoming prisoner on the ship which already cast off from the port. The only way for Tintin to escape is by heading for dry land by lifeboat, and the only person to aid him is the ship's whisky-guzzling Captain Haddock who is the only one on board not aware that his crew is trafficking drugs right under his nose.

A screenshot of the film

== Release in DVD ==
On 14 May 2008, the film was released on PAL DVD in France by Fox Pathe Europa.

== See also ==
- List of animated feature-length films
- List of stop-motion films
