= The Crab with the Golden Claws =

Comic album by Belgian cartoonist Hergé

The Crab with the Golden Claws (Le Crabe aux pinces d'or)
- Cover of the English edition
- Date: 1941 (black and white); 1943 (colour)
- Series: The Adventures of Tintin
- Publisher: Casterman

Creative team
- Creator: Hergé

Original publication
- Published in: Le Soir Jeunesse (supplement to Le Soir), then Le Soir
- Date of publication: 17 October 1940 – 18 October 1941
- Language: French

Translation
- Publisher: Methuen
- Date: 1958
- Translator: Leslie Lonsdale-Cooper; Michael Turner

Chronology
- Preceded by: King Ottokar's Sceptre (1939); Land of Black Gold (1939) (abandoned)
- Followed by: The Shooting Star (1942)

The Crab with the Golden Claws (French: Le Crabe aux pinces d'or) is the ninth volume of The Adventures of Tintin, the comics series by Belgian cartoonist Hergé. The story was serialised weekly in Le Soir Jeunesse, the children's supplement to Le Soir, Belgium's leading francophone newspaper, from October 1940 to October 1941 amidst the German occupation of Belgium during World War II. Partway through serialisation, Le Soir Jeunesse was cancelled and the story began to be serialised daily in the pages of Le Soir. The story tells of young Belgian reporter Tintin and his dog Snowy, who travel to Morocco to pursue the international opium smugglers. The story marks the first appearance of main character Captain Haddock.

The Crab with the Golden Claws was published in book form shortly after its conclusion. Hergé continued The Adventures of Tintin with The Shooting Star, while the series itself became a defining part of the Franco-Belgian comics tradition. In 1943, Hergé coloured and redrew the book in his distinctive ligne-claire style for Casterman's republication. The Crab with the Golden Claws introduces the supporting character Captain Haddock, who became a major fixture of the series. The book is the first Tintin adventure published in the United States and the first to be adapted into a motion picture. The Crab with the Golden Claws was adapted for the 1947 stop motion film of the same name, the 1956 Belvision Studios animation Hergé's Adventures of Tintin, the 1991 Ellipse/Nelvana animated series The Adventures of Tintin, the feature film The Adventures of Tintin (2011) directed by Steven Spielberg, and the film's tie-in video game.

== Synopsis ==
Tintin is informed by Thomson and Thompson of a case involving a drowned sailor, found with a scrap of paper from what appears to be a tin of crab meat with the word "Karaboudjan" scrawled on it. His subsequent investigation and the kidnapping of a Japanese man interested in giving him a letter leads Tintin to a ship called the Karaboudjan, where he is abducted by a syndicate of criminals who have hidden opium in the crab tins. Tintin escapes from his locked room after Snowy chews through his bonds and encounters Captain Haddock, an alcoholic sea captain, who is manipulated by his first mate, Allan, and is unaware of his crew's criminal activities. Fooling Allan and his men, Tintin, Snowy, and Haddock escape the ship in a lifeboat after sending a radio message to the police.

Stranded at sea, a seaplane tries to attack them; Tintin and the Captain hijack the plane, tie up the pilots, and try to reach Spain. Haddock's drunken behaviour in a storm causes them to crash-land in the Sahara desert instead, where the pilots escape. After trekking across the desert and nearly dying of dehydration, Tintin and Haddock are rescued and taken to a French outpost, where they hear on the radio that the storm has sunk the Karaboudjan. They travel to Bagghar, a Moroccan port, and are attacked by Tuareg tribesmen along the way. In Bagghar, the Captain recognises the Karaboudjan disguised as another ship, but he is kidnapped by his former crewmen. Meanwhile, Tintin meets Thomson and Thompson and learn that wealthy merchant Omar Ben Salaad sells the crab tins that are used to smuggle the opium.

While Thomson and Thompson discreetly investigate Ben Salaad, Tintin tracks down Allan and the rest of the gang and saves Captain Haddock, but they both become intoxicated by the fumes from wine barrels breached in a shootout with the villains. Haddock chases a gang-member from the cellar to an entrance behind a bookcase in Salaad's house. Upon sobering up, Tintin discovers a necklace of a crab with golden claws on the now-subdued owner of the wine cellar, Omar ben Salaad, and realizes that he is the leader of the drug cartel. Allan steals a boat and tries to escape, but Tintin captures him. The police arrest the gang and free the Japanese man, who introduces himself as Bunji Kuraki, a police detective who was trying to warn Tintin of the group he was up against. He had been investigating the sailor on Haddock's crew who drowned; the sailor was on the verge of bringing him opium before he was eliminated. Turning on the radio, Tintin learns that, thanks to him, the entire organisation of the Crab with the Golden Claws is behind bars.

== History ==
=== Background ===
The Crab with the Golden Claws was the first of The Adventures of Tintin serials to be published by Le Soir, Belgium's largest Francophone daily newspaper. Hergé's previous Tintin stories had all been created for the Catholic publication Le Vingtième Siècle, but after the German occupation of Belgium in 1940, the Nazi authorities had forced it to cease publication. Land of Black Gold, the story that Hergé had been serialising at the time, had to be abandoned. (Note: Land of Black Gold would be successfully re-attempted ten years later, in 1950.) The German authorities had permitted Le Soir to reopen, but it remained firmly under Nazi control, supporting the German war effort and espousing anti-Semitism. (Note: Le Soir as published during the occupation was known by Belgians as Le Soir volé (The Stolen Soir) as it was published without the approval of its original owners, Rossel & Cie, who regained ownership after the Liberation.) Some Belgians were upset that Hergé was willing to work for a newspaper controlled by the occupying Nazi administration, but he was enticed by the size of Le Soir's readership, which reached 600,000, far more than what Le Vingtième Siècle had been able to accomplish. After joining Le Soir on 15 October 1940, Hergé was appointed editor of its new children's supplement, Le Soir Jeunesse. The first issue was published with a large announcement across the cover: "Tintin et Milou sont revenus!" ("Tintin and Snowy are back!")

Faced with the reality of Nazi oversight, Hergé abandoned the overt political themes that had pervaded much of his earlier work, instead adopting a policy of neutrality. Tintin scholar Harry Thompson has observed that without the need to satirise political types, "Hergé was now concentrating more on plot and on developing a new style of character comedy. The public reacted positively".

=== Publication ===
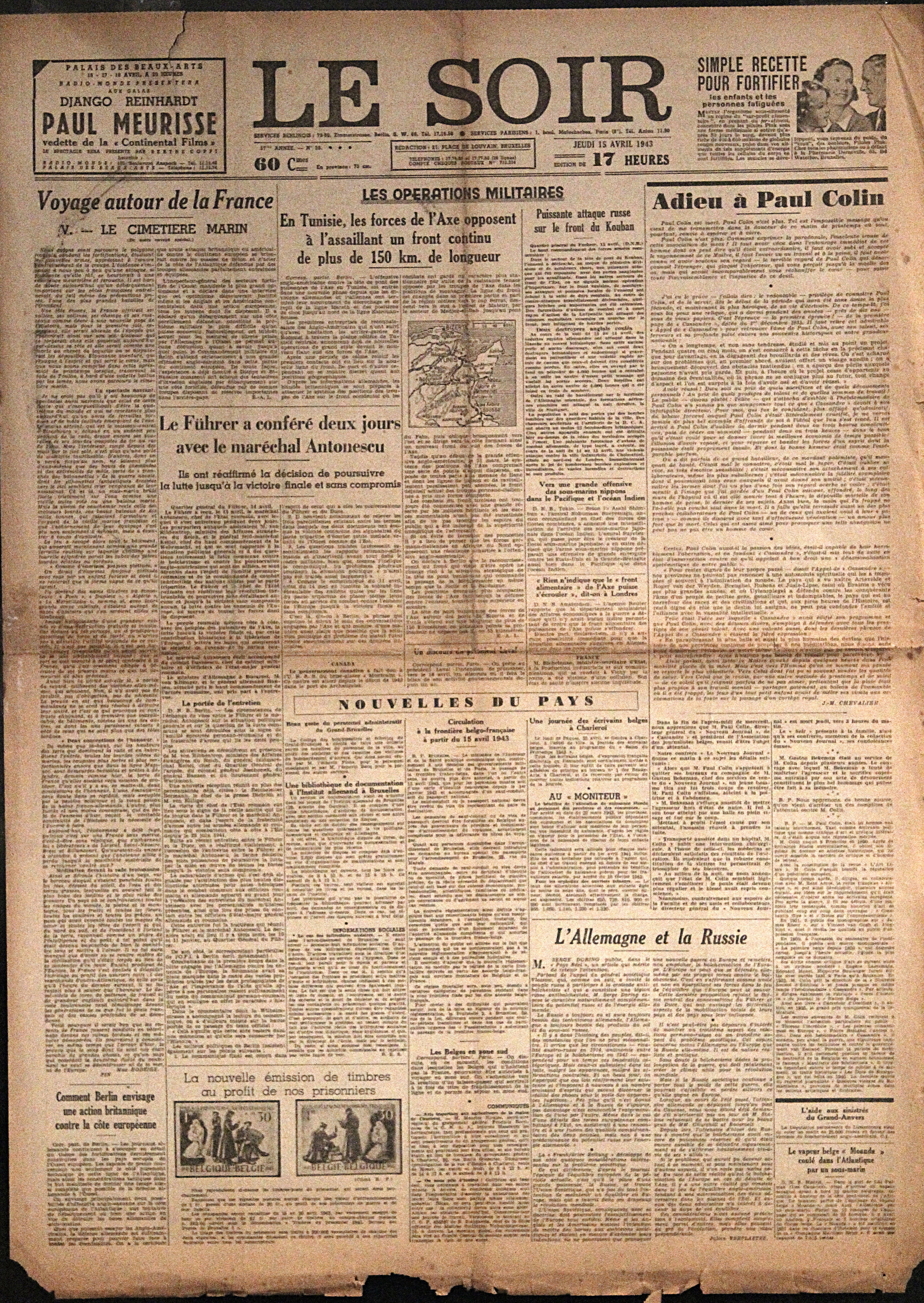
A 1943 copy of Le Soir dating to the occupation

The Crab with the Golden Claws began serialisation in Le Soir Jeunesse on 17 October 1940. However, on 8 May 1941, a paper shortage caused by the ongoing war led to Le Soir Jeunesse being reduced to four pages, with the length of the weekly Tintin strip being cut by two-thirds. Several weeks later, on 3 September, the supplement disappeared altogether, with The Crab with the Golden Claws being moved into Le Soir itself in September, where it became a daily strip. As a result, Hergé was forced to alter the pace at which his narrative moved, as he had to hold the reader's attention at the end of every line. As with earlier Adventures of Tintin, the story was later serialised in France in the Catholic newspaper Cœurs Vaillants from 21 June 1942.

Following serialisation, Casterman published the story in book form in 1941; it was the last black-and-white Tintin volume to be released. For this collected edition, Hergé considered renaming the story The Red Crab (echoing earlier adventures The Blue Lotus and The Black Island) before re-settling on the original title. Hergé was annoyed when Casterman sent the book to the printers without his final approval. Nevertheless, as a result of Le Soir's publicity, book sales markedly increased, to the extent that most of the prior Adventures of Tintin were reprinted as a result, although the German authorities made two exceptions: Tintin in America and The Black Island could not be reprinted at the time because they were set in the United States and Britain respectively, both of which were in conflict with Germany.

In February 1942, Casterman suggested to Hergé that his books be published in a new format; 62-pages rather than the former 100 to 130 pages, and now in full colour rather than black-and-white. He agreed to this, and in 1943 The Crab with the Golden Claws was re-edited and coloured for publication as an album in 1944. Due to the changes in how the adventure had been serialised at Le Soir, the album at this juncture was only 58 pages long, so Hergé filled the missing pages with four full-page colour frames to bring it to the new 62-page format.

When the book was published in America, Hergé was asked to redraw scenes that depicted the mixing of black and white races. Initially, Jumbo was black (left), while in the redrawn edition he is white (right).

In the 1960s, The Crab with the Golden Claws, along with King Ottokar's Sceptre, became the first Tintin adventures to be published in the United States, by Golden Press. Casterman, working with the American publisher Western Publishing, made a number of changes: Jumbo, the sailor who Tintin leaves bound and gagged in Captain Haddock's cabin, as well as another man who beats Haddock in the cellar, could not be black Africans as depicted in the original; these were changed to a white sailor and an Arab due to the American publisher's concerns depicting blacks and whites mixing together. The accompanying text was not changed and Haddock still refers to the man who beat him as a "Negro". Also by request of the Americans, scenes of Haddock drinking directly from bottles of whiskey on the lifeboat and the plane were blanked out, keeping only the text. The edited albums later had their blanked areas redrawn by Hergé to be more acceptable, and they appear this way in published editions around the world.

Hergé deemed this frame from the story to be one of his two favourites from the entire Adventures of Tintin.

Casterman republished the original black-and-white version of the story in 1980, as part of the fourth volume in their Archives Hergé collection. In 1989, they then published a facsimile version of that first edition. The Crab with the Golden Claws contains one of Hergé's two favourite illustrations from The Adventures of Tintin. It depicts Berbers reacting to Haddock's manic ravings, becoming terrified of him and running away. (Note: The illustration is in the second upper left frame on page 38.) Hergé described the action as "a series of movements, broken up and distributed among several characters. It could have been the same individual, lying down first, then getting up slowly, hesitating and finally running away. It's like a short cut in space and time".

=== Inspirations ===
The Crab with the Golden Claws introduced the character of Captain Haddock. His first appearance in Le Soir was in a strip adjacent to an advert for the anti-Semitic German film, Jud Süß. Hergé chose the name "Haddock" for the character after his wife, Germaine Remi, mentioned "a sad English fish" during a meal.

The inclusion of the Japanese police detective Bunji Kuraki as an ally of Tintin's in this story was possibly designed to counterbalance Hergé's portrayal of the Japanese as the antagonists in his earlier story, The Blue Lotus, particularly given that the occupying government was allied with Japan at the time. The use of Morocco as a setting was likely influenced by The White Squadron, a novel by French writer Joseph Peyré, which had been adapted into an Italian film in 1936 (Hergé had read the novel and seen the film). The depiction of the French Foreign Legion in North Africa was possibly influenced by P. C. Wren's novel Beau Geste (1925) or its cinematic adaptations in 1926, 1928, and 1939.

Whereas Hergé's use of Chinese in The Blue Lotus had been correct, the Arabic script employed in The Crab with the Golden Claws was intentionally fictitious. Many of the place names featured in the series are puns: the town of Kefheir alludes to the French Que faire? ("what to do?") while the port of Bagghar derives from the French bagarre (scrape, or fight). The name of Omar ben Salaad is a pun on salade de homard, the French for "lobster salad".

== Critical analysis ==
Some critics see The Crab with the Golden Claws as a turning point for The Adventures of Tintin, owing to its introduction of Captain Haddock. Hergé biographer Benoît Peeters wrote that he is tempted to define this particular story by Haddock's debut, as it is he who "makes this book so memorable", being a "formidable narrative element" who "profoundly changed the spirit of the series" and caused its "rebirth". Tintin scholar Michael Farr has asserted that the arrival of Haddock was the most "remarkable" element of the story, offering the series "tremendous new potential". Jean-Marie Apostolidès of Stanford University, in a psychoanalytical review, commented that Crab witnessed Tintin's "real entrance into the community of human beings" as he gains an "older brother" in Haddock.

Critics vary in their opinion of the work as a whole. Hergé biographer Pierre Assouline commented that The Crab with the Golden Claws has "a certain charm" stemming from its use of "exoticism and colonial nostalgia, for the French especially, evoking their holdings in North Africa". But Jean-Marc Lofficier and Randy Lofficier have described the story as "a thinly-disguised remake of Cigars of the Pharaoh" (an earlier adventure first serialised in 1934): both feature the smuggling of opium, in crab tins and cigars respectively, as well as "desert treks, hostile tribes and, at the end, the infiltrating of a secret underground lair". The Lofficiers also opined that although the story represented "a turning point in Hergé's career" artistically, because he had to switch to a daily format in Le Soir, the final third of the story "seems rushed" as a result. Adding that the inclusion of a Japanese detective investigating drug smuggling in the Mediterranean makes no sense within the context of 1940s Europe, they ultimately awarded the story three out of five stars.

"As a fun exercise, try to do a 'vulgar' scan of the whole oeuvre. You will pick up on the scenes in The Crab with the Golden Claws where Haddock, delirious with dehydration, pictures Tintin as a bottle of champagne ready to gush and Tintin, himself dreaming that he has been trapped inside a bottle, screams as the Captain, wielding a giant corkscrew, penetrates and screws him".

— Tom McCarthy, 2006

Literary critics have been fascinated by the story's dream sequences, which Michael Farr believed to reflect the popularity of surrealism at the time. In their studies of Tintin, both Jean-Marie Apostolidès and Tom McCarthy argued that the dream sequences imply a homoerotic subtext between Haddock and Tintin: in one, Haddock envisions Tintin as a champagne bottle frothing at the top (thereby symbolising an ejaculating penis), while in the other, Tintin dreams that he is trapped inside a bottle, with Haddock about to stick a corkscrew into him (thereby symbolising sexual penetration). However, Apostolidès notes, in both instances the pair are prevented from realising their sexual fantasies.

Tom McCarthy noted that Tintin being led into a mystery via the chance finding of a tin can on a Belgian street is representative of the recurring theme of "Tintin the detective" found throughout the series.

== Adaptations ==
In 1947, the first Tintin motion picture was created: the stop motion-animated feature film The Crab with the Golden Claws, faithfully adapted by producer Wilfried Bouchery for Films Claude Misonne. It was first shown at the ABC Cinema on 11 January for a group of invited guests. It was screened publicly only once, on 21 December of that year, before Bouchery declared bankruptcy and fled to Argentina.

In 1957, the animation company Belvision Studios produced a string of colour adaptations based upon Hergé's original comics, adapting eight of the Adventures into a series of daily five-minute episodes. The Crab with the Golden Claws was the fifth such story to be adapted, being directed by Ray Goossens and written by Greg, himself a well-known cartoonist who in later years would become editor-in-chief of Tintin magazine.

In 1991, a second animated series based upon The Adventures of Tintin was produced, this time as a collaboration between the French studio Ellipse and the Canadian animation company Nelvana. Adapting 21 of the stories into a series of episodes, each 42 minutes long, with most stories spanning two episodes, The Crab with the Golden Claws was the seventh story produced in the series. Directed by Stéphane Bernasconi, critics have praised the series for being "generally faithful", with compositions having been actually directly taken from the panels in the original comic book.

A 2011 motion capture feature film directed by Steven Spielberg and produced by Peter Jackson was released in most of the world October–November 2011, under the title The Adventures of Tintin: The Secret of the Unicorn, and in the US on 21 December, where it was simply titled The Adventures of Tintin. The film is partially based on The Crab with the Golden Claws, combined with elements of The Secret of the Unicorn and Red Rackham's Treasure. A video-game tie-in to the movie was released in October 2011.

== In popular culture ==
In The Simpsons episode "In the Name of the Grandfather", Bart Simpson makes a derogatory remark about Belgium, causing his mother Marge to threaten him with "taking his Tintins away", whereupon Bart clutches a copy of the Tintin album The Crab with the Golden Claws to his chest, promising he'll behave.
