= The Adventures of Tintin: The Secret of the Unicorn (video game) =

2011 video game

- European cover of the game
- Developer: Ubisoft Montpellier (Note: Nintendo 3DS version developed by Ubisoft Barcelona.) Gameloft Barcelona
- Publishers: Ubisoft; Gameloft (iOS, Android)
- Directors: Jacques Exertier; Christophe Pic
- Producer: Cyril Erbin
- Artist: Hubert Chevillard
- Writer: Alain Remy
- Composers: Christophe Héral; Maxime Goulet (Gameloft composer, mobile version)
- Platforms: Microsoft Windows, Nintendo 3DS, PlayStation 3, Wii, Xbox 360, iOS, Android, Symbian^3
- Release: EU: 21 October 2011; AU: 1 December 2011; NA: 6 December 2011; iOS & Android: WW: 31 October 2011; Symbian: WW: 11 January 2012
- Genres: Action-adventure, platformer, stealth
- Mode: Single-player

The Adventures of Tintin: The Secret of the Unicorn (French: Les Aventures de Tintin: Le Secret de La Licorne, known as The Adventures of Tintin: The Game in North America) is an action-adventure, platforming video game based on the film The Adventures of Tintin (2011), which itself is based on the comic series of the same name, the comics series by Belgian cartoonist Hergé. The game was released for Microsoft Windows, Nintendo 3DS, PlayStation 3, Wii and Xbox 360 on 21 October 2011 in Europe, on 1 December in Australia and on 6 December in North America. The game was developed by Ubisoft Montpellier (and for the mobile version by Gameloft Barcelona), working in collaboration with the producers of the film, and published by Ubisoft. The iOS, Android and Symbian^3 versions were published by Gameloft and released on the App Store and Android Market on 31 October 2011, and on the Ovi Store on 11 January 2012. The online services for the game were shut down on 6 October 2015.

== Gameplay ==
The game is a 2D platformer with puzzle elements, although there are several other level types; flying levels where the player controls a Beechcraft, driving levels where the player controls a motorcycle and sword fighting levels. The player controls Tintin for the majority of the game, although in some sections, Snowy can be controlled, and in the final battle, the player controls Captain Haddock. Snowy has the ability to follow Tintin's scent, as well as the scent of other humans and creatures, and can scare harmful creatures away with a bark. Tintin can punch enemies and climb ladders. Whereas Tintin can only attack using punches, Haddock can also use a sword to fight. The game also includes an offline co-op mode set in Captain Haddock's nightmares, where Tintin, Haddock and Bianca Castafiore (each controlled by a different player, or by the same player at different times) must combine their unique abilities to complete each level.

The two different graphical and gameplay styles; the top image shows the 2D platform based nature of the console versions of the game, the bottom image shows the 3D stealth elements of the iOS and Android versions.

In the iOS and Android versions, there are several gameplay differences. For example, the game does not include the 2D side-scrolling views. Instead, it uses a 3D third-person perspective throughout. The player can press and hold the "sprint" button to run, and the "stealth" button to crawl silently. The player cannot attack directly but can tap and swipe buttons on the screen to perform attack moves. In the Sir Francis levels, the player is able to fire cannons and sword fight. Sword fights are played using a side-view, and are controlled by means of finger swipes on the touchscreen. The game also incorporates stealth levels and quick time events.

== Plot ==
The console and 3DS versions of the game have a slightly different plot than the iOS, Android and Symbian^3 versions. All versions diverge from the film's plotline, such as the console/3DS restoring the Bird Brothers from the original The Secret of the Unicorn comic as antagonists (rather than Sakharine), as well as incorporating a castle section visually reminiscent of The Black Island (in lieu of the film's climax at the Brussels docks).

=== Console and 3DS versions ===
Tintin (voiced by Adam Howden) purchases a model ship of the Unicorn, a galleon which belonged to Sir Francis Haddock. He learns that the ship (which was part of Louis XIV's (Note: Charles II in the English version.) fleet) was on its way from the West Indies to Europe when it was attacked by the pirate Red Rackham. Rather than allow the Unicorn to be boarded, Sir Francis scuttled the ship and fled.

Tintin finds a scroll hidden inside the model, which contains a strange poem about three ships. Some men attack him and steal the ship, but not the scroll. Tintin uses his dog Snowy to follow the scent of one of the men, leading them to Marlinspike Hall, owned by the Bird brothers. The brothers chase Tintin, trying to get the scroll (which Tintin gave to Snowy), but Allan (Timothy Watson) and his men knock them unconscious. Allan knocks Tintin unconscious as well.

Tintin wakes up on a ship, the Karaboudjan, but is freed by Snowy. Realizing that Allan has stolen the Birds' scroll, they set out to find him. He inadvertently comes across the ship's original captain, Archibald Haddock (Lewis MacLeod), a descendant of Sir Francis. He gives Tintin directions on how to find Allan. Tintin manages to get the scrolls from Allan and brings them to Haddock, who agrees to tell Tintin the story of his ancestor. However, as Haddock re-enacts his ancestor's sword fighting, he wrecks the machine room, causing the ship to sink. Tintin, Snowy and Haddock manage to escape and climb onto a seaplane.

The three travel to Bagghar, the Karaboudjan's original destination, to continue their quest to stop Allan. There, they discover that Omar ben Salaad (Waleed Elgadi) has the third model Unicorn. After getting into his palace, they meet Bianca Castafiore, who is staging a concert there. Tintin learns that Salaad wants to get the third scroll and that he is, in fact, Allan's boss. Tintin gets the third scroll and heads off to Brittany, which he and Haddock earlier identified as Sir Francis' hideout.

As Haddock re-enacts Sir Francis's story, they learn the truth: the pirates had already killed his entire crew, he vanquished Rackham, and that the scuttle was necessary to finish off the remaining pirates onboard the Unicorn. Learning that the scrolls contain the coordinates of Red Rackham's treasure, Tintin and Haddock plan to head there, but Allan kidnaps Haddock and uses him as a hostage to get the scrolls.

After rescuing Haddock, who remembers the coordinates, he and Tintin discover that the treasure is hidden within Marlinspike Hall. There they confront the Bird brothers along with Salaad and Allan. They find the treasure and another scroll from the king, revealing that he rewarded Marlinspike Hall to Sir Francis in gratitude for vanquishing Rackham and the pirates, making Haddock its true owner, and the alerted Thomson and Thompson arrest the criminals.

=== Mobile versions ===
Tintin purchases a model ship from a stall when another man approaches him and offers to buy the ship from him. Tintin refuses to sell it, however. The stall owner tells Tintin the man's name is Sakharine (Alec Newman), and that he has come to the market a lot over the last few weeks to buy antiquities. Shortly afterward, the ship is stolen from Tintin, so he and Snowy decide to head to Sakharine's home, Marlinspike Hall, to investigate. Tintin finds what he initially thinks to be his stolen ship, but soon realizes that the one he has found is slightly different from his.

On the way home, he is kidnapped and taken aboard the Karaboudjan, a steam ship heading for Baghar, a city located in North Africa. Tintin escapes from his cell and meets Captain Haddock, the original captain of the ship, who has been imprisoned by Sakharine after he took over the ship and bribed Haddock's crew into working for him. Haddock helps Tintin and Snowy escape, but as they are at sea in a lifeboat, they are attacked by a seaplane sent by Sakharine. The attack fails, and Tintin is able to damage the plane. Tintin and Haddock hold the pilot captive and fly away, but crash-land in the desert after the plane is struck by lightning. As they travel through the desert, Haddock tells Tintin about his ancestor Sir Francis Haddock, who was the captain of the Unicorn, a galleon that was attacked by Red Rackham, who wanted Haddock's treasure. Rather than allow the ship to be boarded, Haddock decided to scuttle it and escape in a lifeboat.

Tintin and Haddock fall unconscious in the desert. Tintin wakes up to find himself in Fort Salaad, an outpost a few days away from Baghar. There he meets Lt. Hank Morris, who tells Tintin that Haddock, who had been angry and violent, is currently in the barracks unconscious. Tintin asks Hank's permission to use the telegraph, sending a message before joining some soldiers on a caravan to Baghar with Haddock and Snowy.

There, Sakharine has joined an opera owned by a rich man named Omar ben Salaad, who has the third miniature ship, which is hidden in his opera house. Having received Tintin's telegram, Thomson and Thompson prepare an arrest outside the opera house, while Tintin and Haddock sneak in. Tintin makes it to the walkways under the ceiling and finds that one of Haddock's old crewmen has gotten the miniature ship. Haddock reveals himself to Sakharine and challenges him to a fight. Chaos ensues on the stage and walkways. They fight across the stage, much to the surprise of Ben Salaad and the audience. Tintin defeats Sakharine's crew and jumps off the walkway down onto the stage to help Haddock. Snowy pursues Sakharine's pet crow and holds on to its feet, getting the miniature ship in the process. Sakharine attempts to kill Tintin, but Haddock hits him in the head, knocking him unconscious. Tintin, Haddock, and Snowy receive applause from the audience.

After hearing Tintin, Haddock, and Snowy's story, Salaad gives them the ship and the scroll, telling them that they can take it with them to find the treasure, and thus giving Tintin and Haddock an excuse for another adventure.

== Critical reception ==
Reception

Aggregate scores
Aggregator	Score
GameRankings	46% (Wii); 64.7% (Xbox 360); 64.6% (PS3); 55.7% (3DS); 87.6% (iOS)
Metacritic	59/100 (PS3); 63/100 (Xbox 360); 56/100 (3DS)

Review scores
Publication	Score
1Up.com	D
Edge	6/10
Eurogamer	7/10
GameSpot	5/10
GamesRadar+	3/5
IGN	6.5/10
148 Apps	4.5/5 (iOS)
AppSpy	4/5 (iOS)
Gamezebo	5/5 (iOS)
Slide to Play	4/4 (iOS)

The PC, Xbox 360, PlayStation 3, Nintendo 3DS and Wii versions of the game received mixed reviews. The iOS and Android version received positive reviews.

On GameRankings, the game holds a score of 45.00% for Wii, based on two reviews; 64.65% for Xbox 360, based on thirty reviews; 64.61% for PS3, based on eighteen reviews; 64.67% for 3DS, based on three reviews; and 87.60% for iOS, based on five reviews. On Metacritic, it holds scores of 59/100 for PS3, based on twenty-seven reviews; 63/100 for Xbox 360, based on thirty-five reviews; and 56/100 for 3DS, based on eight reviews.

Marty Sliva of 1UP.com was highly critical of the game, awarding it a D and describing it as "a frontrunner for Worst Game of 2011" and "a master class in failure". He wrote that "the game puts players through a handful of scenarios that repeat themselves over the course of the longest two and a half hours you'll ever spend" and "the levels unfold with a spectacular lack of sophistication". GameSpot's Mark Walton was also unimpressed, scoring the game 5 out of 10 and criticizing the platforming core gameplay as too easy, although he praised the co-op mode. He concluded that "you can sit back and coast through [the game] without even thinking, and the somewhat interesting story is little compensation. Repetitive levels and overly simple puzzles just add to the game's troubles. The Adventures of Tintin: The Secret of the Unicorn is another game to add to the pile of movie tie-in games that missed that mark, and it's a failed opportunity to do something great with a well-loved character".

GamesRadar's Leif Johnson was slightly more complimentary, scoring the game 3 out of 5. He criticized the game as too easy and referred to the non-platforming levels as "forced variety [...] these sequences thrive more on tedium than challenge, and at best they're a distraction from the superior platforming". However, he was impressed with the co-op mode. Edge scored the game 6 out of 10, praising the 2D platforming sequences and the graphics, but, like GamesRadar, they criticized the developers' attempts to mix up the gameplay by adding different types of levels. They also found the game too short and shallow; "unlike the contours of Hergé's timeless stories, there's no hidden treasure to be found beneath its dazzling veneer".

IGN's Alex Simmons scored the game 6.5 out of 10, writing that "Tintin only has itself to blame for its shortcomings: for every exciting moment there's a turgid interlude which drags the overall experience down. While these distractions are more tedious bore than hair-pulling aggravation there's no doubt their omission would've made for a tighter and ultimately better game. By shoe-horning variety into the game it loses its focus, which combined with silly game design decisions—the dogfights really should've been left on the drawing board—and a handful of game-breaking bugs—Tintin crashed on more than one occasion during review—it's hard to recommend this to anyone other than diehard fans of both the comics and the movie". Christian Donlan of Eurogamer was a little more impressed, scoring the game 7 out of 10 and calling it "clever and deeply charming". However, as with GamesRadar, Edge and IGN, he criticized the non-platforming levels; "all of these interludes provide a little variety, but they're unconvincing in execution and a bore to play through".

The iOS and Android version of the game received generally positive reviews from critics. AppSpy's Andrew Nesvadba scored the iOS version 4 out of 5, arguing that "not only does it bring the aesthetics of the film to life, it pursues fresh and interesting avenues for gameplay (who'd have honestly expected Cut the Rope style puzzles to crop up?) without compromising the integrity of the story it seeks to convey. A great pick up for fans of the series and those after a tight action-adventure title for the holidays". Dan Lee of 148Apps scored it 4.5 out of 5, calling it "an extremely enjoyable game that manages to combine multiple genres, yet never feels messy". Slide to Play's Parisa Vassei scored it 4 out of 4, calling it "a high-quality game. It boasts truly stunning graphics, stable gameplay, and a rich, immersive experience". Gamezebo's Mike Thompson scored it 5 out of 5, stating that "Gameloft's pulled out all the stops this time, and the result is a masterpiece of an adventure game, one that combines the point and click adventure elements with the best uses of an iOS device's attributes".
