= The Adventures of Tintin (film) =

2011 film by Steven Spielberg

- Theatrical release poster
- Directed by: Steven Spielberg
- Screenplay by: Steven Moffat; Edgar Wright; Joe Cornish
- Based on: The Adventures of Tintin by Hergé
- Produced by: Steven Spielberg; Peter Jackson; Kathleen Kennedy
- Starring: Jamie Bell; Andy Serkis; Daniel Craig
- Cinematography: Janusz Kamiński
- Edited by: Michael Kahn
- Music by: John Williams
- Production companies: Paramount Pictures; Columbia Pictures; DreamWorks Pictures; DreamWorks Animation; Nickelodeon Movies; Amblin Entertainment; The Kennedy/Marshall Company; WingNut Films
- Distributed by: Paramount Pictures (Note: Paramount Pictures released the film in North America, the United Kingdom, Ireland, Australia, New Zealand, South Africa and Asia (excluding India, Japan and South Korea); Toho-Towa and Lotte Entertainment distributed the film in Japan and South Korea respectively, with Sony Pictures Releasing International distributing in all remaining territories.)
- Release dates: 22 October 2011 (Brussels); 26 October 2011 (New Zealand); 21 December 2011 (United States)
- Running time: 107 minutes
- Countries: New Zealand; United States
- Language: English
- Budget: $135 million
- Box office: $374 million

The Adventures of Tintin (released as The Adventures of Tintin: The Secret of the Unicorn in some territories) is a 2011 animated adventure film directed by Steven Spielberg, who produced it with Peter Jackson and Kathleen Kennedy, and written by Steven Moffat, Edgar Wright and Joe Cornish. Based on the Tintin comic book series by Hergé, the film stars Jamie Bell, Andy Serkis and Daniel Craig. In the film, Tintin, Snowy and Captain Haddock search for the treasure of the Unicorn, a ship once captained by Haddock's ancestor Sir Francis Haddock, but face dangerous pursuit by Ivan Ivanovitch Sakharine, the descendant of Sir Francis' nemesis Red Rackham.

Spielberg and Hergé admired each other's work; Spielberg acquired the film rights to The Adventures of Tintin after Hergé's death in 1983, and re-optioned them in 2002. Filming was due to begin in October 2008 for a 2010 release, but the release was delayed to 2011 after Universal Pictures backed out of producing the film with Paramount Pictures, which had provided $30 million in pre-production; Columbia Pictures replaced Universal as co-financer. The delay resulted in Thomas Brodie-Sangster, who was originally cast as Tintin, departing and being replaced by Bell. The film draws inspiration from the Tintin volumes The Crab with the Golden Claws, The Secret of the Unicorn and Red Rackham's Treasure. Principal photography began in January 2009 and finished that July, with a combination of voice acting, motion capture and traditional computer animation being used.

The Adventures of Tintin premiered at the UGC De Brouckère in Brussels on 22 October 2011, and was released in New Zealand on 26 October and in the United States on 21 December by Paramount. The film received generally positive reviews from critics, who praised the motion-capture animation, faithful character designs, visual effects, action sequences, cast performances and musical score, and grossed $374 million against a $135 million budget, and received numerous awards and nominations, including being the first motion-captured animated film to win the Golden Globe Award for Best Animated Feature Film, while John Williams was nominated for an Academy Award for Best Original Score. A sequel is in development.

== Plot ==
In 1940s Brussels, young journalist Tintin browses an outdoor market with his pet dog Snowy and purchases a model of a ship known as the Unicorn. He is then accosted by an Interpol officer named Barnaby and a ship collector named Ivan Ivanovitch Sakharine, who both unsuccessfully attempt to purchase the model from Tintin. After Tintin takes the model home to his apartment, it gets accidentally broken during a chase between Snowy and a cat. A parchment scroll then slips out and rolls under a piece of furniture. Meanwhile, bumbling police detectives Thomson and Thompson are on the trail of a kleptomaniac pickpocket named Aristides Silk.

After visiting Maritime Library to uncover the history surrounding the Unicorn, Tintin returns to find the Unicorn had been stolen. Suspecting Sakharine, he heads to Marlinspike Hall and accuses him of the theft, but noticing Sakharine's model is not broken he realizes there are two Unicorn models. Tintin then returns home to his apartment to find it ransacked. Snowy shows him a scroll that had rolled under a chest of drawers when the ship was knocked to the floor. Soon after, they are interrupted by the arrival of Interpol Barnaby, who is then assassinated while attempting to recover the Unicorn. Tintin places the scroll in his wallet, but is pickpocketed by Silk the next morning.

Later, Tintin is abducted and imprisoned by accomplices of Sakharine on the SS Karaboudjan. He learns that Sakharine formed an alliance with the ship's staff and led a mutiny to take control. On board, Tintin meets Archibald Haddock, the ship's captain who is permanently drunk and unaware of most of his past. Tintin, Haddock and Snowy eventually outrun the crew, escape from the Karaboudjan in a lifeboat, and attempt to use a second one to fake their deaths, but Sakharine sees through the ruse and sends a seaplane to find and capture them. Feeling cold and thirsty on the lifeboat ride, Haddock foolishly uses a stowaway bottle of whisky to light a fire in the boat, accidentally causing a massive explosion that flips the boat upside down and leaves the trio stranded on top of it. The trio seizes the plane, and uses it to fly towards the fictitious Moroccan port of Bagghar. However, the seaplane crashes in a desert due to low fuel and a thunderstorm.

While trekking through the desert, Haddock hallucinates and remembers his ancestor, Sir Francis Haddock, the 17th-century captain of the Unicorn whose treasure-laden ship was attacked by the crew of a pirate ship, led by their leader Red Rackham, later revealed to be Sakharine's ancestor. Sir Francis surrenders and eventually destroys the Unicorn and most of the treasure, to prevent it from falling into Rackham's hands before sinking. The story implies there were three Unicorn models, each containing a scroll; together, the scrolls can reveal coordinates of the location of the sunken Unicorn and its treasure. The group is eventually found and rescued by French soldiers and they make their way to Bagghar.

Thomson and Thompson arrive in Bagghar and give Tintin back his wallet and the first scroll, having apprehended Silk. The third model and scroll is possessed by Omar ben Salaad, which Sakharine steals during a Bianca Castafiore concert. A chase through the city ensues during which Sakharine gains all the scrolls. Just as he is ready to give up, Tintin is persuaded by Haddock to continue. With help from Thomson and Thompson, Tintin and Haddock track Sakharine back to Brussels and set up a trap, but Sakharine resists. When his men fail to save him, Sakharine challenges Haddock to a sword fight with the cranes at the dock. Sakharine threatens to torch the scrolls after Haddock corners him, but Tintin snatches them from him. After the fight, Sakharine is pushed by Haddock overboard and is then arrested by Thomson and Thompson.

Tintin, Haddock and Snowy are guided by the three scrolls back to Marlinspike Hall, revealed to be the Haddock family estate. In the cellar, Haddock notes a globe with an island he knows does not exist and presses it, causing the globe to open and reveal some of the treasure that Sir Francis had managed to recover along with his hat and a clue to the Unicorn's location. The film ends with both men agreeing to set up an expedition to find the shipwreck and the rest of the treasure.

== Cast ==
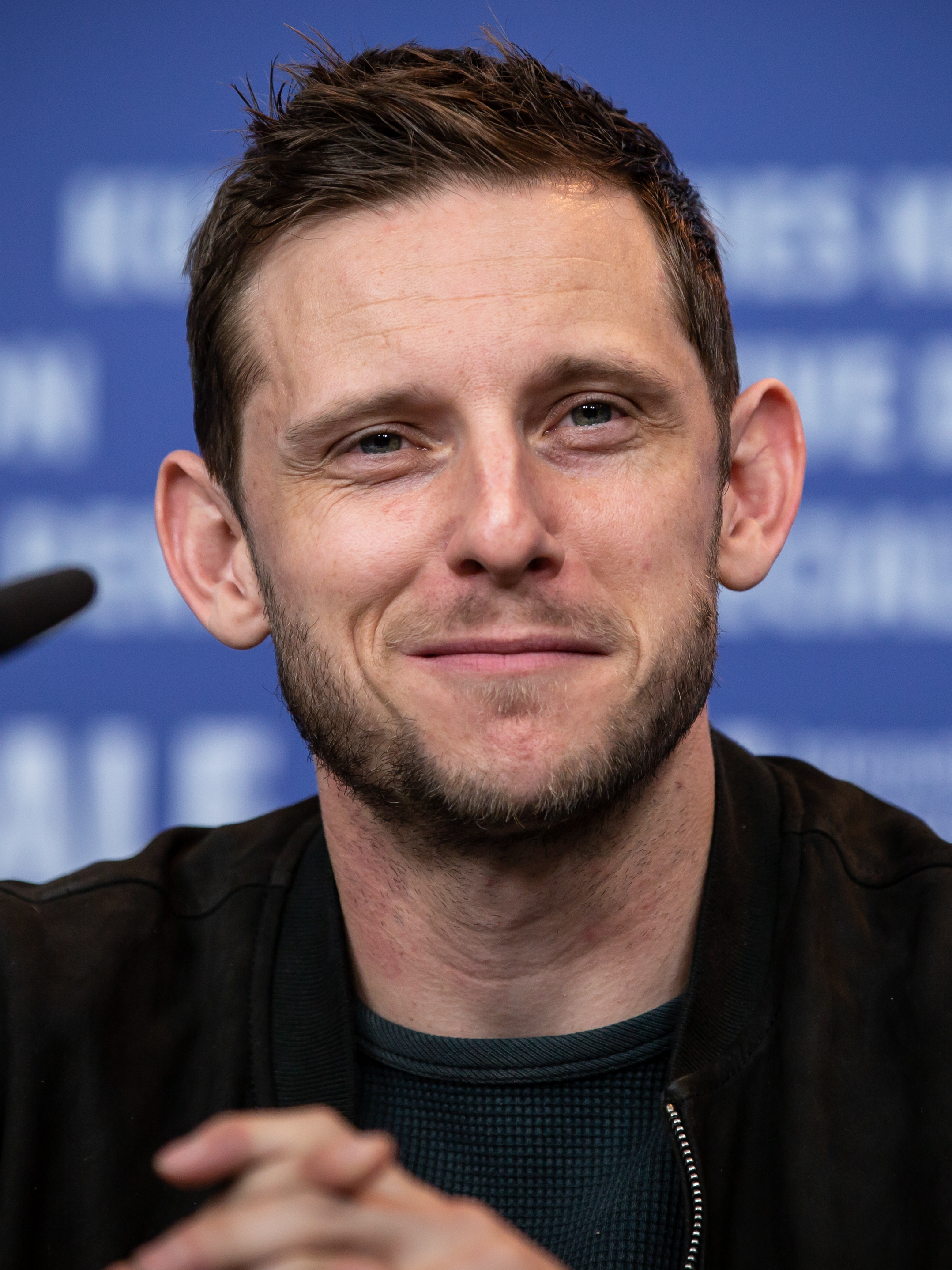
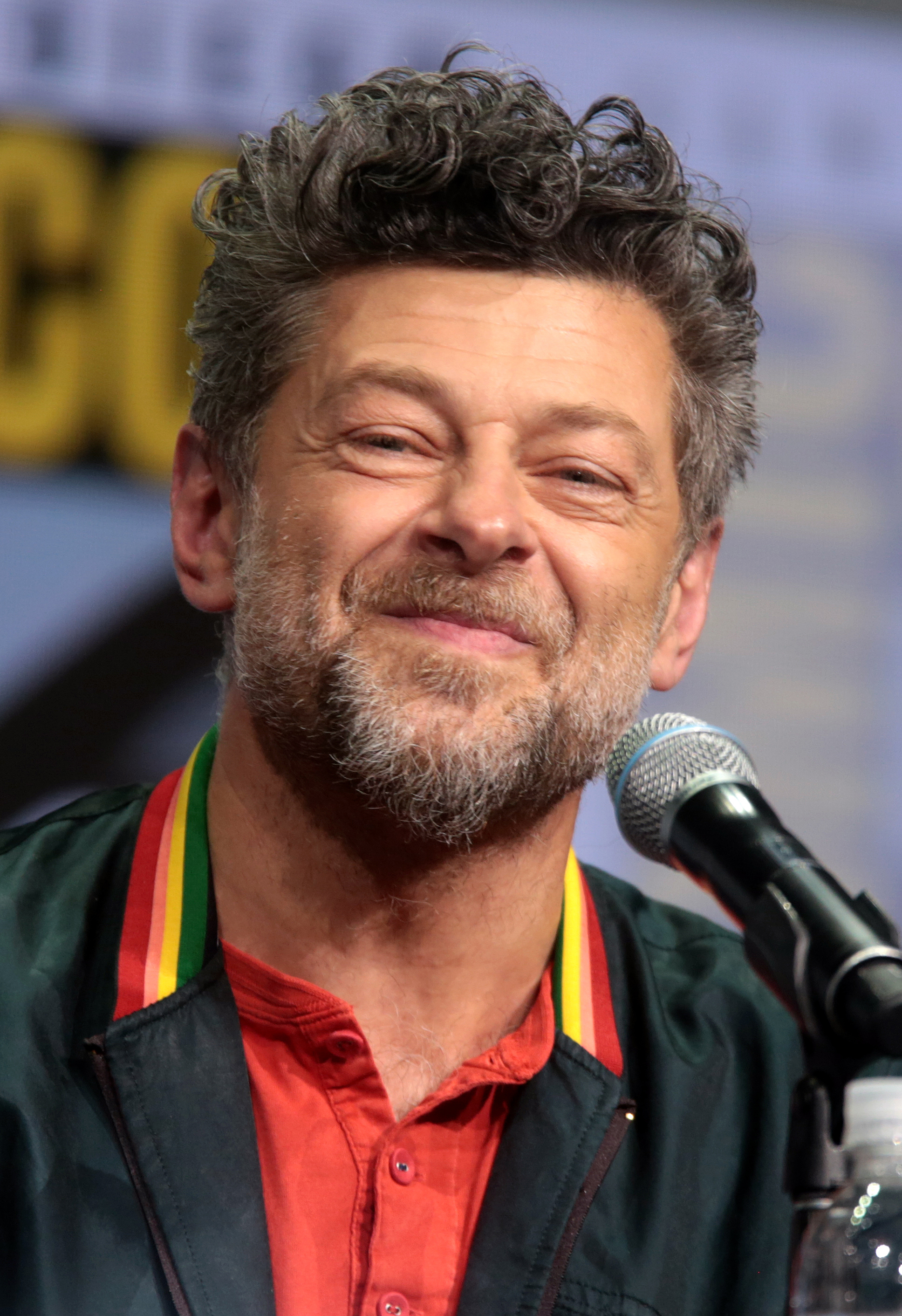
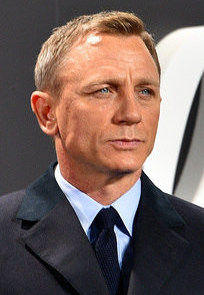
(Left to right) Jamie Bell (pictured in 2019), Andy Serkis (2017), and Daniel Craig (2015), the voices of Tintin, Captain Haddock, and Ivan Ivanovitch Sakharine, respectively
- Jamie Bell as Tintin. Bell replaced Thomas Brodie-Sangster, who dropped out when filming was delayed in October 2008. Jackson suggested Bell to take on the role after previously casting him as Jimmy in his King Kong remake.
- Andy Serkis as Captain Archibald Haddock and Sir Francis Haddock. Spielberg suggested Serkis, given he played Gollum in Jackson's The Lord of the Rings trilogy and King Kong in the 2005 remake, which were both roles requiring motion capture, and also because he considers Serkis a "great and funny actor". Serkis joked he was concerned Jackson wanted him to play Tintin's dog, Snowy, who was animated traditionally, i.e., without motion capture. Serkis remarked upon reading the comics again for the role that they had a surreal Pythonesque quality. The actor researched seamen, and gave Haddock a Scottish accent as he felt the character had "a rawness, an emotional availability, a more Celtic kind of feel".
- Daniel Craig as Ivan Ivanovitch Sakharine, the main antagonist and descendant of Red Rackham; and Red Rackham the pirate who attacked the Unicorn, the ship captained by Sir Francis Haddock. Spielberg described Sakharine as a "champagne villain, cruel when he has to be but with a certain elegance to him". Jackson and Spielberg decided to promote Sakharine from a relatively minor character to the villain, and while considering an "interesting actor" to portray him, Spielberg came up with Craig, with whom he had worked on Munich. Craig joked he followed "the English tradition of playing bad guys".
- Nick Frost and Simon Pegg as Thomson and Thompson, respectively, bumbling police detectives who are almost identical despite not being related. The duo was invited out of necessity to have a comedy team that could act identical. Spielberg invited Pegg to the set and offered him the role after he had completed How to Lose Friends & Alienate People.
- Toby Jones as Aristides Silk, a pickpocket and self-confessed kleptomaniac.
- Daniel Mays as Allan, Captain Haddock's former first mate.
- Mackenzie Crook as Tom, a thug on the Karaboudjan.
- Gad Elmaleh as Omar ben Salaad, an Arab potentate. Elmaleh stated his accent was "the childhood coming back".
- Enn Reitel as Nestor, Sakharine's butler; and Mr. Crabtree, a vendor who sells the Unicorn to Tintin.
- Tony Curran as Lieutenant Delcourt, an ally of Tintin.
- Joe Starr as Barnaby Dawes, an Interpol agent who tries to warn Tintin about purchasing the Unicorn and ends up being shot by Sakharine's thugs on Tintin's doorstep.
- Kim Stengel as Bianca Castafiore, a comical opera singer. While Castafiore was absent from the three stories, Jackson said she was added for her status as an "iconic character" and because she would be a fun element of the plot. Renée Fleming provides the singing voice for Castafiore.
- Sonje Fortag as Mrs. Finch, Tintin's landlady.
- Cary Elwes and Phillip Rhys as French seaplane pilots working for Sakharine. Elwes came across Spielberg in the cereal aisle of a grocery store shortly after Spielberg visited Robert Zemeckis on the A Christmas Carol set and persuaded Spielberg to cast him on the film due to being a huge Tintin fan. Spielberg appreciated Elwes' devotion to the franchise and cast him as one of the pilots because they were the last of the parts to be cast, which Elwes gratefully accepted regardless of its size because being part of the film meant so much for him.
- Nathan Meister as a Market artist who bears a resemblance to Hergé.
- Mark Ivanir as Afgar Outpost Soldier/Secretary.
- Sebastian Roché as Pedro/1st Mate.
- Ron Bottitta as a Unicorn Lookout.
- Sana Etoile as a Press Reporter.

== Production ==
=== Development ===
Steven Spielberg became an avid fan of The Adventures of Tintin in 1981 after a review compared Raiders of the Lost Ark to the comics. Meanwhile, Hergé—who disliked the previous live-action film versions and the Hergé's Adventures of Tintin animated series—became a fan of Spielberg. Michael Farr, author of Tintin: The Complete Companion, recalled Hergé "thought Spielberg was the only person who could ever do Tintin justice". Hergé had been looking to use the medium of film to make Tintin more current, as he felt that the animated films Tintin and the Temple of the Sun and Tintin and the Lake of Sharks had failed to capture the essence of the books. Spielberg and his production partner Kathleen Kennedy of Amblin Entertainment were scheduled to meet with Hergé in 1983 while filming Indiana Jones and the Temple of Doom in London. Hergé died that week, but his widow Fanny Remi decided to give them the rights. A three-year-long option to film the comics was finalized in 1984, with Universal Pictures as distributor.

Spielberg commissioned E.T. the Extra-Terrestrial writer Melissa Mathison to script a film about Tintin battling ivory hunters in Africa. Spielberg saw Tintin as an "Indiana Jones for kids" and wanted Jack Nicholson to play Haddock. Unsatisfied with the script, Spielberg continued production on Indiana Jones and the Last Crusade; the rights returned to the Hergé Foundation. Claude Berri and Roman Polanski became interested in filming the property, while Warner Bros. Pictures negotiated for the rights, but they could not guarantee the "creative integrity" that the Foundation found in Spielberg. In 2001, Spielberg revealed his interest in depicting Tintin with computer animation. In November 2002, his studio DreamWorks Pictures reestablished the option to film the series. Spielberg originally said he would only produce the film. In 2004, French magazine Capital reported Spielberg was intending a trilogy based on The Secret of the Unicorn / Red Rackham's Treasure, The Seven Crystal Balls / Prisoners of the Sun and The Blue Lotus / Tintin in Tibet. By then, Spielberg had reverted to his idea of a live-action adaptation and called Peter Jackson to ask if Weta Digital would create a computer-generated Snowy.

We're making them look photorealistic; the fibres of their clothing, the pores of their skin and each individual hair. They look exactly like real people—but real Hergé people!

— Peter Jackson explains the film's look.

Jackson, a longtime fan of the comics, had used motion capture in The Lord of the Rings and King Kong; he suggested that a live-action adaptation would not do justice to the comic books and that motion capture was instead the best way of representing Hergé's world of Tintin. A week of filming took place in November 2006 in Playa Vista, Los Angeles, on the stage where James Cameron shot Avatar. Andy Serkis had been cast, while Jackson stood in for Tintin. During the shoot, Cameron and Robert Zemeckis were present. The footage was transmitted to Weta Digital, who produced a 20-minute test reel that depicted photorealistic characters. Spielberg said he would not mind filming it digitally because he saw it as an animated film, and reiterated his live-action work would always be filmed traditionally. Lead designer Chris Guise visited Brussels to see the inspiration for Hergé's sceneries.

An official announcement about the collaboration was made in May 2007, although both filmmakers had to wait to film it: Spielberg was preparing Indiana Jones and the Kingdom of the Crystal Skull while Jackson was planning The Lovely Bones. Spielberg had considered two books to become the main story, The Crab with the Golden Claws and The Secret of the Unicorn, with the main plot eventually following the latter and its immediate sequel, Red Rackham's Treasure. Jackson felt the former's story "wasn't really robust enough to sustain a feature film", but the filmmakers still included elements from the comic, such as the Karaboudjan and the first meeting of Tintin and Haddock. Spielberg invited Edgar Wright to write the script for the film, but Wright was busy and instead recommended other names, including Steven Moffat. In October 2007, Moffat joined as the screenwriter for two of the Tintin films. Moffat said he was "love bombed" by Spielberg into accepting the offer to write the films, with the director promising to shield him from studio interference with his writing. Moffat finished one draft, but not another due to the 2007–08 Writers Guild of America strike. He then became executive producer of Doctor Who, and was allowed to leave by Spielberg and Jackson. Wright then returned and agreed to take over the script alongside Joe Cornish, a fan of Tintin with whom Wright was working at the time. After two drafts of the script, Wright left to begin filming Scott Pilgrim vs. the World., while Cornish stayed on to finish the script under the guidance of Spielberg and Jackson.

More filming took place in March 2008. However, that August (a month before principal photography would have begun), Universal turned down their option to co-produce due to the poor box office performances of recent motion-captured animated films such as Monster House and Beowulf, as well as Spielberg and Jackson's request for a combined 30% of the gross. Paramount Pictures (DreamWorks' distributor) had hoped to partner with Universal on the project, having spent $30 million on pre-production. Spielberg gave a ten-minute presentation of footage, hoping they would approve filming to begin in October. Paramount, along with their subsidiary Nickelodeon Movies, offered to produce as long as the directors found a studio that was willing to co-produce the film: Spielberg and Jackson agreed, and by the end of October negotiated with Sony's Columbia Pictures to co-finance and distribute the first film internationally. Sony only agreed to finance two films, though Jackson said a third may still happen.

=== Filming and visual effects ===
Principal photography began in Los Angeles on 26 January 2009; the release date was pushed from 2010 to 2011. Spielberg finished his film—after 32 days of shooting—in March 2009. Jackson was present for the first week of filming and supervised the rest of the shoot via a bespoke videoconferencing program. Simon Pegg said Jackson's voice would "be coming over the Tannoy like God". During filming, various directors, including Guillermo del Toro, Stephen Daldry and David Fincher visited. Spielberg wanted to treat the film like live-action, moving his camera around. He revealed: "Every movie I made, up until Tintin, I always kept one eye closed when I've been framing a shot", because he wanted to see the movie in 2-D, the way viewers would. "On Tintin, I have both of my eyes open". Jackson took the hands-on approach to directing Weta Digital during post-production, which Spielberg supervised through video conferencing. Spielberg said "there will be no cell phones, no TV sets, no modern cars. Just timeless Europe". His frequent collaborator and cinematographer Janusz Kamiński served as lighting consultant for Weta, and Jackson said the film would look "film noirish, very atmospheric". Spielberg finished six weeks of additional motion-capture filming in mid-July 2009. Post production was finished in September 2011. From the very beginning to the very end, the film took a total of seven years in production.

To improve the quality of the indoor lighting nuances, Weta Digital and NVIDIA developed a piece of ray tracing software called PantaRay, which requires 100 to 1,000 times more computation than traditional shadow-map based solutions. For the performance of "Snowy", various models served as a reference for actors on-set, manipulated by property master Brad Elliott. According to animators, Snowy was the hardest character to animate and develop, due to the type of coat he has as well as being white. Later, a dog's motion was captured digitally so the animators had inspiration for realistic movements. His vocal effects were taken from various breeds of dogs.

== Soundtrack ==
John Williams composed and conducted the musical score for The Adventures of Tintin. It was the first time Williams had composed and conducted the score of a film since 2008's Indiana Jones and the Kingdom of the Crystal Skull, as well as his first score for an animated film. Most of the score was written while the animation was still in the early stages, with Williams seeking to employ "the old Disney technique of doing music first and have the animators trying to follow what the music is doing". Eventually, several cues had to be revised during the editing of the film. The composer decided to employ various musical styles, with "1920s, 1930s European jazz" for the opening credits and "pirate music" for the battle at sea. The score was released on 21 October 2011 by Sony Classical Records.

== Release ==
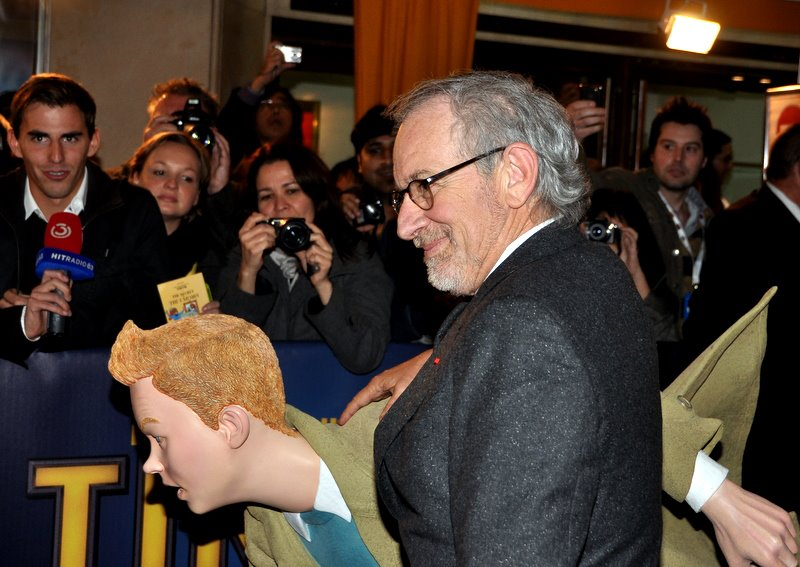
Steven Spielberg and a costumed character of Tintin at the film's premiere in Paris, 22 October 2011

The film's first press-screening was held in Belgium on 10 October 2011. The world première was held in Brussels on 22 October 2011—attended by Princess Astrid and her younger daughters, Princess Luisa Maria and Princess Laetitia Maria, with the Paris première later the same day. Sony later released the film during late October and early November 2011 in Europe, Latin America and India. The film was released in Quebec on 9 December. Paramount distributed the film in Asia, New Zealand, United Kingdom, and all other English-speaking territories. They released the film in the United States on 21 December.

A video game entitled The Adventures of Tintin: The Secret of the Unicorn, developed by game developer Ubisoft, was released to coincide with the release date of the film. Gameloft released a game for mobile devices to coincide with the film's European launch.

On 13 March 2012, Paramount Home Entertainment released The Adventures of Tintin on DVD and Blu-ray. Both formats of the film were also released as combo packs, with each pack including 11 behind-the-scenes featurettes. During its first week, The Adventures of Tintin Blu-ray was the number-one-selling HD movie after selling 504,000 units and generating $11.09 million in sales. The film was also the second-highest-selling home media seller during its first week, with 50% of its profits coming from its Blu-ray market.

== Reception ==
=== Critical response ===
On the review aggregator website Rotten Tomatoes, 75% of 233 critics' reviews are positive, with an average rating of 7.00/10. The website's consensus reads: "Drawing deep from the classic Raiders of the Lost Ark playbook, Steven Spielberg has crafted another spirited, thrilling adventure in the form of Tintin." Metacritic, which uses a weighted average, assigned the film a score of 68 out of 100, based on 40 critics, indicating "generally favorable" reviews. Audiences polled by CinemaScore gave the film an average grade of "A−" on an A+ to F scale.

Colin Covert of the Star Tribune gave the film four stars out of four and said that Spielberg's first venture into animation was his most delightful dose of pure entertainment since Raiders of the Lost Ark. Amy Biancolli of the San Francisco Chronicle wrote: "Such are the timeless joys of the books (and now the movie), this sparkling absurdity and knack for buckling swash under the worst of circumstances. The boy may have the world's strangest cowlick, but he sure can roll with the punches". Roger Ebert of Chicago Sun-Times gave the film three and a half stars out of four, calling it "an ambitious and lively caper, miles smarter than your average 3-D family film". He praised the setting of the film, stating its similarity to the original Tintin comic strips and was also pleased with the 3-D technology used in the film, saying that "Spielberg employed it as an enhancement to 2-D instead of an attention-grabbing gimmick". Peter Travers of Rolling Stone also gave the film three and a half stars out of four and wrote: "The movie comes at you in a whoosh, like a volcano of creative ideas in full eruption. Presented as the first part of a trilogy produced by Spielberg and Peter Jackson, The Adventures of Tintin hits home for the kid in all of us who wants to bust out and run free". Kenneth Turan of Los Angeles Times said: "Think of The Adventures of Tintin as a song of innocence and experience, able to combine a sweet sense of childlike wonder and pureness of heart with the most worldly and sophisticated of modern technology. More than anything, it's just a whole lot of fun".

Richard Corliss of Time wrote: "Motion capture, which transforms actors into cartoon characters in a vividly animated landscape, is the technique Spielberg has been waiting for—the Christmas gift … that he's dreamed of since his movie childhood". Jordan Mintzer of The Hollywood Reporter was also very positive about the film, describing it as "a good ol' fashioned adventure flick that hearkens back to the filmmaker's action-packed, tongue-in-cheek swashbucklers of the 1980s. Steven Spielberg's The Adventures of Tintin: The Secret of the Unicorn is a visually dazzling adaptation". Comparing it with another film, Mintzer said Tintin has "an altogether more successful mocap experience than earlier efforts like The Polar Express".

Belgian newspaper Le Soir's film critics Daniel Couvreur and Nicolas Crousse called the film "a great popular adventure movie", stating "[the film's] enthusiasm and childhood spirit are unreservedly infectious". Le Figaro praised the film, considering it to be "crammed with action, humor and suspense". Leslie Felperin of Variety wrote: "Clearly rejuvenated by his collaboration with producer Peter Jackson, and blessed with a smart script and the best craftsmanship money can buy, Spielberg has fashioned a whiz-bang thrill ride that's largely faithful to the wholesome spirit of his source but still appealing to younger, Tintin-challenged auds".

La Libre Belgique was, however, a little less enthusiastic; its film critic Alain Lorfèvre called the film "a technical success, [with] a Tintin vivid as it should be [and] a somewhat excessive Haddock". The Guardian's Xan Brooks gave the film two stars out of five, stating: "While the big set pieces are often exuberantly handled, the human details are sorely wanting. How curious that Hergé achieved more expression with his use of ink-spot eyes and humble line drawings than a bank of computers and an army of animators were able to achieve". Blog Critics writer Ross Miller said: "Author Hergé's wonderfully bold and diverse array of characters are a mixed bag when it comes to how they've been translated to the big-screen" and that while the mystery might be "perfectly serviceable for film ... the execution of it at times feels languid and stodgy, like it's stumbling along from one eye-catching setpiece to the next". However, he summed it up as "an enjoyable watch with some spectacular set-pieces, lavish visuals and some fine motion-capture performances".

Tom McCarthy, the author of a study of the Tintin books, described Hollywood's treatment in this film of its characters and stories as "truly execrable", stating that it ignores the books' key idea of inauthenticity. The themes of fakeness and phoniness and counterfeit that drive many of the original plots are replaced in the film with messages that feel "as though we have wandered into a seminar on monetisation through self-empowerment … It's like making a biopic of Nietzsche that depicts him as a born-again Christian, or of Gandhi as a trigger-happy Rambo blasting his way through the Raj".

Steve Rose from The Guardian wrote about one of the film's major criticisms: that The Adventures of Tintin, much like The Polar Express, crossed into the uncanny valley, thereby rendering Tintin "too human and not human at all". Manohla Dargis, one of the chief critics of The New York Times, called the movie "a marvel of gee-wizardry and a night's entertainment that can feel like a lifetime". The simplicity of the comic strip, she wrote, is a crucial part of the success of Tintin, who is "an avatar for armchair adventurers". Dargis noted that Tintin's appearance in the film "resembled Hergé's creation, yet was eerily different as if, like Pinocchio, his transformation into human form had been prematurely interrupted". Another major fault in the film, Dargis opines, is how it is overworked; she writes that there is "hardly a moment of downtime, a chance to catch your breath or contemplate the tension between the animated Expressionism and the photo-realist flourishes". Nevertheless, she singles out some of the "interludes of cinematic delight", approving of the visual imagination employed within the movie's numerous exciting scenes.

The film was named in New York magazine's David Edelstein's Top 10 List for 2011. It was also included in HitFix's top 10 films of 2011.

=== Box office ===
The Adventures of Tintin grossed $77,591,831 in North America and $296,402,120 in other territories for a worldwide total of $373,993,951.

In the United States, it is one of only 12 feature films to be released in over 3,000 theaters and still improve on its box office performance in its second weekend, increasing 17.6% from $9,720,993 to $11,436,160. On its first day, the film opened in the UK, France and Belgium, earning $8.6 million. In Belgium, Tintin's country of origin, the film made $520,000, while France provided $4.6 million, a number higher than other similar Wednesday debuts. In France, it was the second-best debut of the year for its first day after Harry Potter and the Deathly Hallows – Part 2. On its first weekend it topped the overseas box office with $56.2 million from 21 countries. In Belgium, it earned $1.99 million. It also earned the top spot in many major markets like France and the Maghreb region ($21 million), where it set a record opening weekend for an animated title; the UK, Ireland and Malta ($10.9 million), Germany ($4.71 million) and Spain ($3.75 million). It retained first place for a second consecutive and final weekend, earning $39.0 million from 45 territories. In its native Belgium it was up 20% to $2.39 million, while in France it plummeted 61% to $8.42 million. Its biggest debut was in Russia and the CIS ($4.81 million).

The film grossed ₹7.5 crore (US$800,000) on its opening weekend (11–13 November 2011) in India, an all-time record for a Spielberg film and for an animated feature in India. The film was released with 351 prints, the largest-ever release for an animated film. In four weeks, it became the highest-grossing animated film of all time in the country with ₹25.4 crore (US$2.7 million).

== Accolades ==
The Adventures of Tintin was nominated for Best Original Score at the 84th Academy Awards. It was the first all-digital motion-captured animated film (as well as the first non-Pixar film) to win a Golden Globe for Best Animated Feature Film. It also received two nominations at the 65th British Academy Film Awards in the categories of Best Animated Film and Best Special Visual Effects.

List of awards and nominations
Award	Category	Recipients and nominees	Result
Academy Awards	Best Original Score	John Williams	Nominated
Alliance of Women Film Journalists	Best Animated Film		Nominated
Annie Award	Best Animated Feature		Nominated
Annie Award	Best Animated Effects in an Animated Production	Kevin Romond	Won
Annie Award	Best Music in a Feature	John Williams	Won
Annie Award	Best Writing in a Feature Production	Steven Moffat, Edgar Wright and Joe Cornish	Nominated
Art Directors Guild	Fantasy Film		Nominated
BAFTA Awards	Best Animated Film	Steven Spielberg	Nominated
BAFTA Awards	Best Special Effects	Joe Letteri, Keith Miller, Wayne Stables and Jamie Beard	Nominated
BMI Film & TV Awards	Film Music Award	John Williams	Won
Chicago Film Critics Association	Best Animated Film		Nominated
Critics' Choice Movie Awards	Best Animated Feature		Nominated
Dallas-Fort Worth Film Critics	Best Animated Film		Nominated
Empire Awards	The Art of 3D		Won
Florida Film Critics Circle	Best Animated Film		Won
Golden Globe Awards	Best Animated Feature Film	Steven Spielberg	Won
Golden Trailer Awards	Best Animation/Family		Nominated
Golden Trailer Awards	Best Pre-show Theatrical Advertising		Nominated
Grammy Awards	Best Score Soundtrack For Visual Media	John Williams	Nominated
Houston Film Critics Society	Best Animated Film		Nominated
Houston Film Critics Society	Best Original Score	John Williams	Nominated
IGN Best of 2011	Best Animated Movie		Nominated
IGN Best of 2011	Best Movie Actor	Andy Serkis	Nominated
Los Angeles Film Critics Association	Best Animation		Nominated
New York Film Critics Online	Best Animated Film		Won
Online Film Critics Society	Best Animated Feature		Nominated
Producers Guild of America Award	Outstanding Producer of Animated Theatrical Motion Picture	Peter Jackson, Kathleen Kennedy and Steven Spielberg	Won
Satellite Awards	Best Motion Picture, Animated or Mixed Media		Won
Satellite Awards	Best Adapted Screenplay	Steven Moffat, Edgar Wright and Joe Cornish	Nominated
Saturn Awards	Best Animated Film		Nominated
Saturn Awards	Best Director	Steven Spielberg	Nominated
Saturn Awards	Best Music	John Williams	Nominated
Saturn Awards	Best Production Design	Kim Sinclair	Nominated
Saturn Awards	Best Editing	Michael Kahn	Nominated
Saturn Awards	Best Special Effects	Scott E. Anderson, Matt Aitken, Joe Letteri, Matthias Menz and Keith Miller	Nominated
St. Louis Gateway Film Critics Association Awards	Best Animated Film		Won
Toronto Film Critics Association	Best Animated Film		Won
Visual Effects Society	Outstanding Visual Effects in an Animated Feature Motion Picture	Jamie Beard, Joe Letteri, Meredith Meyer-Nichols, Eileen Moran	Nominated
Visual Effects Society	Outstanding Animated Character in an Animated Feature Motion Picture	Tintin—Gino Acevedo, Gustav Ahren, Jamie Beard, Simon Clutterbuck	Nominated
Visual Effects Society	Outstanding Created Environment in an Animated Feature Motion Picture	Bagghar—Hamish Beachman, Adam King, Wayne Stables, Mark Tait	Nominated
Visual Effects Society	Outstanding Created Environment in an Animated Feature Motion Picture	Docks—Matt Aitken, Jeff Capogreco, Jason Lazaroff, Alessandro Mozzato	Nominated
Visual Effects Society	Outstanding Created Environment in an Animated Feature Motion Picture	Pirate Battle—Phil Barrenger, Keith F. Miller, Alessandro Saponi, Christoph Sprenger	Nominated
Visual Effects Society	Outstanding Virtual Cinematography in an Animated Feature Motion Picture	Matt Aitken, Matthias Menz, Keith F. Miller, Wayne Stables	Nominated
Washington D.C. Area Film Critics Association	Best Animated Feature		Nominated
Women Film Critics Circle	Best Family Film		Nominated
World Soundtrack Academy	Best Original Soundtrack of the Year	John Williams	Nominated
World Soundtrack Academy	Soundtrack Composer of the Year	John Williams	Nominated

== Proposed sequels ==
Originally, the second Tintin film was to be based on Hergé's The Seven Crystal Balls and Prisoners of the Sun. However, screenwriter Anthony Horowitz later stated that those books would be the second sequel and another story would become the first sequel. Jackson announced that he would direct the sequel once he had finished The Hobbit trilogy. Two years before The Secret of the Unicorn, Jackson mentioned that his favorite Tintin stories were The Seven Crystal Balls, Prisoners of the Sun, The Black Island, and The Calculus Affair, but he had not yet decided which stories would form the basis of the second film. He added "it would be great" to use Destination Moon and Explorers on the Moon for a third or fourth film in the series.

By the time The Secret of the Unicorn was released, Spielberg said the book that would form the sequel had been chosen and that the Thomson and Thompson detectives would "have a much bigger role". The sequel would be produced by Spielberg and directed by Jackson. Kennedy said the script might be completed by February or March 2012 and motion-captured in summer 2012, so that the film would be on track to be released by Christmas 2014 or mid-2015.

In the months following the release of The Secret of the Unicorn, Spielberg revealed that a story outline for the sequel had been completed and that it was based on two books. Horowitz tweeted that Professor Calculus would be introduced in the sequel. During a press tour in Belgium for The Hobbit: An Unexpected Journey, Jackson said he intended to shoot performance-capture in 2013, aiming for a release date in 2015.

In March 2013, Spielberg said: "Don't hold me to it, but we're hoping the film will come out around Christmas-time in 2015. We know which books we're making, we can't share that now but we're combining two books which were always intended to be combined by Hergé". He refused to confirm the names of the books, but said The Blue Lotus would probably be the third Tintin film. In December 2014, when Jackson was asked if the Tintin sequel would be his next project after The Hobbit trilogy, he said that it would be made "at some point soon", but he added that he wanted to direct two New Zealand films before that.

In June 2015, Bell stated that the sequel was titled Tintin and the Temple of the Sun and that he hoped shooting would begin in early 2016 for a possible release by the end of 2017 or early 2018. Later in November, Horowitz said that he was no longer working on the sequel, and did not know if it was still being made, and in March 2016, he confirmed that the script he had written for the sequel had been scrapped.

In March 2018, Spielberg stated that "Peter Jackson has to do the second part. Normally, if all goes well, he will soon start working on the script. As it takes two years of animation work on the film, for you, I would not expect to see it for about three years. But Peter will stick to it. Tintin is not dead!" In interviews later the same year, Jackson affirmed his intent to make another Tintin film, but said that a script was yet to be written.

In an April 2022 interview with Forbes, Bell expressed interest in reprising his role saying. "He [Peter Jackson]'s always doing something, so if they said let's get the band back together, we'd go do it. It's going to be weird if I play Tintin at 45, but still, the technology allows it, so that's fine." In June 2024, Serkis stated that Jackson was working on the sequel.

In a May 2026 interview with Deadline at the Cannes Film Festival, Jackson confirmed that the film was still in development, that he would direct it and that he and Fran Walsh were working on the script. By July, Jackson stated that the film would be his next directorial endeavor and that he was still working on the script. In October, Jackson stated that the script was completed.
