= Edward Hungerford (spendthrift) =

English politician (1632–1711)

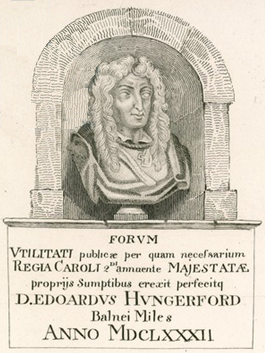
Drawing c.1832 of bust of Sir Edward Hungerford formerly in Hungerford Market. (Note: The Latin inscription reads: Forum utilitate publicae per quem necessarium Regia Caroli (Secun)di annuente Majestatae propriis sumptibus erexit perfecitq(ue) D(ominus) Edoardus Hungerford Balnei Miles anno MDCLXXXII ("This market for the use of the public, with the royal consent of His Majesty Charles the Second, Lord Edward Hungerford, Knight of the Bath, erected and completed at his own expense in the year 1682"). He wears on his breast the ancient badge of the order of the Bath.)

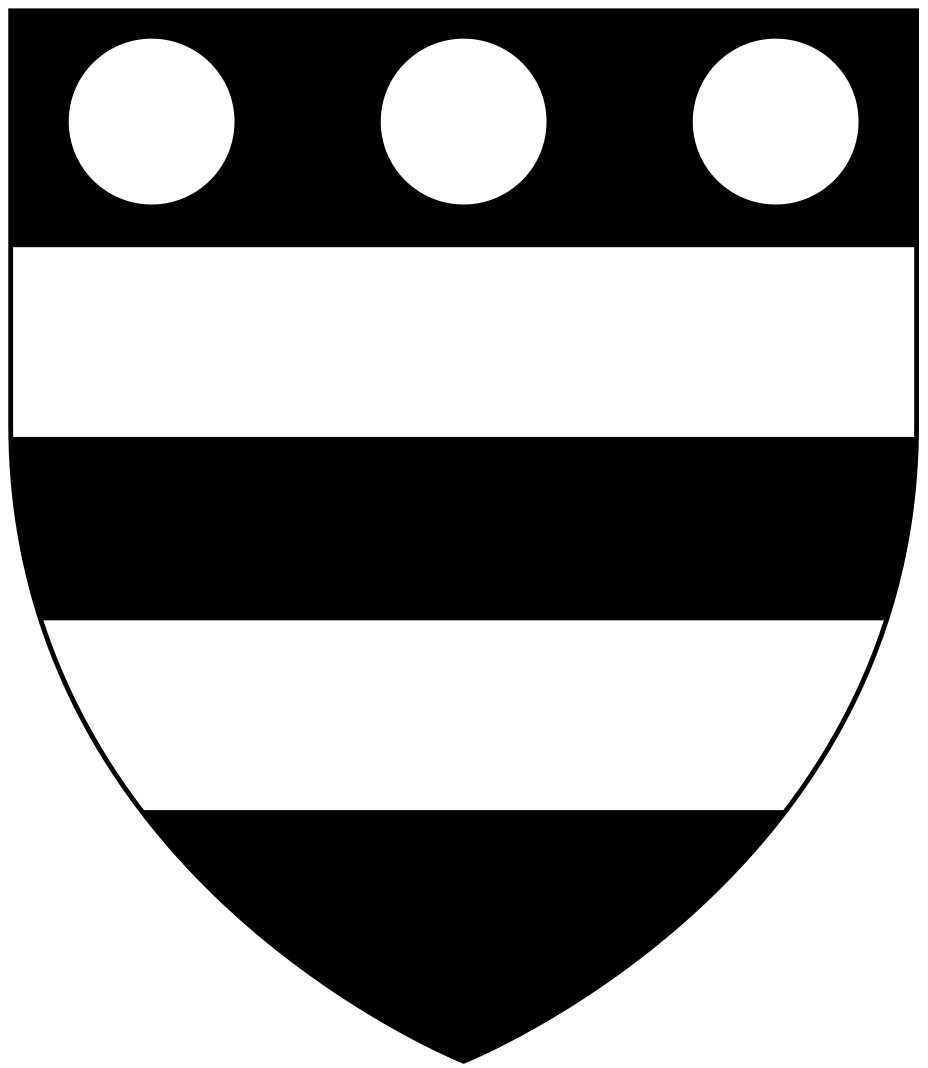
Arms of Hungerford: Sable, two bars argent in chief three plates

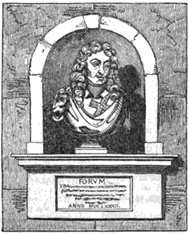
Another drawing of the bust of Hungerford, published in Gentleman's Magazine 1832

Sir Edward Hungerford, KB (20 October 1632 – 1711), was an English politician who sat in the House of Commons between 1659 and 1702. He was famous for his profligate ways and sold thirty manors, including the family seat at Farleigh Hungerford, to fund his extravagant lifestyle. He founded Hungerford Market at Charing Cross as a commercial venture.

== Origins ==
Hungerford was the son and heir of Anthony Hungerford (1607/8-1657) by his wife Rachel Jones, daughter of Rice Jones of Asthall, Oxfordshire and was baptised at Black Bourton, Oxfordshire. His father was a supporter of the royalist cause in the Civil War. Hungerford was a student of Queen's College, Oxford, in 1649. He succeeded to the family estates on the death of his father in 1657.

== Career ==
In 1658 Hungerford was elected Member of Parliament for Chippenham in the Third Protectorate Parliament. He was elected MP for Chippenham in 1660 for the Convention Parliament. He was made a Knight of the Bath at the coronation of King Charles II on 23 April 1661.

In 1661, he was elected for Chippenham again in the Cavalier Parliament but the election was declared void. He was then re-elected in the by-election later in 1661 and also in the two elections in 1679. In January 1680 he presented a petition for the summoning of a parliament, and his avowed opposition to the court party of King Charles II led to his removal as Lord Lieutenant of his county in May 1681.

He settled in Spring Gardens, Whitehall, in 1681 and was elected MP for Chippenham again in the Oxford Parliament of 1681. He was implicated in the 1683 Rye House Plot and his home at Farleigh Castle was searched for arms. He was elected MP for New Shoreham in 1685, 1688, and 1690, and for Steyning in 1695, 1698, 1700, and 1702.

Hungerford obtained some reputation as a patron of archery, and was lieutenant-colonel of the Regiment of Archers in 1661, and colonel in 1682. However, he was best known for his reckless extravagance. He is said to have disposed of thirty manors in all. By way of restoring his waning fortunes, he obtained permission in 1679 to hold a market, on Mondays, Wednesdays, and Saturdays on the site of the demolished Hungerford House and grounds. The house, which stood on the site of the present Charing Cross railway station, had been his family's London town house and had been destroyed by fire in April 1669.). In 1682 a market-house was erected there, apparently to the design of Sir Christopher Wren. A bust of Sir Edward was placed on the north front, with an inscription stating that the market had been built at his expense with the king's sanction. In 1685 Sir Stephen Fox and Sir Christopher Wren purchased the market and received the tolls. The market-house was rebuilt in 1833, and was removed in 1860, when Charing Cross railway station was built on the site, Hungerford sold the manor and his seat at Farleigh Castle in 1686 to Henry Baynton of Spye Park for £56,000, so ending centuries of ownership by the Hungerford family. In about 1700 it was purchased by Joseph Houlton of Trowbridge, in the possession of whose descendants it remained until July 1891, when it was bought by Lord Donington.

== Marriage and children ==
Hungerford married three times. His first marriage was before 1658 to Jane Hele, a daughter of Sir John Hele of Clifton Maybank, Dorset. She died on 18 March 1664 and was buried at Farleigh. By her, he had one son, Edward (died September 1689), who married in 1680, at the age of 19, to Lady Alathea Compton. Hungerford also had two daughters by Jane: Frances, and Rachel (died 2 February 1732). In March 1684 Rachel married Clotworthy Skeffington, third Viscount Massereene, and on her death she left to her eldest son portraits of her father, of her granduncle (another Sir Edward Hungerford), and of other relations.

His second marriage was on 3 February 1666 to Jane Culme (1637–1674); and his third marriage, to Jane Gerard, née Digby (died 1703) was in July 1679. Both these marriages were childless.

== Death ==
In his old age, Hungerford is stated to have become a Poor Knight of Windsor. He died in 1711 and was buried in the church of St. Martin's-in-the-Fields. With his death, the notable history of the family of Hungerford of Farleigh practically closes.

== Notes ==
Parliament of England
Preceded by Not represented in Second Protectorate Parliament	Member of Parliament for Chippenham; 1659; With: James Stedman	Succeeded by Not represented in Restored Rump
Preceded by Not represented in Restored Rump	Member of Parliament for Chippenham; 1660–1661; With: Edward Poole 1660–1661; Henry Bayntun 1661	Succeeded by Henry Bayntun; Sir Hugh Speke
Preceded by Henry Bayntun; Sir Hugh Speke	Member of Parliament for Chippenham; 1661–1685; With: Henry Bayntun 1661–1673; Francis Gwyn 1673–1679; John Talbot 1679; Samuel Ashe 1679–1681; Sir George Speke 1681–1685	Succeeded by Henry Bayntun; Sharington Talbot
Preceded by John Hales; Robert Fagg	Member of Parliament for New Shoreham; 1685–1695; With: Sir Richard Haddock 1685–1689; John Monke 1689–1690; John Perry 1690–1695	Succeeded by John Perry; Henry Priestman
Preceded by Sir John Fagg; Robert Fagg	Member of Parliament for Steyning; 1695–1701; With: Sir John Fagg 1695–1701; Sir Robert Fagg 1701; Charles Goring 1701	Succeeded by Charles Goring; Robert Fagg
Preceded by Charles Goring; Robert Fagg	Member of Parliament for Steyning; 1702–1705; With: Charles Goring	Succeeded by Charles Goring; William Wallis
