= John Monke =

English politician (c. 1659–1701)

John Monke (c. 1659 – 13 November 1701) was an English politician who sat in the House of Commons from 1689 to 1690.

Monke was elected Member of Parliament (MP) for New Shoreham in 1689 and held the seat to 1690. He was described as an obscure local gentleman who was probably a moderate Tory.

Monke died in November 1701.

Parliament of England
Preceded by Sir Edward Hungerford; Sir Richard Haddock	Member of Parliament for New Shoreham; 1689–1690; With: Sir Edward Hungerford	Succeeded by Sir Edward Hungerford; John Perry
