= The Shooting Star =

Comic album by Belgian cartoonist Hergé

The Shooting Star (L'Étoile mystérieuse)
- Cover of the English edition
- Date: 1942 (colour)
- Series: The Adventures of Tintin
- Publisher: Casterman

Creative team
- Creator: Hergé

Original publication
- Published in: Le Soir
- Date of publication: 20 October 1941 – 21 May 1942
- Language: French

Translation
- Publisher: Methuen
- Date: 1961
- Translator: Leslie Lonsdale-Cooper; Michael Turner

Chronology
- Preceded by: The Crab with the Golden Claws (1941)
- Followed by: The Secret of the Unicorn (1943)

The Shooting Star (French: L'Étoile mystérieuse) is the tenth volume of The Adventures of Tintin, the comics series by Belgian cartoonist Hergé. The story was serialised daily in Le Soir, Belgium's leading francophone newspaper, from October 1941 to May 1942 amidst the German occupation of Belgium during World War II. The story tells of young Belgian reporter Tintin, who travels with his dog Snowy and friend Captain Haddock aboard a scientific expedition to the Arctic Ocean on an international race to find a meteorite that has fallen to the Earth.

The Shooting Star was a commercial success and was published in book form by Casterman shortly after its conclusion; the first Tintin volume to be originally published in the 62-page full-colour format. Hergé continued The Adventures of Tintin with The Secret of the Unicorn, while the series itself became a defining part of the Franco-Belgian comics tradition. The Shooting Star has received a mixed critical reception and has been one of the more controversial installments in the series due to the perceived antisemitic portrayal of its villain. The story was adapted for both the 1957 Belvision animated series, Hergé's Adventures of Tintin, and for the 1991 animated series The Adventures of Tintin by Ellipse and Nelvana.

== Synopsis ==
A giant meteoroid approaches the Earth, spotted from an observatory by Professor Decimus Phostle; he and a self-proclaimed prophet, Philippulus, predict that the meteoroid will hit Earth and cause the end of the world. The meteoroid misses Earth, but a fragment of it plunges into the Arctic Ocean. Phostle determines that the object is made of a new material which he names Phostlite, and arranges an expedition to find it with a crew of European scientists. Accompanied by Tintin and Snowy, their polar expedition ship, the Aurora, is helmed by Tintin's friend Captain Haddock. Meanwhile, another expedition is funded by the financier Mr. Bohlwinkel, with a team setting out aboard the polar expedition ship Peary; thus, Phostle's expedition becomes part of a race to land on the meteorite.

On the day of the Aurora's departure, Bohlwinkel has a henchman plant a stick of dynamite on the ship, but the dynamite is found and eventually thrown overboard. In one of the shipping lanes of the North Sea, the Aurora is almost rammed by another of Bohlwinkel's ships, but Haddock steers out of the way. Further setbacks occur when Aurora has to refuel at Iceland, going to the port of Akureyri, where Haddock is informed that the Golden Oil Company (which is owned by Bohlwinkel's bank and has a fuel monopoly) has no fuel available. He and Tintin then come across an old friend of his, Captain Chester, and Tintin comes up with a plan to trick Golden Oil into providing the fuel they need by secretly running a hose to Aurora from Chester's ship, Sirius. As they are getting closer to the Peary the Aurora receives an indistinct distress call from another ship and the crew agrees to alter their course to help; however, Tintin exposes that the distress signal is a decoy to delay them, and they resume the journey. The Aurora intercepts a cable announcing that the Peary expedition has reached the meteorite but not yet claimed it. While the Peary crew rows to the meteorite, Tintin uses the Aurora's seaplane to get to and parachute onto the meteorite and plant the expedition's flag, thus winning the race.

Tintin and Snowy (who followed on the plane) make camp on the meteorite while the Aurora's engines are repaired after developing trouble. The next day, he finds immense explosive mushrooms, and discovers that Phostlite accelerates growth: his apple core grows into a large tree while a maggot turns into a huge butterfly, and he and Snowy are menaced by a giant spider that escaped from his lunch box, before the seaplane arrives again. A sudden seaquake shakes the meteorite to its core and it starts sinking into the sea. Tintin gets himself, Snowy and a piece of Phostlite to the pilot of the seaplane in the plane's life raft, as the meteorite itself finally disappears into the sea. Thereafter, Bohlwinkel learns by radio that he is expected to be tried for his crimes every law enforcement had him arrested for sabotage and fraud.As the Aurora returns home, Captain Haddock steers the ship toward land to refuel not with oil, but with whisky.

== History ==
=== Background ===
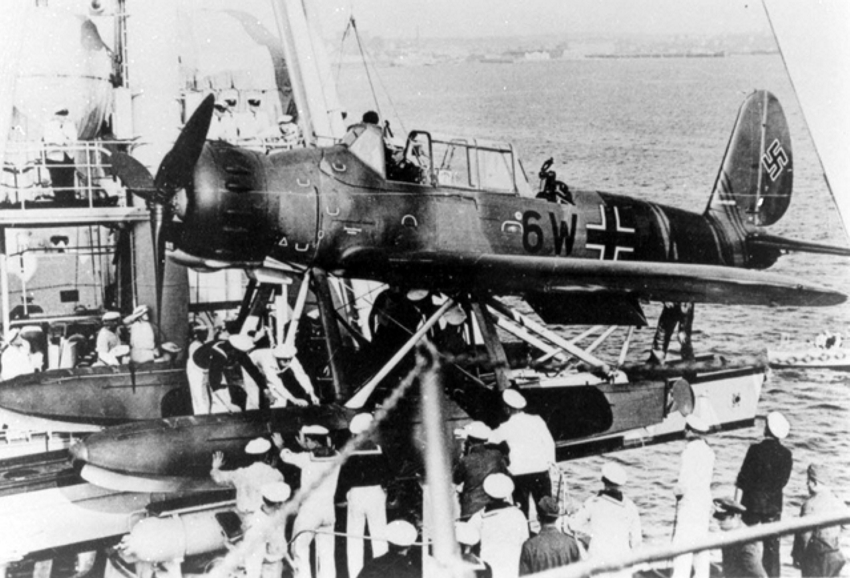
A German Arado 196 seaplane used by Hergé as inspiration for the type used by Tintin in the book

Amidst the German occupation of Belgium during World War II, Hergé became the founding editor of Le Soir Jeunesse, a children's supplement in Belgium's leading newspaper, Le Soir. (Note: Le Soir as published during the occupation was known by Belgians as Le Soir volé (The Stolen Soir) as it was published without the approval of its original owners, Rossel & Cie, who regained ownership after the Liberation.) Hergé's previous employer, the Catholic newspaper Le Vingtième Siècle (which had originated The Adventures of Tintin through its own children's supplement, Le Petit Vingtième) was no longer allowed by the German authorities to continue publishing; Le Soir, in contrast, was allowed to stay open under the administrative control of the occupying military government. Le Soir Jeunesse serialized most of The Shooting Star's immediate predecessor, The Crab with the Golden Claws, but ceased publication due to paper shortages in 1941. The Adventures of Tintin was then moved to Le Soir itself, where The Crab with the Golden Claws was concluded and the subsequent four Adventures (including The Shooting Star) were serialized.

During its initial serialization, The Shooting Star featured the United States as the primary antagonists; explaining this, Hergé asserted that the story revolved around the theme of "the rivalry for progress between Europe and the United States". Although not disliking Americans themselves, he had a strong disdain for American big business, and had exhibited anti-American themes in earlier works, in particular in Tintin in America. During serialisation of The Shooting Star, in December 1941, the U.S. entered the war on the side of the Allies, thus coming into direct conflict with Germany. All of the scientists featured were from Axis, neutral, or occupied countries which might be a reflection of the strip's anti-Allies political slant. Hergé biographer Harry Thompson stated this should not be interpreted as a strong anti-Ally bias, for the only two nation-states in Europe that were part of the Allies at that point were the Soviet Union and United Kingdom, and that the characters of Haddock and Chester were British.

As he had done for other Adventures of Tintin which featured sea travel, Hergé was careful to obtain as much data about ships as possible in order to make his portrayals more realistic. The design of the Aurora was based on the RRS William Scoresby, while that of the Peary was most likely based upon another Antarctic ship, the RRS Discovery. The seaplane on which the expedition travels was based on the German Arado 196-A. Hergé nevertheless later criticised his own efforts in this area, saying that if Aurora had been a real ship, it would probably be unseaworthy.

The Shooting Star shared plot similarities with The Chase of the Golden Meteor, a 1908 novel by pioneering French science-fiction writer Jules Verne. As in Hergé's story, Verne's novel features an expedition to the North Atlantic to find a meteorite fragment containing a new element. In both stories, the competing expedition teams were led by an eccentric professor and a Jewish banker, and Verne's novel had a Doktor Schultze to Hergé's Professor Schulze—both from the University of Jena. Hergé denied deliberately copying Verne's story, saying that he had only read one of the French novelist's works; it is possible that the influence from Verne came via Jacques Van Melkebeke, Hergé's friend and assistant, who was a fan of the genre. The Swedish expedition member Eric Björgenskjöld physically resembles a real person: Auguste Piccard, who later became Hergé's inspiration for Professor Calculus.

=== Antisemitism ===
"All I actually did was show a villainous financier with a Semitic appearance and a Jewish name: Blumenstein, in The Shooting Star. But does that mean there was anti-Semitism on my part? It seems to me that in my entire panoply of bad guys there are all sorts; I have shown a lot of "villains" of various origins, without any particular treatment of this or that race... We've always told Jewish stories, Marseillaise stories, Scottish stories. But who could have predicted that the Jewish stories would end as we know now that they did, in the death camps of Treblinka and Auschwitz?"

— Hergé to Numa Sadoul

Under Nazi control, Le Soir was publishing a variety of antisemitic articles, calling for the Jews to be further excluded from public life and describing them as racial enemies of the Belgian people. Hergé biographer Pierre Assouline noted that there was a "remarkable correlation" between the antisemitic nature of Le Soir's editorials and The Shooting Star's depiction of Jews. Within months of the story's publication, legislation was passed to collect and deport Jews from Belgium to Nazi concentration camps. Thus, The Shooting Star reflected trends in the Belgian political situation at the time. However, the story was not the first time that Hergé had adopted such a perspective in his work; he had recently provided illustrations for Robert de Vroyland's Fables, a number of which contained antisemitic stereotypes, reflecting the racism in much of de Vroyland's book. Similarly, his depiction of the character of Rastapopoulos, who was introduced in Tintin in America, has been cited as being based upon antisemitic stereotypes.

When The Shooting Star appeared in Le Soir, Hergé featured a gag in which two Jews hear the prophetic news that the end of the world is near. They rub their hands together in eagerness, and one comments: "Did you hear, Isaac? The end of the world! What if it's true?" The other responds: "Hey, hey, it vould be a gut ding, Solomon! I owe my suppliers 50,000 francs, and zis way I von't haf to pay vem!" Hergé omitted this scene from the collected edition.

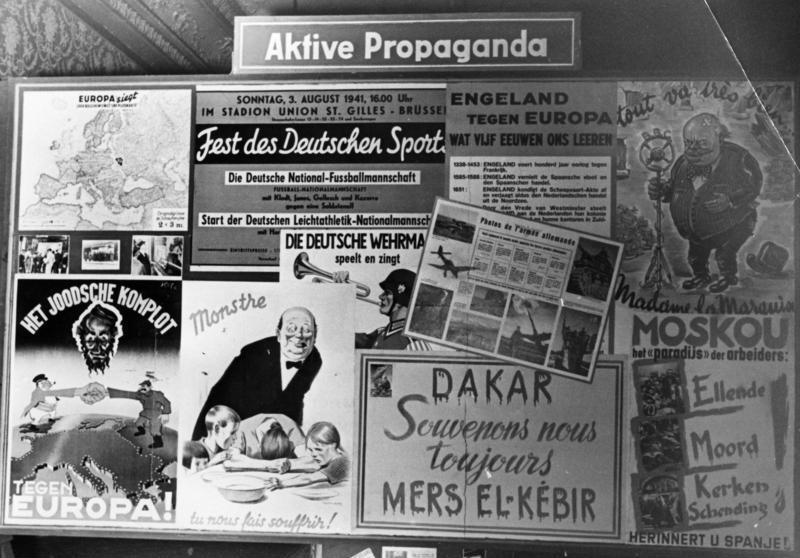
Anti-Semitic and anti-English propaganda on display in an exhibition in Brussels in 1941

The character of Blumenstein displays antisemitic stereotypes, such as having a bulbous nose and being an avaricious, manipulative businessman. Hergé later dismissed concerns over this Jewish caricature, saying "That was the style then". In his assessment of Franco-Belgian comics, Matthew Screech expressed the opinion that Blumenstein was an anti-American stereotype rather than an anti-Jewish one. Similarly, reporter and Tintin expert Michael Farr asserted that Blumenstein was "more parodied as a financier than Jew". Conversely, Lofficier and Lofficier asserted that both anti-Americanism and antisemitism were present, and that it is the United States and International Jewry who were the "ruthless opponents" of Tintin. Nazi apologists and revisionists such as French Holocaust denier Olivier Mathieu used The Shooting Star as evidence that Hergé was an antisemite with Nazi sympathies.

To graphic novel specialist Hugo Frey, the competing expeditions are presented as a simplistic race between good and evil, wherein Blumenstein displays the stereotypes of Jews held by advocates of the Jewish World Conspiracy presented in works such as the antisemitic Protocols of the Elders of Zion. Frey writes that Blumenstein's "large and bulbous nose ... rounded forehead, receding black hair, and small beady eyes" were stock antisemitic imagery in the 1930s and 1940s, as promoted by those such as journalist Édouard Drumont, whose antisemitic Paris-based newspaper La Libre Parole was influential in Brussels. According to Frey, Blumenstein's depiction as an overweight cigar-smoker reflected the antisemitic stereotype of Jews as being financially powerful, while he suggested that the scene in which Blumenstein learned that he was to be tracked down for his crimes recalled the contemporary roundup of Jews in Nazi Europe. Frey contrasts Hergé's complicity with the antisemites to the actions of other Belgians, such as those who struck against the Nazis at the Université libre de Bruxelles and those who risked their lives to hide Jews.

=== Publication ===
One of the politically loaded images. Initially, the antagonists were Americans (top), while later editions feature the flag of the fictitious country São Rico (bottom)

The Shooting Star was serialised daily in Le Soir from 20 October 1941 to 21 May 1942 in French under the title L'Étoile mystérieuse (The Mysterious Star). Tintin's previous adventure, The Crab with the Golden Claws, had been serialised weekly until the demise of Le Soir's children's supplement, Le Soir Jeunesse, before continuing daily in the main newspaper itself; the earlier serial had ended the day before The Shooting Star began. The Shooting Star was the first Tintin adventure to be serialised daily in its entirety. As with earlier Adventures of Tintin, the story was later serialised in France in the Catholic newspaper Cœurs Vaillants, where it first appeared on 6 June 1943.

On page 20 of the published book, Hergé included a cameo of the characters Thomson and Thompson and Quick & Flupke. The story also introduced Captain Chester, who is mentioned in later adventures, and Professor Cantonneau, who returns in The Seven Crystal Balls.

On 21 May 1942, The Shooting Star concluded serialisation. Less than a week later, the occupied government proclaimed that all Jews in Belgium would have to wear a yellow badge on their clothing, and in July the Gestapo began raids on Jewish premises, followed by deportations of Jews to Nazi concentration camps and extermination camps, resulting in around 32,000 Belgian Jews being killed. Hergé later recalled: "I saw very few Jews wearing the yellow star, but finally, I did see some. They told me that some Jews were gone; that people had come for them and sent them away. I didn't want to believe it".

The earlier Tintin albums reproduced the newspaper strips, which had come to appear weekly in Thursday supplements, two-page allotments of three tiers to a page. War shortages reduced the space for the strip by a third, and later the supplements disappeared completely; the comic appeared daily in the main newspaper as a four-panel strip. For publication in book form, Casterman insisted that Hergé must adhere to a new album format of four sixteen-page signatures, which gave sixty-two pages of story plus a cover page. Though the format reduced the page count, it maintained the same amount of story by reducing the size of the panels reproduced. As The Shooting Star progressed, Hergé cut up and laid out clippings of the strip in an exercise book in preparation for the new layouts. It was the first volume of The Adventures of Tintin to be originally published in the 62-page full-colour format that thereafter was the series standard (as opposed to first being published in a black and white newspaper strip reproduction format that all prior books had done). Casterman published the album in September 1942. Unlike the previous books in the series, because it was printed immediately in colour, it did not need to be totally redrawn. The 177 daily strips from the original serialisation were not enough to fill the 62 pages Casterman had allotted, so Hergé added large panels, such as a half-page panel of a giant telescope on page three. Hergé wanted to include a small gold star inside the "o" of "Étoile" on the cover page, but Casterman refused, deeming it too expensive.

In 1954, Hergé began making various changes to the story for its re-publication. Aware of the controversy surrounding the depiction of Blumenstein, he renamed the character "Bohlwinkel", adopting this name from bollewinkel, a Brussels dialect term for a confectionery store. He later discovered that, by coincidence, Bohlwinkel was also a Jewish name. Trying to tone down the book's anti-American sentiment, he also changed the United States to a fictional South American nation called São Rico, replacing the U.S. flag flown by the Peary's crew with that of the fictional state. In 1959, Hergé made a new list of changes to be made to the artwork in The Shooting Star, which included altering Bohlwinkel's nose, but the changes were postponed and never made.

== Adaptations ==
In 1957, the animation company Belvision Studios produced a string of colour adaptations based on Hergé's original comics, adapting eight of the Adventures into a series of daily five-minute episodes. The Shooting Star was the sixth to be adapted in the second animated series; it was directed by Ray Goossens and written by Greg, a well-known cartoonist who was to become editor-in-chief of Tintin magazine.

In 1991, a second animated series based upon The Adventures of Tintin was produced, this time as a collaboration between the French studio Ellipse and the Canadian animation company Nelvana. The Shooting Star was the eighth story to be adapted and was a single twenty-minute episode. Directed by Stéphane Bernasconi, the series has been praised for being "generally faithful" to the original comics, to the extent that the animation was directly adopted from Hergé's original panels. Bohlwinkel was tactfully kept nameless in the adaptation and his arrest is shown.

In 2010, American cartoonist Charles Burns authored X'ed Out, a graphic novel with a variety of allusions to The Adventures of Tintin. In one scene, the protagonist Nitnit discovers a warehouse containing white eggs with red spots, akin to the mushrooms in The Shooting Star, with the cover of Burns' book paying homage to Hergé. In 2015, the original front cover sketch of the book was sold for €2.5 million to a European investor, Marina David of Petits Papiers-Huberty-Breyne, at the Brussels Antiques and Fine Art Fair.

== Critical analysis ==
"The Shooting Star remains to this day a blot on Hergé's record. How did the man who had so eloquently defended the Native Americans in Tintin in America and the Chinese in The Blue Lotus, who only three years before denounced fascism in King Ottokar's Sceptre, become a propagandist for the Axis remains hard to understand. It did not have to be that way".

— Randy and Jean-Marc Lofficier

Pierre Assouline remarked that Hergé's attention to accuracy lapsed in The Shooting Star. For instance, the meteorite's approach toward Earth caused a heat wave, while the meteorite itself proceeded to float on the surface of the ocean. In reality, no such heat wave would have been caused, while the meteorite would have plunged to the sea floor, causing a tsunami. He noted that the concept of madness was a recurring theme throughout the story, and that there was "an unreality in the whole adventure". Fellow biographer Benoît Peeters asserted that The Shooting Star was "of great power and brilliant construction". Elsewhere, Peeters wrote that the book was "notable for the entry of the fantastic into Hergé's work".

Jean-Marc and Randy Lofficier deemed the antisemitism a "sad moment" in the series, awarding the story one out of five stars. Nevertheless, they felt that the "pre-apocalyptic ambiance is stark and believable", and that the giant mushrooms on the meteorite were a "strange anticipation" of the mushroom-clouds produced by the atomic bombings in 1945. Focusing on the characters of Professor Phostle and Philippulus, they asserted that both resembled Sophocles Sarcophagus from Cigars of the Pharaoh and that the former was "in the Jules Verne tradition" of eccentric professors. According to philosopher Pascal Bruckner, Tintin experts find Philippulus a caricature of Marshal of France Philippe Pétain, who demanded the French repent imaginary sins when he took power. Philippe Goddin stated that the strips for this story "kept the reader daily on tenterhooks in a story replete with new twists and humour".

Harry Thompson described The Shooting Star as "the most important of all Hergé's wartime stories", having "an air of bizarre fantasy" that was unlike his prior work. He observed that the character of Professor Phostle was a prototype for Professor Calculus, introduced later in the series. Michael Farr asserted that the apocalyptic setting of the story reflected the wartime mood in Europe. He characterises the opening pages of the story as being "unique in [Hergé's] work for the feeling of foreboding they convey", adding that "Hergé daringly eschews the strip cartoonist's recognised means of denoting a dream, deliberately confusing the reader". He felt that the "flow of the narrative is less accomplished" than in other stories, with "spurts and rushes followed by slower passages, upsetting the rhythm and pace".

Literary critic Jean-Marie Apostolidès psychoanalysed The Shooting Star, describing it as "the final attempt of the foundling [i.e. Tintin] to rid himself of the bastard [i.e. Haddock] and to preserve the integrity of his former values", pointing out that the first thirteen pages are devoted purely to the boy reporter. He also argued that Phostle and Philippus represent two-halves of "an ambivalent father figure" within the story, with the former prefiguring Calculus "more than any other previous character". He suggests that when hiding on the Aurora, Philippus can be compared to The Phantom of the Opera, as he steals a stick of dynamite and climbs up the ship's mast before threatening to detonate the weapon. Apostolidès believed that the shooting star itself is "more a religious mystery than a scientific one" and that Tintin is therefore "the perfect one to figure it out in some religious way—that is, unrealistically". Apostolidès analysed the political component of the story in terms of "the incarnation of unregulated capitalism against the spirit of European values", arguing that Hergé was adhering to "a utopian vision that, in 1942, smacks of pro-German propaganda".

Literary critic Tom McCarthy believed that The Shooting Star represents the apex of the "right-wing strain" in Hergé's work. He highlighted the instance in which Tintin impersonates God in order to give commands to Philippus as representing one of various occasions in The Adventures of Tintin where "sacred authority manifests itself largely as a voice, and commanding—or commandeering—that voice is what guarantees power". McCarthy further observes that the image of a giant spider in a ball of fire, which appears near the start of the story, reflects the theme of madness that is again present throughout the series. Discussing the political elements of Hergé's series, McCarthy also noted that in the original publication of the story, the spider which climbed in front of the observatory telescope and was thus magnified greatly was initially termed Aranea Fasciata; he saw this as an intentional satire of the threat to Europe posed by fascism.
