= Speake =

Speake may refer to:

- Speake, Alabama, an unincorporated community in Lawrence County, Alabama, United States

== People with the surname ==
- Bob Speake (born 1930), American baseball player
- George Speake, English historian
- Jennifer Speake (born 1944), reference book editor

== See also ==
- Speke (disambiguation)
