= Richard Haddock =

Royal Navy Officer (1629-1715)

Admiral Sir Richard Haddock
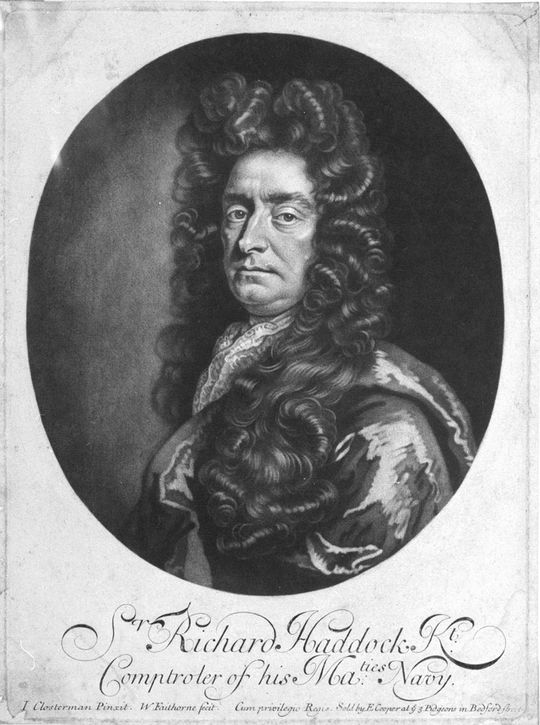
- Born: Born 1629; Leigh-on-Sea
- Died: 26 January 1714 (aged 84 or 85); London
- Relatives: Nicholas Haddock (son)
- Military career
- Allegiance: Kingdom of England; Kingdom of Great Britain
- Branch: Royal Navy
- Service years: 1656 – 1714
- Rank: Admiral
- Commands: English ship Dragon; HMS Portland; HMS Royal James; HMS Lion; HMS Royal Charles; HMS Duke
- Conflicts: Holmes's Bonfire; Battle of Solebay; Battle of Schooneveld; Battle of Texel
- Awards: Knighthood

Admiral Sir Richard Haddock (c. 1629 – 26 January 1715 Old Style) was an officer of the Royal Navy. He served during the Anglo-Dutch Wars, eventually rising to the rank of Admiral in August 1690.

== Family and early life ==
Haddock was born into a distinguished navy family. His grandfather, also Richard Haddock, had been rewarded by the government in 1652, having held commands under both Charles I and subsequently the Parliamentary regime; he commanded the Victory in 1642, the Antelope in 1643–44, the John in 1644 and the Unicorn in 1648. In 1652 he served as Vice-Admiral commanding the Vanguard. His father, William Haddock, also commanded trading vessels, and was appointed on 14 March 1651 to command the America, a ship hired by the Commonwealth of England Navy. He served in the First Anglo–Dutch War and saw action in 1653. For his services he was awarded a gold medal. William initially lived in Deptford but subsequently moved to Kent. He had a number of children, several of whom followed him into the navy, including his son Richard.

== Command ==
Haddock's ship, the Royal James, is burnt by Dutch fireships.

Richard Haddock had command of English ship Dragon from 1656 to 1660 but was then unemployed until 1666 when he took command of the 50-gun HMS Portland on 14 June 1666. During this period, he was given command of one of the companies involved in the attacks on Ulie and Schelling in August 1666. He relinquished command of the Portland on 9 November 1667.

Prior to the outbreak of the Third Anglo-Dutch War in 1672 Haddock became captain of the 100-gun HMS Royal James on 18 January of that year; he was her captain at the Battle of Solebay on 28 May. The Royal James was the flagship of Admiral Sir Edward Montagu, 1st Earl of Sandwich. The Royal James led the van of the Blue Squadron and attacked Willem Joseph van Ghent's ship. She was then engaged by a number of other Dutch warships and fireships. Despite fighting several of them off and forcing Rear-Admiral Jan van Brakel's ship to disengage, the Royal James was set on fire by the Dutch. Haddock was wounded in the foot, and on seeing that the ship was doomed, attempted to persuade the Earl to abandon ship. Montagu refused, and Haddock jumped overboard. He survived to be picked up and transferred to another English warship. Montagu was killed in the wreck.

Haddock returned to London and attended a meeting with King Charles II. There the King bestowed a mark of favour on Haddock for his actions during the battle, taking a satin cap from his head and placing it upon Haddock's. The cap was kept in the family for many years, with a note describing

This satin cap was given by King Charles the second, in the year 1672, to Sir Richard Haddock, after the English battle with the Dutch, when he had been captain of the Royal James, under the command of the Earl of Sandwich, which ship was burnt, and Sir Richard had been wounded. Given him on his return to London.

Haddock assumed command of the Third rate HMS Lion on 7 November 1672 and remained with her until the following 1 February. He was then given command on 2 February 1673 of the brand new First rate HMS Royal Charles, flagship of Prince Rupert of the Rhine. He fought at the Battles of Schooneveld on 28 May and 4 June 1673 (Old Style; 7 and 14 June New Style). Immediately following this second action, on 5 June 1673 he was switched to command HMS Royal Sovereign, but relinquished command of the Royal Sovereign on 30 June, and was quickly appointed to be an Extra Commissioner of the Navy on 18 August 1673.

He was knighted on 3 July 1675. Haddock was appointed Comptroller of the Navy on 2 February 1682, an appointment he retained until 17 April 1686. He also became commander of HMS Duke on 3 June 1682, but this last sea command only lasted 18 days, ending on 21 June.

== Political life and later offices ==
In 1683 he was appointed first Commissioner of the Victualling Office, a post he held until 1690. He entered politics in 1678, being elected to represent Aldeburgh. He became the representative for New Shoreham in 1685, and just before the accession of King William III he again became Controller of the Navy on 12 October 1688, a post he held until his death on 29 January 1714. He was appointed joint Commander-in-Chief of the fleet sent to Ireland in 1690, alongside Vice Admiral Henry Killigrew and Sir John Ashby. They commanded the fleet from the third rate HMS Kent. They remained in command until the winter when the fleet returned to Britain. They resigned their commissions and were replaced by Admiral Edward Russell. Haddock went into retirement from active service, dying in London on 26 January 1715. He was buried on 6 February in the churchyard of St Clement's Church, Leigh-on-Sea.

== Relations ==
Sir Richard married, firstly, Elizabeth (known as "Lydia") Wilkinson, daughter of Henry Wilkinson and Joan (or Jean) Cannon, on 13 February 1648 at St Katharine's by the Tower. They had three children, Jeane (married John Greene in 1672), John (who went to America), and Richard. Sir Richard married, secondly, Elizabeth Hurleston, daughter of Adm. Nicholas Hurleston and Anna Moyer, on 24 July 1671 at St Botolph-without-Bishopsgate and had seven children; Martha who married Dennis Lyddoll; Capt. Richard b. abt 1673 - 21 April 1751; William; Elizabeth; Capt. Joseph Haddock; Adm. of the Blue Nicholas Haddock (1685–1746); Lydia.

Sir Richard's nephew, also named Richard, served in the navy and commanded the fireship Anne and Christopher at the Battle of Solebay, being commended for his bravery. Sir Richard's brother, Joseph Haddock, also had a naval career as a Lieutenant during the Third Anglo-Dutch War, later commanding HMS Swallow in 1678.

Sir Richard's eldest son (by his second wife), another Richard, followed his father into the navy and in April 1734 was appointed to his father's old post of Comptroller of the Navy.

Sir Richard's third son, Nicholas, ended a distinguished naval career with the rank of Admiral of the Blue.

== Hergé's Adventures of Tintin ==
In Hergé's Adventures of Tintin, Richard Haddock may have been an inspiration for Captain Haddock's 17th century ancestor, Sir Francis Haddock.

== Notes ==
Parliament of England
Preceded by John Bence; John Holland	Member of Parliament for Aldeburgh; 1679; With: Henry Johnson	Succeeded by John Bence; John Corrance
Preceded by John Hales; Robert Fagg	Member of Parliament for New Shoreham; 1685–1689; With: Edward Hungerford	Succeeded by Edward Hungerford; John Monke
