= Henry Priestman (Royal Navy officer) =

Captain Henry Priestman
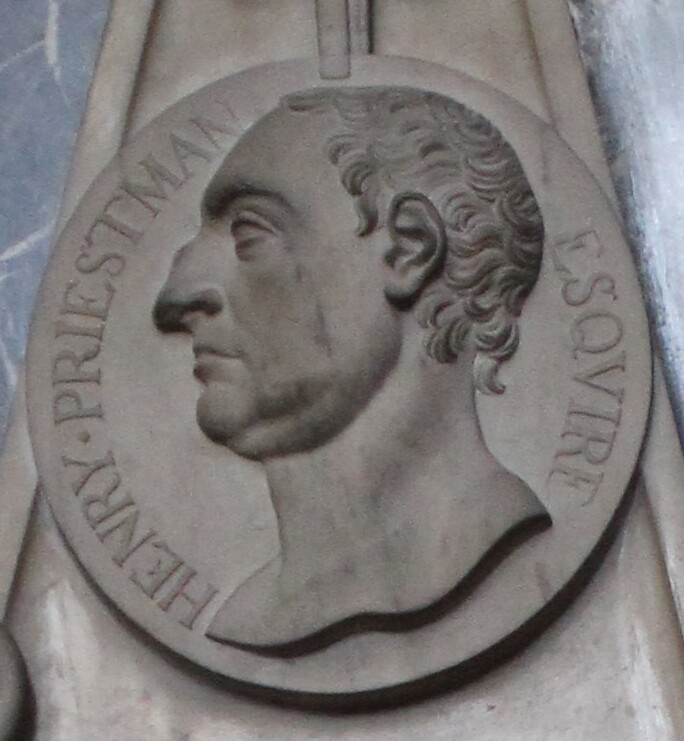
- Depiction in Priestman's monument, Westminster Abbey
- Born: c.1647
- Died: 20 August 1712 (aged 64–65)
- Military career
- Allegiance: Kingdom of England
- Branch: Royal Navy
- Service years: 1672–1699
- Rank: Captain
- Commands: HMS Antelope; HMS Richmond; HMS Lark; HMS Swan; HMS Reserve; HMS Bonaventure; Commander-in-Chief of ships in the Straits; HMS Hampton Court

Captain Henry Priestman (ca. 1647 - 20 August 1712) was a Royal Navy officer and politician who sat in the House of Commons from 1695 to 1698.

== Naval career ==
Priestman joined the Royal Navy in 1672 and his first command was the fourth-rate HMS Antelope. In August 1673 he was promoted to the command of the sixth-rate HMS Richmond. In a time of relative peace he saw no action and went to the Mediterranean in 1675 in command of the sixth-rate HMS Lark. In January 1678 he was appointed to the fifth-rate HMS Swan, and later in the year returned to HMS Antelope. In 1681, he commanded the fourth-rate HMS Reserve, and in May 1683 was appointed to the fourth-rate HMS Bonaventure. Soon after he was appointed Commodore and Commander-in-Chief of ships in the Straits. In 1688, he was placed in command of the third-rate HMS Hampton Court and after the Glorious Revolution, to which he was sympathetic, he became Comptroller of the Storekeeper's Accounts in 1689.

Priestman was elected Member of Parliament (MP) for New Shoreham in 1695 and held the seat until 1698. He joined the Board of Admiralty led by the Earl of Pembroke in June 1690 and was advanced to First Naval Lord in January 1691. Priestman left the Admiralty Board in May 1699, following the departure from office of his friend, the Earl of Orford, who was highly criticised for financial abuse. Priestman died on 20 August 1712, aged 65; there is a monument to him in Westminster Abbey by the sculptor Francis Bird.

== Sources ==
- Rodger, N.A.M. (1979). The Admiralty. Offices of State. Lavenham: T. Dalton Ltd. ISBN 0900963948.

Parliament of England
Preceded by Sir Edward Hungerford; John Perry	Member of Parliament for New Shoreham; 1695–1698; With: John Perry	Succeeded by John Perry; Charles Sergison
Military offices
Preceded by Edward Russell	Senior Naval Lord; 1691–1694	Succeeded by Earl of Orford
