= Speke (disambiguation) =

Speke is a district in Liverpool, England.

Speke may also refer to:

== Places ==
- Speke (Liverpool ward), an electoral division of the Liverpool City Council
- Speke Hall, a historic manor house in Speke, Liverpool
- Speke railway station, Liverpool
- Speke Resort and Conference Center, Kampala, Uganda
- Mount Speke, a mountain in the Ruwenzori Range, Uganda

== People ==
- Speke (surname), a list of notable people with the name
- Speke baronets, 17th century

== Other uses ==
- SPEKE (Simple Password Exponential Key Exchange), a cryptographic protocol
- Speke (ship), several ships

== See also ==
- Speak (disambiguation)
