= Sir George Speke, 2nd Baronet =

English Politician

Sir George Speke, 2nd Baronet (1 October 1653 – 14 January 1683) was an English politician who sat in the House of Commons between 1675 and 1683.

Speke was the son of Sir Hugh Speke, 1st Baronet of Hasilbury, Wiltshire and his wife Anne Croke, daughter of John Mayne or Mayney of Staplehurst, Kent. He succeeded his father in the baronetcy in 1661.

In 1675, Speke was elected Member of Parliament for Bath in the Cavalier Parliament. He was re-elected MP for Bath in the two elections of 1679. In 1681 he was elected MP for Chippenham.

Speke died at the age of 29 and was buried in the church at Box, Wiltshire when the Baronetcy became extinct.

Speke married Rachael Wyndham, daughter of Sir William Wyndham, 1st Baronet and his wife Frances Hungerford, daughter of Anthony Hungerford. She later married Richard Musgrave, and died in or before December 1711.

Parliament of England
Preceded by Sir Francis Popham; Sir William Bassett	Member of Parliament for Bath; 1675–1681; With: Sir William Bassett 1675–1679; Sir Walter Long, 2nd Baronet 1679–1681	Succeeded by The Viscount Fitzhardinge; Sir William Bassett
Preceded by Edward Hungerford; Samuel Ashe	Member of Parliament for Chippenham; 1681–1683; With: Edward Hungerford	Succeeded by Henry Bayntun; Sharington Talbot
Baronetage of England
Preceded by Hugh Speke	Baronet (of Hamilbury); 1661–1683	Extinct
