= Henry Bayntun (died 1672) =

English politician (1621–1672)

Henry Bayntun (1621–1672) was an English politician who sat in the House of Commons between 1661 and 1672.

Bayntun, baptised 14 November 1621, was the son of Sir Edward Bayntun of Bromham, Wiltshire and his first wife Elizabeth Maynard, daughter of Sir Henry Maynard of Eaton, Essex. He matriculated at St John's College, Oxford on 7 December 1638, aged 14. He travelled abroad from 1640 to 1643 and was a captain of horse in the Royalist army from 1643 to 1644.

In 1661, Bayntun was elected Member of Parliament for Chippenham for the Cavalier Parliament in a double return. He was allowed to sit on the merits of the return until the election was declared void a month later. He was then re-elected as MP for Chippenham.

Bayntun died at the age of about 50 and was buried at Bromham on 10 November 1672.

Bayntun married Joanna Trimnell daughter of Edmund Trimnell, yeoman, of Hanger, Bremhill, Wiltshire by 1653. They had a son Edward and two daughters and she died in 1675. Bayntun was the brother of Edward Bayntun and half-brother of Nicholas Bayntun.

Parliament of England
Preceded by Edward Hungerford; Edward Poole	Member of Parliament for Chippenham; 1661; With: Edward Hungerford 1661; Sir Hugh Speke, 1st Baronet 1661; Edward Hungerford 1661–1673	Succeeded by Edward Hungerford; Francis Gwyn
