= Charles Sergison =

English Royal Navy administrator and politician

Thomas Warden's Name Act 1732
- Act of Parliament
- Parliament of Great Britain
- Long title: An Act to enable Thomas Warden Esquire and the Heirs of his Body, and the several other Persons therein named, and the Heirs of their respective Bodies, to take and use the Surname of Sergison, as therein mentioned.
- Citation: 6 Geo. 2. c. 18 Pr.
- Territorial extent: Great Britain

Dates
- Royal assent: 17 May 1733
- Commencement: 16 January 1733 (Note: Start of session.)

Status: Current legislation

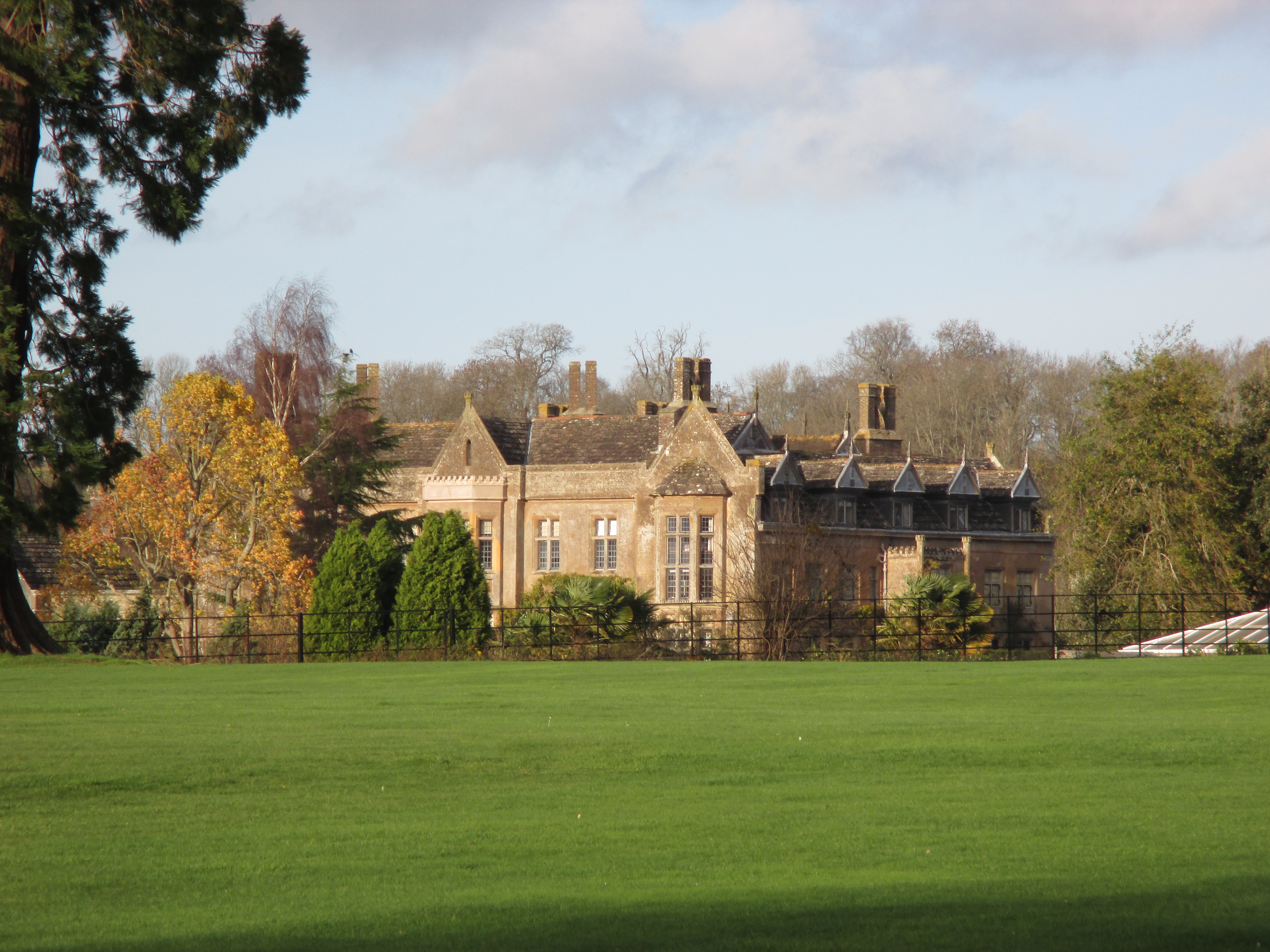
Cuckfield Park, Sergison's home in later life

Charles Sergison (11 January 1655 – 26 November 1732) was an English Royal Navy administrator and politician who sat in the House of Commons from 1698 to 1702.

Sergison became a clerk in one of the Royal Naval dockyards in 1671 and by 1685 was a principal officer and commissioner of the Royal Navy. In 1693 he occupied Cuckfield Place House (now Cuckfield Park) in Sussex which he later purchased from the Bowyer family. He lived at Cuckfield Place until his death

In 1698, Sergison was elected Member of Parliament (MP) for New Shoreham. He held the seat until 1702.

Sergison continued to work in the Admiralty as Clerk of the Accounts until his retirement in 1719. He built a large collection of papers relating to Admiralty orders to the Navy Board between 1603 and 1717. These papers have subsequently been published.

Sergison died without issue at Cuckfield aged 77 and was buried at Holy Trinity Church. The bulk of his estate passed to his great-nephew Thomas Warden, who had married one of his nieces, and who assumed the surname of Sergison thereafter by a private act of Parliament, Thomas Warden's Name Act 1732 (6 Geo. 2. c. 18 Pr.). His house, Cuckfield Park, stayed within the Sergison family until the early 1970s.

== Notes ==
Parliament of England
Preceded by Henry Priestman; John Perry	Member of Parliament for New Shoreham; 1698–1702; With: John Perry	Succeeded by Nathaniel Gould
