= Speke baronets =

Extinct baronetcy in the Baronetage of England

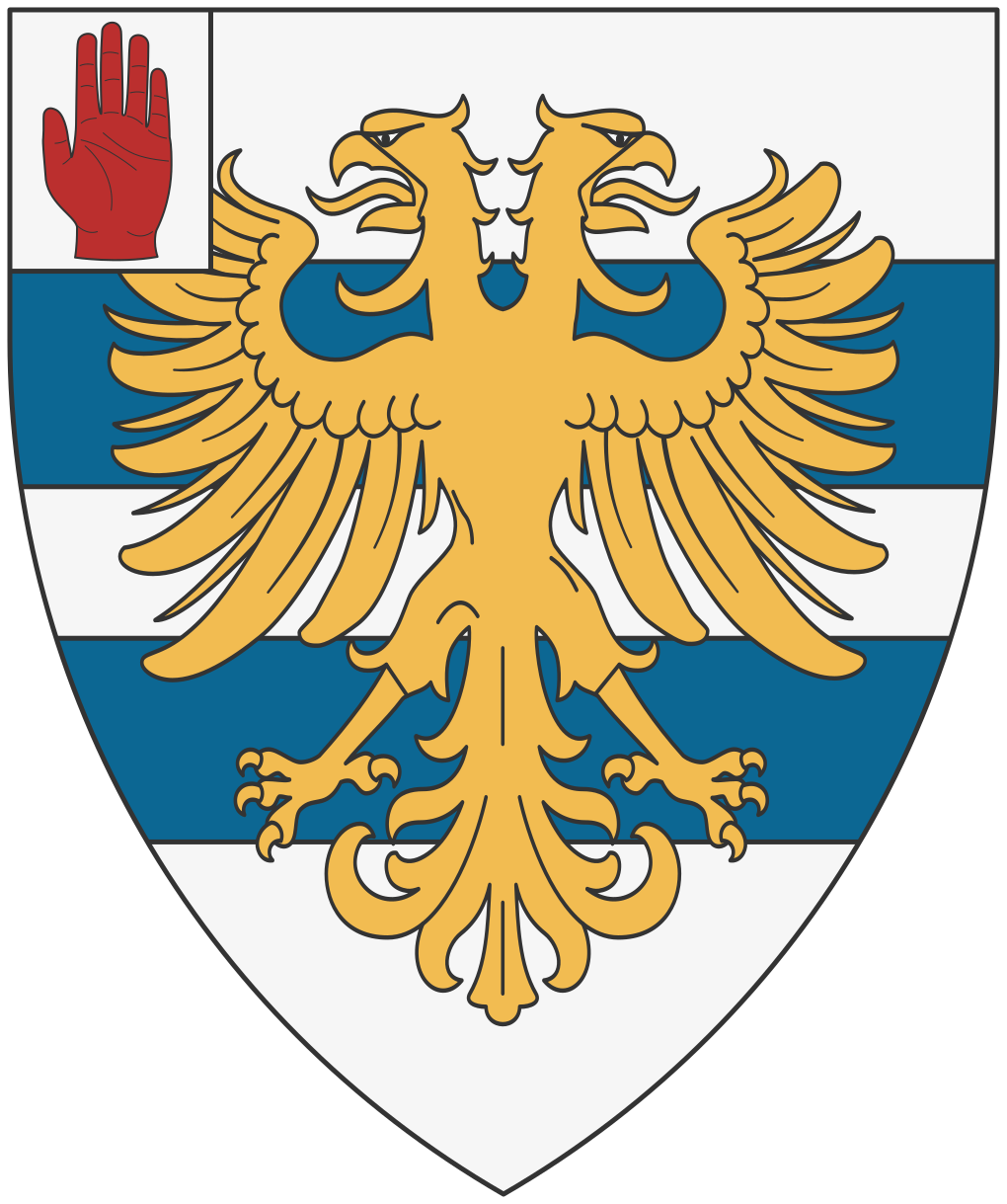
The coat of arms of the Spekes of Hamilbury

The Speke Baronetcy, of Hamilbury in the County of Wiltshire, was a title in the Baronetage of England. It was created on 12 June 1660 for Hugh Speke, later Member of Parliament for Chippenham. The second Baronet sat as member of parliament for Bath and Chippenham. The title became extinct on his death in 1683.

== Speke baronets, of Hamilbury (1660) ==
- Sir Hugh Speke, 1st Baronet (died 1661)
- Sir George Speke, 2nd Baronet (1653–1683)
