= John Perry (MP) =

English merchant and politician

John Perry (ca. 1639 – 29 March 1732) was an English merchant and politician who sat in the House of Commons between 1690 and 1705.

Perry was a London merchant who had interests in the East India Company and the Royal African Company.

Perry was elected Member of Parliament (MP) for New Shoreham in 1690 and held the seat until 1701 when he was defeated. He stood unsuccessfully in a second election in 1701 and was returned again for New Shoreham in 1702. He held the seat until 1705 when he was again defeated.

Perry died 29 March 1732.

Parliament of England
Preceded by Sir Edward Hungerford	Member of Parliament for New Shoreham; 1690–1700; With: Sir Edward Hungerford 1690–1695; Henry Priestman 1695–1698; Charles Sergison 1698–1700	Succeeded by Charles Sergison; Nathaniel Gould
Preceded by Charles Sergison; Nathaniel Gould	Member of Parliament for New Shoreham; 1702–1705; With: Nathaniel Gould	Succeeded by Nathaniel Gould; John Wicker
