= Sir Hugh Speke, 1st Baronet =

Sir Hugh Speke, 1st Baronet (died 5 July 1661) was an English politician who sat in the House of Commons in 1661.

Speke was the son of George Speke of Hasilbury, Wiltshire, and his wife Margaret Tempest, daughter of William Tempest, of Soudton, Oxfordshire. He was knighted and was created baronet on 12 June 1660. In 1661, he was elected Member of Parliament for Chippenham in the Cavalier Parliament.

Speke died in 1661 and was buried in the church at Box, Wiltshire.

Speke married Anne Croke, daughter of John Mayne or Mayney of Staplehurst, Kent, in or before 1653. He was succeeded in the baronetcy by his son George.

Parliament of England
Preceded by Edward Hungerford; Henry Bayntun	Member of Parliament for Chippenham; 1661; With: Henry Bayntun	Succeeded by Edward Hungerford; Henry Bayntun
Baronetage of England
New creation	Baronet (of Hamilbury); 1660–1661	Succeeded by George Speke
