= Snowy (character) =

Comic character by Belgian cartoonist Hergé

- Tintin and his dog Snowy in a panel of Tintin in the Land of the Soviets, their first appearance, by Hergé

Publication information
- Publisher: Casterman (Belgium)
- First appearance: Tintin in the Land of the Soviets (1929); The Adventures of Tintin
- Created by: Hergé

In-story information
- Full name: Snowy (Milou in the original French)
- Species: Dog (Wire Fox Terrier)
- Partnerships: List of main characters
- Supporting character of: Tintin

Snowy (French: Milou [milu]) is a fictional character in The Adventures of Tintin, the comics series by Belgian cartoonist Hergé. Snowy is a white Wire Fox Terrier who is a companion to Tintin, the series' protagonist. Snowy made his debut on 10 January 1929 in the first installment of Tintin in the Land of the Soviets, which was serialised in Le Petit Vingtième until May 1930.

Snowy is modeled in part on a Fox Terrier at a café that Hergé used to frequent. Milou, Snowy's original French name, was the nickname of Hergé's first girlfriend.

In the first eight Tintin adventures, Snowy regularly addresses his internal monologue to the reader. Hergé diminished Snowy's speaking role after the introduction of Captain Haddock in the ninth story, The Crab with the Golden Claws. As of 1 January 2025, Snowy and other characters appearing in the 1929 The Adventures of Tintin comic strips have entered the public domain in the United States, but not in Hergé's native Belgium, which will be in 2054.

== Inspiration and design ==
Hergé never had a dog in his family until his last years; however, in 1929 he was a regular at a café where the proprietor had a terrier. This dog was a major source of inspiration for Snowy.

Snowy's original French name Milou—an abbreviation of Marie-Louise—is borrowed from the nickname of Hergé's first girlfriend, Marie-Louise Van Cutsem. Marie-Louise's father disapproved of Hergé's low social standing, and the young couple's relationship consequently deteriorated. Nevertheless, Hergé remained fond of Marie-Louise, and made her the namesake of Tintin's most trusted friend. The name Snowy was chosen for English-language translations not only because of the dog's colour, but also because it is a five-letter word that fits in the speech balloons.

== Character ==
Throughout the series, Snowy is Tintin's sidekick and companion on journeys. Along with Tintin he is the only character to appear in all of the comic albums. In the debut album Tintin in the Land of the Soviets, Snowy is a source of comic relief. Throughout the first eight stories Snowy is the series' co-star; he is able to understand human language, and communicates with speech bubbles. His verbal responses to various situations include jokes, expressions of fright, and pleas to Tintin to exercise caution. In the early albums he takes an interest in mechanics and geography; in Tintin in the Congo, he makes biblical references. As a dog, he also sniffs, tracks, chases, and bites.

The character of Snowy evolved through the course of the Tintin series. In early works he exchanges dialog with other characters, including animals, and provides a running commentary on the situation. His character then became affected by the introduction of Captain Haddock in The Crab with the Golden Claws. Before Haddock's appearance, Snowy was the source of dry and cynical side-commentary, which balanced out Tintin's constantly positive, optimistic perspective. When Haddock entered the series, the Captain took over the role of the cynic, and Snowy gradually shifted into a more light-hearted role, having dialog only with Tintin.

Snowy is portrayed as brave and is often fearless against much larger creatures when Tintin is threatened. He repeatedly frees Tintin from captivity and saves him from dangerous situations, and will sometimes identify a villain before Tintin. The Black Island and The Shooting Star show that his only fear is arachnophobia. Snowy is loyal to Tintin and always wishes to stay by his master's side: in a scene in The Shooting Star when Tintin temporarily abandoned him, Snowy was inconsolable.

Snowy loves whiskey, and occasionally gets drunk (as occurred in Tintin in the Land of the Soviets, The Black Island, Tintin in Tibet and Tintin and the Picaros). His appetite for food is the basis for several short, comical sequences. The dog's biggest lust is for bones. This is repeatedly the centre of moral dilemmas, as Snowy has to decide between carrying out important tasks, such as carrying an SOS message, and picking up a bone, as evidenced in King Ottokar's Sceptre and Tintin in Tibet. Snowy indulges in rowdy behaviour chasing the Siamese cat at Marlinspike Hall until the two become friends at the end of The Calculus Affair. Snowy often adds to the story in notable ways. For instance, Snowy is the only character in Flight 714 to Sydney to escape mass hypnosis and to know of their abduction by aliens.

== Adaptations ==
Snowy as he appears in Steven Spielberg's 2011 motion capture feature film The Adventures of Tintin: The Secret of the Unicorn

At the end of the run of Tintin in the Land of the Soviets on 8 May 1930, a mock reception for Snowy and Tintin was conducted at Brussels' Gare du Nord railway station. There Snowy was played by Hergé's cafékeeper's Fox Terrier. In The Adventures of Tintin television series, Snowy is voiced by Susan Roman. However, Snowy's comments are not present.

Among the anthropomorphic cast of Bryan Talbot's graphic novel Grandville, there is a white Wire Fox Terrier named "Snowy Milou". In a drug-induced delirium, he describes the dreams he has had, with close parallels to the various adventures of the Tintin books.

From a computer-generated imagery point of view, Snowy was the most difficult character to film during production of the 2011 motion capture film The Adventures of Tintin. At that time, fur was generally difficult to render, with white being the most difficult colour and curly fur being the most difficult shape. Another issue was Snowy is always shown at particular angles, which made it difficult to make him recognisable with moving camera shots. Early in the development process, when the motion-capture was being filmed in-studio, the production team considered casting a dog as Snowy. Instead a puppet was used, acted out by a puppeteer. Thus, the actors worked with the puppet placeholder; Snowy and the other characters were then animated afterwards.

== Statues and commemorative murals ==
- A mural on a building at Rue de l'Etuve recreates a scene of Tintin, Captain Haddock and Snowy coming down a building fire escape from The Calculus Affair.
- The Gare du Midi station in Brussels contains a huge reproduction of a panel from Tintin in America.
- The Le Lombard building in Central Brussels (Near Gare du Midi) has two giant heads of Snowy and Tintin on the roof. These are lit up with neon lights at night. Lombard was the editor of the Journal de Tintin.
- The Stockel subway station in Brussels has huge panels with scenes from Tintin comic books painted as murals.
- The Uccle cultural center (Rue Rouge) in Belgium has a life size statue of Tintin and Snowy. The statue was sculpted by Nat Neujeun and commissioned by Raymond Leblanc, the publisher of Tintin.

== See also ==
- List of The Adventures of Tintin characters
- List of fictional dogs
