= Sharington Talbot =

English Member of Parliament and Militia officer

Sharington Talbot (c. 1656-1685), of Lacock Abbey, Wiltshire, was an English Member of Parliament (MP) and Militia officer who fought against Monmouth's rebels and was killed in a duel.

He was elected one of the MPs for Chippenham in 1685.

In 1685 he was the Major of the Wiltshire Militia Horse during the Monmouth Rebellion. Talbot and his troop were operating in the Chew Valley with Colonel Theophilus Oglethorpe with 100 troopers of the Horse Guards to overawe the population. On 25 June the Duke of Monmouth crossed the River Avon at Keynsham but was attacked from north and south by bodies of Royal horse. From the south Oglethorpe launched his regular troopers into Keynsham, causing casualties and great confusion to the rebel army, then withdrew, covered by Talbot's men who had been posted for the purpose. Disheartened, Monmouth turned away from Keynsham.

After the Battle of Sedgemoor had been won, the Wiltshire Militia were at Glastonbury on 8 July. At the White Hart Major Talbot fell into a dispute with a Captain Love over whose soldiers had done best; apparently the effectiveness of Talbot's men at Keynsham was questioned. Both officers drew their swords and Talbot was killed. Love fled the scene.
