= Captain Haddock =

Comic character by Belgian cartoonist Hergé

- Captain Haddock (Capitaine Haddock) from The Seven Crystal Balls by Hergé

Publication information
- Publisher: Casterman (Belgium)
- First appearance: The Crab with the Golden Claws (1941); The Adventures of Tintin
- Created by: Hergé

In-story information
- Full name: Archibald Haddock
- Partnerships: List of main characters
- Supporting character of: Tintin

Captain Archibald Haddock (French: Capitaine Archibald Haddock) is a character in the comic book series The Adventures of Tintin. He is Tintin's best friend, a sea captain in the merchant navy, and was introduced in The Crab with the Golden Claws. Haddock was initially depicted as a weak and alcoholic character, but in later albums he became more respectable and genuinely heroic (notably in the seminal Tintin in Tibet, where he soberly volunteers his life to save his friend). Although when introduced Haddock has command of a freighter, in later volumes he is clearly retired. The Captain's coarse humanity and sarcasm acts as a counterpoint to Tintin's often implausible heroism; he is always quick with a dry comment whenever the boy reporter gets too idealistic.

== History ==
Captain Haddock was introduced in The Crab with the Golden Claws, depicted as a weak and alcoholic character. Up until Haddock's introduction, supporting characters would recur with irregularity, and mainly in the background, used more to build continuity than serve as protagonists. Hergé however realised Haddock's potential as a foil to Tintin, and established the character as a permanent addition to the cast. This was at the expense of Snowy, whose role was reduced to accommodate Haddock.

Haddock's character swiftly grew from his beginnings. In his initial adventure he is almost as hazardous to Tintin as the villains of the piece. He is shown as short-tempered, given to emotional and expletive-ridden outbursts, and capable of infuriating actions. However, the character is also portrayed as a kindly soul in need of reform, and by the end of the adventure Tintin has managed to reform the alcoholic and gained himself a loyal companion, albeit one still given to uttering the occasional expletive.

Hergé also allowed himself more artistic expression through Haddock's features than with Tintin's. Michael Farr, author of Tintin: The Complete Companion notes: "Whereas Hergé kept Tintin's facial expressions to a bare minimum ... Haddock's could be contorted with emotion." Farr goes on to write that "In Haddock, Hergé had come up with his most inspired character since creating Tintin" and sales of the volume in which Haddock was introduced indicated the character was well received. After a fairly serious role in The Shooting Star, where he is shown to have become the president of the Society of Sober Sailors, replete with a cabin full of whisky, Haddock takes a more central role in the next adventure, split over two books, The Secret of the Unicorn and Red Rackham's Treasure.

Hergé builds the adventure around Haddock, furnishing the character with an ancestral home, Marlinspike Hall, or "Moulinsart" in the original French. Harry Thompson, author of Tintin: Hergé and His Creation, writes that the introduction of this country mansion was "to provide a suitable ancestral home for Tintin and himself to move into." To achieve this in terms of the plot, Hergé also details Haddock's ancestry, something Thompson regards as distinctive: "Haddock is the only regular character whose relatives turn up in the Tintin stories at all (if one discounts Wagg)."

== Naming ==
Haddock's name was suggested by Hergé's wife, who noted over a fish dinner that haddock was a "sad English fish". Hergé then utilised the name for the English captain he had just introduced. Haddock remained without a first name until the last completed story, Tintin and the Picaros (1976), when the name Archibald was suggested. As Haddock's role grew, Hergé expanded his character, basing him upon aspects of friends, with his characteristic temper somewhat inspired by Tintin colourist E.P. Jacobs and his bluffness drawn from Bob de Moor. Harry Thompson has commented on how Hergé utilised the character to inject humour into the plot, notably "where Haddock plays the fool to smooth over a lengthy explanation".

Although it has not been suggested that Hergé based Haddock on any historical persons, several Haddocks have served in the navy. Many of the Haddocks of Leigh-on-Sea served in the British Royal Navy of the 17th century, with Admiral Sir Richard Haddock serving in the Battle of Sole Bay. Hergé may have drawn upon this family name and its naval tradition when naming his character.

Another famous merchant navy captain named Haddock was Herbert Haddock of Rugby, Warwickshire, skipper of RMS Olympic during the early 20th century.

== Expletives ==
At the time Captain Haddock was first introduced, just before the Second World War, his manners presented a moral problem to Hergé. As a sailor, Haddock ought to have very colourful language. However, Hergé had to balance that against the character's appearing in a Catholic children's magazine. The solution reportedly came when Hergé took advantage of a situation he had become embroiled in during 1933, shortly after the "Four Powers Act" had come into being. Hergé tried to intervene in a discussion between a shopkeeper and customer, but before he could the shopkeeper became so enraged that he lost his composure for a moment and accused his customer of being "a peace treaty". This was the solution Hergé sought: the captain would use strange or difficult words that were not offensive in themselves, but would hurl them out as if they were very strong swearwords.

The idea took form quickly and in his first anger-scene the captain storms towards a party of Bedouin raiders yelling expressions like "hydromeduse" (a form of jellyfish), "troglodyte" (cave dweller) and "ectoplasm". (The Bedouins immediately take flight, but from French Meharistes (North African desert police) appearing behind the captain's back.) The trick with the false swearwords proved successful and was a mainstay in future books. Consequently Hergé actively started collecting difficult or dirty-sounding words for use in the captain's next anger attacks and on occasion even searched dictionaries to come up with inspiration.

On one occasion however the scheme backfired. In one particularly angry state, Hergé had the captain yell the "swearword" pneumothorax (a medical emergency caused by the collapse of the lung within the chest, occasionally caused by the bends). One week after the scene appeared in Tintin Magazine, Hergé received a letter allegedly from a father whose boy was a great fan of Tintin and also a heavy tuberculosis sufferer who had experienced a collapsed lung. According to the letter, the boy was devastated that his favourite comic made fun of his own condition. Afterwards it turned out that the letter was a fake written and planted by Hergé's friend and collaborator Jacques Van Melkebeke.

The most famous of Haddock's expressions is any of a number of permutations of "Billions of blue blistering barnacles!" (mille millions de mille milliards de mille sabords!). Another famous one is any of a number of permutations of "Ten thousand thundering typhoons!" (Tonnerre de Brest!)
