= The Seven Crystal Balls =

Comic album by Belgian cartoonist Hergé

The Seven Crystal Balls (Les 7 Boules de Cristal)
- Cover of the English edition
- Date: 1948
- Series: The Adventures of Tintin
- Publisher: Casterman

Creative team
- Creator: Hergé

Original publication
- Published in: Le Soir, then; Tintin magazine
- Date of publication: 16 December 1943 – 2 September 1944, then; 26 September 1946 – 22 April 1948
- Language: French

Translation
- Publisher: Methuen
- Date: 1962
- Translator: Leslie Lonsdale-Cooper; Michael Turner

Chronology
- Preceded by: Red Rackham's Treasure (1944)
- Followed by: Prisoners of the Sun (1949)

The Seven Crystal Balls (French: Les 7 Boules de cristal) is the thirteenth volume of The Adventures of Tintin, the comics series by Belgian cartoonist Hergé. The story was serialised daily in Le Soir, Belgium's leading francophone newspaper, from December 1943 amidst the German occupation of Belgium during World War II. The story was cancelled abruptly following the Allied liberation in September 1944, when Hergé was blacklisted after being accused of collaborating with the occupying Germans. After he was cleared two years later, the story and its follow-up Prisoners of the Sun were then serialised weekly in the new Tintin magazine from September 1946 to April 1948. The story revolves around the investigations of a young reporter Tintin and his friend Captain Haddock into the abduction of their friend Professor Calculus and its connection to a mysterious illness which has afflicted the members of an archaeological expedition to Peru.

The Seven Crystal Balls was a commercial success and was published in book form by Casterman shortly after its conclusion, while the series itself became a defining part of the Franco-Belgian comics tradition. Critics have ranked The Seven Crystal Balls as one of the best Adventures of Tintin, describing it as the most frightening installment in the series. The story was adapted for the 1969 Belvision film Tintin and the Temple of the Sun, the 1991 Ellipse/Nelvana animated series The Adventures of Tintin, the 1992–3 BBC Radio 5 dramatisation of the Adventures, the 1997 video game Prisoners of the Sun, and a 2001 musical in Dutch and French versions.

== Synopsis ==
Young reporter Tintin and his dog Snowy, meet with their old friend Captain Haddock at his country estate. The naturally humble Haddock is attempting to fit the role at his newfound family château, becoming a socialite and dressing formally. The three spend an evening at a music hall, where they witness the performance of a clairvoyant, Madame Yamilah, who predicts the illness of one of the Sanders-Hardiman expedition members; this expedition has recently returned from an archaeological venture to the Andes mountains. The evening's entertainment also includes the act of a knife thrower whom Tintin recognises as General Alcazar, former President of San Theodoros. Having befriended Alcazar during one of his previous adventures, Tintin reunites with him backstage after the show. Alcazar introduces Tintin and Haddock to his Quechua assistant, Chiquito, and explains that he is in exile after being deposed (once again) by his rival, General Tapioca.

The next day, Tintin and Haddock learn that members of the Sanders-Hardiman expedition are falling into comas, with fragments of a shattered crystal ball found near each victim. Tintin, Haddock, and their friend Professor Calculus visit the only expedition member yet to be affected, Professor Hercules Tarragon, who is an old friend and former classmate of Calculus'. Under police guard, Professor Tarragon shows his visitors one of the expedition's discoveries from Peru: the mummified body of Inca king Rascar Capac. That evening, a lightning storm strikes the house and sends ball lightning down the chimney and onto the mummy—which evaporates. Worried, Tarragon states that this reflects the culmination of Capac's prophecy, which declares that punishment will descend upon those who desecrate his tomb. Spending the stormy night at Tarragon's house, Tintin, Haddock, and Calculus are each awoken by a nightmare involving Capac's mummy throwing a crystal ball to the floor. They find Tarragon comatose in his bed, with the accompanying crystal shards nearby; the attacker had bypassed the guards by climbing in via the chimney. The next day while Tarragon is being examined by a doctor, Calculus is walking on the grounds of Tarragon's house when he discovers one of the mummy's bracelets, which he places on himself.

Tintin and Haddock later realise that Calculus has gone missing, and surmise that he has been kidnapped by the same individual who placed Tarragon in a coma. The police set up road blocks, but the kidnappers switch cars and are able to evade them. Tintin visits a hospital where the seven stricken members of the Sanders-Hardiman expedition are housed; he is astonished that at a precise time of day, all awaken and scream about figures attacking them before slipping back into their comas. Haddock is dejected by Calculus' abduction, but upon learning that police have spotted the kidnapper's car at a port, he and Tintin race there to Westermouth, believing that the abductors seek to board a boat with Calculus and take him abroad. At the docks, they spot Alcazar boarding a ship to South America; he reveals that Chiquito was one of the last descendants of the Inca and has disappeared. Tintin surmises that Chiquito must be one of Calculus' captors.

Having lost Calculus' trail, Tintin and Haddock decide to pay a visit to Haddock's old friend Chester, who has docked at another nearby port. They miss Chester, but instead discover Calculus' hat on the docks, indicating that he was taken to sea from here. Investigating, they realise that Calculus must be aboard the Pachacamac, a ship headed to Peru, and board a flight, intent on intercepting its arrival.

== History ==
=== Background ===
The Seven Crystal Balls began serialization amidst the German occupation of Belgium during World War II. Hergé had accepted a position working for Le Soir, Belgium's largest Francophone daily newspaper. Confiscated from its original owners, Le Soir was permitted by the German authorities to reopen under the directorship of Belgian editor Raymond de Becker, although it remained firmly under Nazi control, supporting the German war effort and espousing anti-Semitism. Joining Le Soir on 15 October 1940, Hergé was aided by old friend Paul Jamin and the cartoonist Jacques Van Melkebeke. Some Belgians were upset that Hergé was willing to work for a newspaper controlled by the occupying Nazi administration, although he was heavily enticed by the size of Le Soir's readership, which reached 600,000. Faced with the reality of Nazi oversight, Hergé abandoned the overt political themes that had pervaded much of his earlier work, instead adopting a policy of neutrality. Without the need to satirise political types, entertainment producer and author Harry Thompson observed that "Hergé was now concentrating more on plot and on developing a new style of character comedy. The public reacted positively".

Following the culmination of his previous The Adventures of Tintin story Red Rackham's Treasure, Hergé had agreed to a proposal that would allow the newspaper to include a detective story revolving around his characters, Thomson and Thompson. Titled Dupont et Dupond, détectives ("Thomson and Thompson, Detectives"), Hergé provided the illustrations, and the story was authored by Le Soir crime writer Paul Kinnet. While this was being serialised, Hergé began contemplating ideas for his new Tintin adventure, toying with the idea of a story surrounding a dangerous invention that Calculus had developed. The story was probably inspired by an article authored by Le Soir's science correspondent, Bernard Heuvelmans, and while Hergé did not use this idea at the time, he revived it a decade later as the basis for The Calculus Affair.

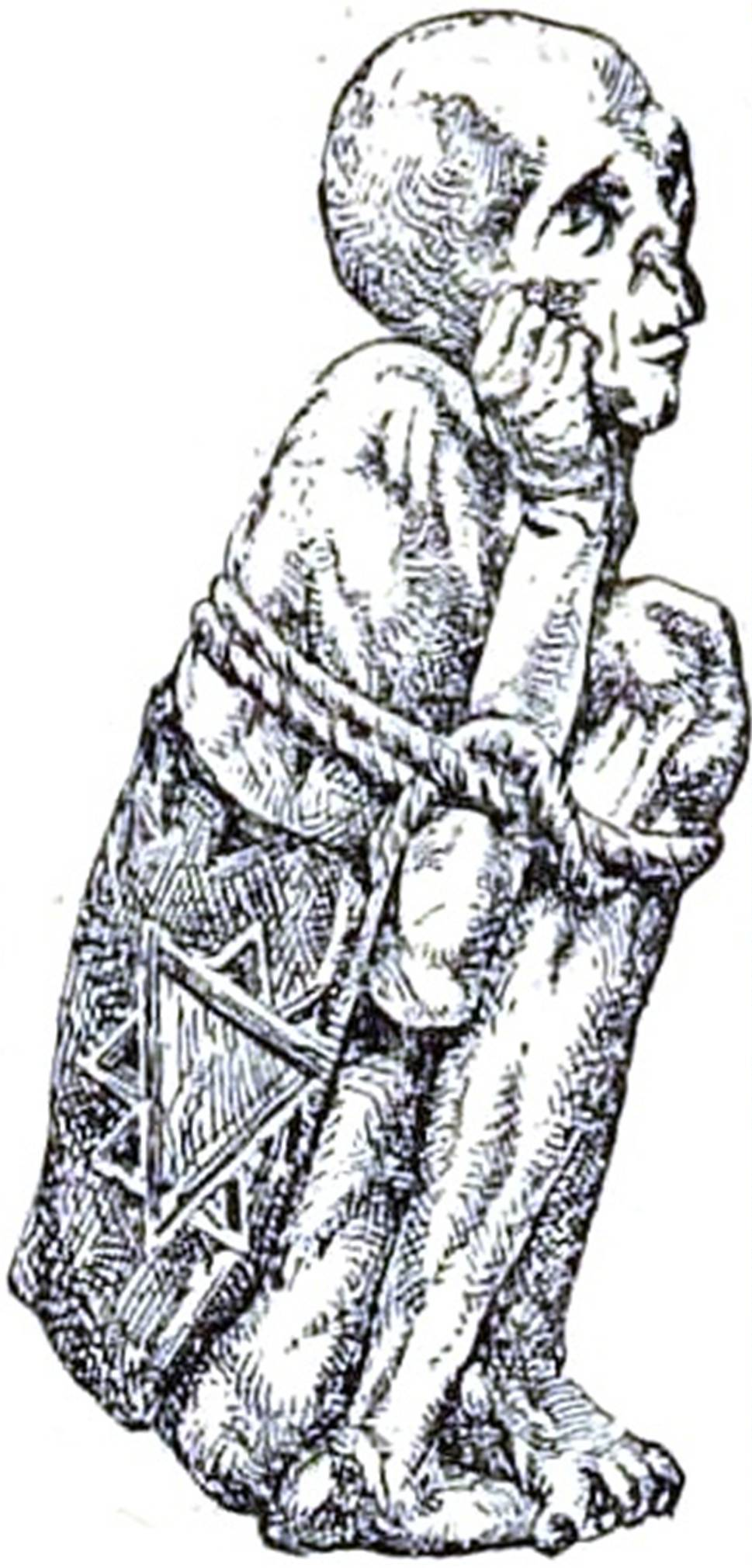
Mummy in the Larousse encyclopaedia, the inspiration for Rascar Capac

As with Hergé's two previous stories, The Secret of the Unicorn and Red Rackham's Treasure, The Seven Crystal Balls was designed as part of a twofold story arc, to be concluded with the then yet unnamed Prisoners of the Sun. Hergé planned for the former story to outline a mystery, while the latter would see his characters undertake an expedition to solve it. His use of an ancient mummy's curse around which the narrative revolved was inspired by tales of a curse of the pharaohs which had been unearthed during the archaeologist Howard Carter's 1922 discovery of Pharaoh Tutankhamun's tomb. This was not the first time that Hergé had been inspired by this tabloid story, having previously drawn from it when authoring Cigars of the Pharaoh.

In autumn 1943, Hergé decided that he wanted Edgar P. Jacobs, a fellow cartoonist, to collaborate with him on The Adventures of Tintin. Although initially hesitant, Jacobs eventually agreed, adopting the paid position in January 1944. The two became close friends and artistic collaborators, as Jacobs aided Hergé in developing various aspects of the plot, such as the idea of the crystal balls and the story's title. Although stylistically the two men were different both in forms of illustration and narrative, they influenced each other greatly. Hergé used Jacobs as a life model from whom he drew various poses that characters adopt in the story. He also used Jacobs as a researcher, sending him to the Cinquantenaire Museum to study its collections of Incan material. Like Jacobs in "The U-Ray", he used as a basis for the creation of Rascar Capac the drawing of a Chachapoya mummy from the Larousse encyclopaedia and not, as was widely believed, a mummy from the Cinquantenaire Museum.

The museum's director, Professor Capart, exhibited similarities with Professor Tarragon, a new character that Hergé had developed for the story. Hergé also included a number of characters who had previously appeared in earlier adventures, among them Professor Cantonneau from The Shooting Star, General Alcazar from The Broken Ear, and Bianca Castafiore from King Ottokar's Sceptre.

The scenery and background of the story was meticulously copied from existing sources; car model types like the Opel Olympia 38 in which Calculus' abductors escaped the police were drawn from real examples, while Hergé closely adhered to the reality of the port and docks at Saint-Nazaire. Professor Tarragon's house was drawn from a real house in Avenue Delleur, Boitsfort, which Jacobs had identified for Hergé's purposes. Hergé and Jacobs stationed themselves outside the house and completed a sketch of the building. Immediately after, two grey cars containing German soldiers pulled up; the house had been requisitioned by the Schutzstaffel (SS). Hergé realised that, had he and Jacobs been discovered sketching, they would have been interrogated.

=== Publication ===
The story began serialisation in Le Soir under the title of Les Sept Boules de Cristal on 16 December 1943. However, Hergé's health declined, as he was afflicted with flu, sinusitis, and ear ache. This was accompanied by general exhaustion, depression, and fear that upon the imminent collapse of German administration, he would face retribution as a collaborator; many accused of being collaborators had already been killed by the Belgian Resistance. Experiencing a breakdown, he took a hiatus from producing The Seven Crystal Balls between 6 May and 6 July 1944, during which a message was posted in Le Soir stating:

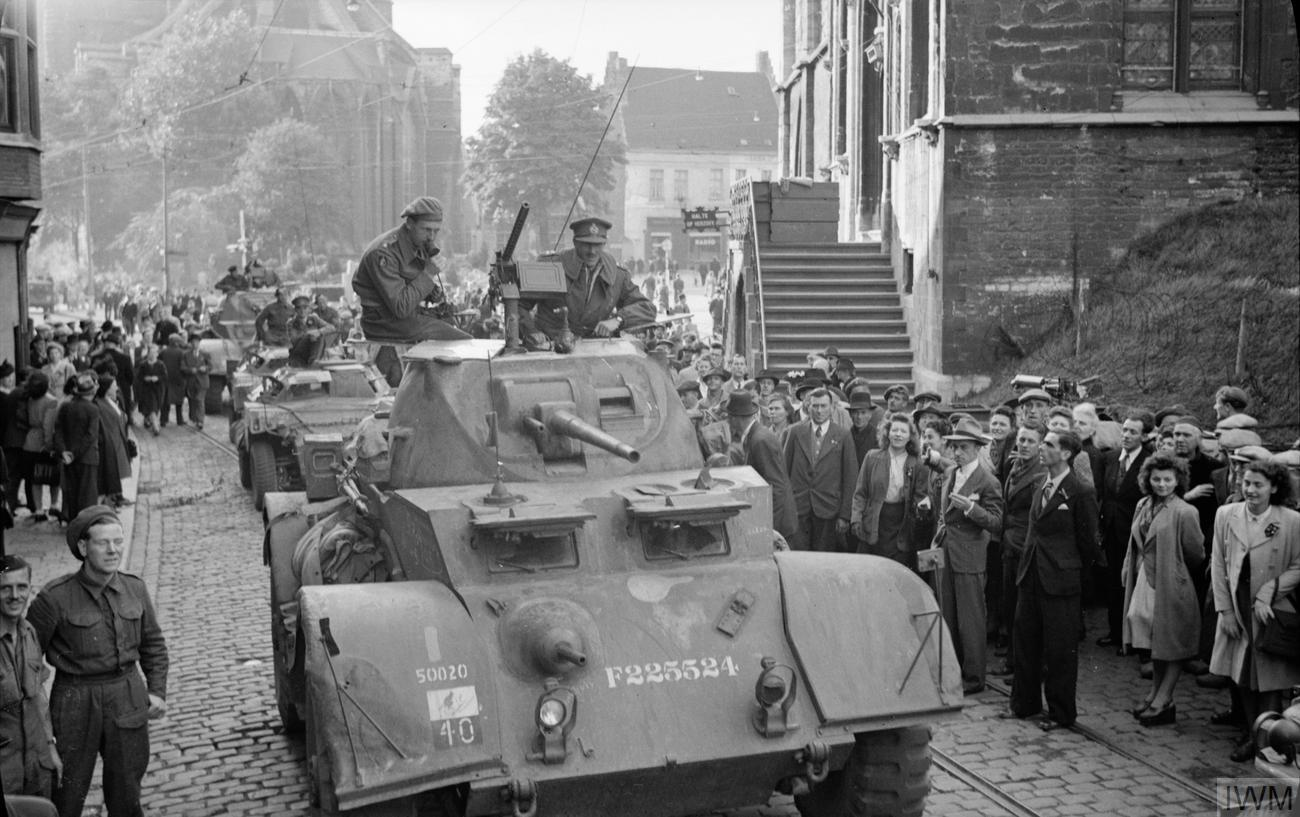
The Allied liberation of Belgium in September 1944 halted the serialised adventure

They're coming! Who? Why, Tintin and Snowy, of course! Perhaps, since you have not heard anything about them lately, you have been afraid, dear readers, that something bad had happened to them? Nothing of the sort! Tintin and Snowy were simply waiting for our excellent associate and friend Hergé to return to better health, as he was sick for a few weeks.

The story returned to its serialisation in Le Soir on 7 July, starting with a summary of the story so far. However, it would be interrupted again on 2 September 1944. Brussels was liberated from German occupation by the Allied forces on 3 September, upon which Le Soir immediately ceased publication. Hergé had been forced to abandon the story after 152 strips, equivalent to fifty pages of the later published book volume. The story had been left unfinished after the scene in which Tintin leaves the hospital where he sees the seven members of the expedition enduring a simultaneous fit. (Note: Following this scene in which Tintin leaves the hospital, Hergé had then published a scene in Le Soir in which Tintin, while absorbed by a newspaper article, literally bumps into General Alcazar on the street and is informed that Chiquito has disappeared, which was the final panel before Le Soir was shut down. This scene with Tintin and Alcazar on the street was essentially cut and done in a different way when the story picked up again two years later and when it was published in book form.) Three days later the entire staff were fired and a new editorial team introduced.

Hergé was arrested on 3 September, having been named as a collaborator in a Resistance document known as the "Gallery of Traitors". This would be the first of four incidents in which Hergé was arrested and freed: by the State Security, the Judiciary Police, the Belgian National Movement, and the Front for Independence, during which he spent one night in jail. On 8 September the Supreme Headquarters Allied Expeditionary Force issued a proclamation announcing that "any journalist who had helped produce a newspaper during the occupation was for the time being barred from practising his profession". Blacklisted, Hergé was now unemployed. A newspaper closely associated with the Belgian Resistance, La Patrie, issued a strip titled The Adventures of Tintin in the Land of the Nazis, in which Hergé was lampooned as a collaborator.

"[During the occupation] I worked, just like a miner, a tram driver, or baker! But, while one found it normal for an engineer to operate a train, members of the press were labelled as 'traitors'".

— Hergé

The period witnessed widespread allegations against accused collaborators, with military courts condemning 30,000 on minor charges and 25,000 on more serious charges; of those, 5,500 were sentenced to life imprisonment or capital punishment. A judiciary inquiry into Hergé's case was launched by the deputy public prosecutor, Mr Vinçotte, although in his report he urged lenience, stating that "I am inclined to close the case. I believe it would bring ridicule on the judicial system to go after an inoffensive children's book author and illustrator. On the other hand, Hergé worked for Le Soir during the war, and his illustrations are what made people buy the newspaper". Unable to work for the press, Hergé worked from home re-drawing, and Jacobs colouring, the older Adventures of Tintin for publication by his book publisher Casterman, completing the second version of Tintin in the Congo and starting on King Ottokar's Sceptre. Casterman supported Hergé throughout his ordeal, for which he always remained grateful. He and Jacobs produced a comic strip under the pseudonym of "Olav", although no publishers accepted it. Although this period allowed him an escape from the pressure of daily production which had affected most of his working life, he also had family problems to deal with; his brother Paul returned to Brussels from a German prisoner-of-war camp and their mother had become highly delusional and was moved to a psychiatric hospital.

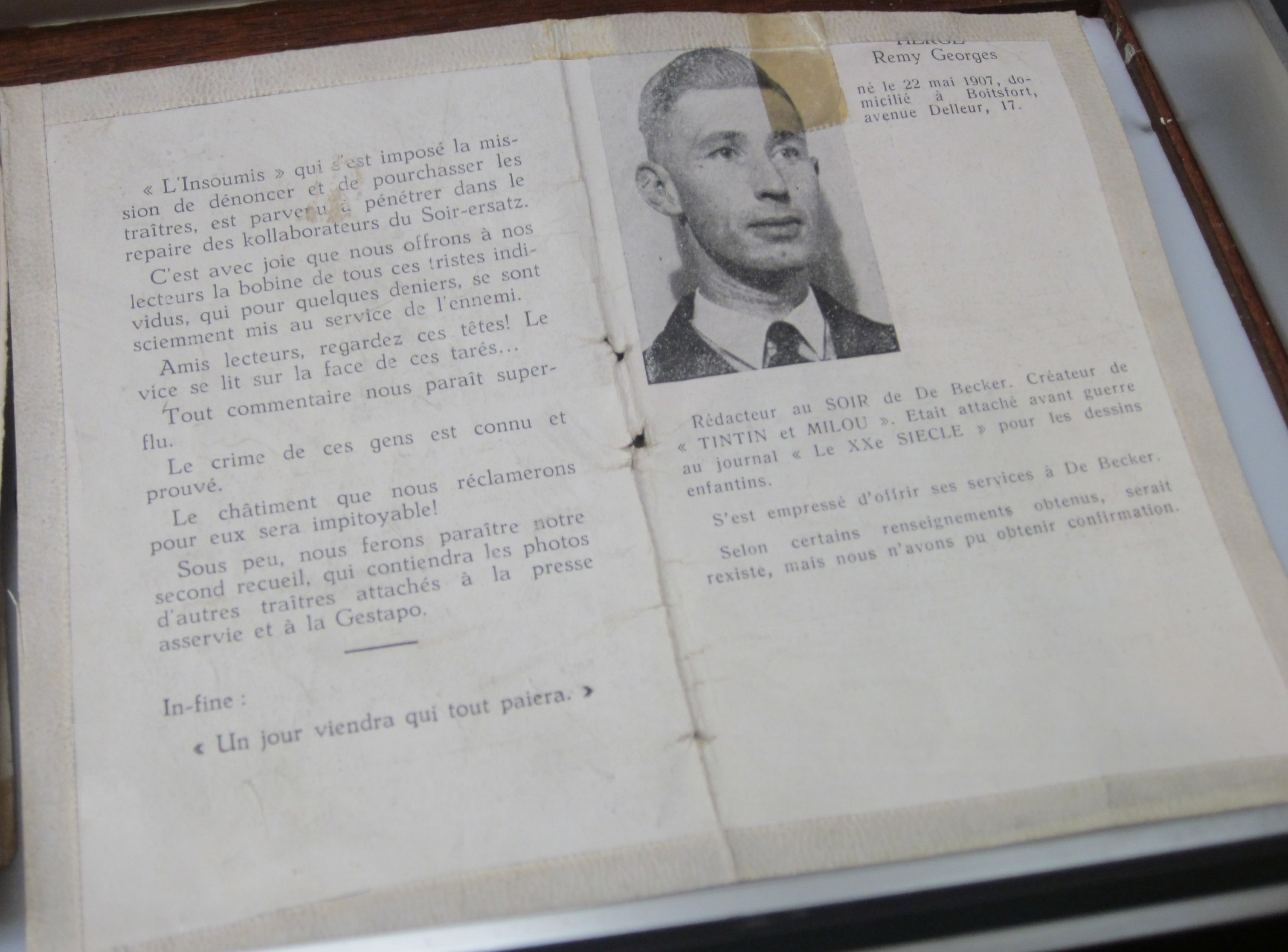
Booklet published by the Belgian Resistance group L'Insoumis, denouncing Georges Remy [sic] as a collaborator. Hergé later admitted that "I hated the Resistance thing ... I knew that for every one of the Resistance's actions, hostages would be arrested and shot".

In October 1945, Hergé was approached by Raymond Leblanc, a former member of a conservative Resistance group, the National Royalist Movement (MNR), and his associates André Sinave and Albert Debaty. The trio were planning on launching a weekly magazine for children. Leblanc, who had fond childhood memories of Tintin in the Land of the Soviets, thought Hergé would be ideal for it. Hergé agreed, and Leblanc obtained clearance papers for him, allowing him to work. Concerned about the judicial investigation into Hergé's wartime affiliations, Leblanc convinced William Ugeux, a leader of the Belgian Resistance who was now in charge of censorship and certificates of good citizenship, to look into the comic creator's file. Ugeux concluded that Hergé had been "a blunderer rather than a traitor" for his work at Le Soir. The decision whether Hergé would stand trial belonged to the general auditor of the Military Tribunal, Walter Ganshof van der Meersch. He closed the case on 22 December, declaring that "in regard to the particularly inoffensive character of the drawings published by Remi, bringing him before a war tribunal would be inappropriate and risky".

Now free from threat of prosecution, he continued to support his colleagues at Le Soir who were being charged as collaborators; six of them were sentenced to death, and others to lengthy prison sentences. Among those sentenced to death was Hergé's friend, Paul Jamin, although his sentence was commuted to life imprisonment. (Note: Jamin was released from prison in the early 1950s.) In May 1946, Hergé was issued a certificate of good citizenship, which became largely necessary to obtain employment in post-war Belgium. Celebrations were marred by his mother's death at age 60 in April 1946. Harry Thompson has described this post-war period as the "greatest upheaval" of Hergé's life. Hergé later described it as "an experience of absolute intolerance. It was horrible, horrible!" He considered the post-war trials of collaborators a great injustice inflicted upon many innocent people, and never forgave Belgian society for the way that he had been treated, although he hid this from his public persona.

Leblanc's new magazine was titled Tintin at the advice of Sinave, who believed that this would help attract a wide audience. Adopting the slogan of "The Newspaper for the Young Aged 7 to 77", the magazine's logo featured the Tintin character himself. Inspired by the example set by Le Petit Vingtième, Tintin magazine was to be a weekly, centred on the eponymous hero. The Adventures of Tintin would be serialised two pages per week, accompanied by other Franco-Belgian comics. For the first time, the Adventures would be in colour from the outset. Hergé assembled a team of artists for the purpose, including Edgar P. Jacobs and Jacques Van Melkebeke, who became the magazine's first editor. Hergé continued at the point where he had left The Seven Crystal Balls, prior to embarking on Prisoners of the Sun, although both were published under the title of Le Temple du Soleil (The Temple of the Sun). Rather than re-serialising the story from its beginning, he began the new magazine with a summary of the story so far, presented as a press clipping. (Note: Readers who had gone without The Adventures of Tintin for two years were reunited with the story of The Seven Crystal Balls in the new Tintin magazine with a symbolic image of Tintin returning to Marlinspike Hall (page 50 in the book). Farr suggested that the image of Captain Haddock dejectedly waiting by the telephone, followed by his triumphant return to adventuring, was Hergé's symbolic depiction of himself at the end of his two-year hiatus. These scenes were soon followed by the redone scene with Tintin and General Alcazar.) The magazine was an instant success, soon gaining a weekly circulation of 100,000 in Belgium and the Netherlands. Serialisation of The Seven Crystal Balls concluded on 22 April 1948, four and a half years after it had begun.

=== Republication ===
As with the previous adventures, it then began serialisation in the French Catholic newspaper Cœurs Vaillants, from 19 May 1946. After the story had finished serialisation, the publishing company Casterman divided it into two volumes, Les Sept Boules de Cristal and Le Temple du Soleil, which they released in 1948 and 1949 respectively. One of the scenes that had been found in Le Soir, in which Haddock is humiliated by the clairvoyant at the theatre, was removed from the story when it was being reformatted in book form. The book contained additional backgrounds not found in the original serialised story which had been drawn by Jacobs.

When translated into English for a publication by Methuen in 1963, a number of Francophone place-names were changed; for instance, the port of Saint-Nazaire was renamed Westermouth, which, according to author Michael Farr, was probably inspired by the real English coastal town of Weymouth. As the English-language translation was published after the English translation of other Tintin adventures, which had actually been authored later than The Seven Crystal Balls, in the English version, references are made to events that would occur in The Calculus Affair and The Red Sea Sharks.

== Critical analysis ==
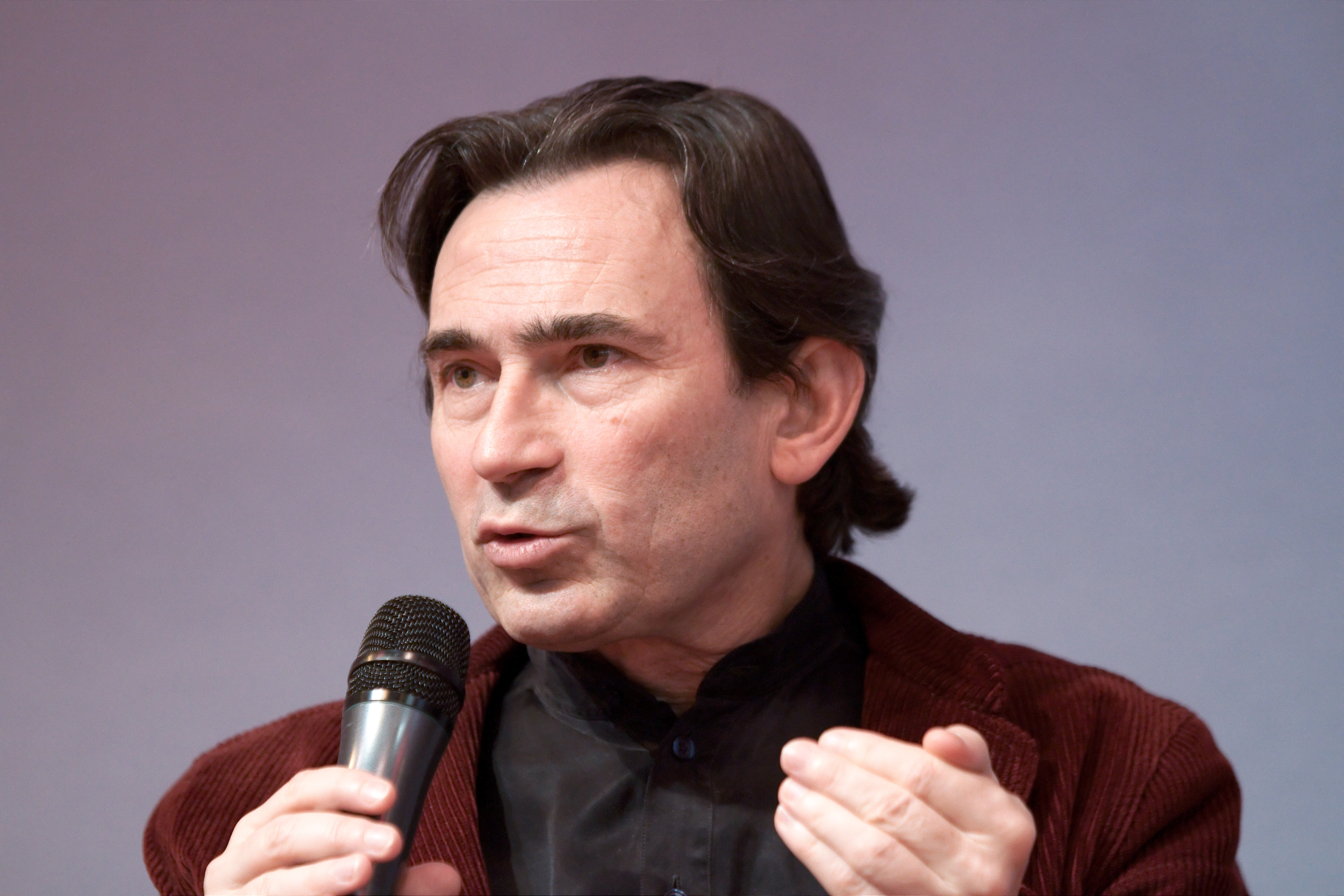
Peeters thought The Seven Crystal Balls to be "the most terrifying" of the series.

Biographer Benoît Peeters described The Seven Crystal Balls as "the most terrifying of The Adventures of Tintin". He believed that in this story, Hergé had come under the clear influence of Jacobs, in that the "décor grows more lush; the details clearer. No more streets suggested by a few lines, monochromatic posters, or characters walking on the edge of the frame". Elsewhere, he noted that in this story, Hergé "produced a gripping tale that went further than any other in the direction of the supernatural". Fellow biographer Pierre Assouline believed that The Seven Crystal Balls achieved "a more complete integration of narrative and illustrations" than previous adventures, and that from that point on, his books "begin to form a coherent body of work, an oeuvre".

Harry Thompson stated that the "overriding theme" of The Seven Crystal Balls was "fear of the unknown", adding that while it did blend humour with menace, it remained "Hergé's most frightening book". He noted that the story marks the complete transition of Captain Haddock from the "pitiable drunk" which he was introduced as in The Crab with the Golden Claws to the position of "chief sidekick and comic attraction", with Snowy being relegated to the position of "normal dog".

Michael Farr described both The Seven Crystal Balls and Prisoners of the Sun as "classic middle-period Tintin", commenting on their "surprisingly well-balanced narrative" and noting that they exhibited scant evidence of Hergé's turbulent personal life. He felt that The Seven Crystal Balls encapsulated the "air of doom" which pervaded the mood of Europe at the time to an even greater extent than Hergé had done in his earlier work, The Shooting Star. At the same time, Farr thought it to be "a simple detective story", comparing Tintin's hunt for clues regarding Calculus' disappearance to Arthur Conan Doyle's stories of fictional detective Sherlock Holmes. He thought that the story was "truly Hitchcockian in its suspense and quite cinematic in its presentation", comparing the use of the music hall in the story with its use in Hitchcock's film, The 39 Steps (1935). Farr suggested that in the scene in which Haddock dejectedly sits around Marlinspike awaiting news of Calculus, "Hergé had allowed himself to step for a moment into Haddock's shoes and to be autobiographical".

Jean-Marc Lofficier and Randy Lofficier believed that the two-story arc represents "one more leap forward in Hergé's graphic and narrative skills" as a result of the transition to full colour double pages as the initial means of publication. They noted that The Seven Crystal Balls is "bathed in the surreal atmosphere that Hergé knew how to create so well", with Tintin confronting "a dark and oppressive force" that was "worthy of a Hammer film". They particularly praised the characters of Professor Tarragon and Mark Falconer (Marc Chalet), describing the former as "to archaeology what Haddock is to the sea", and that the latter resembled an older Tintin with darker hair, noting that "one regrets that their appearances are all too brief, and wonders what the adventures of Falconer and Tarragon would be like". Ultimately, the Lofficiers awarded both halves of the story arc five out of five.

Literary critic Tom McCarthy also praised Tarragon, stating that he exudes a presence "far beyond what we might expect from a novelist, let alone a cartoonist". He then compared the scenario in which Tarragon was trapped within his home to that in The Calculus Affair in which Professor Topolino was tied up in his house. He also identified elements within the story that he believed reflected recurring themes within The Adventures of Tintin. He argued that the way in which Alcazar was presented as Tintin's friend in this story was a manifestation of the recurring theme of friendship. He thought that the appearance of Rascar Capac's jewels reflected Hergé's use of jewels as a theme throughout the series, while the mummy's removal from its tomb was a manifestation of the recurring concept of the tomb.

In his psychoanalytical study of the Adventures of Tintin, the academic Jean-Marie Apostolidès believed that The Seven Crystal Balls-Prisoners of the Sun arc reflects a confrontation between civilisations, and between the sacred and the secular. He also discussed Haddock's position in the story, noting that the scene at the theatre in which a bull's head mask falls onto Haddock's head reflects "one of Hergé's most constant themes: the union of human and animal". He further added the opinion that Haddock's transformation from seaman to country gentleman was not believable. He suggested that the appearance of Yamila and Castafiore at the start of the story injected "a feminine element" into the story, which represented an attempt to "round out Haddock's family", which was dominated by the male figures of Tintin, Calculus, and Snowy. He further argued that Calculus' kidnapping represented a "rite of passage" that would allow him to join Tintin and Haddock's family.

== Adaptations ==
In 1969, the animation company Belvision Studios, which had produced the 1956–57 television series Hergé's Adventures of Tintin, released its first feature-length animated film, Tintin and the Temple of the Sun, adapted from the Seven Crystal Balls-Prisoners of the Sun story arc. Produced by Raymond Leblanc and directed by Eddie Lateste, it was written by Lateste, the cartoonist Greg, Jos Marissen, and Laszló Molnár. Music was by François Rauber and Zorrino's song was composed by Jacques Brel. Lofficier and Lofficier commented that the part of the film based on The Seven Crystal Balls "suffers from being overly condensed for timing reasons".

In 1991, a second animated series based upon The Adventures of Tintin was produced, this time as a collaboration between the French studio Ellipse and the Canadian animation company Nelvana. The Seven Crystal Balls was the eleventh story to be adapted and was divided into two thirty-minute episodes. Directed by Stéphane Bernasconi, the series has been praised for being "generally faithful" to the original comics, to the extent that the animation was directly adopted from Hergé's original panels.

The video game Prisoners of the Sun was developed and published by the French company Infogrames in 1997, based on The Seven Crystal Balls and Prisoners of the Sun.

At the turn of the new century, Tintin remained popular. In 2001, The Seven Crystal Balls and Prisoners of the Sun were adapted into a theatrical musical, Kuifje – De Zonnetempel (Tintin – The Temple of the Sun), which premiered at the Stadsschouwburg in Antwerp in the Dutch language on 15 September. The production, directed by Dirk de Caluwé, adapted by Seth Gaaikema and Frank Van Laecke with music by Dirk Brossé, featured Tom Van Landuyt as Tintin. The musical was adapted by Didier Van Cauwelaert into French and premiered a year later in Charleroi as Tintin – Le Temple du Soleil. From there, the production was scheduled for Paris in 2003 but was cancelled. It returned for a brief run in Antwerp on 18 October 2007.
