= Tintin – Le Temple du Soleil – Le Spectacle Musical =

2001 Belgian musical

Tintin – Le Temple du Soleil Le Spectacle Musical
- Original Cast Recording
- Music: Dirk Brossé
- Lyrics: Seth Gaaikema; Frank van Laecke
- Book: Seth Gaaikema; Frank van Laecke; Didier van Cauwelaert
- Basis: The Adventures of Tintin comics The Seven Crystal Balls and Prisoners of the Sun by Hergé
- Productions: 2002 Charleroi

Tintin – Le Temple du Soleil, subtitled Le Spectacle Musical, is a 2002 Belgian musical in two acts with music by Dirk Brossé, lyrics and scenario by Seth Gaaikema and Frank van Laecke and adapted to French by Didier Van Cauwelaert, based on two of The Adventures of Tintin by Hergé: The Seven Crystal Balls (1948) and Prisoners of the Sun (1949). It is the French-language version of the Dutch show Kuifje – De Zonnetempel that premiered in 2001. It premièred in Charleroi in 2002 and was scheduled for Paris in 2003 but was cancelled.

== Synopsis ==
=== Act 1 ===
An expedition of seven scientists, the Sanders-Hardiman expedition, discovers the tomb of the Incan mummy Rascar Capac and provokes the anger of the Sun God. A curse descends upon them. Meanwhile, Tintin and Snowy arrive on the train at Marlinspike, and Tintin talks to another traveller about the recent return of the expedition from Peru. He says that all will end badly, desecrating the burial chambers of the Incas like Tutankhamen's – five members of the expedition have already been mysteriously struck down.

Tintin and Snowy go to Marlinspike Hall where Captain Haddock lives, and they meet Nestor the butler. He says that Haddock is currently horse riding, but he shortly returns minus the horse. Haddock introduces their old friend Professor Calculus, and then tries to show Tintin a magic trick to turn water into whisky, which fails. Angry at not being able to do it, he takes Tintin to the music hall to see Bruno the magician perform the trick.

That evening at the music hall, Tintin and Haddock watch a performance by the opera singer Bianca Castafiore, which Snowy turns into an impromptu duet. Haddock storms out from the show because of Castafiore's singing. Ragdalam the fakir and Yamilah the clairvoyant perform after Castafiore; after a few novelty predictions, Ragdalam asks Yamilah to tell him about a woman in the audience, Mrs Clarkson. She says that her husband, Clarkson, is a photographer, and that he has been struck down by the curse of Rascar Capac. Mrs Clarkson must leave the show with her daughter, Fleur, when she receives a message that her husband is indeed ill. The magician's act is on, and Haddock stumbles onto the stage with a stage prop of a cow's head on his, after having got lost backstage trying to find his way out.

Tintin, Haddock, and Calculus go to the home of Professor Hercules Tarragon to protect him, as he and Calculus were students together. The police detectives Thomson and Thompson have also been sent to protect Tarragon. Tarragon reveals the mummy of Rascar Capac, and Tintin reads the prophecy that the expedition found in his tomb. A storm comes, a ball of lightning comes down the chimney, destroys the mummy, and Bergamotte realises that the prophecy is true. He is then struck down by the curse like the others.

At the hospital, Fleur and her mother sit by the bed of Clarkson. Tintin arrives following Bergamotte's attack, and Fleur asks him to help her father. Tintin says he will, and leaves the hospital, whilst Fleur reassures her mother that everything will be alright because Tintin will help them. In the garden, Calculus mysteriously disappears following his donning the bracelet.

Later at Marlinspike, Haddock is depressed because of Calculus's disappearance. Castafiore, her accompanist Igor Wagner, and her maid Irma arrive; Castafiore announcing she will be staying for a period. Tintin, Haddock and Snowy manage to escape and head to the docks, where they discover that Calculus has been spotted on the ship «Pachacamac» and is going to Peru. They catch a flying boat to Peru, and as it flies into the distance, the curtain closes on Act One.

=== Act 2 ===
In Peru, Tintin and Haddock ask whether anyone has seen Calculus, but are met with "No sé" ("I don't know") from everyone. Tintin and Snowy intervene to stop two men bullying a child. The child, Zorrino, reveals that he is an orphan living on the streets. Tintin cheers him up by making him a little boat out of newspaper. Zorrino reveals that he knows where Calculus is – he has been taken to the Temple of the Sun. Zorrino leads them on a trek to the temple, with many perils against them. Snowy is taken by a condor, and Tintin climbs to the top of a cliff to look for him. He is attacked by the condor and, hanging onto its legs, is carried to the ground where he discovers Snowy.

Meanwhile, Thomson and Thompson have found Calculus's pendulum and attempt to use it to locate him. They mistake the indications given by the pendulum, and travel to the North Pole and meet an eskimo, to the Far East, and to Scotland. Eventually they realise that the pendulum is pointing to Peru, where Tintin and Haddock are, and head off in pursuit.

Tintin, Haddock and Zorrino reach a waterfall. Zorrino and Haddock cross without incident, but as Tintin crosses, with Snowy in his rucksack, the rope snaps and they fall through the waterfall. He survives the fall and Haddock and Zorrino join him on the other side of the waterfall, in a cavern. At the same time, an Incan ceremony is taking place. Suddenly, Tintin, Snowy, Haddock and Zorrino crash through a hidden door in the wall.

They are blindfolded, and the Grand Inca declares that their punishment for profaning the temple is to die at the stake, but grants them one last wish: they are allowed to choose the day and hour of their deaths. Zorrino is separated from the others as they are imprisoned, visits them in their cell, and unfolds the little boat that Tintin had made for him. Tintin reads the newspaper and finds their salvation. He tells the Incan guard that they wish to die in eighteen days' time. When the day comes, they are bound to the stake on the funeral pyre whilst a ceremony takes place. Thomson and Thompson arrive, having finally found Calculus; they are also tied up. As they are about to be sacrificed, Tintin "commands" the Sun; everything goes dark as the Moon moves in front of the Sun's face. Tintin reveals to a startled Haddock what he read in the newspaper: the impending solar eclipse!

The Grand Inca begs Tintin to make the Sun show its light again, and he does so. The Inca sets them free, as they have the favour of the Sun. Tintin asks for the curse of Rascar Capac to be lifted, and in Europe, the expedition members awake, to the delight of Mrs Clarkson and Fleur, who thank Tintin. Back in Peru, the Grand Inca adopts Zorrino, and as everyone comes home in Brussels together, the cast takes their bows. The curtain falls.

== Scenes and songs ==
Charleroi Cast

Act 1

- La grotte de l'Inca, Pérou – Rascar Capac
- La gare – Tintin et Milou
- Le château de Moulinsart – Rien dans les manches
- Théâtre du variété palace – Ah, je ris (duo pour diva et chien); L'hypnose; Rien dans les manches (reprise); Les 7 boules de cristal
- La bibliothèque du professeur Bergamotte – La valse des professeurs; Contrôle total
- La clinique – Contaminées; Tintin, aide nous
- Le jardin du professeur Bergamotte – Soleil; Promenade avec Tournesol
- Le château de Moulinsart – Le rossignol milanais; Tonnerre de Brest
- Le port – Tonnerre de Brest (reprise)

Act 2

- Le marché de Callao, Pérou – No sé; Contrôle total (reprise); L'empire des riches
- La loge d'opéra de Bianca / Le voyage – La vie est un opéra; Milou et moi
- La cabine téléphonique – Le pendule
- La loge d'opéra de Bianca / La jungle – Feu de joie
- La chute d'eau
- Le Temple du Soleil – Rascar Capac (reprise); Le Temple du Soleil; Prière de Zorrino
- La prison – Adieu au whisky; Le bateau-journal
- Le bûcher – Le bûcher; Soleil (Finale)

Paris Cast

Act 1

- Rascar Capac
- Tintin et Milou
- Ah, je ris
- Contrôle total
- La victoire du coeur
- Le soleil (solo)
- Mille millions de mille sabords

Act 2

- No sé
- L'empire des riches
- Milou et moi
- Feu de joie
- Adieu au whisky
- Soleil (final)

== Music ==
The show boasts an orchestral score composed by Dirk Brossé with lyrics by Seth Gaaikema (adapted to French by Didier Van Cauwelaert and performed by l'Orchestre National de Belgique (the Belgian National Orchestra). There are around twenty different songs in the show, and a few reprises. The two main themes that run throughout the show are Haddock's (first heard when he performs the trick with the whisky, later heard in full at Moulinsart and the port) and Soleil, or Tintin's theme, sung first after his leaving the hospital and as a finale.

A CD release, containing 18 studio-recorded songs sung by the original cast, appeared in 2002. Most songs were present in their full versions as heard in the show. Some songs were not featured, partly because they were variations on others already present (for example, Rien dans les manches being a pared-down version of Mille millions de mille sabords). A notable omission was Promenade avec Tournesol, a cheerful tune that would have appeared between tracks 9 and 10 on the CD.

== Staging and effects ==
The show features special effects and staging including:

- A cliff parting to reveal the mummy of Rascar Capac
- A train steaming into the station
- The seven explorers trapped inside revolving crystal balls
- A ball of lightning lifting Calculus into the air on his chair
- A flying boat taking off
- A condor in flight, with Tintin hanging from its legs
- A waterfall drawn from a 6.5-tonne reservoir
- A total solar eclipse

== Recordings ==
Tabas & Co. has released a recording.
