= Kuifje – De Zonnetempel (De Musical) =

Kuifje – De Zonnetempel De Musical
- Original Cast Recording
- Music: Dirk Brossé
- Lyrics: Seth Gaaikema; Frank van Laecke
- Book: Seth Gaaikema; Frank van Laecke; Didier van Cauwelaert
- Basis: The Adventures of Tintin comics The Seven Crystal Balls and Prisoners of the Sun by Hergé
- Productions: 2001 Antwerp

Kuifje – De Zonnetempel, subtitled De Musical, is a 2001 Belgian musical in two acts with music by Dirk Brossé, lyrics and scenario by Seth Gaaikema and Frank van Laecke, based on two of The Adventures of Tintin by Hergé: The Seven Crystal Balls (1948) and Prisoners of the Sun (1949). It premièred in Antwerp in September 2001 in Dutch, and was translated into French and premièred a year later in Charleroi as Tintin – Le Temple du Soleil.

== Synopsis ==
Note: This refers to the musical itself, not the books, and therefore use the Dutch names – English equivalents are given.

=== Act One ===
An expedition of seven scientists, the Sanders-Hardiman expedition, discovers the tomb of the Incan mummy Rascar Capac and provokes the anger of the Sun God. A curse descends upon them. Meanwhile, Kuifje (Tintin) and Bobbie (Snowy) arrive on the train at Molensloot (Marlinspike), and Kuifje talks to another traveller about the recent return of the expedition from Peru. He says that all will end badly, desecrating the burial chambers of the Incas like Tutankhamen's – five members of the expedition have already been mysteriously struck down.

Kuifje and Bobbie go to Kasteel Molensloot (Marlinspike Hall) where Kapitein Haddock (Captain Haddock) lives, and they meet Nestor the butler. He says that Haddock is currently horse-riding, but he shortly returns minus the horse. Haddock introduces their old friend Trifonius Zonnebloem (Professor Calculus), and then tries to show Kuifje a magic trick to turn water into whisky, which fails. Angry at not being able to do it, he takes Kuifje to the music hall to see Bruno the magician perform the trick.

That evening at the music hall, Kuifje and Haddock watch a performance by the opera singer Bianca Castafiore, which Bobbie turns into an impromptu duet. Haddock storms out from the show because of Castafiore's singing. Ragdalam the fakir and Yamilah the clairvoyant perform after Castafiore; after a few novelty predictions, Ragdalam asks Yamilah to tell him about a woman in the audience, Mevrouw Heining (Mrs Clarkson). She says that her husband is a photographer, and that he has been struck down by the curse of Rascar Capac. Mevrouw Heining leaves the show with her daughter, Fleur, when she receives a message that her husband is indeed ill. The magician's act is on, and Haddock stumbles onto the stage with a stage prop of a cow's head on his, after having got lost backstage trying to find his way out.

Kuifje, Haddock, and Zonnebloem go to the home of Professor Hippòlytus Bergamot (Professor Hercules Tarragon) to protect him, as he and Zonnebloem were students together. The detectives Janssen and Jansen (Thomson and Thompson) have also been sent to protect Bergamot. Bergamot reveals the mummy of Rascar Capac, and Kuifje reads the prophecy that the expedition found in his tomb. A storm comes, a ball of lightning comes down the chimney, destroys the mummy, and Bergamot realises that the prophecy is true. He is then struck down by the curse like the others.

At the hospital, Fleur and her mother sit by the bed of Heining. Kuifje arrives following Bergamot's attack, and Fleur asks him to help her 'papa'. Kuifje says he will, and leaves the hospital, whilst Fleur reassures her mother that everything will be alright because Kuifje will help them. In the garden, Zonnebloem mysteriously disappears following his donning the bracelet.

Later at Molensloot, Haddock is depressed because of Zonnebloem's disappearance. Castafiore, her accompanist Igor Wagner, and her maid Irma arrive; Castafiore announcing she will be staying for a period. Haddock and Kuifje manage to escape and head to the docks, where they discover that Zonnebloem has been spotted on the ship Pachacamac and is going to Peru. They catch a flying boat to Peru, and as it flies into the distance, the curtain closes on Act One.

=== Act Two ===
In Peru, Kuife and Haddock ask whether anyone has seen Zonnebloem, but are met with "No sé" ("I don't know") from everyone. Kuifje and Bobbie intervene to stop two men bullying a child. The child, Zorrino, reveals that he is an orphan living on the streets. Kuifje cheers him up by making him a little boat out of newspaper. Zorrino reveals that he knows where Zonnebloem is – he has been taken to the Zonnetempel (the Temple of the Sun). Zorrino leads them on a trek to the temple, with many perils against them. Bobbie is taken by a condor, and Kuifje climbs to the top of a cliff to look for him. He is attacked by the condor and, hanging onto its legs, is carried to the ground where he discovers Bobbie.

Meanwhile, the Janssens have found Zonnebloem's pendulum and attempt to use it to locate him. They mistake the indications given by the pendulum, and travel to the North Pole and meet an Eskimo, to the Far East, and to Scotland. Eventually they realise that the pendulum is pointing to Peru, where Kuifje and Haddock are, and head off in pursuit.

Kuifje, Haddock and Zorrino reach a waterfall. Zorrino and Haddock cross without incident, but as Kuifje crosses, with Bobbie in his rucksack, the rope snaps and they fall through the waterfall. He survives the fall and Haddock and Zorrino join him on the other side of the waterfall, in a cavern. At the same time, an Incan ceremony is taking place. Suddenly, Kuifje, Bobbie, Haddock and Zorrino crash through a hidden door in the wall.

They are blindfolded, and the Grote Inca (the Great Inca) declares that their punishment for profaning the temple is to die at the stake, but grants them one last wish : they are allowed to choose the day and hour of their deaths. Zorrino is separated from the others, visits them in their cell, and unfolds the little boat that Kuifje had made him. Kuifje reads the newspaper and finds their salvation. He tells the Incan guard that they wish to die in eighteen days' time. When the day comes, they are bound to the stake on the funeral pyre whilst a ceremony takes place. The Janssens arrive, having finally found Zonnebloem; they are also tied up. As they are about to be sacrificed, Kuifje "commands" the Sun; everything goes dark as the Moon moves in front of the Sun's face. Kuifje reveals to a startled Haddock that he read about the solar eclipse in the newspaper!

The Grote Inca begs Kuifje to make the Sun show its light again, and he does so. The Inca sets them free, as they have the favour of the Sun. Kuifje asks for the curse of Rascar Capac to be lifted, and in Europe the expedition members awake, to the delight of Mevrouw Heining and Fleur, who thank Kuifje. Back in Peru, the Grote Inca adopts Zorrino, and as everyone comes together, the cast takes their bows. The curtain falls.

== Scenes ==
Act One

1. The tomb of Rascar Capac
2. Molensloot railway station
3. Kasteel Mollensloot (exterior)
4. The music hall
5. Incan sorcery – the crystal balls
6. Bergamot's study
7. The hospital
8. Bergamot's garden with maze
9. Molensloot – interior of main entrance & grand staircase
10. The docks

Act Two

1. The marketplace
2. Castafiore's dressing room & the trek in Peru
3. Mountain ascent & condor flight
4. Desolate landscape
5. Janssens and the pendulum
6. Castafiore's dressing room & the jungle by night
7. The waterfall
8. The tomb of Rascar Capac
9. The Temple of the Sun
10. Prison cell
11. The sacrificial ceremony
12. Finale

== The Music ==
The show boasts an orchestral score composed by Dirk Brossé with lyrics by Seth Gaaikema and performed by Het Nationaal Orkest Van België (the National Orchestra of Belgium). There are around twenty different songs in the show, and a few reprises. The two main themes that run throughout the show are Haddock's (first heard when he performs the trick with the whisky, later heard in full at the docks) and De Zon, or Kuifje's theme, sung first after his leaving the hospital and as a finale.

Two CDs were released for the actual show – the first, a single of De Zon released on 9 April 2001 featured the actors playing Kuifje and Haddock, and a children's choir plus an instrumental version of the song. It also contained interactive features and some desktop wallpapers.

The second CD (released on 2 October 2001) was a full cast album for the show, containing 18 studio-recorded songs sung by the original cast. Most songs were present in their full versions as heard in the show, in the correct chronological order.

However, four songs were omitted completely – one, Wandelen in de zon met Zonnebloem takes place in the garden of Bergamot's villa; two others are sung by Castafiore and are heard at Molensloot in the first act De Milanese Nachtegaal, and in her dressing room in the second act Het leven is als een Opera. The last one is Bruno's song Niets in mouw that lasts about 30 seconds in the show. None of the reprises were recorded for the cast album.

A third CD released in 2002 contained a thirteen-minute orchestral suite based on some of the songs appearing in the show. The music was performed by the JWF Military Orchestra, conducted by Jørgen Jensen. It is listed in the Audio Releases section below.

A fourth CD was recorded in 2007 during a try-out in Kursaal Oostende. This recording has 19 tracks and is different than the second CD. It also includes three of the songs that were omitted from the original cast album, these being Wandelen in de zon met Zonnebloem, De Milanese Nachtegaal and Het leven is als een Opera, but at the same time omits the song De Professorenwals. 2 Radio tracks were added (Kuifje en Bobbie / De zon) so the total tracks on this CD is 21.

== Staging & effects ==
The show features an incredible array of special effects and imaginative staging, including :

- A cliff parting to reveal the mummy of Rascar Capac
- A train steaming into Molensloot station
- The seven explorers trapped inside revolving crystal balls
- Ball lightning lifting Zonnebloem into the air on his chair
- A flying boat taking off
- A condor in flight, with Kuifje hanging from the legs
- A waterfall drawn from a 6.5 tonne reservoir
- A total solar eclipse

== Cast & crew ==
=== The Cast ===
- Kuifje – Tom Van Landuyt
- Bobbie – Zohra & Zihna
- Kapitein Haddock – Henk Poort
- Bianca Castafiore – Jacqueline van Quaille
- Janssen – Chris Van den Durpel
- Jansen – Guido Naessens
- Professor Zonnebloem – Frans Van den Aa
- Grote Inca – Chris De Moor^{1}
- Bergamot – Ernst Van Looy
- Bruno – Michele Tesoro
- Igor Wagner – Ton Peeters
- Directeur – Ton Peeters
- Ragdalam – Dirk Van Varenbergh
- Nestor – Pieter Korteknie
- Mevrouw Heining – Marianne Van der Vreken
- Irma – Katrien De Muynck

=== The Crew ===
- Based on the books by: Hergé
- Scenario: Seth Gaaikema & Frank Van Laecke
- Lyrics: Seth Gaaikema
- Music: Dirk Brossé
- Director: Dirk de Caluwé
- Technical manager: Jakob Sagiv
- Décor: Paul Gallis
- Lighting: Jaak Van de Velde
- Sound: Erik Loots
- Hair: Sjoerd Didden, Harold Mertens & Winnie Gallis
- Costumes: Yan Tax
- Choreography: Martin Michel
- Arrangement: Frank Van Laecke
- Produced by: Tabas & Co & Moulinsart

== Performance details ==
- Première : 15 September 2001, at the Stadsschouwburg in Antwerp
- Final performance : 17 February 2002, at the Stadsschouwburg in Antwerp

The show itself is two hours and ten minutes long, excluding the interval. It was professionally filmed for Dutch television and broadcast in its edited form on Canal+, in widescreen. It featured additional digital effects, such as bats flying during the descent into the tomb. The edits removed some of the delays inevitable with a live show, and a couple of sequences such as Zonnebloem and Bergamot's waltz (but still appeared on the CD), which in the live show was necessary as a 'stage wait'.

It has never seen a repeat broadcast or a commercial release, although personal recordings circulate amongst fans.

In 2007 the musical came to stage again this time with Jelle Cleymans as Kuifje, first in Het nieuwe Luxor in Rotterdam, The Netherlands, from May 22 until June 17, and then from July 8 until August 19 in Oostende, Belgium. Then finally it returned to Antwerp, where it was performed from October 18 until its final, November 1.

== Adaptations ==
The show was adapted as a French performance that premièred at Charleroi in 2002 as Tintin – Le Temple du Soleil – Le Spectacle Musical. It was also scheduled to be performed in Paris at the Hippodrome d'Auteuil on 8 November 2003, but was cancelled due to production difficulties.

== Audio releases ==
De Zon – the single

=== Kuifje – De Zon ===
- Composer : Dirk Brossé
- Number of discs : 1
- Label : Maestro
- Catalogue Number: ?
- Release date : 9 April 2001
- Track listing :
1. De Zon (Tom Van Landuyt, Henk Poort & Clari Cantuli children's choir)
2. De Zon (instrumentaal)

Released in a cardboard sleeve with accompanying leaflet advertising booking for the show. The CD features interactive content such as lyrics and desktop wallpapers.

=== Kuifje – De Zonnetempel ===
- Composer : Dirk Brossé
- Number of discs : 1
- Label : Maestro
- Catalogue Number: MMP023
- Release date : 2 October 2001
- Track listing :
1. Rascar Capac
2. Kuifje en Bobbie
3. Ah, ik lach (duet voor diva en hond)
4. De 7 kristallen bollen
5. De professorenwals
6. Alles onder controle
7. Besmet
8. Kuifje, help ons
9. De Zon
10. Duizend bommen en granaten
11. No sé
12. In het rijk van arm en rijk
13. Vriendschap tot het eind der tijden
14. De slinger
15. Als het kampvuur brandt
16. Haddocks afscheid
17. De brandstapel
18. De Zon (finale)

Packaged in a jewel case with 24-page booklet containing full lyrics and cast photographs.

=== The Wind in the Willows ===
- Composer : Johan de Meij
- Number of discs : 1
- Label : Amstel Classics
- Catalogue Number: ?
- Release date : 5 May 2002
- Track listing :
1. The Wind in the Willows
2. Tintin – Prisoners of the Sun
3. Elisabeth – the Musical
4. The Lord of the Rings – Excerpts from Symphony No. 1

The second track is an orchestral suite composed of excerpts from the songs on the cast album, namely Rascar Capac, Als het kampvuur brandt, De professorenwals, Vriendschap tot het eind der tijden, De brandstapel & De Zon (finale). The suite's running time is 13:31.

=== Kuifje – De Zonnetempel (De musical) ===
- Composer : Dirk Brossé and Seth Gaaikema
- Number of discs : 1
- Label : Sabam
- Catalogue Number: 42519
- Release date : 2007
- Track listing :
1. Rascar Capac
2. Kuifje en Bobbie
3. Ah, ik lach (duet voor diva en hond)
4. De 7 kristallen bollen
5. Alles onder controle
6. Besmet
7. Kuifje, help ons
8. De Zon
9. Wandelen in de zon met Zonnebloem
10. De Milaneese nachtegaal
11. Duizend bommen en granaten
12. No sé
13. In het rijk van arm en rijk
14. Het Leven is een opera
15. Vriendschap tot het eind der tijden
16. Als het kampvuur brandt
17. Afscheid van de whisky
18. De brandstapel
19. De Zon (finale)

Radio tracks

1. Kuifje en Bobbie
2. De zon

Packaged in a jewel case with 24-page booklet containing full lyrics and cast photographs. Tracks 1–19 were recorded live on May 12, 2007, in Kursaal Oostende.

== Notes ==
1. The actor who played the Grote Inca, Chris De Moor, is the son of Bob de Moor, the chief collaborator of Hergé.
