= Tintin and the Temple of the Sun =

Belgian-French-Swiss animated film

- Theatrical release poster
- Directed by: Eddie Lateste
- Screenplay by: Eddie Lateste; Jos Marissen; László Molnár; Hergé
- Dialogue by: Greg
- Based on: The Seven Crystal Balls; Prisoners of the Sun by Hergé
- Produced by: Raymond Leblanc
- Cinematography: François Léonard
- Edited by: László Mola
- Music by: François Rauber; Songs: Jacques Brel
- Production companies: Dargaud Films; Belvision Studios
- Distributed by: Parafrance Films
- Release date: 13 December 1969 (France)
- Running time: 77 minutes
- Countries: France; Belgium; Switzerland
- Language: French

Tintin and the Temple of the Sun (original title Tintin et le temple du soleil) is a 1969 animated film produced by Belvision Studios. A co-production between Belgium, France and Switzerland, it is an adaptation of Hergé's two-part Tintin adventure The Seven Crystal Balls and Prisoners of the Sun.

== Plot ==
When seven archaeologists find an old Inca mummy, they become the victims of an Inca curse. Back in Europe, they fall into a deep sleep one by one and only once a day, at the same time, do they wake up for a few minutes and have hallucinations of the Inca god. The story begins with the sixth archaeologist falling asleep by the contents of a crystal ball thrown into his car by Incas.

Professor Tarragon stays with Tintin, Snowy and Captain Haddock in Marlinspike Hall, when the Thompsons arrive, Tarragon learns from them that he is the last conscious Professor. A thunderstorm approaches and the lights go out. This is used by the Incas to put the last one in sleep and to capture Professor Calculus, who has proved to be a desecrater of the sanctuary by putting on the bracelet of the Inca sun god.

His friends Tintin and Haddock follow the track to Peru, up to the mountains through snow and jungle and finally discover the Temple of the Sun, where they are caught. Their only choice is to choose the day on which they want to be burned to death by the sun. Tintin chooses wisely and is able use an eclipse. At the end he achieves forgiveness, the archaeologists are cured from their curse and Calculus is released.

== Cast ==
Character	Original	English
Tintin	Philippe Ogouz	Unknown
Captain Haddock	Claude Bertrand	Unknown
Zorrino	Lucie Dolène	Unknown
Chiquito	Georges Atlas	Unknown
The beefy mustache attacking Zorrino	Albert Augier	Unknown
The witness stammers at St. Nazaire	Jacques Balutin	Unknown
Peruvian commissioner	Jean-Henri Chambois	Unknown
A bandit on the boat	Henry Djanik	Unknown
The Santa Clara station master	Gérard Hernandez	Unknown
The policeman in the radio control room	Jean-Louis Jemma	Unknown
Maita	Linette Lemercier	Unknown
Jauga station master	Serge Lhorca	Unknown
One of the 7 scholars	Jacques Marin	Unknown
The great Inca, father of Princess Maïta	Jean Michaud	Unknown
Nestor	Bernard Musson	Unknown
The speaker, presenter of the expedition of the 7 scientists	Roland Ménard	Unknown
The doctor of the 7 scientists	Serge Nadaud	Unknown
A bandit with a knife in the mountain	Serge Nadaud	Unknown
An Inca guard	Serge Nadaud	Unknown
Professor Calculus	Fred Pasquali	Unknown
Thompson	Guy Piérauld	Unknown
Thomson	Paul Rieger	Unknown
Professor Tarragon	André Valmy	Unknown
One of the 7 scholars	Henri Virlojeux	Unknown

=== Additional Voices ===
- Geneviève Beau
- Jacques Jouanneau
- Jacques Ruisseau
- Jacques Sablon
- Bachir Touré

== Changes from the books ==
Many scenes from the source books are deleted; in fact the whole of The Seven Crystal Balls is condensed into twenty minutes of film. Events were changed and some are added. For example, the Prince of the Sun's daughter is introduced, who tries to beg her father to spare the prisoners (and likes Zorrino). Also, Thomson and Thompson accompany Tintin and Captain Haddock on their quest to rescue Professor Calculus, whereas in the books their only role is attempting to use dowsing in order to find Tintin and his friends (and their arrival in the Incan village delays the planned execution).

== Production ==
Coming after the success of the Belvision cartoon series, Hergé's Adventures of Tintin, there was a lot of publicity for the movie (which was the first of two animated films, the second being 1972's Tintin and the Lake of Sharks). Jacques Brel, a fan of the series, contributed two songs to the soundtrack, entitled Chanson de Zorrino and Ode a la Nuit.
