= Jacqueline Van Quaille =

Belgian operatic soprano (1936–2026)

- Van Quaille, in the 1960s
- Born: 6 October 1936; Gentbrugge, Belgium
- Died: 16 October 2026 (aged 90); De Panne, Belgium
- Education: Royal Conservatory of Ghent
- Occupations: Operatic soprano; Academic teacher
- Organizations: Ghent Opera; Opernhaus Wuppertal; Graz Opera; Royal Conservatory of Ghent

Jacqueline Van Quaille (6 October 1936 – 16 October 2026) was a Belgian operatic soprano. Based at the Ghent Opera, Opernhaus Wuppertal and Graz Opera, she appeared on stage for 56 years. She performed lead roles in European opera houses, with a wide repertoire including contemporary opera and operettas. Pamina in Mozart's Die Zauberflöte and Puccini's Tosca were among her signature roles. She portrayed Isolde in Wagner's Tristan und Isolde in a 1970 television film. Later in her career, she also performed in musicals, taught at the Royal Conservatory of Ghent, and founded an operetta theatre.

== Life and career ==
=== Early life ===
Jacqueline Van Quaille was born in Gentbrugge on 6 October 1936. She studied at the Royal Conservatory of Ghent, voice with M. Teugels and performance with Karel Locufier. After graduating in 1957, she worked first at the West Flemish Operetta Company in Kortrijk and Roeselare.

=== Belgium ===
Van Quaille made her debut at the Ghent Opera in 1958 as Pamina in Mozart's Die Zauberflöte, which became one of her signature roles. She performed mostly French and Italian operas there. She portrayed the title role of Verdi's La traviata, studying the role with soprano Vina Bovy. She also appeared as Verdi's Desdemona in Otello and Leonora in La forza del destino, and in Puccini's title roles of La fanciulla del west and Tosca. She performed in operettas such as Lehár's The Land of Smiles and The Merry Widow and The Gypsy Baron by J. Strauss. Van Quaille also became a regular performer at the Antwerp Opera.

=== Elsewhere in Europe ===
After Van Quaille won the King Baudouin Prize at the Verviers competition, she was invited to the Opernhaus Wuppertal and was a member of its company from 1961 to 1964. She participated there in the world premiere of Leo Justinus Kauffmann's Das Perlenhemd in 1963. The same year, she took part in the French premiere of Busoni's Doktor Faust at the Théâtre des Champs-Élysées in Paris, alongside Mario Del Monaco in the title role. During that time, she appeared at the Oper Frankfurt as Chrysothemis in Elektra by R. Strauss, alongside Astrid Varnay, and in Nice and Besançon.

Van Quaille worked at the Graz Opera from 1964 to 1968. She appeared as a guest at the Vienna Volksoper, at the Theater am Gärtnerplatz in Munich, and the Essen Opera. She studied again, with Ettore Campogalliani in Mantua, who had also coached Renata Tebaldi and Carlo Bergonzi. She also auditioned to study at the academy of La Scala in Milan and was accepted, but decided to remain closer to home, where she had three children then. On a tour through Romania in 1978, she appeared as Amelia in Verdi's Un ballo in maschera and in the title roles of Puccini's Manon Lescaut and Tosca.

She performed more dramatic roles at the Opéra Royal de Wallonie in Liège, again Leonora and Amelia, alongside Nicolae Herlea and Barry Morell, Giordano's Andrea Chénier alongside Alain Vanzo, the title role of Arabella and Lady Macbeth in Verdi's Macbeth. She portrayed Sieglinde in Wagner's Die Walküre in the 1983 opening of the Vlaamse Opera.

Her operatic repertoire included leading roles in Mozart operas, the title role in Beethoven's Fidelio, Matilda in Rossini's Guillaume Tell, the title role of Zandonai's Francesca da Rimini, Marietta in Korngold's Die tote Stadt, the Marschallin in Der Rosenkavalier by R. Strauss, Giorgietta in Puccini's Il tabarro, Santuzza in Mascagni's Cavalleria rusticana, Ursula in Hindemith's Mathis der Maler. She performed roles in d'Albert's Tiefland, Wagner's Tannhäuser and La Damnation de Faust by Berlioz, and in works by Gounod, Massenet, and Dvořák. She also performed in contemporary operas, such as Magda Sorel in Menotti’s The Consul.

Van Quaille performed in Ghent and Antwerp regularly until 1988. In Ghent she appeared in Cilea's Adriana Lecouvreur alongside Rita Gorr. One day in Ghent, she sang in a concert in the morning in the Feestzaal at Vooruit, then in an afternoon premiere of La forza del destino, and again in the evening as Tosca. She appeared at the Dutch National Opera in 1989 as Leonora in Il trovatore; Opera Magazine Netherlands reported that she excelled even in a mediocre performance. She performed at La Monnaie in Brussels as Juno in Offenbach's Orphée aux Enfers in 1997, and also in Les Troyens by Berlioz, alongside Guy Chauvet, and in Wagner's Der fliegende Holländer. She appeared as Larina in Tchaikovsky’s Eugene Onegin at both the Aix-en-Provence Festival and the Salzburg Festival. In Salzburg she performed in 2000 as Bacchis in Offenbach's La belle Hélène, staged by Herbert Wernicke. In 2014, she performed at LOD muziektheater in their production of Ghost Road.

=== Recordings and films ===
Van Quaille appeared in television opera films for RTBF including Manon Lescaut and Verdi's Don Carlos. She portrayed Isolde in Wagner's Tristan und Isolde, alongside Claude Heater as Tristan, filmed in 1968 on the Belgian coast and at the Gravensteen in Ghent, and released in 1970. She recorded the musicals Kuifje – De Zonnetempel and The Sound of Music on CD. She also appeared in Orphée aux Enfers on DVD in 1979 and in Eugene Onegin in 2002.

She also appeared as Bianca Castafiore in the animated film Tintin and the Temple of the Sun. The music critic Ronny de Schepper noted that her vibrato made her unintelligible and there was insufficient acting. Her final performance was in a short film in Ghent language, Passé.

=== Concert and teaching ===
Van Quaille was also a noted concert singer. She founded her own operetta company, Aruna. She taught at the Music Academy of Ghent, the music school of Veurne, and privately.

=== Personal life ===
Van Quaille had three children. She died in De Panne on 16 October 2026, at the age of 90. (Note: Some sources mislabel her age as "88".)
