= Raymond Leblanc =

Belgian film director

- Born: 22 May 1915 Neufchâteau, Belgium
- Died: 21 March 2008 (aged 92) Brussels, Belgium
- Areas: Comic book publisher, film producer
- Notable works: The Adventures of Tintin
- Awards: Alph-Art d'Honneur prize (2003)

Raymond Leblanc (French: [ləblɑ̃]; 22 May 1915 – 21 March 2008) was a Belgian comic book publisher, film director and film producer, best known for publishing works such as The Adventures of Tintin by Hergé and Blake and Mortimer by Edgar P. Jacobs. He debuted, published, and promoted many of the most famous Franco-Belgian comics. Leblanc and his two partners created Le Lombard publishing, Tintin magazine, PubliArt advertising agency, and Belvision Studios.

== Biography ==
Raymond Leblanc was a resistance fighter during the Second World War in the Mouvement National Royaliste (MNR) group. When the war ended in 1945, Leblanc set up new offices at 55, Rue du Lombard, establishing his publishing house, Le Lombard. Years later after Leblanc's retirement, he explained in an interview the beginnings of the Tintin legacy. On the subject of creating a new magazine for young people, he said, "We thought this was an interesting idea, and started looking for a name. We ended up eventually with Tintin, Hergé’s comic book hero. Literally everyone knew that character at that moment. The question however was, where was Hergé?"

The Adventures of Tintin creator Hergé, having worked for the collaborationist newspaper Le Soir, was out of a job and even denied the right to work. (Note: Hergé had been sacked, arrested, cleared of charges, released, and then denied the right to work. The Adventures of Tintin serial had been interrupted near the end of The Seven Crystal Balls, on page 49; page 50 would be the first page published in Tintin magazine, eighteen months later.) Leblanc arranged a meeting with Hergé, understood his dilemma, and saw an opportunity. Leblanc offered to clear Hergé's name and, that settled, offered him a new publishing venue for The Adventures of Tintin: the opportunity to continue to serialise his title in Leblanc's new weekly 12-page, comics journal, Le journal de Tintin (Tintin magazine), the first project of Le Lombard. Hergé accepted, and in 1946, Belgian comics fans were treated, not only to the return of Tintin, but to the debut of many new Franco-Belgian comics on a weekly basis, some appearing in Hergé's signature ligne claire style.

The years 1954 and 1956 saw Leblanc launching two other creative ventures: the advertising agency PubliArt, a publicity division of Le Lombard using comics characters in its projects, and Belvision Studios, which produced short and full-length animated films for television and cinema.

== Filmography ==
Animated TV series

- Chlorophylle (1954)
- Suske en Wiske (1955)
- Hergé's Adventures of Tintin (1957–1964)

Animated feature films

- L'Affaire Tournesol (téléfilm) (1964)
- Pinocchio in Outer Space (1965)
- Asterix the Gaul (1967)
- Asterix and Cleopatra (1968)
- Tintin and the Temple of the Sun (1969)
- Daisy Town (1971) – based on Lucky Luke
- Tintin and the Lake of Sharks (1972)
- I, Tintin (1975) – documentary
- The Smurfs and the Magic Flute (1976)
- Gulliver's Travels (1977)

Animated shorts

- Cubitus (1977)
- Clifton (1984)
- Oumpah-pah
- Spaghetti à la Romaine
