= Professor Calculus =

Comic character by Belgian cartoonist Hergé

- Professor Calculus (Professeur Tournesol), by Hergé

Publication information
- Publisher: Casterman (Belgium)
- First appearance: Red Rackham's Treasure (1943); The Adventures of Tintin
- Created by: Hergé

In-story information
- Full name: Cuthbert Calculus
- Partnerships: List of main characters
- Supporting character of: Tintin

Professor Cuthbert Calculus (French: Professeur Tryphon Tournesol [pʁɔ.fɛ.sœʁ tʁi.fɔ̃ tuʁ.nə.sɔl], meaning 'Professor Tryphon Sunflower' or, more scientifically, 'Professor Tryphon Litmus' – papier tournesol is 'litmus paper' in English) is a fictional character in The Adventures of Tintin, the comics series by Belgian cartoonist Hergé. He is Tintin's friend, an absent-minded professor and half-deaf physicist, who invents many sophisticated devices used in the series, such as a one-person shark-shaped submarine, the Moon rocket, and an ultrasound weapon. Calculus's deafness is a frequent source of humour, as he repeats back what he thinks he has heard, usually in the most unlikely words possible. He does not admit to being near-deaf and insists he is only slightly hard of hearing in one ear, occasionally making use of an ear trumpet to hear better.

Calculus first appeared in Red Rackham's Treasure (more specifically in the newspaper prepublication of 4–5 March 1943), and was the result of Hergé's long quest to find the archetypal mad scientist or absent-minded professor. Although Hergé had included characters with similar traits in earlier stories, Calculus developed into a much more complex figure as the series progressed.

== Character history ==
Calculus learned savate at university, but is somewhat out of practice in middle-age

Calculus is a genius, who demonstrates himself throughout the series to be an expert in many fields of science, holding three PhDs in nuclear and theoretical physics, and planetary astronomy. He is also an experienced engineer, archaeologist, biologist and chemist. Many of his inventions precede or mirror similar technological developments in the real world (most notably the wall bed and the Moon rocket, but also his failed attempt at creating a colour television set). He seeks to benefit humankind through his inventions, developing a pill that cures alcoholism by making alcohol unpalatable to the patient, and refusing under great duress to yield his talents to producing weapons of mass destruction. Calculus is also shown to be in the midst of inventing steerable roller skates during The Red Sea Sharks, although the final product is never shown, with the invention being only merely a sideshow in the overall plot. Much of Calculus's more dangerous work is criticized by Captain Haddock, although Calculus usually interprets this the other way round: his deafness often leads him to misinterpret Haddock's words, preventing him from hearing his real opinion.

Calculus's deafness is a frequent source of humour in his interactions with other people, as he often repeats back what he thinks he has heard, usually in the most unlikely words possible. Additionally, he often diverts the subject of a conversation by responding to a misinterpreted remark. For example, "But I never knew you had...." leads Calculus to respond, "No, young man, I am not mad!" In the same book he believes that Tintin and Haddock are talking about his sister, before remembering a few moments later that he does not have a sister. He is not perturbed by his handicap, even if it is a source of deep frustration to his friends. He himself does not admit to being near-deaf and insists that he is "only a little hard of hearing in one ear."

In the course of the Moon books, however, Calculus leads a team of scientists and engineers working on a major rocket project, motivating him to adopt an ear trumpet, and later a hearing aid, and for the duration of the adventure he has near-perfect hearing. This made him a more serious character, even displaying leadership qualities that had not been shown before or since. However, after completing the journey to the Moon, Calculus discarded his hearing aid, forcing his friends to readjust to his hearing impairment (aside from one panel in The Castafiore Emerald, when Tintin is seen speaking to him through his ear-trumpet); this restored the humour surrounding him, though it could be that he finds his deafness useful since it enables him to focus on his work (something useful for The Calculus Affair, since he was referencing ultrasonic sound).

Calculus maintains a laboratory at Marlinspike Hall, in which he conducts various experiments. He is fairly protective of his work, on occasion hiding his scientific endeavours from Tintin and Haddock (which gets him into trouble in The Calculus Affair). His lab is also stripped of all its apparatus in the same book. On an earlier occasion, during his efforts to find an antidote to Formula Fourteen in Land of Black Gold, Calculus almost destroyed half of Marlinspike in an explosion.

Although generally a mild-mannered (if somewhat oblivious) figure, Calculus flies into an uncharacteristic rage if he feels insulted or ridiculed. He is especially provoked if he ever hears Haddock (or anyone else) call him a "goat". On one famous occasion in Destination Moon, he displays uncontrollable ire ("Goat, am I?") when an irritated Haddock accuses him of "acting the goat" (French: faire le zouave; "acting like a goat" in the Golden Press American English translation) by attempting to build a Moon rocket. His subsequent tirade and blatant disregard for security terrifies the usually ebullient Captain; he even lifts the director of security barring his way onto a coat hook. Another occasion is in Flight 714 to Sydney when, due to some misunderstanding, he physically assaults Laszlo Carreidas and has to be held back with great effort by Haddock and Tintin. In the same book, despite his deafness, he hears Captain Haddock tell him that he's "acting the goat", but Haddock quickly prevents the severe reaction from occurring. Earlier in Red Rackham's Treasure Calculus is shown with a frown for a few moments when he thinks that the Captain lied to him that Tintin had gone for a row, when Tintin actually was diving to search for treasure. Despite his gentle nature, Calculus is rather sensitive about his work and does not appreciate being ridiculed or belittled for his scientific efforts.

In spite of all this, his friends stick by him come what may. Haddock invited him to stay at Marlinspike Hall after Calculus discovered it is the captain's ancestral home and bought it in his name thanks to money he had earned through selling the patent for his shark-submarine. He did this because Haddock and Tintin had provided him with the opportunity to test the submersible when they were searching for Red Rackham's Treasure. Tintin and Haddock crossed the world on at least two occasions (Prisoners of the Sun and The Calculus Affair) in order to save him from kidnappers.

He occasionally comments that he was a great sportsman in his youth, with a very athletic lifestyle. He is a former practitioner of the French martial art savate, although a demonstration in Flight 714 to Sydney shows him to be more than a bit rusty.

== Inspirations ==
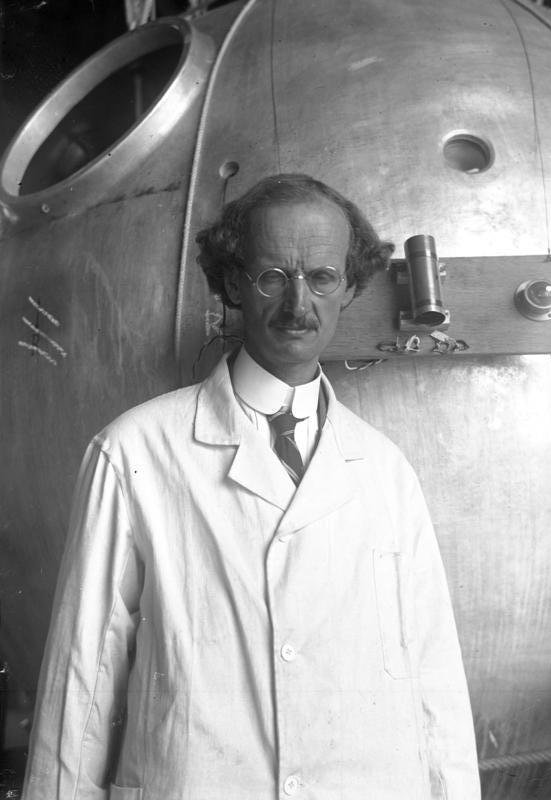
Auguste Piccard in 1932

Calculus is partly modeled on inventor Auguste Piccard (1884–1962), Hergé stated in an interview with Numa Sadoul: "Calculus is a reduced scale Piccard, as the real chap was very tall. He had an interminable neck that sprouted from a collar that was much too large... I made Calculus a mini-Piccard, otherwise I would have had to enlarge the frames of the cartoon strip." The Swiss physics professor held a teaching appointment in Brussels when Hergé spotted his unmistakable figure in the street. In The Castafiore Emerald, Bianca Castafiore mentions that Calculus is "famous for his balloon ascensions", an ironic reference to Piccard.

Philippe Goddin has suggested that Calculus' deafness was inspired by Paul Eydt, whom Hergé had known at Le Vingtième Siècle where Tintin's adventures had first appeared. Cuthbert Calculus' original French name is "Tryphon Tournesol" and Tryphon was the name of Hergé's plumber.

In contrast to his unquestionable scientific merits, Calculus is a fervent believer in dowsing, and carries a pendulum for that purpose. Hergé himself was a believer in the subject: dowser Victor Mertens had used a pendulum to find the lost wedding ring of Hergé's wife in October 1939.

== Calculus and his peers ==
Before Calculus appeared in Red Rackham's Treasure, Hergé had featured other highly educated but eccentric scholars and scientists, such as the following:

- Sophocles Sarcophagus of Cigars of the Pharaoh who showed signs of being clumsy and forgetful before going completely mad.
- The absent-minded professor who appeared in The Broken Ear and who forgot his glasses, wore his cleaning-lady's overcoat, held his cane upside-down as if it were an umbrella, mistook a parrot for a man and left his briefcase next to a lamp post. In the original edition published in 1935 his name is given as Professor Euclide, after the Greek mathematician known as the "Father of Geometry".
- Professor Hector Alembick in King Ottokar's Sceptre, who had a habit of absent-mindedly throwing his cigarettes on the floor.
- Two astronomers from The Shooting Star also showed unusual and, in one case, mad behaviour: Professor Philippulus, or "Philippulus the prophet" represented the dilemmas some face over religious belief and scientific research. In his case the conflict took a toll on his mind when the end-of-the-world appeared to be imminent. He then went around wearing bedsheets and beating a gong to warn of the event and later disrupted the eve of departure of the expedition sent to find a meteorite.
- His colleague, Professor Decimus Phostle, though not mad, looked forward to the end of the world whose prediction he thought would make him famous. In contrast, he showed signs of maturity during the expedition when he called off the search for the meteorite in order to help a ship in distress.

Calculus's introduction appears to have supplied Hergé with the bizarre nature he wished to portray in a man of science. Other figures of high education were shown as more stable and level-headed. The members of the archaeological expedition who fall victim to The Seven Crystal Balls show no apparent signs of eccentricity. The most prominent member of this group is Calculus's friend Hercules Tarragon, with whom he attended university. Tarragon is a large, ebullient man, possessing a jovial nature, but not necessarily eccentric.

While he sometimes appears aloof when absorbed in his work, Calculus corresponds with other scientists and also collaborates with many of them on his projects. He works with Mr. Baxter and Frank Wolff on the Moon rocket and corresponds with ultrasonics expert Professor Alfredo Topolino of Nyon in The Calculus Affair.

== Relationship to women ==
Calculus is the only main character in the Tintin series to display signs of attraction to women. This is notably evident in his interactions with Bianca Castafiore, with whom he is smitten during her long stay at Marlinspike Hall in The Castafiore Emerald. During her stay, his botanic experiments lead him to create a new variety of rose, which he names in her honour. Nonetheless, he happily congratulates Captain Haddock on his "engagement" to Castafiore (in fact a media hoax which he unwittingly fuelled).

Calculus is also distressed by Castafiore's imprisonment in Tintin and the Picaros, and is adamant on going to her defence. In the same book, he is charmed by the unattractive Peggy Alcazar (wife of General Alcazar) and kisses her hand after she bluntly criticizes Tintin and Haddock (a remark that Calculus mistakes for a warm greeting).

== In other media ==
Calculus demonstrates the benefit of his Fruit d'or cooking oil to Nestor the butler

Calculus also featured frequently in the 1957–1963 Belvision TV series, as well as in other adaptations of the comics. The Belvision TV series is notable for depicting Calculus with perfect hearing.

Calculus' original French name was "Tournesol" which is not only the French term for "litmus paper" but also for sunflower. In the 1970s and 1980s, he starred in a series of cartoon television commercials for Fruit d'or products which included cooking oil and mayonnaise made from sunflower oil. Some of the ads would conclude with him floating up into the air to demonstrate how they kept a good healthy balance. Other characters from the books were also included.

A pseudonym variation was used on an album by Stephen Duffy – see Tin Tin and "Dr. Calculus".

== See also ==
- List of The Adventures of Tintin characters
