= Dirk Brossé =

Belgian conductor and composer

Knight Dirk Brossé
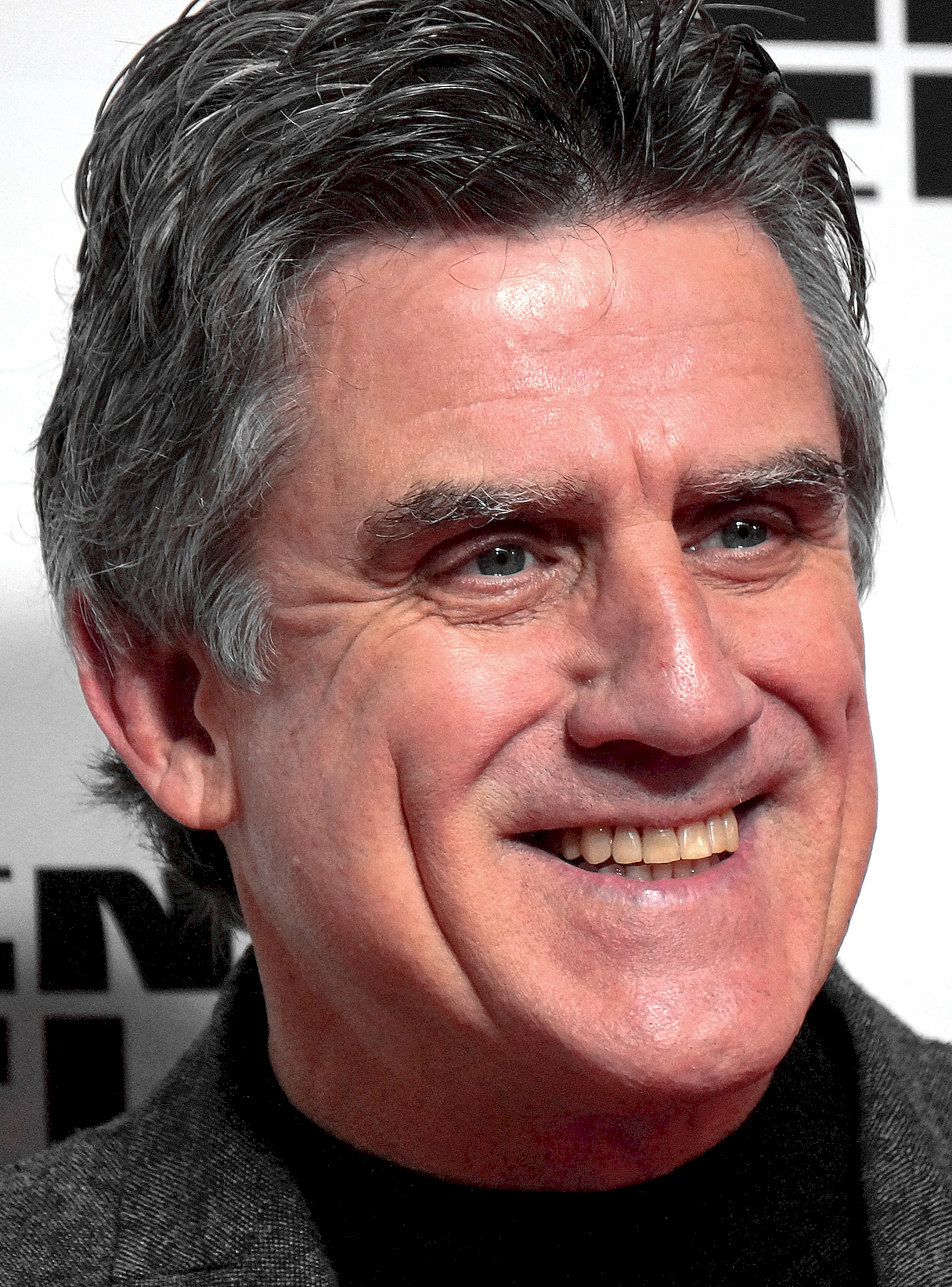
- Dirk Sir Brossé, Film Fest Gent 2024
- Born: 18 February 1960 (age 66); Ghent, Belgium
- Education: Royal Music Conservatory of Ghent; Royal Music Conservatory of Brussels
- Occupations: Composer; Conductor
- Era: Contemporary Classical Music

Dirk, Sir Brossé (born 18 February 1960) is a Belgian conductor and award winning composer. He has composed over 1800 works, including concerti, oratorios, lieder, chamber music, symphonic works. Brossé has composed extensively for stage, cinema, television. Conductor-emeritus of The Chamber Orchestra of Philadelphia, Honorary conductor Sinfonietta Cracovia and music director of Prima La Musica.

His score for the BBC/HBO series Parade's End (2012) was nominated for an Emmy Award. Brossé is currently music director of the Ghent Film Festival. John Williams chose him as principal conductor of the Star Wars in Concert World Tour. Brossé is also professor of composition and conducting at the Royal Conservatory of Ghent.

Brossé has conducted 120 international orchestras including London Symphony Orchestra (LSO), London Philharmonic Orchestra, Royal Philharmonic Orchestra, Vancouver Opera, Opéra National de Lyon, BBC Concert Orchestra, Hong Kong Chinese Orchestra and Orchestre de la Suisse Romande. In 2008, he made his first appearance at the Royal Albert Hall in London, conducting the LSO. In 2021 made his debut in Carnegie Hall New York. In 2010, at the request of the Hong Kong Chinese Orchestra, he wrote The Hallow-e'en Dances written for traditional Chinese instruments.

He has made more than 200 CD recordings and has collaborated with artists such as José Van Dam,Barbara Hendricks, Julia Migenes, Claron McFadden, Julian Lloyd Webber, Sabine Meyer, Alison Balsom, Salvatore Accardo, John Williams, Toots Thielemans, Hans Zimmer, Elmer Bernstein, Emma Thompson, Kenneth Branagh, Randy Crawford, Lisa Gerrard, Marcel Khalife, Mel Brooks, Maurane, Sinéad O'Connor, Maurice Jarre, Michel Legrand and Youssou N'Dour.

Brossé has worked with directors Stijn Coninx, Frank Van Laecke, Susanna White and Roland Joffé, and with writers Gabriel Garcia Marquez, Seth Gaaikema and Didier Van Cauwelaert. Brossé has been awarded the title Cultural Ambassador of Flanders, the Flemish Parliament's gold medal for Merit, the Achille Van Acker Prize, the Joseph Plateau Honorary Award and the Global Thinkers Forum Award for Excellence in Cultural Creativity. In 2010, Brossé was made an honorary citizen of Destelbergen. In 2013, he was elevated to Belgium's hereditary nobility, with the personal title of Sir.

== Education ==
Brossé's musical studies were initially undertaken at the Royal Music Conservatories of Ghent and Brussels before focusing on conducting studies in Maastricht, Vienna and Cologne, gaining his conducting diploma from the Musikhochschule of Cologne.

== Work as conductor ==
Brossé has been invited to conduct many of Belgium's major orchestras, including the Flemish Radio Orchestra (VRT), the National Orchestra of Belgium and the European Union Choir (Les Choeurs de l'Union européenne). Abroad he has conducted the Milan Symphony Orchestra, the Volgograd Philharmonic Orchestra, the Philharmonic Orchestra of Shanghai, London Philharmonic Orchestra, the Elgin Orchestra of Chicago, the Camerata St Petersburg, the Ulster Orchestra of Northern Ireland, the Orquestra Metropolitana de Lisboa and the National Orchestras of Venezuela, Colombia and Ecuador. In 2001 he started working with The Rotterdam Philharmonic Orchestra, The London Symphony Orchestra and the KBS Symphonic Orchestra of Seoul. In 2009 he started his work with Star Wars: In Concert. In 2008 and 2009 he had guest appearances in The Chamber Orchestra of Philadelphia, where he later debuted as musical director in 2010, succeeding Ignat Solzhenitsyn.

== Film and musical works ==
His works include songs, symphonic works, oratorios, chamber music and music for the theatre and film. Among his 20 distinctive film scores for award-winning films are "Daens" (Academy Award nomination 1993), "When the Light Comes", "A Peasant's Psalm", "Marie" (Nominated Overall Winner in the French Film Section at the Venice Film Festival in 1994) and the classic silent film "Visages d'Enfants". Artists with whom he has collaborated in performance include clarinetist Sabine Meyer, cellist Julian Lloyd Webber, the singers Sinéad O'Connor, Anne Cambier, Guy de Mey, Claron McFadden, Derek Lee Ragin, and, the renowned Hans Zimmer, Toots Thielemans, Howard Shore (for 'The Aviator') and Youssou N'Dour. Brossé scored the musical "Sacco & Vanzetti" commissioned by the Theatre of the Royal Ballet of Flanders in 1996. With 92 critically acclaimed performances in the Netherlands and Belgium, it is a dramatic study of minority victims in a hyper-patriotic state. Brossé wrote also the score for the musical based on the world-famous cartoon character "Tintin" created by Hergé, which premiered in September 2001 in Belgium. Brossé has been granted the title 'Cultural Ambassador of Flanders'. In 1999 Brossé was invited by the City Council of Shanghai, to conduct the Shanghai Philharmonic Orchestra in performances marking the 50th Anniversary of the founding of the People's Republic of China. In 2013 he received the Global Thinkers Forum 2013 Award for Excellence in Cultural Creativity.

== List of works ==
=== Works for orchestra ===
- 1986-On Safari
- 1986-7 Inch Framed
- 1988-Oscar for Amnesty
- 1989-El Golpe Fatal
- 1990-Bacob Overture
- 1991-Music in Mycology
- 1992-Ouvertura
- 1995-Flanders International Film Festival Overture
- 1995-Artesia
- 1995-Daens Suite
- 1996-Bit by Bit
- 1996-Principals
- 1996-Le Nozze di Sacco
- 1997-The Birth of Music
- 1997-Light Main Theme
- 1999-Millennium Overture
- 1999-Inferno
- 2008-Harbour Music
- 2010-The Hallow-e'en Dances
- 2010-Philadelphia Overture
- 2010-La Vie Aquatique
- 2010-Amore Pedestre
- 2014-Philadelphia Overture

=== Works for soloist(s) and orchestra / string orchestra / string quartet ===
- 1985-Meditation
- 1992-La Soledad de America Latina
- 1993-Elegy
- 1995-Elegy
- 1998-Black, White & In Between
- 1999-Black, White & In Between
- 1999-The Chinese Wall
- 1999-Warconcerto
- 2000-Elegy
- 2001-Sophia
- 2003-Elegy
- 2004-The Circle of Nature
- 2010-Echoes of Silent Voices
- 2012-In Motu
- 2013-Black, White & In Between
- 2013-Laura's Theme from Singularity
- 2014-Celloconcerto
- 2015-'A Portrait of Walter ridder Boeykens'

=== Works for string orchestra ===
- 1996-Tango Tout Court
- 2002-Kaleidoscope
- 2003-SI-RE
- 2011-In Memoriam Shostakovich
- 2015-For the unknown soldier

=== Works for voice and piano / small ensemble ===
- 1987-Il Pleure dans mon coeur
- 1988-Mets ta main dans ma main
- 1990-Four songs for Tijl & Nele
- 1994-Landuyt cyclus
- 1995-La Vida es un Sueño
- 2000-Beauty born of violence
- 2001-More is in thou
- 2003-I Loved You
- 2004-Love without End
- 2006-Live with me and be my Love
- 2006-Hope from Artesia
- 2007-Sluit de Keten
- 2008-Le Jasmin et la Rose
- 2011-Haiku Cycle 1
- 2014-De Lust van het Leven

=== Works for brass ensemble ===
- 1986- Des Sons Animés
- 1987-To(o) MAD
- 1989-Elegy for a lost Friend
- 1991-Prelude To a new Age
- 1991-The Golden Drop Tune
- 1994-Hymn of Praise from Daens
- 1994-Baroque Music
- 1994-On Safari
- 1995-Ode the Veterans of World War II
- 2007-The Dandi March

=== Soundtracks ===
- 1986 - Springen, by Jean Pierre De Decker
- 1986 - Marc and Nathalie, by Roland Verhaevert
- 1988 - Visages d'enfants, (1925), by Jaques Feyder
- 1988 - Boerenpsalm, by Roland Verhaevert
- 1988 - Misterie van het Lam, by Frederic Duchau
- 1989 - Koko Flanel, by Stijn Coninx
- 1992 - Daens, by Stijn Coninx
- 1993 - Als het leven een nieuwe wending neemt, by Serge Leurs
- 1993 - Oost-Vlaanderen, schat van een provincie, by Frank Van Laecke
- 1993 - Marie, by Marian Handwerker
- 1995 - A Forest is a Symphony, by WWF
- 1997 - Licht / When the Light comes, by Stijn Coninx
- 1998 - Planckendael koala's, by Stijn Coninx
- 2000 - Mijn eerste Sjeekspier, by Douglas Boswell
- 2001 - Follow me, by Francesca Marti
- 2002 - Music and Fly, by Francesca Marti
- 2004 - Romance, by Douglas Boswell
- 2005 - Knetter, by Martin Koolhoven
- 2005 - The Kavijaks, TV series by Stijn Coninx
- 2006 - Brod Ludaka, by Matthias Lebeer
- 2008 - Samaritan, by Douglas Boswell
- 2010 - La Vie Aquatique, (early 20th century), a silent documentary film
- 2010 - Amore Pedestre, (1914) a silent film by Marcel Fabre
- 2012 - Parade's End, TV series by Susanne White, for BBC/HBO
- 2013 - The Lovers, a feather film by Roland Joffé
- 2016 - Knielen op een bed violen, by Ben Sombogaart

=== Choral works ===
- 1989-Sanctus
- 2003-Cogito, Ergo Sum
- 2007-The American Dream

=== Works for symphonic wind band ===
- 1986-7 Inch Framed
- 1988-Oscar for Amnesty
- 1989-El Golpe Fatal
- 1989-Elegy for a lost Friend
- 1992-March for Justice from 'Daens'
- 1992-La Soledad de America Latina
- 1992-Music for a Celebration
- 1995-And the winner is...
- 1997-Light Main Theme
- 1999-Warconcerto
- 1999-Elegy
- 2000-Milestone Overture
- 2002-Tintin – Prisoners of the Sun
- 2007-Il Signor Brossini
- 2009-Musical Daens Suite
- 2009-Gandhi
- 2011-Philadelphia Overture
- 2011-Postcard from Bagdad
- 2011-Postcard from Kampala
- 2011-Postcard from Machu Picchu
- 2011-Postcard from Buenes Aires
- 2011-Postcard from Beijing
- 2011-Postcard from Benares
- 2011-Postcard from Vienna
- 2011-Postcard from Petra
- 2011-Postcard from Chernobyl
- 2011-Postcard from the Arctic
- 2014-14-18, suite for Symphonic Wind Band

=== Works for musicals ===
- 1989-Burger Übermensch
- 1996-Sacco & Vanzetti
- 2001-Tintin – Prisoners of the Sun
- 2002-The Prince of Africa
- 2005-Rembrandt
- 2007-Musical Daens
- 2011-Musical Ben X
- 2014-Musical Pauline & Paulette
- 2014-Musical 14-18
- 2014-The Last Friend of Napoleon
- 2015-The Story of Sacco & Vanzetti

=== Works for voice(s) and orchestra / string orchestra ===
- 1994-Landuyt Cyclus, Lyrics: Elie Saegeman (Dutch)
- 1995-Vredeslied, Lyrics: Brossé
- 1995-La Vida es un Sueño, Lyrics: Pedro Calderón de la Barca / Imelda Schrooyen (Spanish)
- 2000-Juanelo, Charles V Oratorio (2000), Lyrics: Elie Saegeman (English)
- 2000-Beauty born of Violence, Lyrics: Stephen Smith (English)
- 2001-X-cellent Love, Lyrics: M. Morton (English)
- 2002-Homeland, Lyrics: Lorraine Feather / Frank Van Laecke (English)
- 2003-I Loved You, Lyrics: Alexander Puchkin (English)
- 2004-Love without End, Lyrics: Lorraine Feather (English)
- 2008-Le Jasmin et la Rose, Lyrics: Jo Lemaire (French)
- 2013-The Vale of Years
- 2013-Vocalise from Parade's End
- 2014-Haiku Cycle 1, Lyrics: Herman Van Rompuy (English)
- 2015-How to make a Dadaist Poem, Lyrics: Tristan Tsara (English)
- 2015-I didn't raise my boy to be a soldier (2015), Lyrics: Alfred Bryan (English)
- 2015-Pace
- 2015-Bless them All, Lyrics: Herwig Deweerdt (English)

=== Works for theatre ===
- 1983-Reigen by Arthur Schnitzler
- 1990-Till Eulenspiegel by Charles de Coster
- 1991-In The Summer House by Jane Bowles
- 1991-Rembrandt oh Rembrandt by Patrick Van De Walle for theatre Exces

=== Works for ensemble / chamber music ===
- 1996-Tango Tout Court
- 2002-The Chinese Wall
- 2009-Earth Walk I, II & III
- 2009-Gipsy from The Birth of Music
- 2009-Beyond Perception from The Birth of Music
- 2009-Homeland
- 2009-La Soledad from La Soledad de America Latina
- 2009-City Lights from The Birth of Music
- 2014-Terra Incognita

=== Instrumental works ===
- 1986-Andante Malinconico
- 1988-Epiloque, from Boerenpsalm
- 1989-On his Own, from Koko Flanel
- 1993-Le Voyage Imaginaire
- 1994-Bis
- 1997-Ellen's Confession from When the Light Comes
- 1997-Lars' Theme from When the Light Comes
- 1998-Flying...as a bird
- 1998-Black, White & In Between
- 1999-Warconcerto
- 1999-Elegy
- 2000-Tango Tout Court
- 2001-Sophia
- 2004-Let's Chime the Bells
- 2005-La Soledad from La Soledad de America Latina
- 2010-Echoes of Silent Voices
- 2014-African Loop

=== Works for piano solo ===
- 1995-To my Secret Inspiration
- 1997-Lars the Trapper from When the Light Comes
- 1997-Snowfun from When the Light Comes
- 1997-Ellen's Theme from When the Light Comes
- 1997-Light Love Theme from When the Light Comes
- 2000-Broken Dream
- 2006-Secret Inspirations – Book I
- 2006-Fifth Avenue
- 2009-Hommage à Frédéric Chopin
- 2011-7 Nocturnes
- 2012-In Motu

== Awards and nominations ==
- 1986-CIAM Price for Best Filmscore – Belgium (Ghent)
- 1992-Academy Award Nomination for 'Daens' (Los Angeles)
- 1995-Cultural Ambassador of Flanders (Brussels)
- 2000-'Torenwachterprijs' by the City of Ghent (Ghent)
- 2006-Nominated for Dutch Musical Awards for 'Tin – Temple of the Sun' (Amsterdam)
- 2008-Awarded with the 'Achiel Van Acker Award 2008' – Belgium (Bruges)
- 2008-Awarded by the Belgian Government 'Gouden Erepenning' for merit (Brussels)
- 2009-Flemish Musical Award for 'Musical Daens' (Antwerp)
- 2010-Awarded with the 'Joseph Plateau Honorary Award' (Ghent)
- 2010-Honorary citizen of Destelbergen-Belgium (Destelbergen)
- 2011-Barrymore Theater Award (2011) for L' Histoire du Soldat / Chamber Orchestra of Philadelphia
- 2013-Award for Excellence in Cultural Creativity by Global Thinkers Forum (Athens)
- 2013-Elevated to Belgium's hereditary nobility, with the personal title of Knight (Brussels)
- 2013-Emmy Award nomination for the music for the series Parade's End / BBC/HBO (Los Angeles)
- 2014-'Gouden Label Muziektheater' by Klassiek Centraal for 'Musical 14-18' (Belgium)
- 2016-Golden Calf nomination for the soundtrack Knielen (Holland)
