= Marlinspike Hall =

Fictional location in The Adventures of Tintin

Tintin, Captain Haddock and Snowy approach Marlinspike Hall (Le château de Moulinsart).

Marlinspike Hall (French: Le château de Moulinsart [mu.lɛ̃.saʁ]) is Captain Haddock's country house and family estate in The Adventures of Tintin, the comics series by Belgian cartoonist Hergé.

The original French name of the hall, Moulinsart, is derived from Sart-Moulin, a village near Braine-l'Alleud in Walloon Brabant, Belgium. In an allusion to the Haddock family's maritime history, the hall's English name refers to the marlinspike, a tool used in seamanship to splice ropes. The Belgian corporation managing Hergé's work (principally Tintin) is also called Moulinsart S.A., now TintinImaginatio.

== History ==
Marlinspike Hall first appears in The Secret of the Unicorn (1943) as the home of the story's villains, the Bird brothers. By the end of the sequel Red Rackham's Treasure (1944), the manor is found to have been built by Haddock's illustrious ancestor Sir Francis Haddock. It is purchased by Professor Calculus on behalf of the Captain, and the fabled treasure itself is found hidden in the manor's old chapel, in the cellars. In the following years, Marlinspike provides a home base for Tintin, Captain Haddock, Professor Calculus, and Snowy in between their various adventures. In The Castafiore Emerald (1963), virtually all of the action takes place in the Hall, its grounds, or the surrounding countryside.

== Description ==
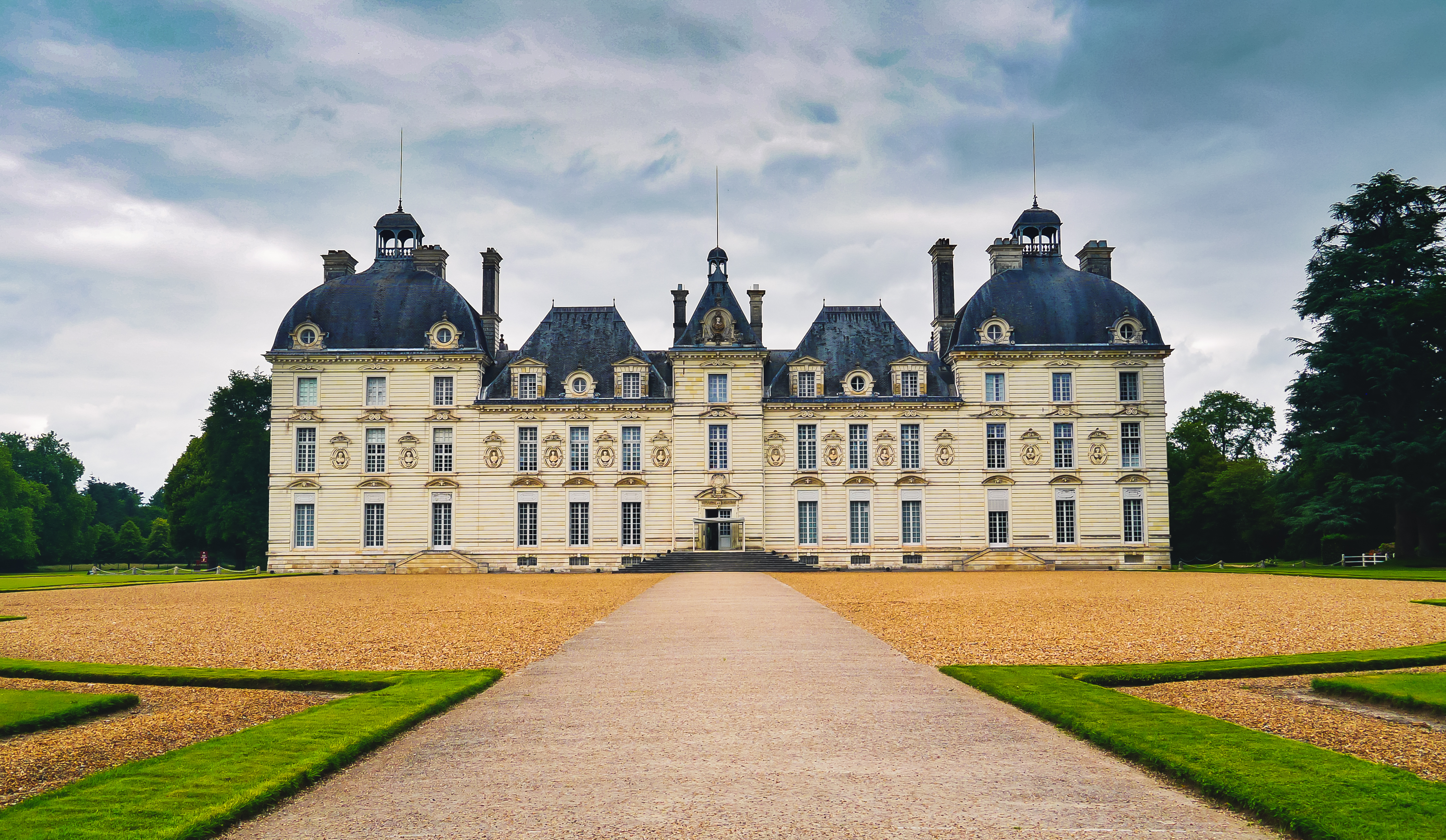
The Château de Cheverny was used as a model for Marlinspike Hall. The central tower and two inner wings are identical while the two outermost wings were not used.

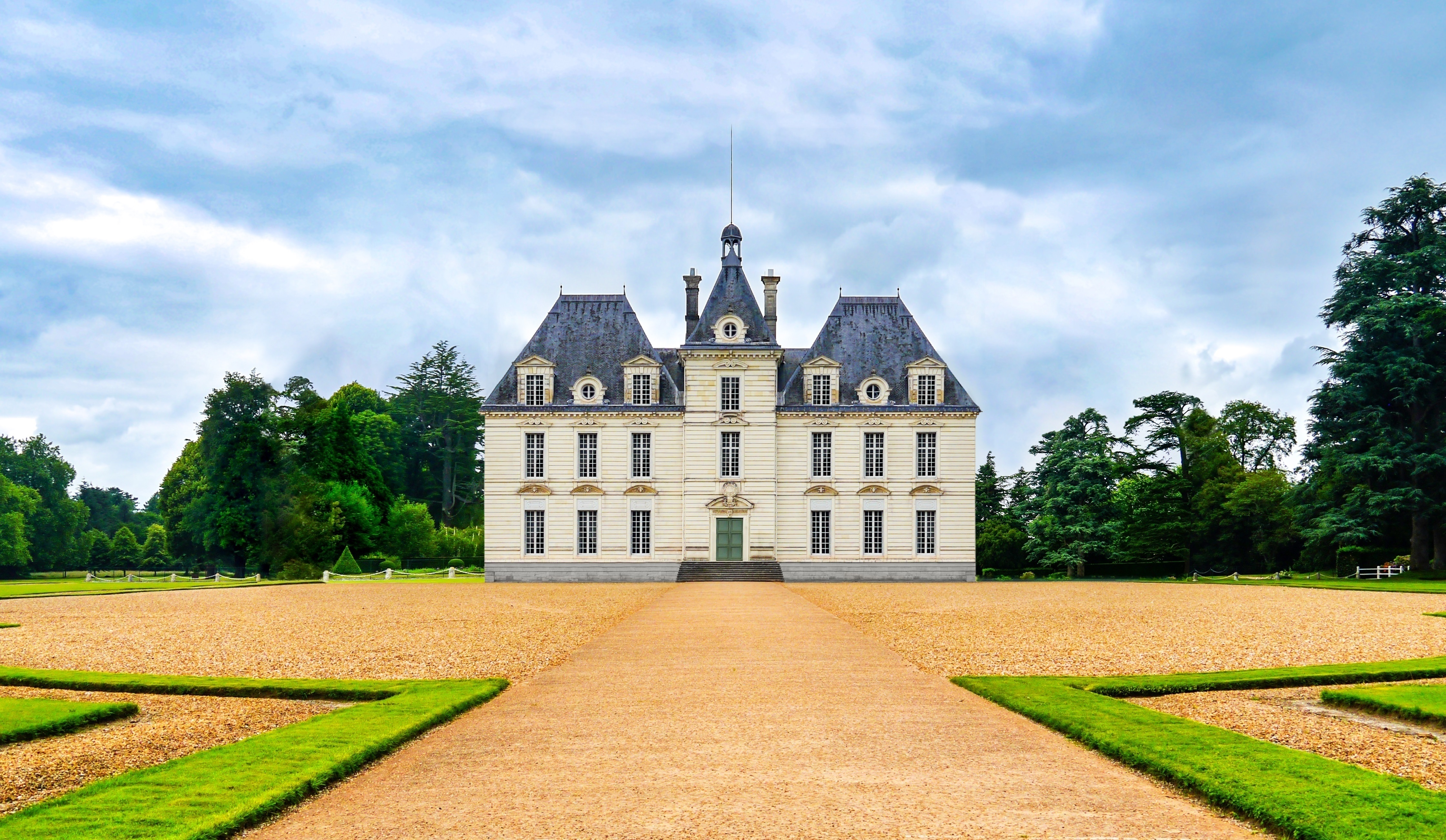
Simulation of Marlinspike Hall with the outer wings removed and some features changed

Marlinspike Hall is presented as a large and luxurious dwelling adorned with numerous works of art, antique furniture, and a gallery of the Haddock family's historic treasures. The grounds comprise a park with extensive woodlands, wide lawns, a rose garden, a high surrounding wall, at least two gates, a neighbouring meadow, and at least one adjacent building (used by Professor Calculus as a laboratory in The Calculus Affair, 1956). The size of the house and park would appear to require a number of domestic and gardening staff, but only one—the faithful Nestor, serving as butler to the Hall—is ever seen. (Note: Although a gardener is mentioned in The Red Sea Sharks and in The Castafiore Emerald .)

The hall is modelled after the central section of the Château de Cheverny, a manor in France. Hergé purposely left out the wings at the extremity of the original building, saying that it would be one thing for Captain Haddock to inherit a beautiful residence, but quite another thing for him to inherit a stately home.

=== Analysis ===
”Indeed it seems that the château, along with the group it shelters, takes on the role of defining this fictitious geography, in a very specific way. Moulinsart, in its peaceful rural setting, figures in a sense the opposite of adventure”, commented Nathalie Aubert.

== Location ==
Marlinspike Hall is located in Belgium. The original English language translators of the Tintin books caused some confusion to English-speaking readers by giving the address of Marlinspike Hall as "Marlinshire, England" in The Secret of the Unicorn. However, details such as car number plates, traffic travelling on the right hand side of the road, and the appearance of Marlinspike police (who wear the black-and-red uniforms of the Belgian Gendarmerie) confirm that Hergé's intention was to locate the Hall in his native Belgium rather than the left-hand driving United Kingdom. Moreover, it is explained in Red Rackham's Treasure that the Manor was built by an ancestor of Captain Haddock, the Chevalier François de Hadoque, a ship-of-the-line captain in the French Navy under King Louis XIV. In the Golden Press editions, the name Marlinspike Hall is Americanized to Hudson Manor, suggesting a location along the Hudson River in the State of New York.

== Sources ==
- Farr, Michael (2011) [First published 2001 by John Murray Publishers Ltd]. Tintin: The Complete Companion. Last Gasp. ISBN 978-0-86719-754-9.
- Lofficier, Jean-Marc; Lofficier, Randy (2007) [First published 2002]. The Pocket Essential Tintin. Harpenden, Hertfordshire: Pocket Essentials. ISBN 978-1-84243-226-6.
