= Seth Gaaikema =

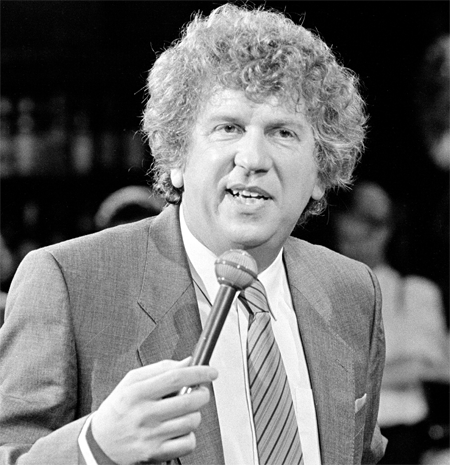
Seth Gaaikema in 1985

Seth Gaaikema (11 July 1939 – 21 October 2014) was a Dutch cabaret artist, writer, and lyricist.

Gaaikema was born in Uithuizen, Netherlands, as the son of a Mennonite minister. After studying Dutch and founding the student cabaret at the University of Groningen, he became a lyricist writing for established artists such as Wim Kan. He had met Kan while he was at university, and Kan soon became his idol and later his competitor. Gaaikema and Kan collaborated for a long time in what Kan later called a love-hate relationship; he criticized Gaaikema as a clone, as did other critics. Gaaikema was a solo artist since 1967, though his cabaret shows were often considered slow or too serious by critics; not until 1994 did he have a show praised by all critics. Gaaikema found it more and more difficult to maintain the audience's interest, especially when the new generation of cabaret artists introduced a harder-edged, more direct type of humor.

He did, however, receive praise for his translations of musicals, including My Fair Lady (his first, 1959), Kiss Me, Kate, Oliver!, Les Misérables, and The Phantom of The Opera. He was praised as, "above all, a playful master of language"; his reputation as lyricist and translator was celebrated more than his showmanship. Freek de Jonge, another Dutch comedian and minister's son, first saw Gaaikema perform in 1963 and though de Jonge's direction in cabaret was decidedly different, he greatly admired and was inspired by him, calling him a virtuoso of language.

Gaaikema came out as a gay man in 1988, in a New Year's Eve show. He married his manager, and the two lived in Schijndel, until Gaaikema died after a brief illness.
