= Abdullah (Tintin) =

Fictional character from The Adventures of Tintin

- The Adventures of Tintin character
- First appearance: Land of Black Gold (1949)
- Created by: Hergé
- Based on: Faisal II of Iraq
- Voiced by: Sophie Arthuys

In-universe information
- Occupation: Crown prince
- Relatives: Mohammed Ben Kalish Ezab, Tintin, Captain Haddock
- Origin: Khemed

Abdullah (French: Abdallah) is a fictional character from The Adventures of Tintin, created by Hergé. He first appeared in 1949 in the second version of Tintin in the Land of Black Gold. Aged 6 at the time of his first appearance, he is the son of Mohammed Ben Kalish Ezab, the Emir of Khemed, a fictional state on the Arabian Peninsula. The character of Abdullah is physically inspired by Faisal II, who acceded to the throne of Iraq in 1939, at the age of 3.

Adored by his father, who showered him with praise and gifts, Abdullah is an insufferable child-king, capable of the worst mischief. A capricious character, he plays many pranks at the expense of others, especially Captain Haddock, who is ready to run into danger to escape his presence. Abdullah's behavior reveals the powerlessness of his father, unable to assert his authority over his son or his kingdom.

Abdullah's numerous antics are one of the main sources of comedy in the final albums of the series. Like other secondary characters, such as Thomson and Thompson or Jolyon Wagg, he immediately makes the scenes in which he takes part entertaining, particularly through the comic pairing he forms with the Captain, who is alternately amused or annoyed by the young boy's behavior.

Finally, Abdullah follows in the long tradition of children's characters in the series, the rescue of a child suddenly separated from his parents being one of Hergé's most frequently used narrative devices.

== The character in the series ==
=== Identity and personality ===
The Khemed flag.

Abdullah is the only son of Emir Mohammed Ben Kalish Ezab, ruler of the fictitious state of Khemed on the Arabian Peninsula. He lives with his father in his palace at Hasch El Hemm, some distance from the capital Wadesdah. No information is given about his mother.

Abdullah is the only character in the series whose age is known: even before his first appearance in Tintin in the Land of Black Gold, the reader learns that he has just turned 6. To mark the occasion, his father has given him a red Bugatti Type 52, an electric sports car for children. Abdullah immediately reveals himself to be a capricious and unbearable child. Adored by his father, who lavishes superlatives on him, the young prince nonetheless irritates the other characters with his moodiness and his many pranks.

=== Inspiration sources ===
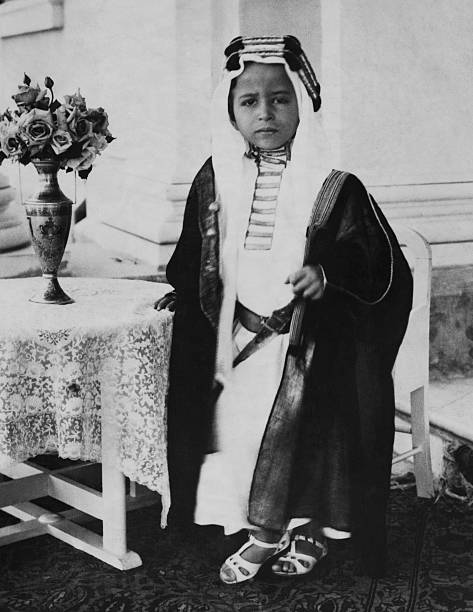
Faisal II of Iraq inspired the character of Abdullah.

To draw his character, Hergé was inspired by a photograph published in the August 1941 issue of National Geographic of the young king of Iraq, Faisal II, who came to the throne at the age of 3.

Studios Hergé colorist Guy Dessicy claims to have suggested the execrable character of young Abdullah to the cartoonist after reading the novel Martin Burney by O. Henry, in which a kidnapped child is so unbearable that his captors are prepared to pay the parents to give him back.

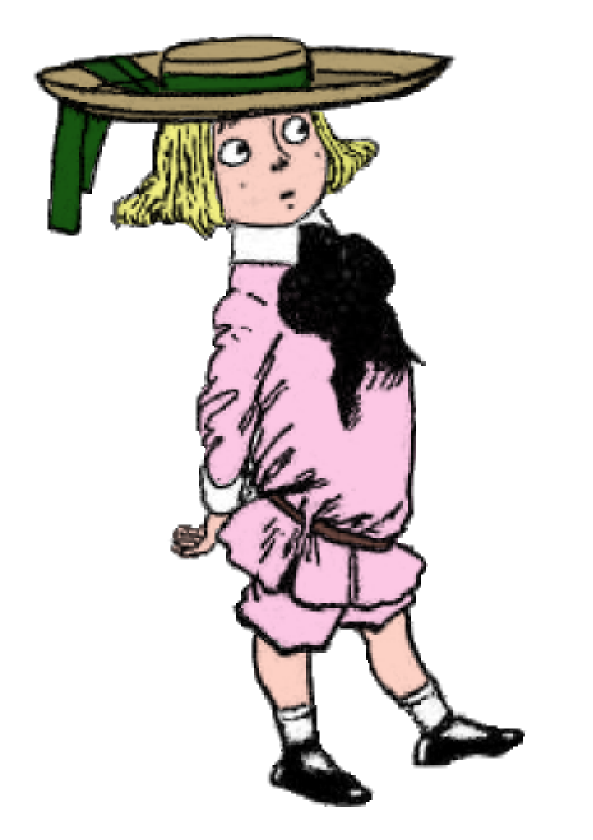
The character of Buster Brown.

It is also likely that Hergé drew inspiration from other child heroes he had discovered in illustrated magazines, such as the character of Buster Brown, a prankster from American high society created at the beginning of the 20th century by Richard Felton Outcault.

But Hergé's own work is one of the main sources of Abdullah's many tricks: some of his gags are taken from the exploits of Quick and Flupke, another of the cartoonist's series featuring the daily lives of two Brussels children from the Marollen district. This is the case of the explosive cigar gag, already used by Hergé in a plate entitled Un bon cœur.

=== Album appearances ===
Abdullah appears on June 16, 1949, in the fortieth plate of Tintin in the Land of Black Gold, when the second version of this adventure was published in Tintin's magazine. (Note: The first version of Tintin Land of Black Gold appeared in 1939 in Le Petit Vingtième, but was interrupted in early May 1940 by the start of the German occupation of Belgium during World War II.) The first thing the reader sees is a painted portrait of the young prince: Abdullah has just been kidnapped, and Tintin asks the Emir to show him a picture of his son so he can set off in search of him.

When the hero finally tracks him down in the lair of Doctor Müller, called "Professor Smith" in this album, Abdullah is uncooperative: Tintin is greeted by a spray of seltzer, before slipping on roller skates and being bitten to the quick by the prince, whose screams alert Müller's men. Abdullah's screams alerted Müller's men, and Tintin's spanking of the prince proved ineffective: in no hurry to get home, Abdullah escaped Müller's surveillance to play train. He is captured again by Müller, who takes him by car as he flees across the desert. Following yet another whim of the young child, the vehicle swerves. At gunpoint, Müller seizes the car from Tintin and Haddock, who are in pursuit, but Abdullah saves himself by jumping out of the moving car. Captain Haddock, however, spanks him again after he throws sand in Captain Haddock's eyes. However, when he is taken back to his father's house, he refuses to leave the Captain's arms.

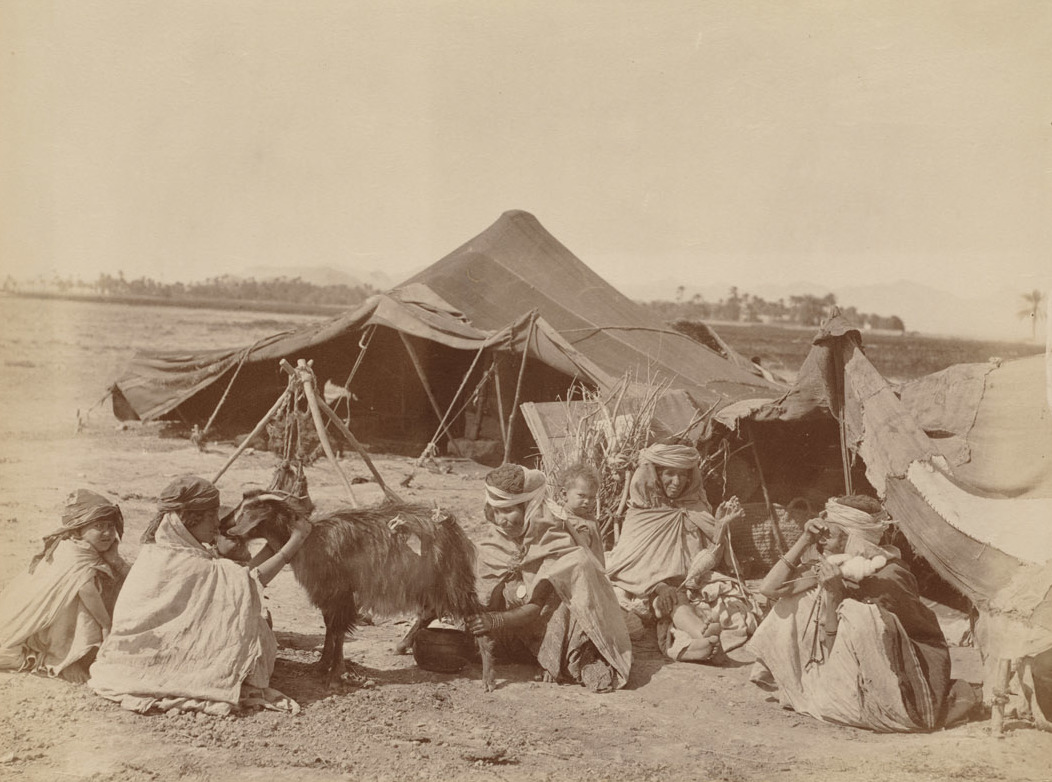
A Bedouin camp in 1958.

Abdullah reappears in the series' nineteenth album, The Red Sea Sharks, in 1958. Emir Ben Kalish Ezab, under threat of insurrection, takes him away from the Khemed and sends him to Marlinspike Hall, where he is placed under the care of Tintin and Haddock. Tintin and Haddock learn of this by surprise when they return from the cinema: not only has the young prince been playing practical jokes to the detriment of his guests, but he has also brought his entourage, who have set up their Bedouin camp in the castle's grand salon. Exasperated, Tintin and Haddock agree to return to Khemed to escape the young prince's misdeeds.

Remaining in Marlinspike, Abdullah makes little appearance in the rest of the album, but Tintin and the Captain hear from him through Nestor and Professor Calculus, who testify on the suffering he inflicts on them. When the adventure comes to an end and the heroes return to the castle, the young prince has finally made his way back, but not without leaving a farewell message for the Captain, as well as a firecracker on his armchair. Nestor, exhausted by the rascal's stay, appears very thin.

Abdullah is also mentioned in Destination Moon and Tintin in Tibet, and was due to appear in Tintin and the Alph-Art, an unfinished album following Hergé's death in 1983.

== Analysis ==
=== An irresponsible and disrespectful character ===
Comics historian Thierry Groensteen describes the character of Abdullah as "possessed by the demon of practical jokes" and sees him as a symbol of anarchy, in a kind of " essence of disrespect and childish irresponsibility." The young boy takes nothing and no one seriously, and his captivity in Tintin in the Land of Black Gold is ultimately just a game.

As Renaud Nattiez points out, while there are many child characters in the series, Abdullah is "the only one [...] to arouse impatience and even relative violence on the part of Tintin", who ends up spanking him when the boy refuses to follow him to escape from Doctor Müller's lair. What's more, Captain Haddock is irritated by the young boy's unruly and obnoxious behavior, and "agrees to join the Khemed to escape the unbearable closeness with the rascal". In this sense, he joins the character of Jolyon Wagg in the category of "unwelcome guests", which is particularly evident at the start of The Red Sea Sharks, where "his bad manners, his insolence and his numerous entourage are a veritable tribe of invaders installed in the grand salon of Marlinspike." According to Cristina Álvares, professor of literature at the University of Minho, "the intrusion into Marlinspike of intractable characters like Abdullah, Jolyon and the Castafiore [all] shatter the domestic sphere and make it uninhabitable."

=== Abdullah or a father's helplessness ===
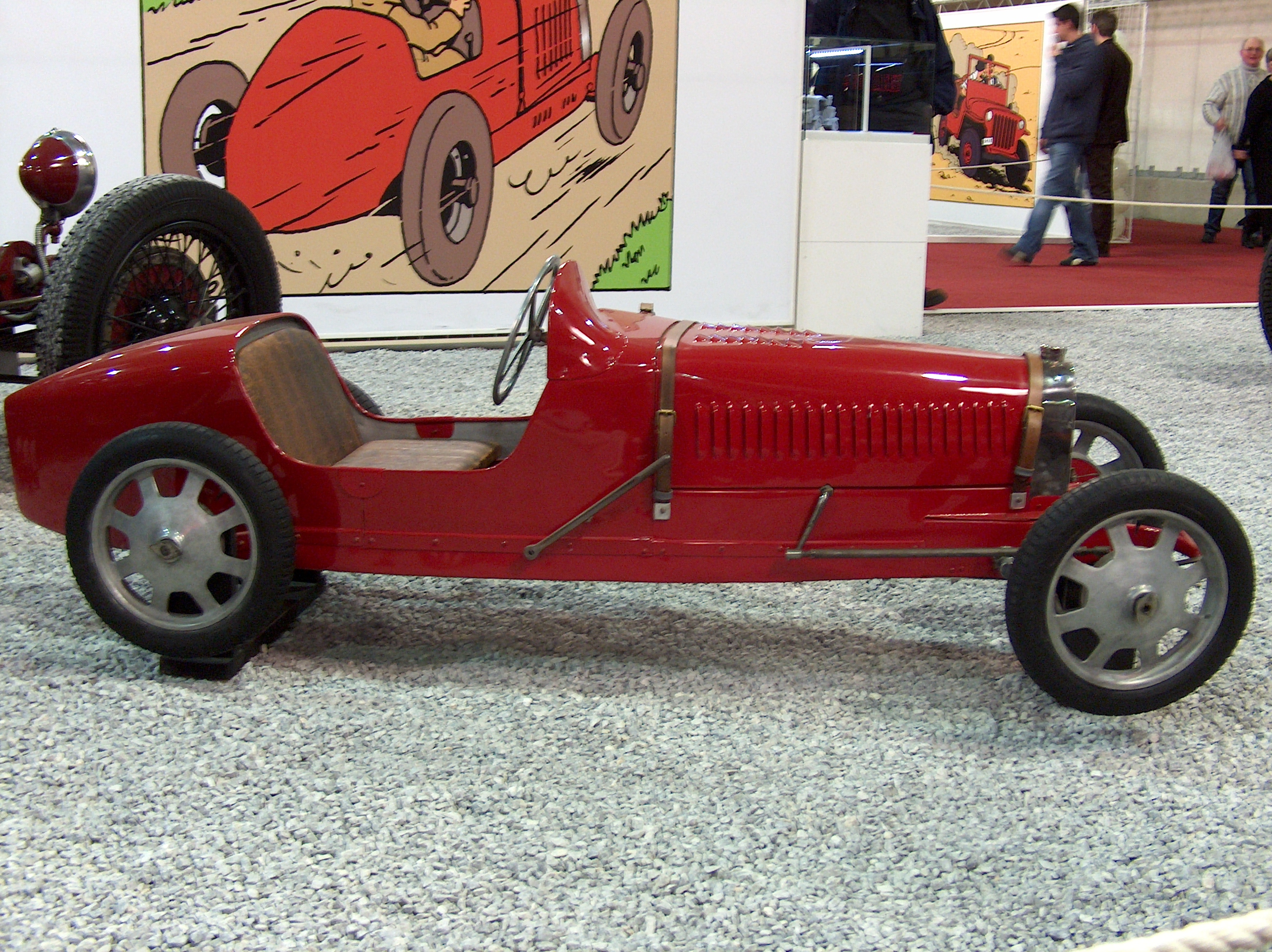
The Bugatti Type 52 offered by the Emir to Abdullah.

Despite his many pranks, his father never withdrew his affection for him, covering him with gifts and glowing superlatives. The gleaming Bugatti Type 52 he gives him for his 6th birthday is testimony to his excess. Abdullah is above all a spoiled child whose every whim is granted and, as such, he symbolizes the child king who is none other than the "revealer of his father's weakness." In fact, the Emir is incapable of establishing his authority over his own son, a veritable "prince of treachery and cunning". Through Abdullah's character and his father's powerlessness, Hergé conveys a vision of the Middle East that was widespread in Europe in the mid-20th century, presenting the region as a politically unstable zone, marked by coups d'état and assassinations, where the weakness of power gives way to trafficking of all kinds.

But for historian Mathieu Bouchard, the study of the image of the Middle East in Tintin must be complemented by a study of its reception, since most readers read the albums not in the historical context in which they were produced, but in the context in which they are read. Thus, in 2004, three years after the September 11th attacks, Belgian writer Thomas Gunzig declared: "The memory of the infamous Abdullah came back to me years later [...]. I remember telling myself, in front of the images of fire and dust, that it was a trick of his own, that with age he'd swapped the water pistol and the itching powder for airplanes, that Captain Haddock hadn't stuck him with enough solid ones." In his Petit dictionnaire énervé de Tintin, Albert Algoud, who describes Abdullah as "the archetypal capricious brat, the insufferable kid who pushes adults to their limits", ironically likens him to a terrorist friend of Osama bin Laden.

=== Abdullah's pranks, an element of Hergéan comedy ===
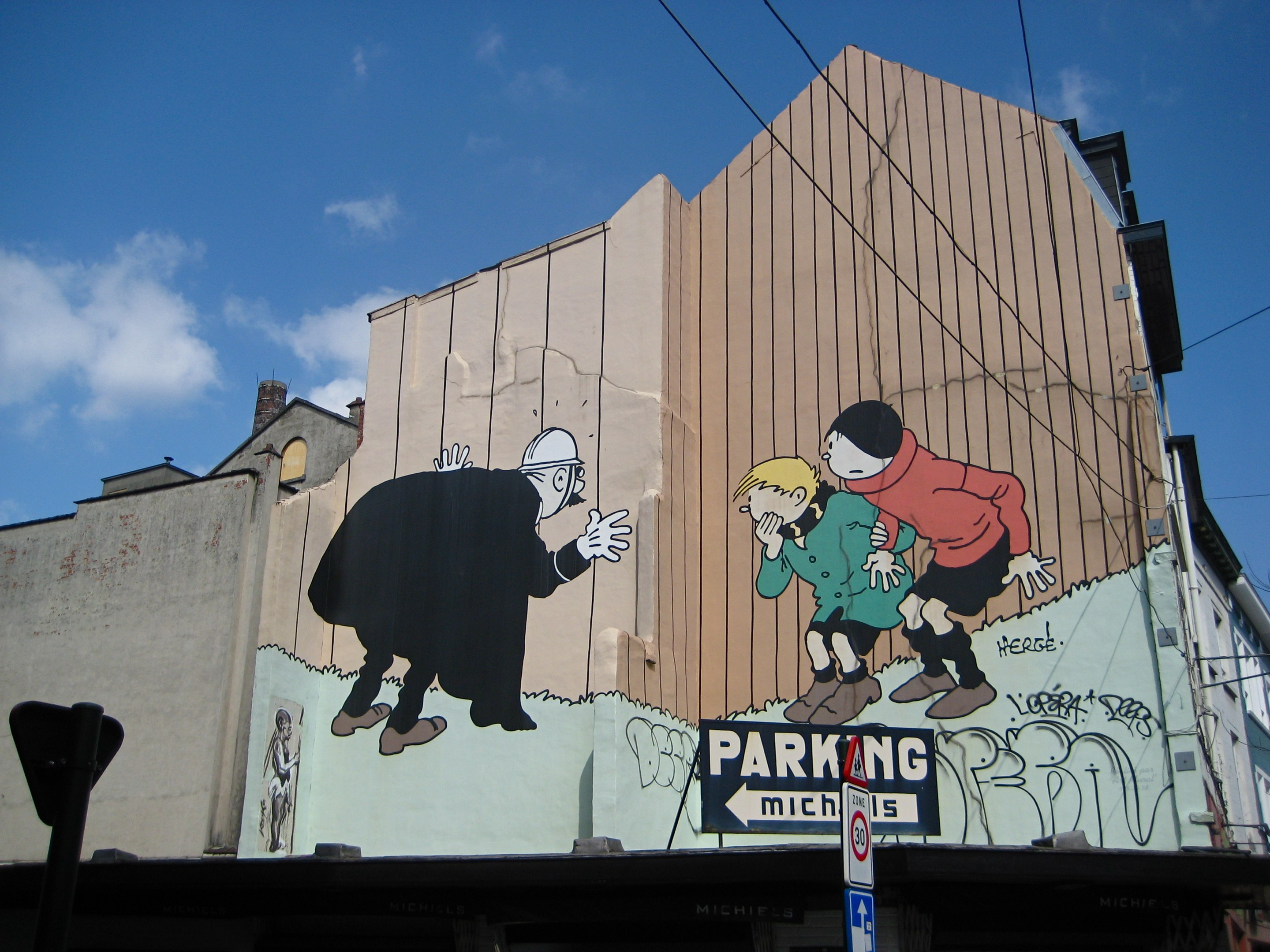
Quick and Flupke, other prankster children from Hergé's universe.

Like other secondary characters in the series, such as Thomson and Thompson and Jolyon Wagg, Abdullah immediately makes entertaining the scenes in which he takes part. Comics historian Thierry Groensteen calls them the "clan des fâcheux" (clan of the annoying), as each of them, in their own way, forms a comic pairing with Captain Haddock, the favorite target of mischief in this "one-man joke store." What these colorful characters have in common is a strong personality, imprinted in the reader's memory from the moment they first appear. But whereas Hergé's great comic figures often make us laugh in spite of ourselves, Abdullah's pranks are systematically mean.

With each appearance of the young boy, the cartoonist multiplies the gags, most often inspired by burlesque classics, such as the bucket of water placed at the top of a half-open door, which the captain receives on the head as he enters the castle in The Red Sea Sharks. The mechanism of laughter works all the better when the victim is surprised by the prank, while the reader is more often than not prepared for the gag. Hergé also reuses certain gags from his other series, Quick and Flupke.

The Emir's very attitude towards his son is part of the character's comic element. His affection for his son, and the many affectionate nicknames he uses to refer to him, are matched by the various insults and torments he promises to inflict on his enemies. The captain's turnarounds follow a similar pattern, when he calls him a "real devil", yet is ready to be softened by any sign of affection he receives from the young boy.

=== The place of children in Hergé's universe ===
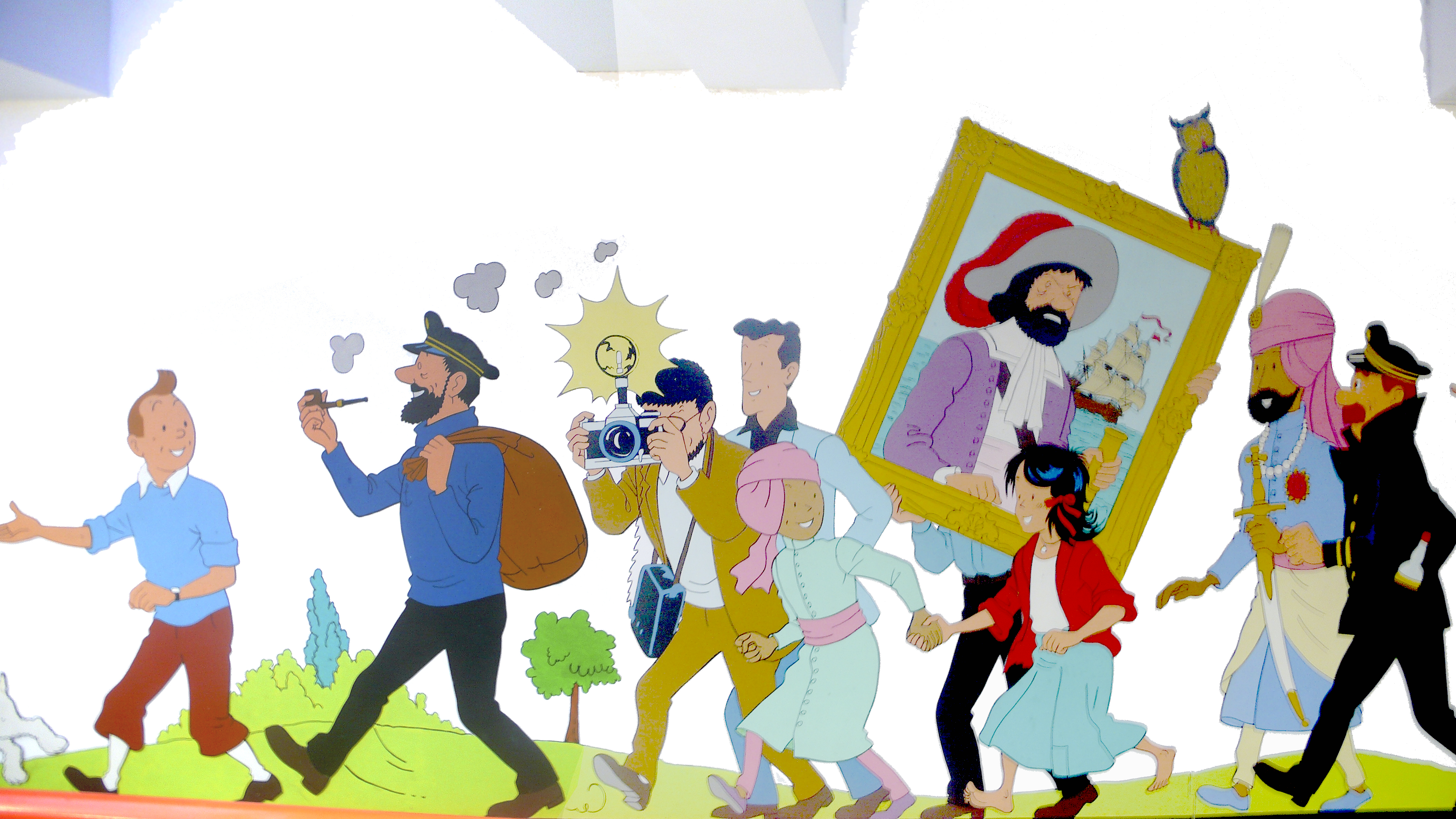
Like the son of the Maharaja of Gaipajama and Miarka (in the center of the picture), Abdullah is a child abruptly separated from his parents.

Psychoanalyst Serge Tisseron explains the presence of numerous children's characters in The Adventures of Tintin by the need for young readers to identify with them. For him, these children's characters are "the indispensable link between all the generations present in Tintin." In his eyes, Abdullah embodies the "dirty kid", while Zorrino (Prisoners of the Sun) represents the child ready to sacrifice himself. Serge Tisseron considers that these childlike figures can be found in certain adult characters created by Hergé, and in this respect, he likens Abdullah to the billionaire Laszlo Carreidas in Flight 714 to Sydney.

According to the hypothesis of Pierre Assouline, one of Hergé's biographers, the presence of numerous children's characters in the series can also be explained by the cartoonist's inability to have one himself.

On another note, the theme of children abruptly separated from their parents is recurrent in the Adventures of Tintin. In addition to Abdullah, kidnapped in Land of Black Gold, this is the case of the son of the Maharajah of Gaipajama in Cigars of the Pharaoh, of Tchang in The Blue Lotus, of Zorrino in Prisoners of the Sun and of Miarka in The Castafiore Emerald. According to Cristina Álvares, these missing children "enclave a small family drama in the Tintin adventure. Tintin's action consists in returning the kidnapped son to his father, or simply helping the little gypsy girl lost in the woods to find her parents. In other words, Tintin, who has no family of his own, acts to rebuild one. His action stems from the friendship that links him directly to the anguished father, not to the child. [...] The traumatic weight of separation is drastically reduced, as the lost minor is quickly recovered and reintegrated into the domestic sphere, to the family's great delight. As an object taken from the family and returned to it, none of these children becomes a hero, i.e. a subject of adventure."

== Interpretation and posterity ==
In the 1991 animated TV series The Aventures of Tintin, a collaboration between the French studio Ellipse and the Canadian animation company Nelvana, the character of Abdullah is played by actress Sophie Arthuys.

The character of Abdullah, although secondary in The Aventures of Tintin, has become part of popular culture. In December 2007, on the occasion of Libyan leader Muammar Gaddafi's visit to Paris, Le Monde journalist Dominique Dhombres referred to him in his article Le petit Abdullah campe à Moulinsart (Little Abdullah camps at Marlinspike Hall), drawing a parallel between the installation of a Bedouin tent on the lawn of the Hôtel de Marigny at the request of the Libyan head of state, and that of the Bedouins in the grand salon of the Marlinspike Hall in The Red Sea Sharks.

== See also ==
- List of The Adventures of Tintin characters
- Albert Algoud
