= Explorers on the Moon =

Comic album by Belgian cartoonist Hergé

Explorers on the Moon (On a marché sur la Lune)
- Cover of the English edition
- Date: 1954
- Series: The Adventures of Tintin
- Publisher: Casterman

Creative team
- Creator: Hergé

Original publication
- Published in: Tintin magazine
- Date of publication: 29 Oct 1952 – 29 Dec 1953
- Language: French

Translation
- Publisher: Methuen
- Date: 1959
- Translator: Leslie Lonsdale-Cooper; Michael Turner

Chronology
- Preceded by: Destination Moon (1953)
- Followed by: The Calculus Affair (1956)

Explorers on the Moon (French: On a marché sur la Lune; literally: We walked on the Moon) is the seventeenth volume of The Adventures of Tintin, the comics series by Belgian cartoonist Hergé. The story was serialised weekly in Belgium's Tintin magazine from October 1952 to December 1953 before being published in a collected volume by Casterman in 1954. Completing a story arc begun in the preceding volume, Destination Moon (1953), the narrative tells of the young reporter Tintin, his dog Snowy, and friends Captain Haddock, Professor Calculus, and Thomson and Thompson who are aboard humanity's first crewed rocket mission to the Moon.

Developed in part through the suggestions of Hergé's friends Bernard Heuvelmans and Jacques Van Melkebeke, Explorers on the Moon was produced following Hergé's extensive research into the possibility of human space travel – a feat that had yet to be achieved – with the cartoonist seeking for the work to be as realistic as possible. Hergé continued The Adventures of Tintin with The Calculus Affair, while the series itself became a defining part of the Franco-Belgian comics tradition. Critics have held the illustrative detail of the book in high regard, but have expressed divided opinions of the story; some consider it to be among the most mature and emotionally resonant entries in the series, while others fault it for downplaying the humour seen in previous volumes in favour of the scientific focus of the narrative. The story was adapted for the 1957 Belvision animated series Hergé's Adventures of Tintin, the 1989 computer game Tintin on the Moon, the 1991 Ellipse/Nelvana animated series The Adventures of Tintin, and the 1992-3 BBC Radio 5 dramatisation of the Adventures.

== Synopsis ==
The synopsis continues a plot begun in Destination Moon.

Professor Calculus, Tintin, Snowy, Captain Haddock, and Calculus's assistant Frank Wolff are aboard an atomic rocket-powered spacecraft leaving the Earth bound for the Moon. Soon after takeoff they discover that the detectives Thomson and Thompson have accidentally stowed away on board, thinking the launch was set for 1:34 P.M., and not A.M., putting a strain on the oxygen supply.

The detectives accidentally turn off the nuclear motor, disrupting the artificial gravity and sending everyone floating until Tintin corrects the problem. They then suffer a relapse of the Formula 14 drug (seen in Land of Black Gold), resulting in their hair growing rapidly in multiple colours, until Calculus subsequently administers a cure. Haddock, who has smuggled whisky aboard the rocket, gets drunk and takes an impromptu spacewalk, during which he briefly becomes a satellite of the asteroid Adonis, but Tintin is able to rescue him.

The rocket lands in the Hipparchus Crater, with Tintin being the first human to step on the Moon. Next day, Calculus and Wolff set up optical instruments to begin observational work on the Moon while Tintin and Haddock build the Moon tank. Two days later, Haddock, Wolff and Tintin take the Moon tank to explore some stalactite caves in the direction of the Ptolemaeus Crater; inside a cave Snowy slips into an ice-covered chasm, but Tintin rescues him.

Later aboard the ship, Tintin is ambushed and left bound in the hold by a third stowaway, Colonel Jorgen, a spy who had been smuggled aboard by Wolff, who has been blackmailed by a foreign power for which Jorgen works and Snowy's leg gets injured while being ambushed by Jorgen. As a first-aider, Tintin finally places the bandages around Snowy's injured leg to heal completely. With Wolff's help, Jorgen seeks to hijack the ship and return it to Earth, but Tintin escapes and foils him through emergency sabotage that cuts power to the engine.

Due to the strain on the oxygen supplies, the crew decides to abandon the Moon tank and the optical instruments and to cut short the lunar stay. The repair work is completed slightly ahead of schedule, and the rocket is cleared for lift-off. After launch, Jorgen escapes his bonds due to the detectives' bungling and tries to kill Tintin and the others with a gun; Wolff seeks to prevent him, and in their struggle over the gun, Jorgen is shot through his heart, killing him. When it is revealed that there will not be enough oxygen aboard for the crew to survive the journey, Wolff sacrifices himself by opening the airlock and floating out into space to his death. Upon approaching Earth, the crew falls unconscious, but Tintin wakes long enough to set the rocket to auto-pilot and it arrives back in Syldavia safely. After landing, the crew is rescued in the nick of time. During the heroes' welcome home party, Calculus hopes they may return to the Moon someday, but Haddock refuses, revealing that the expedition has taught him that "Man's proper place is on dear old Earth".

== History ==
=== Background ===
Hergé first devised the idea of sending Tintin on a mission to the Moon while he was working on Prisoners of the Sun (1949). His decision to move into the field of science fiction might have been influenced by his friendly rivalry with his colleague Edgar P. Jacobs, who had recently had success with his own science fiction comic The Secret of the Swordfish (1950–53). He decided that it would be a two-volume story arc, as had proved successful with his earlier arcs, Cigars of the Pharaoh (1934) and The Blue Lotus (1936), The Secret of the Unicorn (1943) and Red Rackham's Treasure (1944), and The Seven Crystal Balls (1948) and Prisoners of the Sun. He had initially intended on beginning this story after the culmination of Prisoners of the Sun, but both his wife Germaine Remi and his close friend Marcel Dehaye convinced him to proceed with Land of Black Gold (1950), a story that he had previously left unfinished, instead.

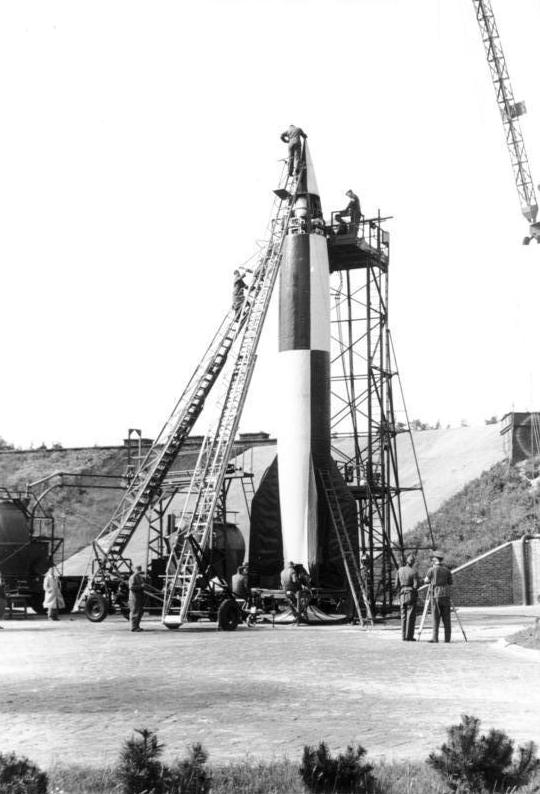
A German V-2 rocket being tested in 1942. The V-2 would serve as a major inspiration for Hergé in his work on both Destination Moon and Explorers on the Moon.

Seeking advice on the story, Hergé consulted his friend Bernard Heuvelmans, who had authored the non-fiction book L'Homme parmi les étoiles ("Man Among the Stars") (1944). In autumn 1947, Heuvelmans and Jacques Van Melkebeke developed a script for the story, which they gave to Hergé. This version based Calculus' lunar expedition in a fictional location, Radio City, in the United States. It featured a return of Professor Decimus Phostle, a character who had previously appeared in The Shooting Star (1942), but this time as an antagonist; Phostle had sold the secrets of the mission in order to attain funds to buy a diamond for the actress Rita Hayworth. In early 1948, Hergé produced two black-and-white pages of this version of the story before abandoning it. Hergé retained some elements of this original script in his finished version, namely the scenes in which Captain Haddock drinks whiskey in a gravity-free environment and that in which he goes for a space walk and nearly becomes a satellite of Adonis, which appear on pages 5 and 8 of Explorers on the Moon.

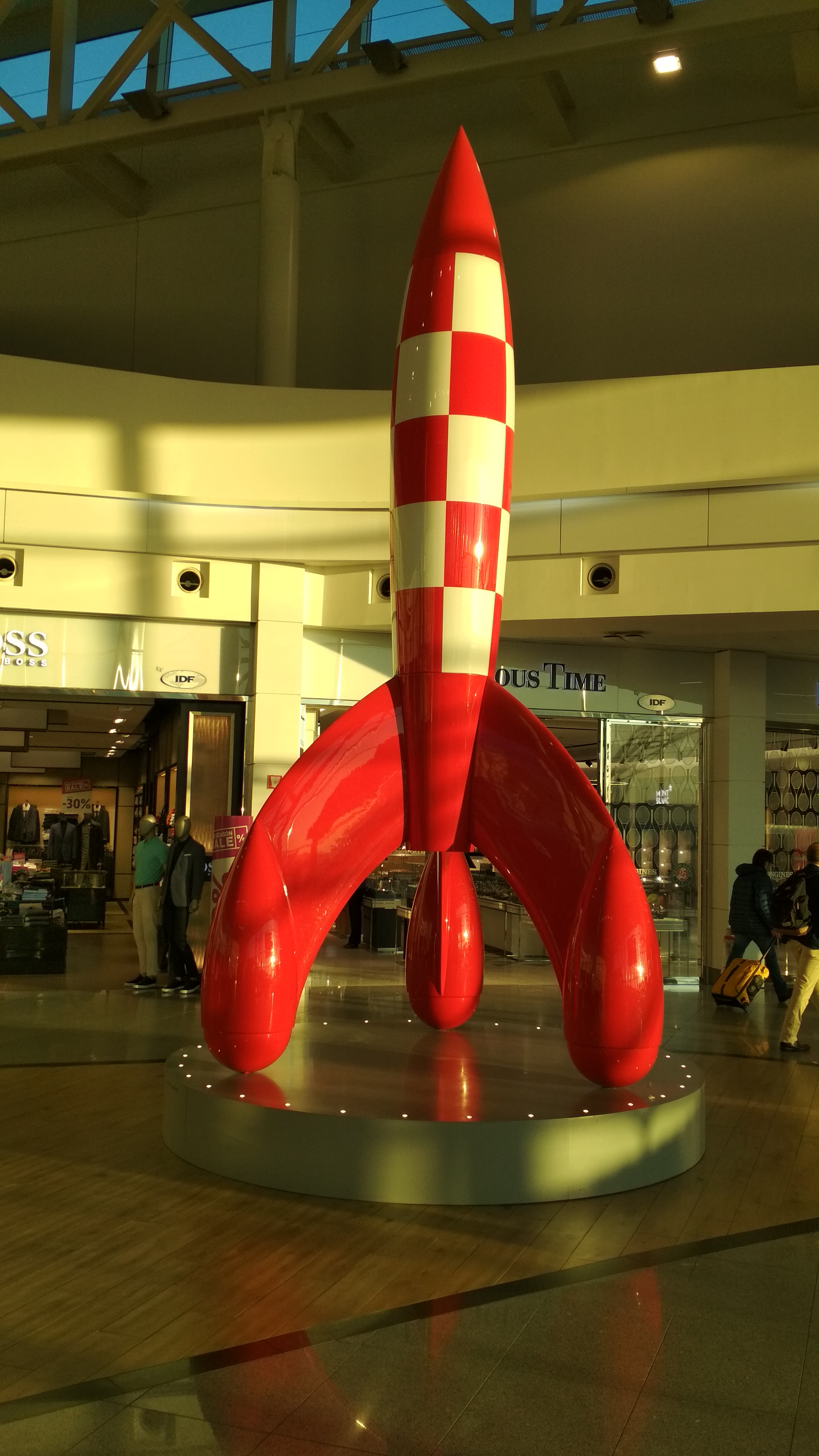
A model of the rocket at Brussels Airport

Nevertheless, Heuvelmans thought his influence on the story to be more significant, stating that "in going through the two books we [he and Van Melkebeke] really had the impression that it was what we had originally done at the beginning. In broad outline, that was it".

Hergé hoped for the story to be as realistic as possible, and sought to eschew fantastical elements. In his own words, it contained "no moonmen, no monsters, no incredible surprises". To ensure this realism, he collected a wide range of documents about rockets and space travel with which to conduct research. In this he was aided by Heuvelmans, who collected pictures of rockets and atomic research facilities for him. Hergé's research archive included an article from the American magazine Collier's which discussed how humanity could reach the Moon, as well as books by Pierre Rousseau and Auguste Piccard. A further work that he used was L'Astronautique (1950), a book on putative space travel by the physicist Alexander Ananoff, with whom Hergé began a correspondence in April 1950. He also visited the Ateliers de Constructions Electriques de Charleroi's Center for Atomic Research, striking up a subsequent correspondence with its director, Max Hoyaux. Hergé incorporated much of this technical information into the story, but juxtaposed it with moments of humour to make it more accessible to his young readership.

According to literary critics Jean-Marc Lofficier and Randy Lofficier, possible fictional influences on Hergé's story include Jules Verne's 1870 novel Around the Moon and the 1950 American film Destination Moon. Hergé was certainly inspired by a number of photographic stills from the Destination Moon film which had been published. The computer system at the Sprodj space centre was visually based upon the UNIVAC I, the first computer to be created for non-military purposes. Hergé based his Moon rocket on the designs of the V-2 rocket which had been developed by Nazi scientists during World War II. The red-and-white checker pattern on Hergé's rocket was based upon an illustration of a V-2 which Hergé had come upon in Leslie Simon's 1947 book German Research in World War II. He commissioned the construction of a model rocket with detachable parts from his assistant Arthur Van Noeyen. He took the model to Paris where he showed it to Ananoff, asking him if it was a realistic representation of what a Moon rocket might look like. He and his assistants then used the model from which to accurately sketch when producing the comic. Hergé introduced into the story the character of Boris Jorgen, who had previously appeared as an antagonist in King Ottokar's Sceptre (1939). He added evidence for water on the Moon on the advice of Heuvelmans.

=== Publication ===
On 7 September 1950, Hergé broke off the story with the statement "end of part one". He felt the need for a break from work, having fallen back into clinical depression. He and his wife Germaine went on holiday to Gland in Switzerland, before returning to Brussels in late September. Many readers sent letters to Tintin magazine asking why Explorers on the Moon was no longer being serialised, with a rumour emerging that Hergé had died. On 18 April 1951, he published an open letter in the magazine explaining his absence as a result of illness caused by exhaustion and included an illustration of himself sprawled out on an armchair. As Hergé planned his return to work, covers of Tintin magazine announced the imminent return of the story.

Explorers on the Moon would resume after an eighteen-month hiatus, returning in the 9 April 1952 issue, accompanied with a summary of the story so far. Its final installment appeared on 31 December 1953.

=== Republication ===
Upon the serial's publication, Hergé faced criticism for including Wolff's suicide in the story; suicide was widely viewed as a sin in Catholic-dominated Belgium. In deference to these critics, for the published book version he added Wolff's line of "perhaps by some miracle I shall escape too", to make the scene seem a less obvious suicide. Years later, Hergé expressed regret that he had capitulated on this issue, as he felt that the change was "stupid" as Wolff knew that he was "condemned" the moment he jumped into space and no miracle was possible. The story was collected together and published by Editions Casterman as On a Marché Sur La Lune in 1954. Casterman were unhappy with this title, which translates as "We Walked on the Moon", but Hergé resolutely refused to make a change.

== Critical analysis ==
Jean-Marc Lofficier and Randy Lofficier believed that the two-part story "belongs" to Calculus as his "cosmic vision moves the story forward". They further expressed the opinion that Wolff was a unique character in the Adventures of Tintin, suggesting that he is akin to a character from a John le Carré novel. Referring specifically to Explorers on the Moon, they opined that it was "a true epic of the human imagination", believing that its depiction of the Moon has "withstood the test of time" more than other "proto-space exploration novels". They felt that the Moon adventure was "Hergé at his best... a triumphant achievement on every level", awarding both halves of the story five stars out of five.

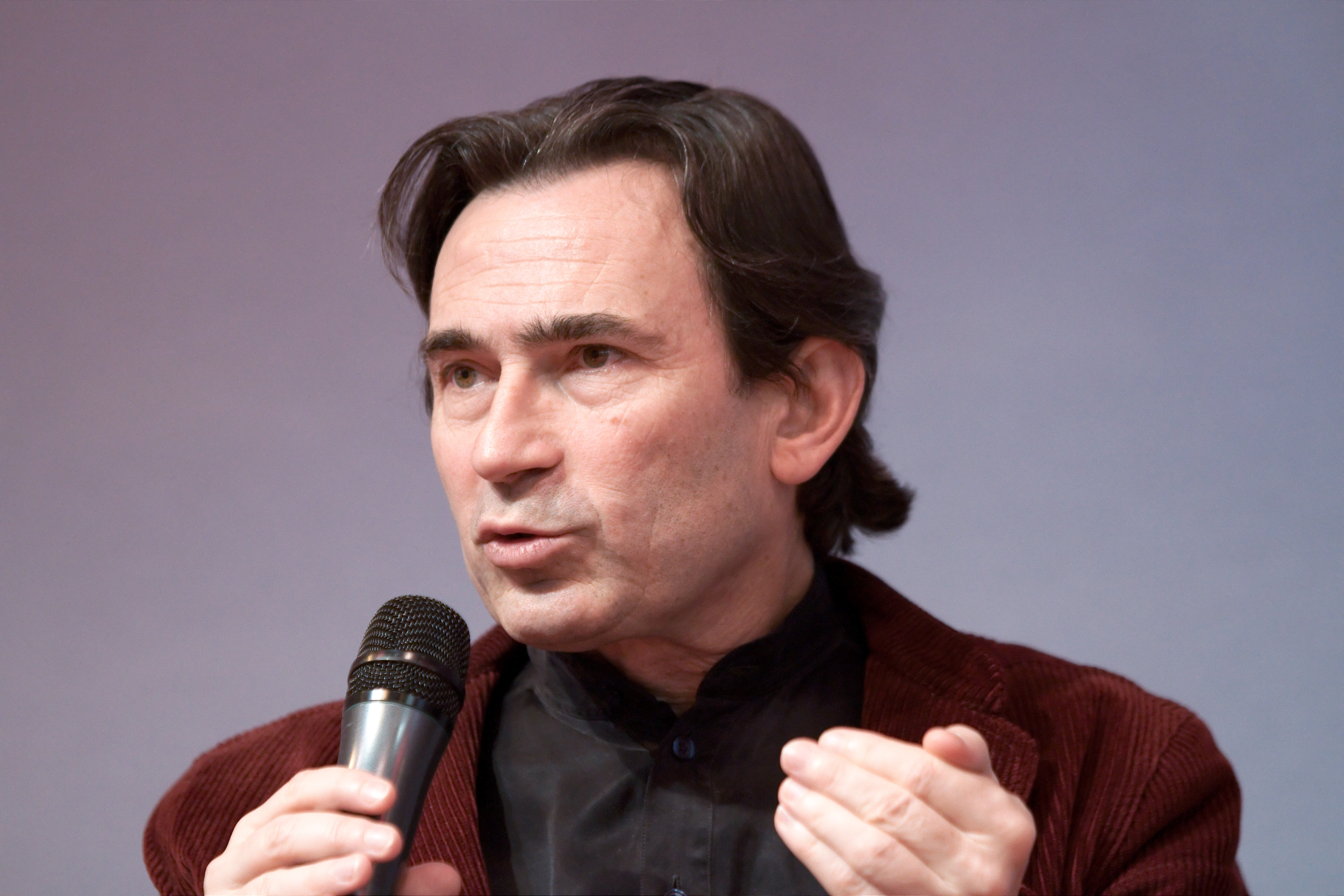
Hergé biographer Benoît Peeters (pictured, 2010) felt that Wolff's character brought "a tragic note" to the story.

Hergé biographer Pierre Assouline felt that the two Moon adventures "mark a stage in the development of Hergé's work". Hergé biographer Benoît Peeters praised the "gradual introduction into the story of a real dimension of evil" as being something particularly effective. He also expressed the view that Wolff brings "a tragic note" to the story, comparing him to the characters in the stories of Graham Greene. He was critical of the two-part story arc, stating that they had "neither the liveliness and dynamism" of The Secret of the Unicorn and Red Rackham's Treasure, "nor the supernatural quality" of The Seven Crystal Balls-Prisoners of the Sun.

Harry Thompson noted that Explorers on the Moon was widely regarded as Hergé's "greatest artistic achievement", describing the entire Moon adventure as "a technical masterpiece" as a result of its "uncannily accurate" depiction of the Moon. Thompson expressed his opinion that Explorers could be compared to the work of science-fiction writers Jules Verne and H. G. Wells. Focusing on the scene in which the Thom(p)sons' hair grows rapidly in bright colours, he stated that it provides an abrupt contrast with "the almost scholastic nature of the rest of the story", and that it "injects a few bright splashes" into an otherwise "carefully restrained colour scheme". Philippe Goddin praised the depiction of the rocket's landing as "a magnificent spectacle, well worth the double space spread given by Hergé", also highlighting what he perceived as the ending's "unprecedented dramatic tension".

In his psychoanalytical study of the Adventures of Tintin, the literary critic Jean-Marie Apostolidès praised the Destination Moon-Explorers on the Moon story arc for its "meticulous attention to scientific facts", but added that this had also resulted in the story's "rather pedagogical tone". He added that in these stories, the main division was "no longer Good and Evil" as it had been in previous Adventures, but "Truth and Error". Apostolidès opined that despite being a "fussy and somewhat ridiculous character", through his scientific achievements Calculus grows to the "stature of a giant" in this arc, eclipsing Sir Francis Haddock (from The Secret of the Unicorn) as the series' "founding ancestor". He goes on to claim that in becoming the "sacred ancestor", the voyage to the Moon becomes "a mystical quest" with science as its guiding religion. Drawing comparisons between this arc and the Prisoners of the Sun story, he drew symbolic links between the scientific centre and the Inca Temple of the Sun, but noted that here Calculus was the "high priest" rather than the sacrificial victim as he had been in the previous story. Moving on to discuss the Moon rocket in these stories, Apostolidès described it as a phallic object which penetrated the "virgin territory" of the Moon. At the same time, he described the rocket as a "maternal belly" in which the space explorers slept. Commenting specifically on Explorers on the Moon he commented that the protagonists of the story reverted to childhood when exploring the Moon, believing that they had treated it like a theme park.

Literary critic Tom McCarthy stated that in the Destination Moon-Explorers of the Moon story arc, Calculus "embodies Hergé's... own wartime position, spun out into a post-war environment", representing a genius driven by his work whose activities are coincidental to national and political causes. He suggested that Explorers on the Moon was "perhaps both the most wildly adventurous and the most contemplative" instalment in the series. He felt that the inclusion of Jorgen being smuggled aboard the rocket as a stowaway reflected the idea of the "stranger" penetrating the "home", something which he thought was present in other Adventures. Commenting on the scene in which Haddock smuggles a whisky bottle inside the Guide to Astronomy, he states "the text, in this case, is hollow, smuggling something else", which he believed was a reversal of the appearance of a parchment hidden within a model ship in The Secret of the Unicorn.

== Adaptation ==
In 1957, the animation company Belvision Studios produced a string of colour adaptations based on Hergé's original comics, adapting eight of the Adventures into a series of daily five-minute episodes. Explorers on the Moon was the second to be adapted in the second animated series; it was directed by Ray Goossens and written by Greg, a well-known cartoonist who was to become editor-in-chief of Tintin magazine.

In 1991, a second animated series based upon The Adventures of Tintin was produced, this time as a collaboration between the French studio Ellipse and the Canadian animation company Nelvana. Explorers on the Moon was the fifteenth story to be adapted and was divided into two twenty-minute episodes. Directed by Stéphane Bernasconi, the series has been praised for being "generally faithful" to the original comics, to the extent that the animation was directly adopted from Hergé's original panels.
