= Type 52 =

Type 52 may refer to:

- Bugatti Type 52, motor vehicle produced by the auto-maker Bugatti
- Bristol Type 52 Bullfinch, an experimental British military aircraft first flown in 1922
- Type 052 destroyer, a destroyer class of the People's Liberation Army Navy
- Type 052B destroyer, a destroyer class of the People's Liberation Army Navy
- Type 052C destroyer, a destroyer class of the People's Liberation Army Navy
- Type 052D destroyer, a destroyer class of the People's Liberation Army Navy
- Type 52, 75 mm caliber recoilless rifle
