= Albert Algoud =

French humorist

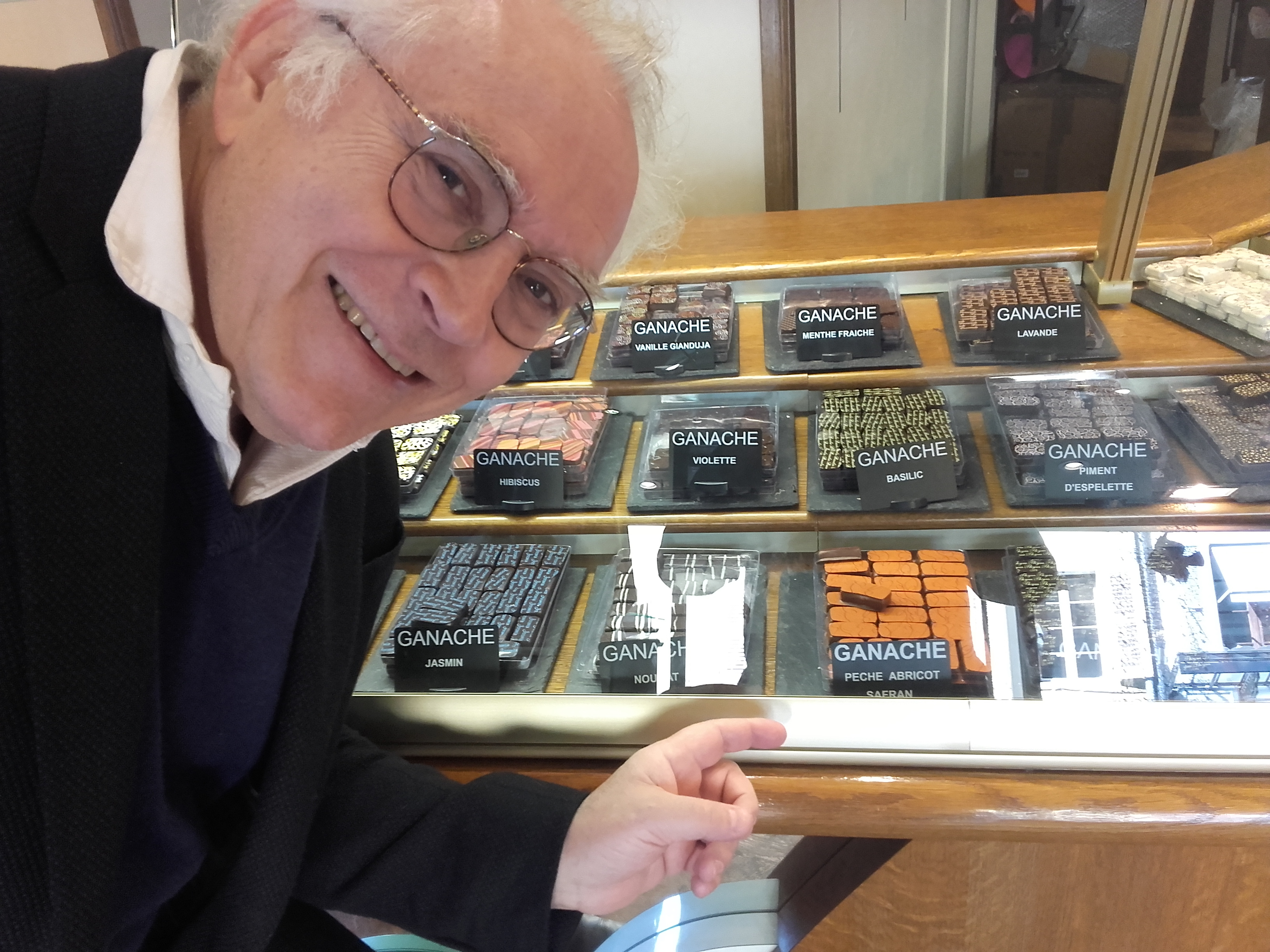
- Born: March 23, 1950 (age 75); Asnières-sur-Seine, France
- Occupations: Comedian; journalist; actor; writer
- Organization: Fluide Glacial (chief editor 2003-2005) Le Canard enchaîné
- Father: François-Marie Algoud

Albert Algoud (born March 23, 1950) is a French humorist known for his sketches on several Canal+ programs (Nulle part ailleurs, and the Karl Zéro shows) and on the radio. He has also published books on Tintin.

== Biography ==
Albert Algoud is the son of writer François-Marie Algoud and the grandson of author Albert Algoud. According to the January 1995 issue of L'Histoire, Albert Algoud was himself a member of Action Française in his youth. He then spent a few months with the Gauche prolétarienne, a movement he soon left because he disagreed with Marxist–Leninist ideology and Stalinist tendencies.

In the 1970s and 1980s, he was a contributor to the libertarian and surrealist magazines La Crécelle noire and Camouflage.

He worked as a French teacher, first in Haute-Savoie, in Seynod, then at Les Allobroges college in La Roche-sur-Foron, and finally in the Yvelines, at Jean Jaurès college in Poissy. He began broadcasting on Contrebande in Annecy. In 1989, he spent several months hosting a comedy radio show on RFM with Antoine de Caunes and Karl Zéro (Ba be bi bo bu). On this show, with Karl Zéro, he played several characters, including Barry White.

He was a member of the group Les Jalons.

In Nulle part ailleurs (NPA), he was one of a group of comedians who filmed Karl Zéro's sketches, writing the former's scripts with Antoine de Caunes and Laurent Chalumeau. On the set of NPA, he played the legionnaire Pintimbert alongside Karl Zéro. Following Antoine de Caunes's departure, Algoud was given the show's finale, where he read the eulogy of the day's guest. For two seasons, he contributed to the weather, disguised as grotesque characters (the Queen Mother, Rika, Father Albert, Marshal Ganache...).

With Christophe Bertin, he helped create the news pastiche Zérorama, broadcast from January 3, 1994. He then appeared on Karl Zéro's satirical news program Le Vrai Journal. On France Inter radio, Algoud hosted La partie continue a cultural magazine show in the 6 pm – 7 pm slot between 1999 and June 28, 2002. In 2005 and 2006, he had a daily column on the RTL2 morning show, alongside Alexandre Devoise.

Albert Algoud, also a Tintinophile, has published numerous works dedicated to the world of Tintin. These include a dictionary of Captain Haddock's swear words and an unauthorized biography of Castafiore. In 2010, he published the Petit dictionnaire énervé de Tintin, and in 2016 the Dictionnaire amoureux de Tintin.

From 2003 to September 2005, he was editor-in-chief of Fluide glacial magazine.

He also writes columns for I-Télé, contributes to the "Le coincoin des variétés" column in Le Canard enchaîné, and writes for the weekly magazine À nous Paris, as well as the comic strip magazine Cargo Zone. He is also a scriptwriter/dialoguist on several films, including Les Hauts Murs directed by Christian Faure; Gérard Oury's Le Schpountz; Laurent Heynemann's Un aller simple and Didier Bourdon's Bambou.

From September 2007 to December 2007, he hosted the daily program On aura tout vu on Direct 8 every evening at 6 p.m., with Stéphanie Pillonca, Louise Ekland and Fréderic Martin, reviewing cultural news.

In 2008 and 2009, he was co-author with Éric Laugérias and Laurent Gerra, then in 2010–2011 and 2011–2012, with Pascal Fioretto, of Laurent Gerra's daily column, commenting on current affairs from Monday to Friday, on RTL, between 8:50 and 9 am. Algoud pastiche the voices of Chinese President Hu Jintao and Russian President Vladimir Putin, as well as Osama bin Laden.

On France Inter's Le Fou du roi, he takes part on certain days in Daniel Morin's column as "le père Albert". In September 2011, he joined Daniel Morin's team in La Morinade, broadcast on Le Mouv'. He regularly plays various roles. The show was discontinued by the new management of Le Mouv' in December 2013. The character of "Père Albert" reappears alongside Daniel Morin in À rebrousse poil, the program the latter presents every day at 11 a.m. on France Inter, during the summer of 2015.

From 2015 to 2020, he appeared twice weekly on La Bande originale, Nagui's show on France Inter, with a humor column entitled "Albert Algoud a tout compris", where he alternated between his recurring characters who had moved from one show to the next: Father Albert (a cantankerous priest with a Savoyard accent), Marshal Ganache (a former Indo soldier and Petainist), François-François (a glittering singer), John-Jack Lang (the other guy's brother), Jean-Dominique Besnehard (speech therapist to the stars), Jean-Roger Navarro, Jean-Philippe Manœuvre...

In 2019, he has a column, entitled "Il était une femme", on Daniel Morin's weekly program Vous les femmes. In it, Albert Algoud presents a woman who has performed an exceptional or heroic deed, but whom history has forgotten.

In 2023, Albert Algoud's autobiographical comic strip Le Prof qui a sauvé sa vie (The Teacher Who Saved His Life), illustrated by Florence Cestac, was published by Dargaud, recounting his past as a teacher.

== Works ==
=== On The Adventures of Tintin ===
- Tintinolâtrie, Casterman, 1987
- Le Haddock illustré, dictionnaire des insultes du capitaine Haddock, Casterman, 1991 - revised edition 2004
- Le Tournesol illustré, Casterman, 1993
- Le Dupondt sans peine, Canal + Éditions, 1997
- L'Archipel Tintin, Les Impressions Nouvelles, 2004 - new edition 2012 In collaboration with Jean-Marie Apostolidès, Dominique Cerbelaud, Benoît Peeters, Pierre Sterckx.
- La Castafiore, biographie non autorisée, éditions Chiflet & Cie, 2006 (ISBN 2-35164-006-3)
- Petit dictionnaire énervé de Tintin, coll. Petit dictionnaire énervé, éditions Opportun, 2010
- Dictionnaire amoureux de Tintin, Plon, 2016
- Le Senhor Oliveira da Figueira et les aventures de Hergé et Tim-Tim au Portugal, Chandeigne, 2021

=== With Antoine de Caunes ===
- Pas mal pour un lundi, 1990
- Vous permettez que je vous appelle Raymond?, 1990
- J'aime beaucoup ce que vous faites, 1992
- Une ambulance peut en cacher une autre, 1992
- Bien entendu, je plaisante, 1993
- Le Petit Gildas illustré, 1993

=== Karl Zéro ===
- Lettres piégées, Hors Collection, 1992
- L'Élu de mon cœur, Hors Collection, 1992

=== Alexandre Devoise ===
- Le Fin Mot de l'Histoire, City Éditions, 2005

=== Pascal Fioretto ===
In 2007, Albert Algoud and Pascal Fioretto drew two gentle caricatures of Nicolas Sarkozy and Ségolène Royal, both candidates in the 2007 French presidential election.

- Le Pacte secret, a novel about the presidency of the French Republic for over a century, 2007
- Élysée machine, Chiflet & Ci.e., 2007

=== Comics ===
- Où est Sarko? (dessins Herlé) éditions de l'opportun, 2011
- Le Prof qui a sauvé sa vie (dessins Cestac), éditions Dargaud, 2023

=== Others ===
- Œil de verre, jambe de bois: Petite Encyclopédie des éclopés, 1992
- In Bed Wiz François François, 1992
- Le Retour de Tartarin, 1993
- Raffarin de Matignon (2002) avec Christophe Bertin
- Comment gagner sa vie sur celle des autres: Do It Your Secte, avec Christophe Bertin et Cabu, 2002
- Jacno, itinéraire du dandy pop, entretiens avec la collaboration d’Albert Algoud, coll. SL, Éditions du Rocher, 2006
- Journal intime de Nicolas S.: 1998-2008, éditions Chiflet & Cie, Paris, mai 2008, 159 p. (ISBN 978-2351640517) – Faux journal intime de Nicolas Sarkozy, à vocation parodique, entièrement manuscrit.
- Carnet de retraite (2008) éditions Chiflet & Ci.e., octobre 2008 48 p. (ISBN 978-2-35164-060-9)
- Bonnes manières (d'hier et d'aujourd'hui) - Quand la Baronne va au supermarché, 2013, éditions Chiflet & Cie, 160 p. (ISBN 978-2-35164-203-0)
- Madame Doubtfire (2003): a play written by Albert Algoud and directed by Daniel Roussel was released in 2003, with Michel Leeb in the lead role.

Algoud wrote chapters for Secrets d'Histoire vol. 1 and 2 by Stéphane Bern (Albin Michel).

== Filmography ==
=== As a screenwriter ===
- 1999: Le Schpountz, Gérard Oury
- 2001: Un aller simple, Laurent Heynemann
- 2008: Les Hauts Murs, Christian Faure
- 2009: Bambou, Didier Bourdon

== See also ==
- Fluide Glacial
- Le Canard enchaîné
- Abdullah (Tintin)
