= The Adventures of Tintin (TV series) =

Animated television series

- Genre: Action; Adventure; Mystery; Comedy drama
- Based on: Characters by Hergé
- Developed by: Stéphane Bernasconi
- Voices of: Colin O'Meara; David Fox; Wayne Robson; John Stocker; Dan Hennessey; Susan Roman
- Theme music composer: Ray Parker; Tom Szczesniak
- Composers: Ray Parker; Jim Morgan; Tom Szczesniak
- Countries of origin: France; Canada
- Original language: English
- No. of seasons: 3
- No. of episodes: 39 (13 in each season)

Production
- Executive producers: Michael Hirsh; Patrick Loubert; Clive A. Smith; Phillipe Gildas; Pierre Bertrand-Jaume; Simon Hart
- Producer: Robert Rea
- Running time: 22 minutes (approx. per episode)
- Production companies: Nelvana; Ellipse Programme

Original release
- Network: FR3/France 3 (France); Global Television Network (Canada); HBO (United States)
- Release: 2 October 1991 – 28 September 1992

The Adventures of Tintin is an animated television series co-produced and animated by French animation studio Ellipse Programme and Canadian studio Nelvana. The series is based on the comic book series of the same name by Belgian cartoonist Hergé (French pronunciation: [ɛʁʒe]). 39 half-hour episodes were produced over the course of three seasons, originally airing in France, Canada and the United States between 1991 and 1992. Beginning in 1992, the series was syndicated to various other countries, including the United Kingdom, Australia, South Africa, Poland, the Czech Republic, Brazil and Indonesia.

== History ==
The television series was directed by French director Stéphane Bernasconi, with Peter Hudecki as the Canadian unit director. Hudecki was the primary director but could not be credited due to co-production restrictions. It was produced by Ellipse (France) and Nelvana (Canada) on behalf of the Hergé Foundation. The series' writers included Toby Mullally, Eric Rondeaux, Martin Brossolet, Amelie Aubert, Dennise Fordham, and Alex Boon. It was the second television adaptation of Hergé's books, following the Belgian animation company Belvision's Hergé's Adventures of Tintin.

== Production ==
The series used traditional animation techniques and adheres closely to the original books, going so far as to transpose some frames from the original books directly to the screen. In the episodes "Destination Moon" and "Explorers on the Moon", 3-D animation was used for the moon rocket – an unusual step in 1991. Each frame of the animation was then printed and recopied onto celluloid, hand painted in gouache, and then laid onto a painted background.

Artistically, the series chose a consistent style, unlike in the books. In the books, the images had been drawn over the course of 47 years, during which Hergé's style developed considerably. However, later televised episodes, such as the "Moon" stories and "Tintin in America", clearly demonstrate the artists' development throughout the production of the television series. The series' original production language was English, but all visuals (road signs, posters, and settings) remained in French. Backgrounds in the show were more detailed and more cinematic shots were featured than in the original books.

== Reception ==
Along with fans, critics have praised the series for being "generally faithful" to the originals, with compositions having been actually taken directly from the panels in the original comic books.

== Hergé's cameo appearances ==
Hergé, the creator of Tintin, makes cameo appearances reminiscent of Stan Lee and Alfred Hitchcock in each episode of the cartoon series, as he often did in the original books. Most of the time, he is just a passing figure in the street, such as when he is a passerby checking his watch in "The Blue Lotus", a reporter in "The Broken Ear", or a technician in "Explorers on the Moon". His letterbox can be seen next to Tintin in "The Crab with the Golden Claws". He also appeared as a gangster in "Tintin in America" and an asylum inmate at the in "Cigars of the Pharaoh", along with his fellow artist and collaborator Edgar P. Jacobs.

== Music ==
The underscore music and the main title theme for the series were written by Ray Parker and Tom Szczesniak, and recorded by engineer James Morgan. Excerpts from the score were released by Le Studio Ellipse on CD and cassette in conjunction with Universal Music Group on the StudioCanal label. It is now out of print in both formats.

== Releases ==
=== Online platforms ===
Since its remastering into 1080p widescreen high definition, Amazon Prime and Netflix have both made the series available in certain territories.

=== Home video ===
In 2012, Shout Factory released all 3 seasons of the show on DVD.

== Voice artists ==
=== English (The Adventures of Tintin) ===
- Colin O'Meara as Tintin, Herbert Dawes, J.M. Dawson, Fred (The Black Island) Lieutenant Kavitch, additional voices
- Susan Roman as Snowy
- David Fox as Captain Haddock, Sir Francis Haddock, additional voices
- Wayne Robson as Professor Cuthbert Calculus, Dr. Sarcophagus, additional voices.
- John Stocker as Thompson, Jumbo, Yamato, additional voices
- Dan Hennessey as Thomson, Rastapopoulos, Tom (Karaboudjan) additional voices
- Maureen Forrester as Bianca Castafiore
- Vernon Chapman as Nestor
- Denis Akiyama as Mitsuhirato, General Haranochi, Bunji Kuraki, Tharkey
- Harvey Atkin as Emir Mohammed Ben Kalish Ezab
- Ho Chow as Mr. Li, Cheng Li-Kin
- Keith Knight as Gustav Bird, Mr. Crabtree, additional voices
- Julie Lemieux as Chang Chong-Chen
- Peter Meech as Radio Announcer
- Chris Wiggins as Wang Chen-Yee
- Peter Wildman as Hector and Alfred Alembick

Additional voices were provided by:

- Yank Azman
- Barbara Budd
- Robert Cait
- Graeme Campbell
- Liz Dufresne
- Paul Haddad
- Graham Haley
- Keith Hampshire
- David Huband
- Marvin Ishmael
- Tom Kneebone
- Michael Lamport
- Ray Landry
- Neil Munro
- Frank Perry
- Frank Proctor
- Mario Romano
- Ron Rubin
- August Schellenberg

=== French (Les Aventures de Tintin) ===
- Thierry Wermuth as Tintin
- Susan Roman as Milou
- Christian Pelissier as Capitaine Haddock
- Henri Labussiere as Professeur Tryphon Tournesol
- Yves Barsacq as Dupont, Wronzoff, Ivan Ivanovitch Sakharine, Mohammed Ben Kalish Ezab, Ridgewell, Wang Jen-Ghié, le colonel Alvarez, le professeur Philémon Siclone, le docteur Rotule, le Grand Précieux, Calys, Kronick, Gino the photographer, additional voices
- Jean-Pierre Moulin as Dupond, le maharadjah de Rawhajpoutalah, Muskar XII, Chaubet, Boris, Sanders, Philippulus le prophète, Manolo, le photographe japonais, Bohlwinkel, Miller, Walther (voix 1), Jean-Loup de la Batellerie, additional voices
- Michel Ruhl as Nestor, le professeur Hornet, Walther (voix 2), additional voices
- Marie Vincent as Bianca Castafiore
- Michel Gudin as le général Alcazar
- Serge Sauvion as Rastapopoulos
- Marc Moro as Allan Thompson, Maxime Loiseau, le colonel Jorgen, le colonel Sponsz, Ranko, Pedro, Al Capone, Dawson, Ramon Bada, Bab El Ehr, Hippolyte Calys, Hippolyte Bergamotte, Chiquito, Huascar, Barnabé, Pablo, Hans Boehm, Paolo Colombani, Gino the pilot, Yamato, le général Haranochi, Ivan, Zlop, Himmerszeck, Ragdalam, Isidore Boullu, Matéo, additional voices
- Michel Tureau as Müller, Szut, Bobby Smiles, Rackham le Rouge, Mitsuhirato, Baxter, Igor Wagner, Gustave Loiseau, Aristide Filoselle, Nestor Halambique, Alfred Halambique, Marc Charlet, Tharkey, Kavitch, le docteur Krollspell, Tom, lieutenant Delcourt, Walter Rizotto, le fakir, le docteur Finney, Alfredo Topolino, Walter, additional voices
- Henri Lambert as Frank Wolff, le Grand Inca, Sirov, le général Tapioca, Alonzo Perez, le professeur Cantonneau, Mac O'Connor, Foudre Bénie, Spalding, Stephan, Kurt, Mik Ezdanitoff, Herbert Dawes, additional voices
- David Lesser as Tchang Tchong-Jen
- Serge Lhorca as Oliveira da Figueira
- Sophie Arthuys as Abdallah, Irma, le fils du maharadjah de Rawhajpoutalah
- Patricia Legrand as Zorrino, Lobsang
- Jean-Pierre Leroux as Bunji Kuraki, Omar Ben Salaad
- Georges Berthomieu as Séraphin Lampion
- William Coryn as Didi
- Daniel Brémont as Laszlo Carreidas

== Episodes ==
Running order of the TV series as per original broadcast schedule.

=== Season 1 ===
No.	Title	Directed by	Written by	Storyboard by
1–2	"The Crab with the Golden Claws"	Stéphane Bernasconi	J. D. Smith, Robert Rea and Christophe Poujol	Stéphane Bernasconi
3–4	"The Secret of the Unicorn"	Stéphane Bernasconi	Christophe Poujol	Bernard Deyries
5	"Red Rackham's Treasure"	Stéphane Bernasconi	Alex Boon	Francois Hemmen
6–7	"Cigars of the Pharaoh"	Stéphane Bernasconi	Aaron Barzman	Christian Choquet
8–9	"The Blue Lotus"	Stéphane Bernasconi	Laurel L. Russwurm and Robert Rea	Raymond Jafelice and Gilles Cazaux
10–11	"The Black Island"	Stéphane Bernasconi	Peter Meech	Christian Choquet and Bernard Deyries
12–13	"The Calculus Affair"	Stéphane Bernasconi	Toby Mullally and Eric Rondeaux	Pascal Morelli

=== Season 2 ===
No.	Title	Directed by	Written by	Storyboard by
1	"The Shooting Star"	Stéphane Bernasconi	Peter Meech, J. D. Smith and Robert Rea	Raymond Jafelice, Stéphane Bernasconi and Franck Ekinci
2–3	"The Broken Ear"	Stéphane Bernasconi	Alex Boon, J. D. Smith and Robert Rea	Raymond Jafelice and Jean-Charles Finck
4–5	"King Ottokar's Sceptre"	Stéphane Bernasconi	E. Shipley Turner, Martin Brossollet and Robert Rea	Raymond Jafelice and Gilles Cazaux
6–7	"Tintin in Tibet"	Stéphane Bernasconi	Bruce Robb and Christophe Poujol	Raymond Jafelice, Franck Ekinci and Damien Millereau
8–9	"Tintin and the Picaros"	Stéphane Bernasconi	Bruce Robb and Amelie Aubert	Jean-Charles Finck
10–11	"Land of Black Gold"	Stéphane Bernasconi	Dennise Fordham and Eric Rondeaux	Raymond Jafelice, Damien Millereau and Philippe Fernandez
12–13	"Flight 714"	Stéphane Bernasconi	David P. Scherer and Eric Rondeaux	Raymond Jafelice, Philippe Fernandez and Damien Millereau

=== Season 3 ===
No.	Title	Directed by	Written by	Storyboard by
1–2	"The Red Sea Sharks"	Stéphane Bernasconi	Christophe Poujol	Jean-Charles Finck
3–4	"The Seven Crystal Balls"	Stéphane Bernasconi	Eric Rondeaux and Robert Rea	Damien Millereau
5–6	"Prisoners of the Sun"	Stéphane Bernasconi	Christophe Poujol	Frank Nissen
7–8	"The Castafiore Emerald"	Stéphane Bernasconi	Eric Rondeaux and Martin Brossollet	Gilles Cazaux
9–10	"Destination Moon"	Stéphane Bernasconi	Eric Rondeaux and Christophe Poujol	Damien Millereau
11–12	"Explorers on the Moon"	Stéphane Bernasconi	Christophe Poujol	Gilles Cazaux
13	"Tintin in America"	Stéphane Bernasconi	Eric Rondeaux and Robert Rea	Stéphane Bernasconi

== See also ==
- List of French animated television series
- The Adventures of Tintin: The Secret of the Unicorn
- Blake and Mortimer
