= Tintin on the Moon =

1987 video game

- MS-DOS title screen (CGA graphics)
- Developer: Probe Entertainment
- Publisher: Infogrames
- Programmer: Daniel Charpy; Philippe Nottoli
- Composer: Jeroen Tel (C64)
- Platforms: Amiga, Amstrad CPC, Atari ST, Commodore 64, MS-DOS, ZX Spectrum
- Release: 1987; 1989
- Genre: Action
- Mode: Single-player

Tintin on the Moon (French: Tintin Sur La Lune) is a video game published by Infogrames. It is loosely based on the Destination Moon and Explorers on the Moon comic books from The Adventures of Tintin, the series by Belgian cartoonist Hergé. It is a first person shoot 'em up/side scroller and the first Tintin video game.

== Summary ==
This video game was originally made by Infogrames for various home platforms in 1987 and was converted to DOS by Probe Entertainment in 1989. The game's storyline is based loosely on the plot of the Destination Moon and Explorers on the Moon comics from the series. The object of the game is to land on the Moon while avoiding asteroids and thwarting enemies within the rocket.

Tintin on the Moon was the first PC game based on The Adventures of Tintin. A Master System version was announced, but never released.

== Reception ==
Upon release, the game received mixed reviews, and although it was praised for accurately portraying Hergé's art style, it was criticized for its uninspired, repetitive gameplay. Your Sinclair's David Wilson gave it an 80% rating in his review, describing it as "very slick and colorful", but noting the small amount of content the game provides, and that it doesn't offer much of a challenge.

Reception

Review scores
Publication	Score
Your Sinclair	80%
Zzap!64	64%
