= Le schpountz =

- Directed by: Gérard Oury
- Written by: Novel: Marcel Pagnol; Screenplay: Albert Algoud; Gérard Oury
- Produced by: Alain Poiré
- Starring: Smain; Sabine Azema; Ticky Holgado; Annie Grégorio; Martin Lamotte; Carole Franck; Frédéric Bouraly; Jean Dell; Jean-Marie Winling
- Cinematography: François Lartigue
- Edited by: Catherine Kelber
- Music by: Vladimir Cosma
- Production company: Gaumont
- Distributed by: Gaumont Buena Vista International
- Release date: 25 August 1999
- Running time: 84 minutes
- Country: France
- Language: French
- Budget: $6.4 million
- Box office: $1.5 million

Le schpountz is a 1999 French film directed by Gérard Oury (a remake of the 1938 film Le Schpountz by Marcel Pagnol). Irénée does not want to work in his uncle's grocery shop and spends his time dreaming of becoming an actor. Irénée's chance comes when a crew of movie makers came to his little village. Irénée begins to go overboard to get noticed, which earns him the traditional joke reserved to a "schpountz" (naive person): a phoney contract and a departure for Paris.
