= Destination Moon (comics) =

Comic album by Belgian cartoonist Hergé

Destination Moon (Objectif Lune)
- Cover of the English edition
- Date: 1953
- Series: The Adventures of Tintin
- Publisher: Casterman

Creative team
- Creator: Hergé

Original publication
- Published in: Tintin magazine
- Date of publication: 30 March 1950 – 7 September 1950; 9 April 1952 – 22 October 1952
- Language: French

Translation
- Publisher: Methuen
- Date: 1959
- Translator: Leslie Lonsdale-Cooper; Michael Turner

Chronology
- Preceded by: Land of Black Gold (1950)
- Followed by: Explorers on the Moon (1954)

Destination Moon (French: Objectif Lune) is the sixteenth volume of The Adventures of Tintin, the comics series by Belgian cartoonist Hergé. The story was initially serialised weekly in Belgium's Tintin magazine from March to September 1950 and April to October 1952 before being published in a collected volume by Casterman in 1953. The plot tells of young reporter Tintin and his friend Captain Haddock who receive an invitation from Professor Calculus to come to Syldavia, where Calculus is working on a top-secret project in a secure government facility to plan a crewed mission to the Moon.

Developed in part through the suggestions of Hergé's friends Bernard Heuvelmans and Jacques Van Melkebeke, Destination Moon was produced following Hergé's extensive research into the possibility of human space travel – a feat that had yet to be achieved – with the cartoonist seeking the work to be as realistic as possible. During the story's serialisation, Hergé established Studios Hergé, a Brussels-based team of cartoonists to aid him on the project. Hergé concluded the story arc beginning in this volume with Explorers on the Moon, while the series itself became a defining part of the Franco-Belgian comics tradition. Critics have held the illustrative detail of the book in high esteem, but have expressed divided opinions of the story; some consider it to be among the most mature and emotionally resonant entries in the series, while others fault it for downplaying the humour seen in previous volumes in favour of the scientific focus of the narrative. The story was adapted for the 1957 Belvision animated series Hergé's Adventures of Tintin, the 1989 computer game Tintin on the Moon, the 1991 Ellipse/Nelvana animated series The Adventures of Tintin, and the 1992–93 BBC Radio 5 dramatisation of the Adventures.

== Synopsis ==
Tintin, Snowy, and Captain Haddock travel to Syldavia to join Professor Calculus, who has been commissioned by the Syldavian government to secretly build a spacecraft that will fly to the Moon. Arriving at the Sprodj Atomic Research Centre, they meet the Centre's managing director, Mr. Baxter, and Calculus' assistant, the engineer Frank Wolff. After witnessing Calculus test a new multiplex helmet (a fictionalized Plexiglass) for the planned mission, they are informed both of his plan and of his new use of an ear trumpet owing to his signature hearing ailments. Haddock is against the plan, but Calculus, accidentally swapping Haddock's pipe for the ear trumpet, believes instead that he agreed; later, Haddock accidentally almost burns the ear trumpet mistaking it for his pipe.

An uncrewed sub-scale prototype of the rocket – the "X-FLR6" – is launched on a circumlunar mission to photograph the far side of the Moon and test Calculus's nuclear rocket engine. Before the launch, the Centre's radar picks up a plane which drops three paratroopers near to the centre. One of the men dies from a malfunctioning parachute; the incident coincides with the arrival of the police detectives Thomson and Thompson, who are initially believed to be the intruders.

Tintin sets out to locate the spies, telling Haddock to follow from the base, as he suspects a mole is on the inside. Wolff follows Haddock out of suspicion. Tintin catches one of the paratroopers during an exchange at an air vent, but is shot by the other before he is able to do anything. Simultaneously, the base experiences a temporary power outage, and confusion ensues, with neither Haddock (who passed out) nor Wolff (who was grabbed by the detectives) capable of explaining clearly what happened.

This incident confirms the Centre's suspicions that the paratroopers were agents of a foreign power, but Tintin fears that efforts to trace any leaked information would be futile. The rocket is successfully launched and orbits the Moon as planned, but on its return it is intercepted by the aforementioned foreign power, who have used the leaked information concerning the rocket's radio control. However, Tintin had anticipated this and had asked Calculus to rig a self-destruct mechanism for the rocket; the Centre is thus able to destroy the rocket to prevent it from falling into enemy hands. Tintin reasons that there must have been an inside spy who leaked information to the paratroopers, but no suspects are found.

Preparations are made for the crewed expedition to the moon. Calculus is infuriated when Haddock accuses him of "acting the goat" and gives his friends a forced tour of the Moon rocket. However, after telling the Captain to look where he's going ("Stars above, Captain! Behind you!"), Calculus forgets to look where he is going, falls down a ladder, and suffers amnesia. When Calculus' memory fails to return, Haddock proposes a violent shock as a solution, but his increasingly insane attempts repeatedly backfire. Eventually, after repeating the phrase "you can keep acting the goat as long as you like", Haddock successfully, though accidentally, triggers Calculus' memory recovery.

Calculus is able to complete construction of the rocket and final preparations are made, with Calculus obtaining a proper hearing aid for near-perfect hearing of transmission signals. On the night of the launch, Haddock initially backs out, but after hearing Thomson and Thompson stating that he would be too old to go, he angrily declares his participation. The crew finally board the rocket, and later lose consciousness as the rocket successfully takes off due to the sudden g-force. Despite attempting to make contact, the ground crew are unable to get through, and the book ends with the rocket flying towards the Moon while the ground crew repeatedly calls, "Earth calling Moon Rocket, are you receiving me?".

== History ==
=== Background ===
Hergé first devised the idea of sending Tintin on a mission to the Moon while he was working on Prisoners of the Sun (1949). His decision to move into the field of science fiction might have been influenced by his friendly rivalry with his colleague Edgar P. Jacobs, who had recently had success with his own science fiction comic, The Secret of the Swordfish (1950–1953). He decided that it would be a two-volume story arc, as had proved successful with his earlier arcs, The Secret of the Unicorn (1943) and Red Rackham's Treasure (1944), and The Seven Crystal Balls (1948) and Prisoners of the Sun. He had initially intended on beginning this story after the culmination of Prisoners of the Sun, but both his wife Germaine Remi and his close friend Marcel Dehaye convinced him to proceed with Land of Black Gold (1950), a story that he had previously left unfinished, instead.

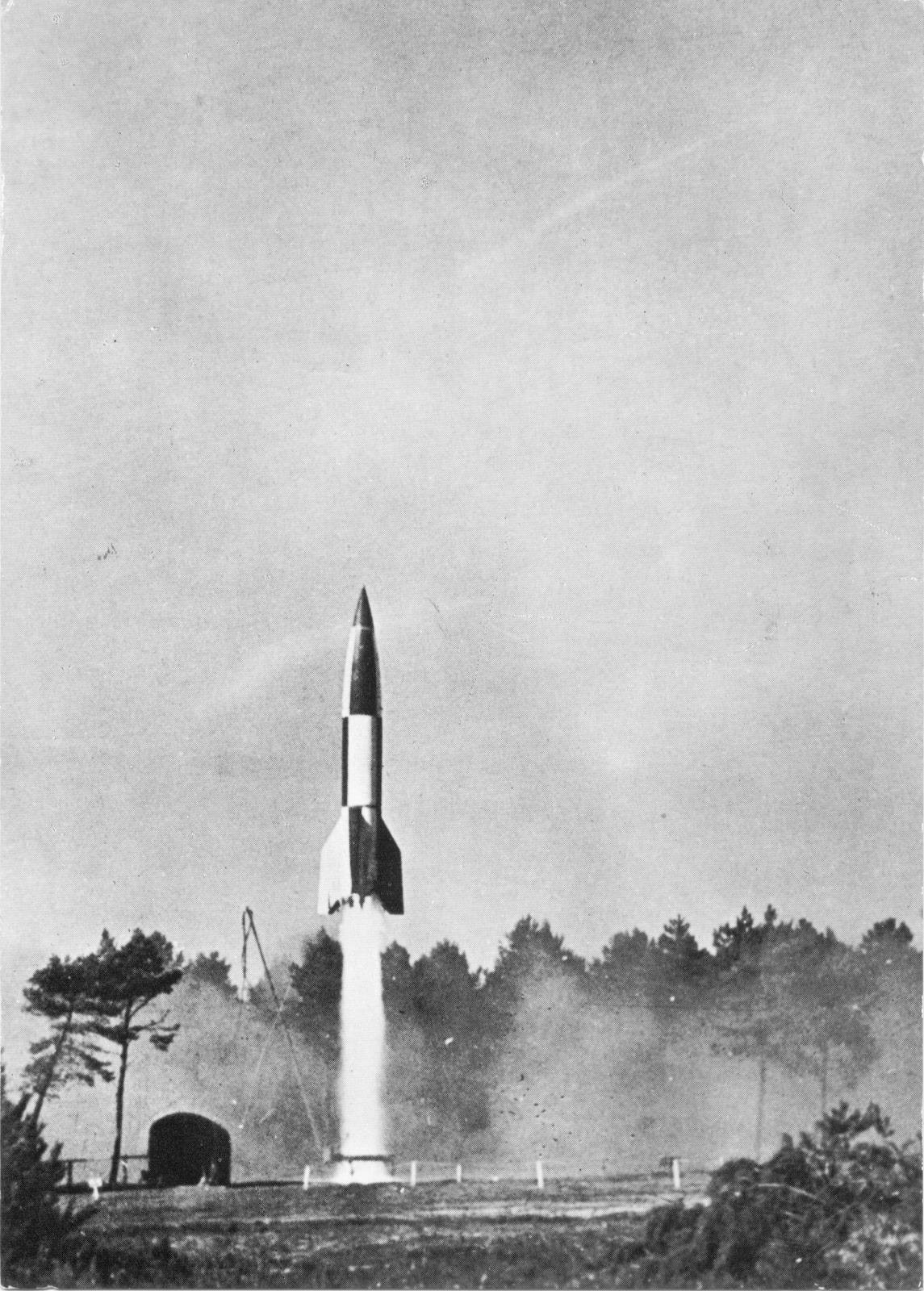
A Nazi German V-2 rocket being launched in 1945. The V-2 would serve as a major inspiration for Hergé in his work on both Destination Moon and Explorers on the Moon.

Seeking advice on the story, Hergé consulted his friend Bernard Heuvelmans, who had authored the non-fiction book L'Homme parmi les étoiles ("Man Among the Stars") (1944). In autumn 1947, Heuvelmans and Jacques Van Melkebeke developed a script for the story, which they gave to Hergé. This version based Calculus' lunar expedition in a fictional location, Radio City, in the United States. It featured a return of Professor Decimus Phostle, a character who had previously appeared in The Shooting Star (1942), but this time as an antagonist; Phostle had sold the secrets of the mission in order to attain funds to buy a diamond for the actress Rita Hayworth. In early 1948, Hergé produced two black-and-white pages of this version of the story before abandoning it. Hergé retained some elements of this original script in his finished version, namely the scenes in which Haddock drinks whiskey in a gravity-free environment and that in which Haddock goes for a space walk and nearly becomes a satellite of Adonis, which appear on pages 5 and 8 of Explorers on the Moon.

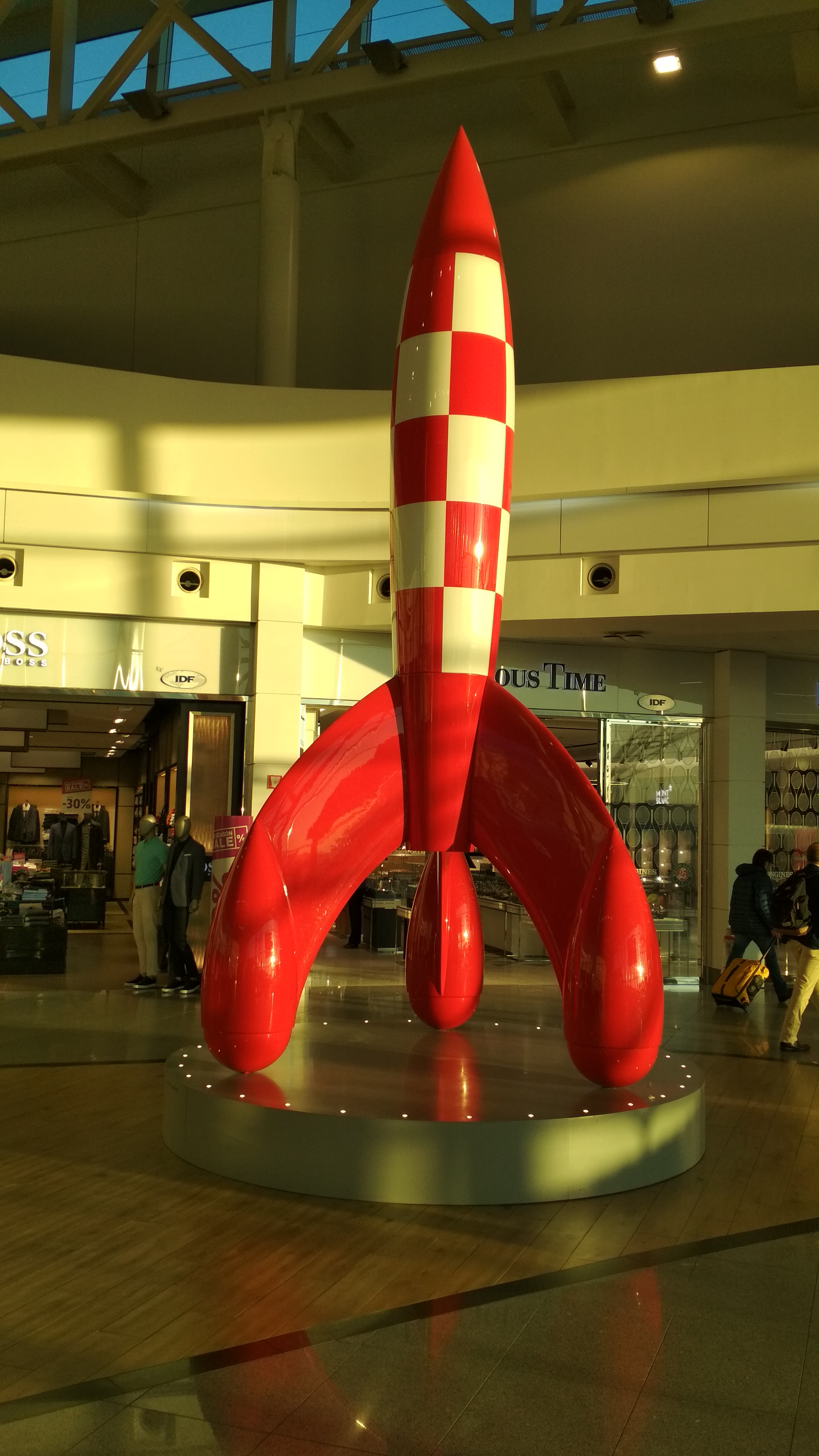
A model of Hergé's fictional rocket at Brussels Airport

Nevertheless, Heuvelmans thought his influence on the story to be more significant, stating that "in going through the two books we [he and Van Melkebeke] really had the impression that it was what we had originally done at the beginning. In broad outline, that was it".

Hergé hoped for the story to be as realistic as possible, and sought to eschew fantastical elements. In his own words, it contained "no moonmen, no monsters, no incredible surprises". To ensure this realism, he collected a wide range of documents about rockets and space travel with which to conduct research. In this he was aided by Heuvelmans, who collected pictures of rockets and atomic research facilities for him. Hergé's research archive included an article from the American magazine Collier's which discussed how humanity could reach the Moon, as well as books by Pierre Rousseau and Auguste Piccard. A further work that he used was L'Astronautique (1950), a book on putative space travel by the physicist Alexander Ananoff, with whom Hergé began a correspondence in April 1950. He also visited the Ateliers de Constructions Electriques de Charleroi's Center for Atomic Research, striking up a subsequent correspondence with its director, Max Hoyaux. Hergé incorporated much of this technical information into the story, but juxtaposed it with moments of humour to make it more accessible to his young readership.

According to literary critics Jean-Marc Lofficier and Randy Lofficier, possible fictional influences on Hergé's story include Jules Verne's 1870 novel Around the Moon and the 1950 American film Destination Moon. Hergé was certainly inspired by a number of photographic stills from the Destination Moon film which had been published. The computer system at the Sprodj space centre was visually based upon the UNIVAC I, the first computer to be created for non-military purposes. Hergé based his Moon rocket on the designs of the V-2 rocket which had been developed by German scientists during World War II. The red-and-white checker pattern on Hergé's rocket was based upon an illustration of a V-2 which Hergé had come upon in Leslie Simon's 1947 book German Research in World War II. He commissioned the construction of a model rocket with detachable parts from his assistant Arthur Van Noeyen. He took the model to Paris where he showed it to Ananoff, asking him if it was realistic representation of what a Moon rocket might look like. He and his assistants then used the model from which to accurately sketch when producing the comic.

Hergé also inserted a cameo of Jacobs into the story, using him as the basis for a scientist that appears on page 40 of Destination Moon, a nod to Jacobs' inclusion of a reference to Hergé in one of his Blake and Mortimer mysteries, The Mystery of the Great Pyramid (1954).

=== Publication ===
The cover of Tintin magazine that first announced the impending Moon adventure

Hergé announced the upcoming story with two consecutive covers of Tintin magazine each depicting the Moon. The story began serialisation in the Belgian Tintin magazine from 30 March 1950, in the French language. It then began serialisation over the border in France, in that country's edition of the magazine, from 11 May 1950. During this time, there were changes to how Hergé conducted his work; on 6 April 1950, he established Studios Hergé as a public company. The Studios were based in his Avenue Delleur house in Brussels, with Hergé making a newly purchased country house in Céroux-Mousty his and Germaine's main abode. The Studios would provide both personal support to Hergé and technical support for his ongoing work. He hired Bob de Moor as his primary apprentice at the Studios in March 1951. On 7 September 1950, only six months after the start of serialisation, the story was interrupted due to the fact Hergé was suffering another breakdown and had been developing eczema on his hands. On 9 April 1952, the story was continued in Tintin.

The story was collected together and published by Editions Casterman as Objectif Lune in 1953. The title had been Hergé's own choice, having rejected Casterman's suggestion of Tintin and the Nuclear Rocket. For publication in book form, the story was re-coloured, with various changes being made; for instance, in the serialised version, the uniforms worn by staff were green, and they are changed to blue for the book volume. A number of scenes were also deleted, including Snowy about to be thrown out into outer space accidentally by Haddock, the Thompsons getting lost on their moonwalk. Hergé sent a copy to Ananoff, with a message stating that "your help, your knowledge, has been invaluable, enabling me to get my little characters to the Moon... and to bring them back safe and sound". An English-language translation of the book was published in 1959.

Marking the Apollo 11 Moon landings in 1969, Hergé produced an illustration in which NASA astronaut Neil Armstrong has just arrived on the Moon, only to be greeted by Tintin, Snowy, Haddock, and Calculus carrying roses and a sign welcoming him. That same year, the French magazine Paris Match commissioned him to produce a short comic documenting the Apollo 12 landings.

== Critical analysis ==
Jean-Marc Lofficier and Randy Lofficier believed that the two-part story "belongs" to Calculus, because his "cosmic vision moves the story forward". They further expressed the opinion that Wolff was a unique character in the Adventures of Tintin, suggesting that he is akin to a character from a John le Carré novel. They felt that the Moon adventure was "Hergé at his best... a triumphant achievement on every level", awarding both halves of the story five stars out of five. Harry Thompson described the entire Moon adventure as "a technical masterpiece" as a result of its "uncannily accurate" depiction of the Moon. Hergé biographer Pierre Assouline felt that the two Moon adventures "mark a stage in the development of Hergé's work". Conversely, Hergé biographer Benoît Peeters was critical of the two-part story arc, stating that they had "neither the liveliness and dynamism" of The Secret of the Unicorn/Red Rackham's Treasure, "nor the supernatural quality" of The Seven Crystal Balls/Prisoners of the Sun.

In his psychoanalytical study of the Adventures of Tintin, the literary critic Jean-Marie Apostolidès praised the Destination Moon-Explorers on the Moon story arc for its "meticulous attention to scientific facts", but added that this had also resulted in the story's "rather pedagogical tone". He added that in these stories, the main division was "no longer Good and Evil" as it had been in previous Adventures, but "Truth and Error". Apostolidès opined that despite being a "fussy and somewhat ridiculous character", through his scientific achievements Calculus grows to the "stature of a giant" in this arc, eclipsing Sir Francis Haddock (from The Secret of the Unicorn) as the series' "founding ancestor". He goes on to claim that in becoming the "sacred ancestor", the voyage to the Moon becomes "a mystical quest" with science as its guiding religion. Drawing comparisons between this arc and the Prisoners of the Sun story, he drew symbolic links between the scientific centre and the Inca Temple of the Sun, but noted that here Calculus was the "high priest" rather than the sacrificial victim as he had been in the previous story. Moving on to discuss the Moon rocket in these stories, Apostolidès described it as a phallic object which penetrated the "virgin territory" of the Moon. At the same time, he described the rocket as a "maternal belly" in which the space explorers slept.

Literary critic Tom McCarthy stated that in the Destination Moon-Explorers of the Moon story arc, Calculus "embodies Hergé's ... own wartime position, spun out into a post-war environment", representing a genius driven by his work whose activities are coincidental to national and political causes. He suggested that the scene in which Captain Haddock rides a pantomime hobby horse can be contrasted with the many scenes in which Haddock is thrown off of a horse's back during the Adventures. McCarthy also interpreted the scene in which Calculus cries and tears at his hair in response to the rocket's capture by the enemy as reflecting Hergé's own anxieties at having his work published and reinterpreted by his readers. He was also of the opinion that several scenes in Destination Moon reflected recurring themes throughout the series; he suggested that Haddock's attempts at smuggling whisky into Syldavia echoed the smuggling of treasure in The Secret of the Unicorn, while the "correction" in which Thompson and Thomson were recognised as not being spies reflected a theme of corrections in the series. He also believed that there was an example of Hergé's secret vulgarity within Destination Moon, with a diagram above Calculus' head in one scene resembling buttocks.

== Adaptation ==
In 1957, the animation company Belvision Studios produced a string of colour adaptations based on Hergé's original comics, adapting eight of the Adventures into a series of daily five-minute episodes. Destination Moon was the first to be adapted in the second animated series; it was directed by Ray Goossens and written by Greg, a well-known cartoonist who was to become editor-in-chief of Tintin magazine.

In 1991, a second animated series based upon The Adventures of Tintin was produced, this time as a collaboration between the French studio Ellipse and the Canadian animation company Nelvana. Destination Moon was the fourteenth story to be adapted and was divided into two twenty-minute episodes. Directed by Stéphane Bernasconi, the series has been praised for being "generally faithful" to the original comics, to the extent that the animation was directly adopted from Hergé's original panels.
