= Bugatti Type 52 =

Half-scale Bugatti electric racing car

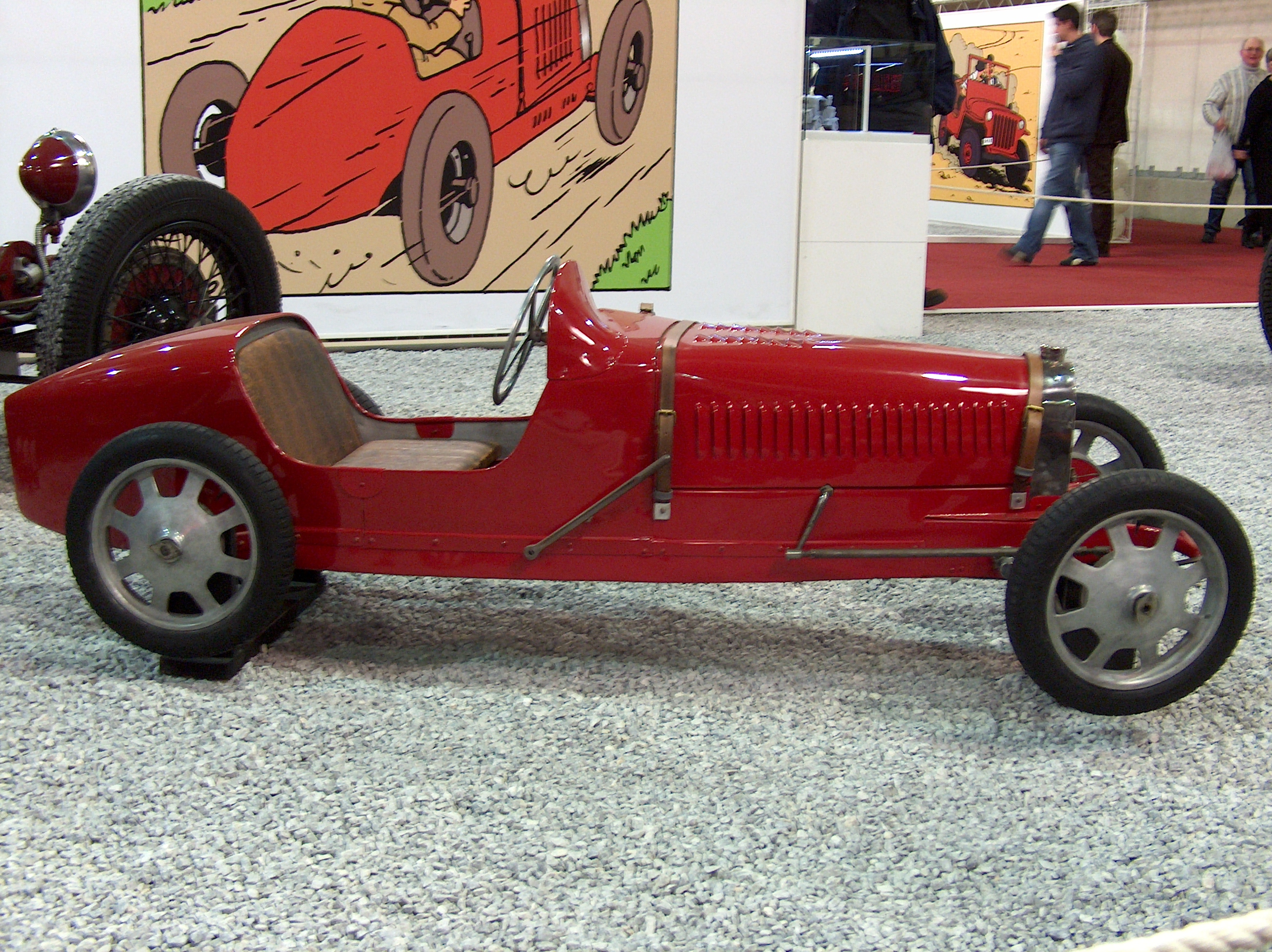
1929 Bugatti Type 52.

The Bugatti Type 52 was a half-scale Bugatti Type 35 electric racing car for children. About 500 examples were produced in total. About 150 of these were the short-nosed variant while the majority of production comprised the long-nosed variant which was 10 cm longer to get elder children to use it.

Production took place at the Molsheim factory between 1927 and 1936, and the cars were frequently used both as playthings and for more serious racing among the children of the European elite.

The first example of a Type 52 was built for Bugatti founder Ettore Bugatti's son, four-year-old Roland, and was first shown at an exhibition in Milan. The number 52 was probably given by the late Hugh Conway and was never used by the factory. The factory always referred the car as Baby.

The Type 52 was powered by a single 12 volt electric motor with front and reverse. Braking was done by way of expanding wooden shoes at the front and rear drums.

The car was originally just 1200 mm (47.2 in) between the wheels, but this was expanded to 1350 mm (53.1 in) when it was found that even children had difficulty with leg room. The car was about 1,800 mm (70.9 in) long overall with a 625 mm (24.6 in) track width.

In 2019, The Little Car Company based in Launton, England received a full license from Bugatti to reproduce the Type-52 in a fully electric, 3/4-scale vehicle for children.

The Baby II as it is known, is nearly fifty percent bigger than the Type 52. The Baby II has a wheelbase of 1,800 mm (70.9 in) and a total length of 2,760 mm (108.7 in). It sits at 800 mm (31.5 in) high, and 1,060 mm (41.7 in) wide.

Baby II has two electric powertrain options, ranging from 1 kW to 4 kW, and with the speed key provided with the Pur Sang and Vitesse models, 10 kW of power is unlocked and speed is unlimited with a tested top speed of 45 miles per hour.
