= Land of Black Gold =

Comic album by Belgian cartoonist Hergé

Land of Black Gold (Tintin au pays de l'or noir)
- Cover of the English edition
- Date: 1950; 1971 (remake)
- Series: The Adventures of Tintin
- Publisher: Casterman

Creative team
- Creator: Hergé

Original publication
- Published in: Le Petit Vingtième (unfinished); Tintin magazine
- Date of publication: 28 September 1939 – 8 May 1940 (unfinished) / 16 September 1948 – 23 February 1950
- Language: French

Translation
- Publisher: Methuen
- Date: 1972
- Translator: Leslie Lonsdale-Cooper; Michael Turner

Chronology
- Preceded by: King Ottokar's Sceptre (1939) (original) Prisoners of the Sun (1949)
- Followed by: Destination Moon (1953)

Land of Black Gold (French: Tintin au pays de l'or noir) is the fifteenth volume of The Adventures of Tintin, the comics series by Belgian cartoonist Hergé. The story was commissioned by the conservative Belgian newspaper Le Vingtième Siècle for its children's supplement Le Petit Vingtième, in which it was initially serialised from September 1939 until the German invasion of Belgium in May 1940, at which the newspaper was shut down and the story interrupted. After eight years, Hergé returned to Land of Black Gold, completing its serialisation in Belgium's Tintin magazine from September 1948 to February 1950, after which it was published in a collected volume by Casterman in 1950. Set on the eve of a European war, the plot revolves around the attempts of young Belgian reporter Tintin to uncover a militant group responsible for sabotaging oil supplies in the Middle East.

At the request of Hergé's British publisher, Methuen, in 1971 he made a range of alterations to the Land of Black Gold, transferring the setting from the British Mandate for Palestine to the fictional state of Khemed. As with the revised edition of The Black Island, most of the changes to this third version of the volume were carried out by Hergé's assistant, Bob de Moor. Hergé followed Land of Black Gold with Destination Moon, while The Adventures of Tintin itself became a defining part of the Franco-Belgian comics tradition. Critical approaches to the story have been mixed, with differing opinions expressed as to the competing merits of the volume's three versions. The story was adapted for the 1991 animated series The Adventures of Tintin by Ellipse and Nelvana.

== Plot ==
Across Europe, car engines are spontaneously exploding; this coincides with the spectre of a potential war throughout the continent, resulting in Captain Haddock being mobilised into the navy. Detectives Thomson and Thompson initially suspect that the oil crisis is a scam intended to drive up business for a local roadside assistance company. While at a meeting, Tintin learns from the managing director of Belgium's leading oil company, Speedol, that it is a result of someone tampering with the petrol at its source, and discovers a conspiracy involving a crew member stationed on one of their petrol tankers, the Speedol Star. The three work undercover as new members of the Star's crew as it sets off for the Middle Eastern kingdom of Khemed. Recognising Snowy from Tintin's earlier scouting of the ship, the treacherous mate attempts to drown the dog, but becomes amnesiac in an altercation with Tintin.

Upon arrival, Tintin and the detectives are framed and arrested by the authorities under various charges. Thomson and Thompson are cleared and released, but Tintin is kidnapped by the Arab insurgent Bab El Ehr, who mistakenly believes that Tintin has information for him concerning an arms delivery. Tintin escapes and encounters an old enemy, Dr. Müller, sabotaging an oil pipeline. He reunites with Thomson and Thompson during a sandstorm and eventually arrives in Khemed's capital city of Wadesdah. When Tintin narrates the sabotage orchestrated by Müller to the Emir Mohammed Ben Kalish Ezab, one of the Emir's attendants, Ali Ben Mahmud, informs the Emir that his son Prince Abdullah is missing. Suspecting that Müller has kidnapped Abdullah, Tintin sets out to rescue the prince.

While on Müller's trail, Tintin meets his old friend, the Portuguese merchant Oliveira da Figueira. With Figueira's help, Tintin enters Müller's house and knocks him unconscious. Tintin knocks Abdullah down and as Abdullah throws tantrums, Tintin starts arguing with him. He finds the prince imprisoned in a dungeon and rescues him as Haddock arrives with the authorities. Müller is revealed to be the agent of a foreign power responsible for the tampering of the fuel supplies, having invented a type of chemical in tablet form, codenamed Formula 14, which increases the explosive power of oil by a significant amount. Thomson and Thompson find the tablets and, mistaking them for aspirin due to their being packaged as such, swallow them, resulting in them growing long hair and beards that change colour. After analysing the tablets, Professor Calculus develops an antidote for Thomson and Thompson and a means of countering the affected oil supplies.

== History ==
=== Background and influences ===
Georges Remi—best known under the pen name Hergé—was employed as editor and illustrator of Le Petit Vingtième ("The Little Twentieth"), a children's supplement to Le Vingtième Siècle ("The Twentieth Century"), a staunchly Roman Catholic, conservative Belgian newspaper based in Hergé's native Brussels, formerly run by the Abbé Norbert Wallez, who had subsequently been removed from the paper's editorship following a scandal. In 1929, Hergé began The Adventures of Tintin comic strip for Le Petit Vingtième, revolving around the exploits of fictional Belgian reporter Tintin.

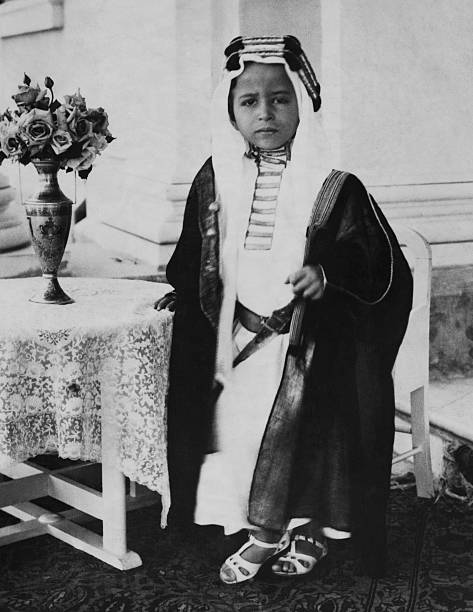
Faisal II, who became King of Iraq in 1939 at the age of four, served as an inspiration of Abdullah

Hergé incorporated several characters into the story who had previously been introduced in earlier Adventures; this included Dr. Müller, a German villain who had previously appeared in The Black Island, and the Portuguese merchant Oliveira da Figueira, who had first appeared in Cigars of the Pharaoh. Hergé also included a reference to the recurring character Bianca Castafiore, whose singing appears on the radio in one scene. He also introduced a number of new characters in the story; this included the Emir Ben Kalish Ezab, a character who was based largely on Ibn Saud, the king of Saudi Arabia, whom Hergé had learned about from a 1939 book by Anton Zischke. It has also been suggested that the character was partly inspired by the deceased Iraqi leader, Faisal I. The character of the Emir's son, Prince Abdullah, was inspired by the King of Iraq, Faisal II, who was appointed monarch in 1939 aged four, although in creating this character Hergé had also been influenced by an obnoxious child character that appears in the work of O. Henry.

The idea of European nations rivaling each other for oil supplies was inspired by a February 1934 issue of Le Crapouillot magazine. The fictional Arabic names that Hergé integrated into the story were parodies based on the Marollien dialect of Brussels; "Wadesdah" translated as "what is that?", "Bab El Ehr" was Marollien for chatterbox, Kalish Ezab derived from the Marollien term for sugarelly, and Moulfrid, the last name of Kalish Ezab's military adviser Yussuf Ben Mulfrid (Youssouf Ben Moulfrid in the original French version), is named after a dish named "Moules-frites".

"Boum!", an iconic song by Charles Trenet, appears in parody as the roadside assistance company's advertising jingle, which plays on Thomson and Thompson's car radio at the very beginning of the story. The Supermarine Spitfire, a British single-seat fighter aircraft, was used as the model for Kalish Ezab's plane which drops leaflets onto Bab El Ehr's camp. In creating Land of Black Gold, Hergé adopted many elements from a previously aborted idea about militants blowing up prominent buildings in Europe; rather than European buildings, this story would involve industrial sabotage.

=== First version: 1939–40 ===
Tintin et Milou au pays de l'or liquide (Tintin and Snowy in the Land of Liquid Gold) published in the paper La Voix de l'ouest in 1945, showing Tintin's kidnap by Zionists and subsequent capture by Arabs.

Following the German invasion of Poland, Hergé was conscripted into the Belgian Army and temporarily stationed in Herenthout. Discharged within the month, he returned to Brussels and began Land of Black Gold. The story subsequently began serialisation in Le Vingtième Siècle on 25 September 1939. He was re-mobilised in December and stationed in Antwerp, from where he continued to send the Tintin strip to Le Petit Vingtième. However, he fell ill with sinusitis and boils and was declared unfit for service in May 1940. That same day, Germany invaded Belgium, and Le Vingtième Siècle was shut down part way through the serialisation of Land of Black Gold, on 8 May. The point at which the story was ended corresponds to pages 28 and 30 of the current book edition, when Tintin is caught in a sandstorm following his first confrontation with Müller. This version, which amounts to 58 pages, has never been collected in book form.

Given its portrayal of Germans as the antagonists of the story, it would not have been appropriate for Land of Black Gold to continue serialisation under Nazi occupation. After being published in Belgium, the story began serialisation in neighbouring France; initially appearing in the magazine Cœurs Vaillants-Âmes Vaillantes from 4 August 1940, the story was ultimately interrupted, and would only recommence in June 1945, this time in the magazine Message Aux Cœurs Vaillants. From December 1945 to May 1946, it appeared in a youth supplement to the newspaper La Voix de l'Ouest under the title of Tintin et Milou au pays de l'or liquide ("Tintin and Snowy in the Land of Liquid Gold").

=== Second version: 1948–49 ===
By the late 1940s, after the end of the Second World War, Hergé was continuing to produce new installments of The Adventures of Tintin for the Belgian magazine Tintin, of which he was the artistic director. After completing serialisation of Prisoners of the Sun in April 1948, he ordered his staff to re-serialise one of his old stories, Popol Out West, while he took a three-month break. At this point, Hergé was depressed and suffering from a range of physical ailments, including boils and eczema on his hands. Although fed up with The Adventures of Tintin, he felt great pressure on him to continue producing the series for Tintin magazine. Hergé was planning on creating a story in which Tintin travels to the moon, but his wife Germaine and close friend Marcel Dehaye both advised him to revive Land of Black Gold instead, recognising that it would entail less work and thus cause him less stress. Thus, Land of Black Gold was revived after an eight-year hiatus. In a letter to Germaine, he stated that "I don't like to restart things that are already finished, or to make repairs. Black Gold was a repair, and I abandoned it".

The story began serialisation in Tintin magazine from 16 September 1948, before beginning its serialisation in the French edition of the magazine from 28 October. Rather than continuing at the point where he had previously left off, Hergé restarted the story from scratch. He nevertheless made revisions to the early part of the story, namely by reworking the characters of Captain Haddock (who now first appears in a new scene on page 3) and Professor Calculus, as well as the location of Marlinspike Hall, into the narrative, all of which were elements that had been introduced to the Adventures of Tintin during the intervening eight years. Other alterations include new scenes of Tintin making a divining rod, Tintin disguising himself as one of Müller's henchmen, and a restructuring of the Thompsons' humorous antics while driving a Jeep (a Peugeot 201 in the original version) prior to their reunion with Tintin; the scene in which they fall asleep at the wheel and crash into a mosque, for instance, originally took place without Tintin's presence. Hergé was contractually obliged to produce two pages of comic for each issue, and in the previous adventure, Prisoners of the Sun, had fulfilled this by producing two pages of new Tintin stories each week. Seeking to limit his workload, he would only produce one page of Land of Black Gold per issue, with the other page being filled by a re-serialisation of old stories from his Jo, Zette and Jocko series.

On 4 August 1949, the story was suspended part way through its serialisation as Hergé left Belgium for a holiday near Gland, Switzerland. The magazine used this as a publicity stunt, posting a headline in their next issue declaring "Shocking News: Hergé Has Disappeared!" to encourage speculation as to his whereabouts among the young readership. His co-workers and staff at Tintin magazine were increasingly annoyed by unplanned absences such as this, which affected the entire production; his colleague Edgar P. Jacobs sent him letters urging him to return to work. After an absence of twelve weeks, Land of Black Gold continued serialisation on 27 October. Following its serialisation, Land of Black Gold was collected together and published in a 62-page colour volume by Editions Casterman in 1950.

=== Third version: 1971 ===
After Hergé had redrawn The Black Island for publication in the United Kingdom, his British publishers at that time, Methuen, suggested that alterations be made to Land of Black Gold before releasing it into the UK market; in compliance with their requests, much of the content between pages 6 and 20 was rewritten and redrawn. Hergé's assistant, Bob de Moor, was responsible for many of the alterations. De Moor was sent to the port at Antwerp to sketch a 1939 oil tanker that would provide a basis for a ship that appears in the story, the Speedol Star. For this version, Hergé transplanted the events of the story from Palestine to the fictional Emirate of Khemed and its capital city of Wadesdah, a setting that he had used in a later adventure, The Red Sea Sharks. This modernised third version was issued by Casterman in 1971.

In the original versions, Tintin arrived at Haifa in the British Mandate of Palestine, where he was arrested by British police before being captured by members of the Irgun, a Zionist terrorist organization, who mistake him for one of their own agents (named "Finkelstein" in the first version, "Salomon Goldstein" in the second), before being abducted by a henchman of Bab El Ehr. In this revised version, Tintin arrives at Khemkhah in Khemed, where he is arrested by the Arab military police before being captured and taken directly to Bab El Ehr. The inclusion of forces from the British Palestinian Mandate and the Irgun were no longer seen as relevant and thus were removed from the story, including the characters of the British officers Commandant [sic] Thorpe and Lieutenant Edwards (respectively responsible for the Thompsons' detainment and release, and the arresting of the Irgun agents who kidnapped Tintin). These changes were also applied to a scene which a Supermarine Spitfire drops propaganda leaflets onto Bab El Ehr's camp: in the earlier versions, the plane is British and Bab El Ehr threatens to shoot anyone who reads the leaflets; in the revised scene, the plane's nationality is unidentified and Bab El Ehr laughs off the bombardment as his men are illiterate. As a result of the truncation of Tintin's kidnapping, which now occurs two pages earlier than in the second version, the Thompsons' crash into a palm tree in the desert now takes place after the aforementioned scene. Background details was changed accordingly, with Jewish shop fronts with Hebrew signage being removed, and the nonsensical pseudo-Arabic script from the earlier versions was replaced with real Arabic text. The political rivalry between Britain and Germany that was present in the earlier versions was also toned down.

== Critical analysis ==
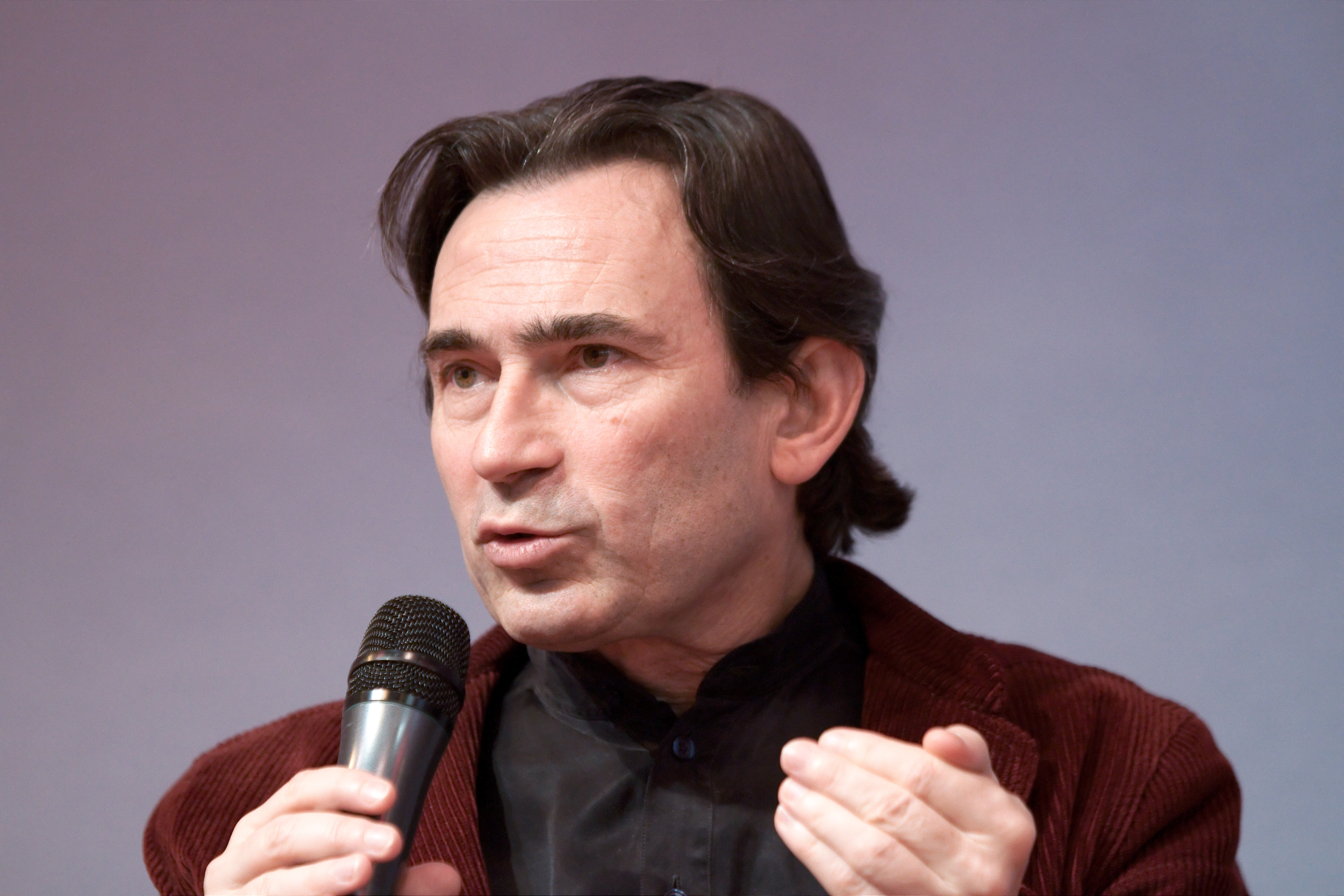
Hergé biographer Benoît Peeters (pictured, 2010) felt that Land of Black Gold came across as being "rebaked".

Hergé biographer Benoît Peeters stated that "no book has gone through more ups and downs" than Land of Black Gold, adding that it carries a "mood of foreboding" caused by the impending war in the story. He also felt that the introduction of the Emir and Abdullah was "the most striking innovation in this story", and elsewhere declared that its earlier versions contained "not the slightest trace of anti-Semitism", despite allegations that a number of other Adventures featuring Jewish characters exhibited anti-Semitic stereotypes.

Jean-Marc Lofficier and Randy Lofficier believed that Land of Black Gold suffered from having been "rebaked", being "pulled between the 'old' pre-war Tintin and the more modern one". The Lofficiers opined that the story's "clear concern about war and rumours of war" enable it to fit well after King Ottokar's Sceptre, at the point at which Hergé had initially developed it. They felt that this pre-Second World War atmosphere also pervaded the second, coloured version of the book, but that they had nevertheless been partly removed by the creation of the third version. Despite this, they felt that the third version of the story was "better" because it incorporated elements from the spy thrillers that had become increasingly popular in Western Europe during the 1950s. Despite its problems, they thought that the Thom(p)sons' ingestion of Formula 14 was "virtually inspired", showing that Hergé "had lost none of his touch when it comes to creating unforgettable images". They opined that the character of Abdullah "indisputably steals the show" in Land of Black Gold, commenting on his "love-hate" relationship with Haddock and suggesting that he is "possibly the only character to have ever succeeded in driving Tintin so batty that he loses his cool". Regarding Haddock's inclusion in the later editions of the story, the Lofficiers felt that he was retroactively "shoehorned" into the narrative, but noted that the running gag of Haddock's failed attempts to provide an adequate explanation for his appearance ― each beginning with the phrase "It's quite simple really, and at the same time rather complicated" ― anticipates the "self-referential and second-degree" humour Hergé would employ in The Castafiore Emerald. They ultimately awarded the story two stars out of five, feeling that Hergé had been unable to develop its "greater potential".

Michael Farr believed that Land of Black Gold illustrated how "shelved material could be usefully resuscitated". He added that in making revisions to the story for the 1971 version, "the result is disappointing, lacking the pungency which the contemporary allusion gave the earlier version". Farr felt that in this story, the Thom(p)sons "have a splendid adventure" with the various scenarios that they get into. Harry Thompson described Land of Black Gold as a "patchwork effort", believing that the final result owed little to the "story's original satirical thrust". He praised Khemed as Hergé's "most successful imaginary country", something that he attributed to its "geographic accuracy" and to the "realistic parody" of Arabic names. However, he criticised the way in which Haddock had been integrated into the story, deeming this to be "the least satisfying aspect" of it. Believing that it offered a "fine swansong" for the decline of the Thom(p)sons as central characters in the series, ultimately Thompson felt that Land of Black Gold retained a "somewhat fragmentary air". Differing from Thompson's assessment, Hergé biographer Pierre Assouline felt that the inclusion of Haddock into the story was successful, "precisely because [it] defied all logic".

Literary critic Tom McCarthy believed that in the story, the desert represented "a space of multiple misreading", which included the mirages, fake documents, and cases of mistaken identity. Focusing on those fake documents, he believed that it represented the theme of fakery which recurs throughout the series. Describing the scenario in which Thomson and Thompson are lost and driving around the desert, he refers to it as a "brilliantly allegorical scene", before highlighting Hergé's "wishful retroactive wiping out of history" by evading the war. In his psychoanalytical study of the Adventures of Tintin, the literary critic Jean-Marie Apostolidès dealt only briefly with Land of Black Gold, commenting that Calculus' development of a cure for the Thom(p)sons' consumption of N14 was a sign of his growing status and reputation as a scientist, as he moved from being the "small-time, ridiculous" inventor of Red Rackham's Treasure and came to establish himself as the internationally renowned scientist of Destination Moon.

== Adaptations ==
In 1991, a collaboration between the French studio Ellipse and the Canadian animation company Nelvana adapted 21 of the stories into a series of episodes, each 42 minutes long. Land of Black Gold was the thirteenth episode of The Adventures of Tintin to be produced. Directed by Stéphane Bernasconi, the series has been praised for being "generally faithful", with compositions having been actually directly taken from the panels in the original album.

== See also ==
- The Adventures of Tintin publication history
