= Hergé's Adventures of Tintin =

Animated television series

- The title sequence of "The Crab with the Golden Claws"
- Genre: Animated series Adventure
- Created by: Hergé; Greg (adaptation)
- Directed by: Ray Goossens
- Voices of: Dallas McKennon and Paul Frees (US Version); Peter Hawkins (UK Version)
- Country of origin: Belgium
- Original languages: French; English
- No. of seasons: 7
- No. of episodes: 103

Production
- Executive producer: Raymond Leblanc
- Producer: Belvision
- Running time: 5 minutes (approx.) The first season is 4 minutes long per episode

Original release
- Network: RTB
- Release: 1957 – 1964

A scene from The Crab with the Golden Claws

Hergé's Adventures of Tintin (French: Les Aventures de Tintin, d'après Hergé) is the first animated television series based on Hergé's popular comic book series, The Adventures of Tintin. The series was produced by Belvision Studios and first aired in 1957. After two books were adapted in black and white, eight books were then adapted in colour, each serialised into a set of five-minute episodes, with 103 episodes produced (twelve in black and white and ninety-one in colour).

== Development ==
=== Background: Creation of Belvision and the first two adventures ===
Raymond Leblanc, editor of the Tintin magazine, viewed the emergence of television as a promising medium for his paper characters, so on 15 October 1954, he created the Belvision Studios. It was specified that the purpose of the company was to produce filmed programs. The key player of the company was Karel Van Milleghem, editor of Kuifje (the Dutch-speaking version of the Tintin magazine).

The first real animations were carried out by Belvision from 1955 to 1958 for Belgian Television, with basic means. First, there were several animation adaptations of Flemish artist Willy Vandersteen's comics Suske en Wiske which Karel Van Milleghem liked.

In 1956, Belvision secured rights to adapt stories from The Adventures of Tintin from Hergé and signed a contract with the French Radio-Television, for two stories of Tintin cartoons. This was a series of animations produced in 1957 by Belvision for the French Radio-Television (RTF because there was only one channel in France at that time). They were made in 16 mm black and white film, from the books King Ottokar's Sceptre and The Broken Ear.

This black and white animated series can therefore be considered as the very first adaptation of Tintin's adventures in cartoons. Hergé, who had just completed the publication of The Calculus Affair and who was immersed in The Red Sea Sharks project, did not intend to be mobilized by this parallel project for two years. This is why he asked his collaborator Bob De Moor to follow him closely. De Moor would ensure and supervise the layout of the characters and the sets.

King Ottokar’s Sceptre had 8 episodes of thirteen minutes, while The Broken Ear had 7 episodes. They were broadcast on RTF. ‘King Ottokar’s Sceptre’ aired from 28 November 1957 to 15 January 1958 on each Thursday. ‘The Broken Ear’ aired from 4 July 1959 to 15 August 1959 on each Saturday. In these two series, everything is done in semi-animation mode with a majority of still images and a few rare character movements. Only the episodes of The Broken Ear have a little more animation. Hergé finally got more involved than expected in the scripts and the drawings. Some of the boxes of the comics had undergone some small alterations as well as totally new images, notably in The Broken Ear. Likewise, the script has sometimes been changed. For example, at the beginning of ‘King Ottokar's Sceptre’ (episode 1), in the Syldavian restaurant "Klow", Tintin does not ask to go to the toilet but asks to phone. These visual and oral changes were deemed necessary to make the whole thing more captivating for viewers.

Jean Nohain narrated the episodes and voiced all the characters. The BBC created UK dubs of King Ottokar's Sceptre with Gerald Campion voicing Tintin, and The Broken Ear, where Peter Hawkins voiced all the characters.

On the advice of R.T.F., the production was entrusted to Anne-Marie Ullmann, who was prohibited from retouching the drawings provided by Studios Hergé. This refusal resulted in laborious animation and frozen characters. The result disappointed RTF, which terminated its association with Belvision, along with Van Milleghem.

=== Hiatus and new adventures ===
Leblanc then hired Ray Goossens, a professional from cartoon advertising, recommended to him by Van Milleghem.

Under the leadership of Goossens, Belvision renounced 16 mm in black and white, and equipped itself for 35 mm in color. They went from semi-animation to "full animation" thanks to the studio of Larry Harmon; using the system of layers with pins and the tracing of images on cels.

In 1960, Leblanc managed to involve Télé-Hachette, the subsidiary of the French publisher, in his film projects about Tintin. The goal was to produce five useful minutes per week, which is how Belvision attracted from 20 to 120 people in a few weeks.

Hergé participated more in the development process, and supervised a lot of meetings between his collaborators (Bob De Moor and Jacques Martin) and those of Belvision.

The French version starred Georges Poujouly as Tintin and Jean Clarieux as Captain Haddock. In the US dubbed version, Harmon and Dallas McKennon both voiced Tintin, with Paul Frees as Captain Haddock.

Hergé’s Adventures of Tintin, which was directed by Ray Goossens and produced by Belvision and Télé-Hachette between 1959 and 1964, can be considered as the first real cartoon adaptation of the Adventures of Tintin.

It brings together eight stories of Tintin.

- Destination Moon
- Explorers on the Moon
- The Crab with the Golden Claws
- The Secret of the Unicorn
- Red Rackham's Treasure
- The Shooting Star
- The Black Island
- The Calculus Affair

"Hergé’s Adventures of Tintin" were the opening words to each episode. Each adventure was divided into small episodes of about 5 minutes preceded by a summary and followed by the announcement of the following episode. Each one ended with a teaser that encouraged the viewer not to miss the next episode.

=== The Calculus Case ===
Several liberties were taken in the adaptation and the script quality was sometimes poor. After 89 five-minute episodes, Télé-Hachette was dissatisfied with the result and decided, in 1963, not to renew the contract with Belvision. Nevertheless, Raymond Leblanc decided to produce a new adaptation despite everything, alone with Belvision. It was The Calculus Affair, on a screenplay by Greg and Bernard Fredisch, in thirteen five-minute episodes. Not coproduced by Télé-Hachette, The Calculus Affair has always had a special status and is considered a feature film (like Tintin and the Temple of the Sun or Tintin and the Lake of Sharks). After being released on VHS in the 1980s, it was released on DVD in France on 14 May 2008, in a remastered edition, in the Tintin animated feature set at Citel Vidéo. ‘The Calculus Affair’ DVD was reissued in 2011 in the 23rd volume of the Tintin collection by Hachette editions.

== Changes from the books ==
Most stories in the television series varied widely from the original books, thus changing whole plots.

=== Objective Moon ===
Unlike in the comic where two other saboteurs are parachuted in and shoot Tintin, Colonel Boris Jorgen (nameless in the adaptation) is the only enemy to break into the base. Additionally, while examining the experimental rocket, Jorgen is attacked by Snowy and pushes him into the rocket before launching take-off. Tintin and his companions build a second rocket and go to the Moon not to explore it but to save Snowy, locked in the small rocket and having only a few days of oxygen available. The lunar rocket is called "XM2 Rocket" whereas it is simply called "Lunar Rocket" in the comic. Captain Haddock's whiskey is replaced by coffee and flies into space, not out of drunkenness, but because he takes off his shoes which hurt him (when the lack of pressure should seriously affect his feet). The Thom(p)sons do not have the hair or the beard that grows although a scene from 'Land of Black Gold' has been adapted. The characters faced a meteor shower on the Moon, and found themselves trapped in a cave from which they escaped using dynamite. Instead of a moon tank, Professor Calculus has a sort of transparent-roofed flying mini-ship named ‘the moon mobile’. The rocket, while returning to Earth, smashes into rocks and falls to the side, causing a fire (creating a death-hazard). Tintin never knew Jorgen, whereas in the comic, they met in King Ottokar’s Sceptre when he is the colonel in the service of his majesty. Jorgen and Frank Wolff remain alive and are brought back to Earth as prisoners, unlike the comic where Jorgen is accidentally killed by Wolff who subsequently commits suicide by jumping into space. The heroes thank Wolff for saving their lives as Jorgen attempted to take them down. Jorgen talks about Wolff in this version while in the comic, he talks to him. Jorgen is dressed in a brown aviator jacket, sweater, pants and black shoes while in the comic he has the aviator jacket in the same colour, but wears a yellow turtleneck sweater, grey pants and brown shoes. It makes reference to other earlier stories through Tintin reminiscing. It makes mention of Tintin in the Congo, Land of Black Gold and The Red Sea Sharks. The first season has 22 episodes, each with a length of 4 minutes, totaling 1:27:14 when in movie format.

=== The Crab with the Golden Claws ===
The story begins in a port where Tintin sees men throwing a body into the sea. It is there that he decides to investigate. In this version, the crab cans are used to conceal diamonds and not opium. First mate Allan, to be the master on board, drugs Captain Haddock, not with whiskey, but with drugs. Tintin already knows Captain Haddock, although this is his first appearance in the comic strip. After their plane crash, Tintin and Haddock, who wander in the desert, are captured by a looter named "Ahmed the Terrible". After their escape, Ahmed tracks them down but dies falling off a cliff. The pilot of the plane also pursues Tintin and Haddock in the desert before being shot down by Ahmed. Bunji Kuraki was absent and the Karaboudjan was renamed not ‘Djebel Amilah’ but ‘Tangiers’. In this version, Allan is arrested in Captain Haddock's boat and Allan’s entire men die when Tintin throws a bomb at them accidentally (only Allan survives) while in the comic they are all arrested.

=== The Secret of the Unicorn ===
At the beginning, bandits try to steal the boat bought by Tintin, but give up because of the presence of a police officer. While chasing a mouse, Snowy breaks the boat, and a parchment appears. While Tintin walks through it, the light in his home goes out, and then he gets knocked out. The bandits finally leave with the boat. While walking, Tintin sees the boat in a store window. The seller tells him that he has owned it for a long time, and that he cannot sell it. Tintin buys it from him, but a man steals the package. The Thom(p)sons intervene and return the package to Tintin. On returning home, Tintin discovers another parchment in the boat, and decides to go to Captain Haddock. The Bird brothers kidnap Tintin after having knocked him out during the night before sequestering him at their home in the cellar. In the comic, in the cellar, one of the Bird brothers has a weapon while, in the series, the Bird brothers have two weapons. Tintin and his friends chased Max Bird by car. They fight in a pumpkin farmer’s truck and pursued him by a plane. After this pursuit, they succeed in gathering the three parchments and set out in search of Red Rackham's treasure. Barnaby and Ivan Ivanovitch Sakharine are completely missing from the storyline. Marlinspike Hall and Aristides Silk have been renamed ‘Hudson Manor’ and ‘Herbert Knill’ respectively.

=== Red Rackham's Treasure ===
In this version, Max Bird escapes from prison with the help of an accomplice. He participates in the search for the treasure, while he no longer appears after his escape in the comics. Professor Calculus already knows Tintin, even though this is his first appearance in the comic strip. During the trip, Max Bird's accomplice succeeds in stealing the plans that lead to the treasure. Although he is not hard of hearing in this series, Professor Calculus has the time of this episode some hearing problems following the explosion of a failed device. Upon arrival on the island, Tintin and his friends are attacked by the natives. They continue their research and discover a fetish of Sir Francis Haddock. Thompson and Thomson, who transport it, are kidnapped by the natives, who bear a strong resemblance to the Arumbayas from The Broken Ear. These natives then tried to behead them, as an offering to the fetish, which they consider to be an idol. Captain Haddock hides behind his ancestor's fetish and imitates him, saying he does not want this gift. The natives bow and kneel. Tintin takes the opportunity to free the detectives. On the island, Max Bird and his accomplice are on the verge of suppressing Tintin and his friends, but miss their target. It is the fetish which is touched, in the nose. Snowy, hidden behind the two bandits, attacks them. Max Bird's accomplice is caught and questioned. During the excavations in the wreck of The Unicorn, Tintin is attacked by Max Bird, who tries to cut his rope and his air inlet tube. An octopus attacks him, Tintin saves him and it is for Bird the end of the adventure. Haddock had an encounter with shark rather than Tintin. Tintin and his friends return to the island, discover a cross planted by Sir Francis Haddock and think that it indicates the location of the treasure. Their research is in vain. But new worries await them: the natives capture them. They were however abandoned when the natives noticed that a volcano was erupting (similar to Flight 714 to Sydney). They are freed by the Thom(p)sons who, as carriers, were not tied up. The island sinks and everyone is saved in time. Tintin and Captain Haddock discover the treasure in the Hudson Manor (Marlinspike Hall). Max Bird tries to escape with it, but runs into Professor Calculus. Tintin takes the opportunity to disarm him. A fight ensues where Calculus intervenes, knocking out Bird Brother with a painting.

=== Star of Mystery ===
Professor Phostle is replaced with Professor Calculus. In line with this change, the phostlite is renamed "calculite". Professor Philippulus is Calculus' assistant, and he predicts the end of the world, but his predictions are wrong. Calculus accompanies Tintin on the meteorite, and the Peary captain and a crewman chase Tintin and Calculus on the meteorite, but are chased off by the giant spider. Captain Chester and Professor Cantonneau has been removed from the storyline, and Thomson and Thompson accompany them on the voyage, whereas in the book they only appeared in one panel. The expedition ship is the Sirius, not the Aurora. The bomb that is placed before departure is contained in a briefcase (and no longer a simple stick of dynamite). The bomber is arrested along with Philippulus. Two sequences have been added: the Sirius is attacked by a submarine which bombards them with torpedoes and a saboteur has managed to board the Sirius to place a bomb there. Professor Calculus parachutes with Snowy while Tintin lands in disaster. Tintin is imprisoned for a moment with Snowy in rocks. They are released by a growing tree. Their plane is destroyed, but later the Captain comes to rescue them with another plane.

=== Black Island ===
Captain Haddock plays a leading role and Professor Calculus almost makes a cameo, while they were absent in the original comic book. Puschov accuses Tintin of robbing him, but in an airport. Tintin and Haddock hide in post office bags to get to Sussex, but Haddock gets in the wrong bag, and they are separated. Tintin later finds Haddock in England examining the plane. Dr. Müller is older and white-haired, and has a goatee. Ranko does not break his arm in this version, and even aids Tintin, Haddock and Snowy. Tintin keeps his usual outfit throughout the episode while in the comic he wears a Scottish kilt. In the comic strip, Counterfeiter Ring has five members, the leader is Puschov. In the series, they are 4 and it is Müller who is the boss, the man with the boots is replaced by a gigantic man and the mustache has disappeared.

=== The Calculus Case ===
This adaptation is loosely based on the book. Jolyon Wagg and his family was entirely removed. Also being absent in this series were Nestor, Arturo Benedetto Giovanni Giuseppe Pietro Archangelo Alfredo Cartoffoli da Milano, Irma, Igor Wagner, Cutts the butcher and Krônik and Klûmsi. Calculus' ultrasound weapon is called "Silly the Silent" (or "No-Sound Nellie" in the US English version). Thomson and Thompson's roles have been expanded, and Haddock is captured with Calculus in "Darkol Prison". This series also saw Tintin's first meeting with Bianca Castafiore whilst in the original book it was their third meeting, which had been started in King Ottokar's Sceptre. Thomson and Thompson's roles have been expanded and they accompany Tintin. Tintin is the person who meets Castafiore in the Music Show, whereas it is Captain Haddock in the original book. Alfredo Topolino and Colonel Sponsz have been renamed "Professor Bretzel" and "Colonel Brutel".

More generally, Tintin's home is located in New York, resulting to be American instead of Belgian (Perhaps, for one of those reasons, "Tintin in America" is not adapted), Captain Haddock does not have a penchant for whiskey (and prefers drinking coffee instead), Professor Calculus does not have hearing problems and wears a yellow trench coat instead of green trench coat, Thomson and Thompson are brothers and their moustaches are identical, and Snowy has a red collar in some episodes.

=== Stories not adapted ===
Some of the Tintin books were not included in the animated series. The stories are Tintin in the Land of the Soviets, Tintin in the Congo (although only one scene was adapted), Tintin in America, Cigars of the Pharaoh, The Blue Lotus, The Seven Crystal Balls (although Belvision would later adapt the story into a film in 1969), Prisoners of the Sun (although Belvision would later adapt the story into a film in 1969), Land of Black Gold (although only one scene was adapted), The Red Sea Sharks (although only one scene was adapted), Tintin in Tibet and The Castafiore Emerald. Reasons for not adapting stories such as Flight 714 to Sydney, Tintin and the Picaros and Tintin and Alph-Art are that they were not written at that time.

== Broadcasts and releases ==
- In the United Kingdom, the series was broadcast by the BBC Television Service (Note: colour television had yet to appear in Britain and therefore, the series aired in black-and-white). Several VHS were released in the UK in both French and English, in colour and a limited edition DVD box set featuring three films was released in 2006 (featuring The Calculus Case [renamed to The Calculus Affair], Prisoners Of The Sun & Mystery Of Shark Lake all as feature-lengths in colour).
- The series has aired in repeats on non-network syndication in the United States from 1963 to 1971. Several video releases were made, in both English and French. To date, no DVD set has been released in the USA, though The Calculus Case was released on DVD as a full-length film.
- The series was directed by Ray Goossens and written by comic artist Greg, who later became the editor of Tintin magazine.
- The first two black-and-white episodes were produced at a time where junking took place. Due to poor reviews, it is rather not unlikely that they are lost episodes. Only screenshots are available.

== Voice artists ==
=== English ===
- Larry Harmon as Tintin, Professor Calculus (Objective Moon and The Crab With the Golden Claws)
- Dallas McKennon as Tintin, Professor Calculus, Other characters (The Secret of Unicorn until Black Island)
- Paul Frees as Captain Haddock, Thomson and Thompson, Other characters, Narrator (all episodes except The Calculus Case)
- Gerald Campion as Tintin (King Ottokar's Sceptre)
- Peter Hawkins as Narrator (The Broken Ear)

=== French ===
- Georges Poujouly as Tintin
- Jean Clarieux as Captain Haddock
- Robert Vattier as Professor Calculus
- Hubert Deschamps as Thomson and Thompson
- René Arrieu as Other characters

== Episodes ==
Season 1: Objective Moon (22 episodes)

1. Espionage
2. Space Pirates
3. The Big Departure
4. Attention... Meteor!
5. Drifting
6. Man in Orbit
7. Lunar Landing
8. Explorers on the Moon
9. Mystery on the Moon
10. Lost
11. Sabotage
12. Moon Sickness
13. Trapped
14. Operation Rescue
15. Buried
16. Prisoners
17. Explosion
18. Dramatic turn of Events
19. Destination Earth
20. More Control
21. Freefall
22. Crash Landing

Season 2: The Crab with the Golden Claws (17 episodes)

1. Suspicions
2. Mystery at Sea
3. Mutiny on the Karaboudjan
4. Escape
5. Adrift at Sea
6. Attack from the Air
7. Crack-Up
8. Thirst
9. Raiders in the Desert
10. Prisoners
11. Desert Dilemma
12. Duel in the Desert
13. Mystery in Morocco
14. Blind Alley
15. Mystery Underground
16. Return of the Karaboudjan
17. Homeward Bound

Season 3: The Secret of the Unicorn (10 episodes)

1. Model Mystery
2. Pirate Attack
3. Battle of Red Rackham
4. Kidnap
5. Trapped
6. Ambushed
7. Battle of Hudson Manor
8. The Crash
9. Captured
10. Duel on the Highway

Season 4: Red Rackham's Treasure (17 episodes)

1. Red Rackham's Treasure
2. Killer Shark
3. Jail Break
4. Stowaway
5. Shipwreck
6. Jungle Jitters
7. Head Hunters
8. Gunfire
9. Operation Rescue
10. Shark Bait
11. Duel in the Deep
12. Demon of the Deep
13. The Eagle's Cross
14. Savage Surprise
15. Vanishing Island
16. Red Rackham's Riddle
17. Treasure Chest

Season 5: Star of Mystery (11 episodes)

1. Star of Mystery
2. Star in the Night
3. Doomsday
4. Bombs Away
5. Man Overboard
6. Torpedoed
7. Time Bomb
8. Crash Landing
9. Web of the Spider
10. Marauding Monster
11. Operation Rescue

Season 6: Black Island (12 episodes)

1. Black Island
2. Miscarriage of Justice
3. Escape
4. Intrigue
5. Mad Men
6. Trapped
7. Murderous Müller
8. Inferno
9. The Ghost of Black Island
10. Fright in the Night
11. The Beast of Black Island
12. The Battle of Black Island

Season 7: The Calculus Case (13 episodes)

1. Frightening Lightning
2. Z Rays
3. Kidnapped
4. Midnight Fright
5. Steel Shark
6. Tracked
7. Operation Opera
8. Bordurian Bullets
9. Dead End
10. Doomed
11. The Big Blast
12. Surprise in the Skies
13. Tank Attack

== See also ==
- List of French animated television series
- List of French television series
