= Le Thermozéro =

Abandoned comics project by Belgian cartoonist Hergé

Tintin et le Thermozéro
- Date: 1960
- Series: The Adventures of Tintin (Les aventures de Tintin)
- Publisher: Casterman

Creative team
- Writers: Hergé, Greg
- Artists: Hergé

Original publication
- Language: French

Translation

Le Thermozéro is an abandoned comics project at one point considered for Hergé's The Adventures of Tintin series, and then, later, for his Jo, Zette and Jocko series.

== Synopsis ==
On a rainy day, Haddock, Tintin and Calculus have a car accident with a German with whom they had words a few minutes before. Tintin, ready to help people, draws him out of his car and covers him with his coat. Surprisingly, many people try to put the man in their own car before the ambulance arrives. He hides an object in Tintin's coat without anyone's knowledge. Finally, the ambulance arrives and everyone goes home. Back at the hotel, Calculus decides to bring Tintin's coat to the laundry. A few days later, Tintin and the Captain discover that everyone present at the accident has been burgled. Apparently, the people behind all this are looking for an item that previously belonged to the victim. The next day, Haddock is kidnapped and the message for the ransom is "Haddock for the item". A meeting is set in Berlin. Though unaware of what the item is, the heroes travel to Germany to get Haddock back. With a case in his hand, Tintin meets the kidnappers. A few minutes later they are all jailed, as Tintin's case carried a transmitter. Back in Marlinspike, Calculus discovers the item (an explosive that functions in spaces without oxygen) cannot work as one ingredient is missing.

== History ==
In 1960, shortly after completing Tintin in Tibet, Hergé began developing a plot line on the basis of a December 1957 article from Marie-France. Written by Philippe Labro, the article was titled "La Peur qui vient du futur" ("The Fear from the Future") and told the story of two American families who had been exposed to high levels of radioactivity after breaking a pill. He jotted down a number of notes about the proposed story:

A bottle (or some other object) containing a deadly substance (atomic pills? See Marie-France) has been carried off (by mistake) by someone. Tintin pursues the fellow and finds him just as the substance in question is about to unleash its damaging effects.

He turned the project over to staff at Studios Hergé to work on, with the cartoonist Greg developing two plot synopsis for two stories, Les Pilules ("The Pills") and Tintin et le Thermozéro ("Tintin and the Thermozero"). Hergé took the latter project and produced eight pages of pencil drawings for it. However, Hergé was uncomfortable with working on a story already plotted out by someone else, commenting that:

I felt like a prisoner in a straitjacket unable to get out. Personally, I need to be constantly surprised by my own inventions. Besides, my stories are always created in the same way. I know my starting point, and I know more or less where I want to end up, but the route I take to get there depends on my whim of the moment.

According to Hergé biographer Benoît Peeters, the problem with Greg's outlines was that he had "absorbed the style of The Adventures of Tintin to the point of imitating it."

Unwilling to abandon a good idea, Hergé planned to make Le Thermozéro the plot of the third filmed adventure of Tintin but once again, this did not take place.

Bob de Moor, Hergé's assistant, was asked to change the synopsis and make it the sixth Jo, Zette and Jocko adventure. After a few sketches were made this project fell through as well, as Hergé asked Bob de Moor to modernize The Black Island instead. Hergé then turned his attention to The Castafiore Emerald, which saw book publication in 1963.

In March 2014 it was revealed that de Moor had indeed written a complete script for Le Thermozéro and that more pages had been pencilled before the project was shelved. Tintin's publisher Casterman also announced plans to publish an edition of Le Thermozéro, possibly in the same vein as the other unfinished Tintin adventure Tintin and Alph-Art.

However, this was abandoned as the Hergé Foundation opposed Casterman's release of the book even in its current form, with Nick Rodwell reasoning in an interview that:

Because Hergé abandoned this project! He didn't want to continue this album. He didn't feel it in his gut. So, that's it. We're stopping there! It would be completely ridiculous. It's resurfacing now because Benoît Mouchart, the editorial director of Casterman, has encouraged the public in France and Belgium to write personally to Fanny to plead the case for this album that Hergé has not finished. But I find that completely idiotic.”
