= Musée Hergé =

Museum dedicated to the life and work of Belgian cartoonist Hergé

Hergé Museum
- Musée Hergé
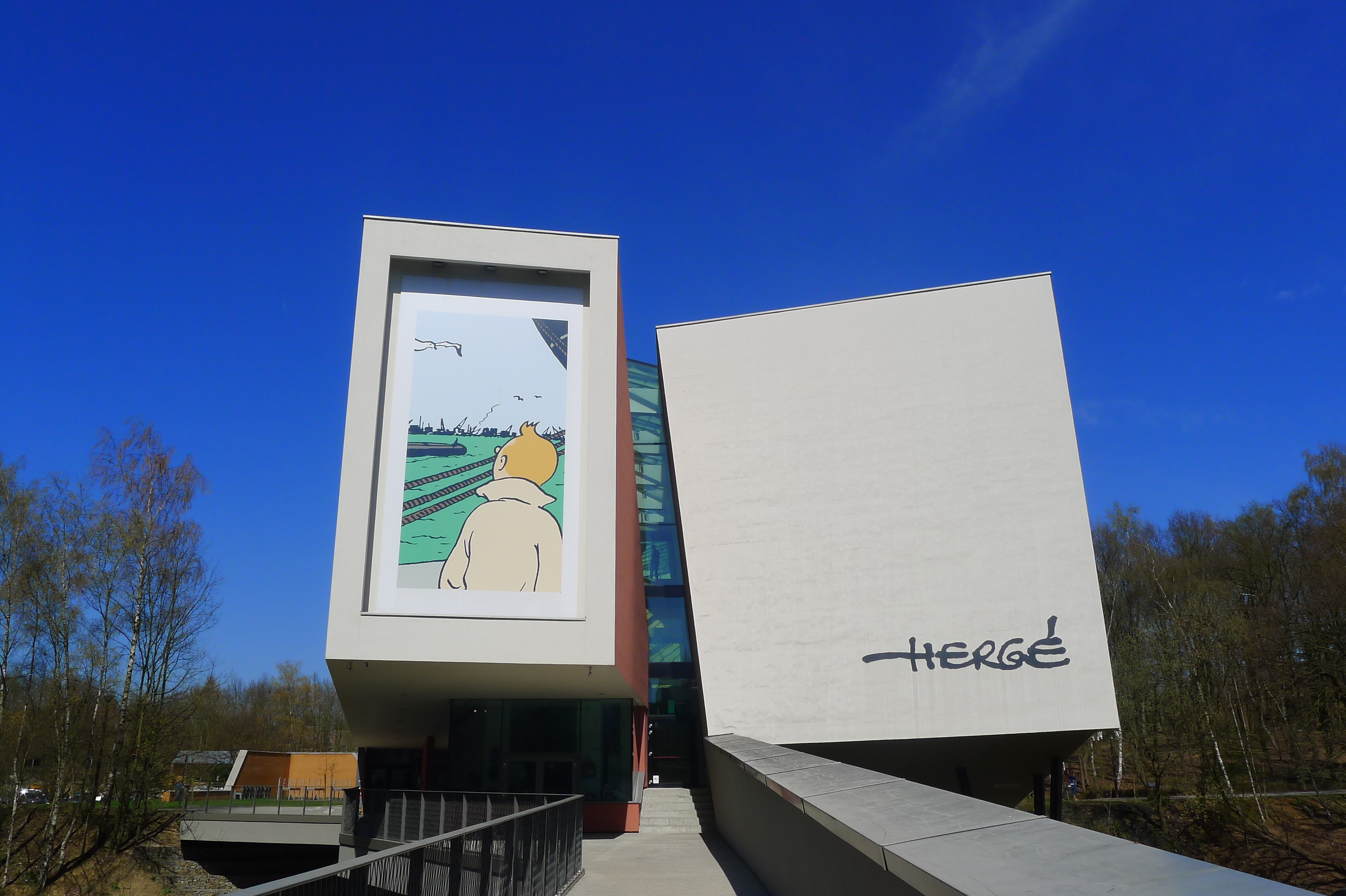
- The walking bridge approach to the Musée Hergé

- The Musée Hergé's location within Belgium
- Established: 2 June 2009
- Location: Rue Labrador 26; 1348 Louvain-la-Neuve, Belgium
- Coordinates: 50.671115°N 4.612809°E
- Architect: Christian de Portzamparc
- Owner: La Croix de l’Aigle
- Website: www.museeherge.com

The Musée Hergé, or Hergé Museum, is a museum in Louvain-la-Neuve, Belgium, dedicated to the life and work of the cartoonist Georges Remi, who wrote under the pen name Hergé, creator of the series of comic albums The Adventures of Tintin, Quick & Flupke and The Adventures of Jo, Zette and Jocko.

The museum is located in the centre of Louvain-la-Neuve, on the edge of a green park, Le Parc de la Source. Its address is "Rue Labrador 26", Tintin's first home in the books. It was designed by the French architect Christian de Portzamparc, with interiors designed by the cartoonist Joost Swarte, and opened in June 2009. It consists of three floors with a total of nine exhibition rooms, a café, museum shop and mini cinema.

== History ==
The idea of a museum dedicated to the work of Hergé can be traced back to the end of the 1970s, when Hergé himself was still alive. After his death in 1983, Hergé's widow, Fanny, led the efforts, undertaken at first by the Hergé Foundation and then by the new Studios Hergé, to catalogue and choose the artwork and elements that would eventually become part of the Hergé Museum's exhibitions.

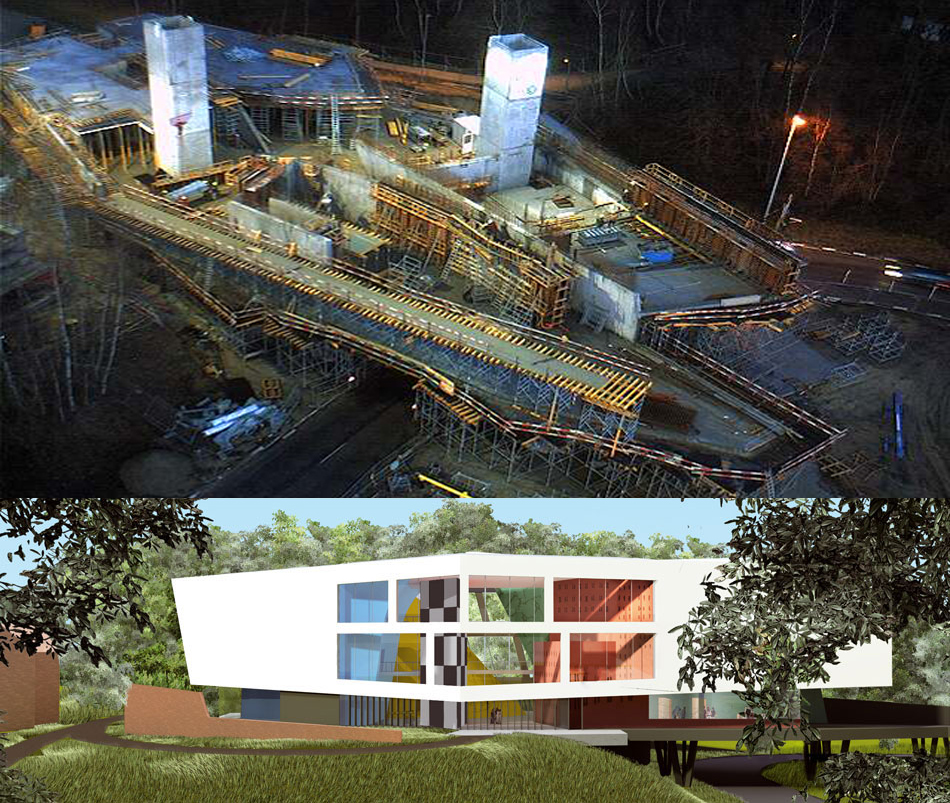
The Hergé Museum: concept and construction

The location for the Hergé Museum in Louvain-la-Neuve was originally chosen in 2001. The futuristic building was designed by the Pritzker Prize-winning French architect Christian de Portzamparc, with interiors designed by the cartoonist Joost Swarte. On 22 May 2007 (the centenary of Hergé's birth), the first stone of the museum was laid. Two years later, in June 2009, the museum opened its doors to the public.

During the museum's inauguration, journalists were informed of the museum's policy that no photos are allowed to be taken inside the museum to prevent "copyright abuse due to the work exposed". Disgruntled, some journalists left the museum. Journalists were allowed to photograph some parts of the museum when King Albert II toured the museum the following month. During the museum's first year, 100,000 visitors arrived.

In October 2013, it was announced that the museum was operating at a loss. Although the museum is entirely private and belongs to the Hergé Foundation which holds rights over Hergé's work, the owner, Nick Rodwell, requested financial assistance from the Belgian government.

Today, the museum is mainly visited by tourists.

== Museum ==
The Hergé Museum contains eight permanent galleries displaying original artwork by Hergé, and telling the story of his life and career. Although his most famous creation, The Adventures of Tintin, features prominently, his other comic strip characters (such as Jo, Zette and Jocko, and Quick and Flupke) are also present. The exhibitions also include examples of Hergé's diverse and prolific output working as a graphic designer in the 1930s.

Visitors begin at the top floor. The first room is dedicated to Hergé's life. The second room displays Hergé's many interests, his early commercial illustrations, and his early comics. Visitors then cross a long walkway, viewing the lobby on one side and an oak forest outside on the other. The third room introduces the world of Tintin, with nine glass vitrines dedicated to the main characters of the series. The fourth room focuses on Hergé and cinema. Moving down one floor, visitors enter the largest room in the museum, devoted to places in the world Tintin has travelled. Next to this is another large room of Professor Calculus' "laboratory", which focuses on science in the Tintin books. Crossing a lower bridge, visitors learn about Studios Hergé. The final room is called "Hergé Acclaimed", showing Hergé's connections to politicians, artists and philosophers.

The museum houses a temporary exhibition gallery on the main floor, which is updated every few months to host new exhibitions (with diverse titles such as Tintin, Hergé and Trains and Into Tibet with Tintin). Visitors are offered a three-hour narrated tour of the museum via headphones connected to an iPod.

== Controversies and criticism ==
When the building was unveiled to the press on 25 May 2009, they were not allowed to photograph or film any of the exhibits "to avoid a multitude of shots of the originals on display in the rooms". This provoked the anger of some journalists, who left the inauguration.

The construction of the Musée Hergé also led to the closure of the Maison des Jeunes de Louvain-la-Neuve, as the building it occupied on the outskirts of the museum's present site was demolished. Since then, the Maison des Jeunes has found a new home a few steps away, on the voie des Hennuyers.

The museum has been accused of catering to die-hard fans at the expense of other groups.

Some media noted that the museum lacks a critical view on Hergé. German news outlet Die Welt wrote upon the opening of the museum that "[...] we only learn [about Hergé] in Louvain what his sole heiress and widow Fanny Rodwell wants to let us know. According to the countless private black-and-white photographs and exhibition texts, Hergé [...] was a very smart, cheerful man, sociable, with a large circle of friends and an enormous creative power (which certainly no one disputes). The visitor learns absolutely nothing about his sympathies for Brussels' racist policies in the Belgian Congo and Nazi Germany — which the artist later openly regretted — about his partially reactionary, strictly Catholic upbringing or even about his severe depression."

== See also ==
- List of museums in Belgium
- List of single-artist museums
