= Christian de Portzamparc =

French architect and urbanist

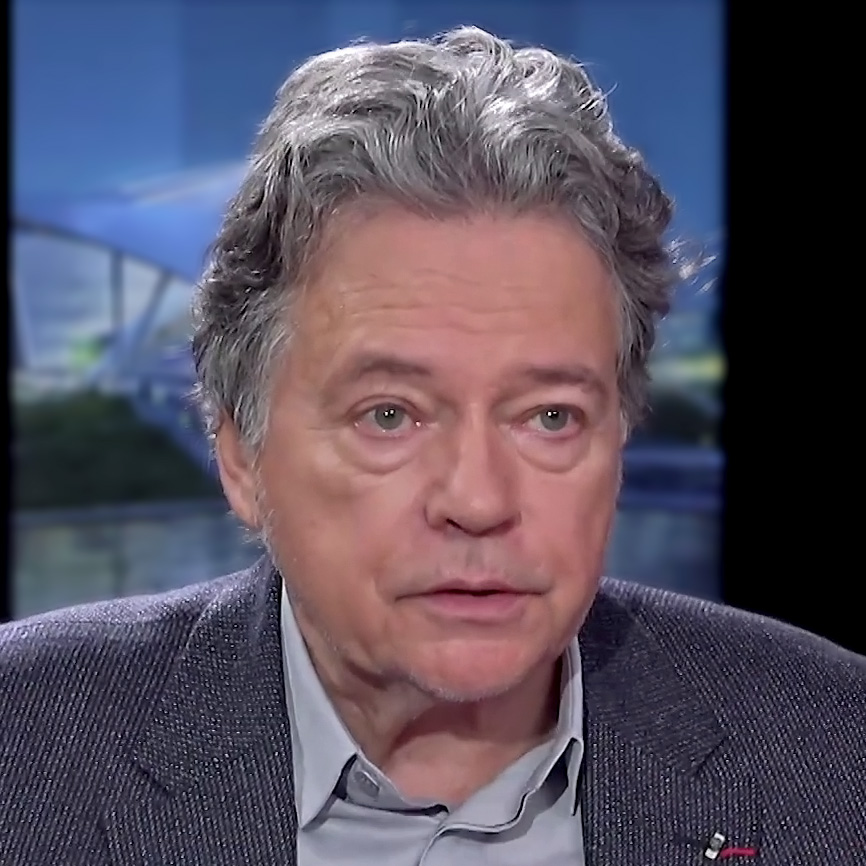
- Born: 5 May 1944 (age 82); Casablanca, Morocco
- Occupation: Architect
- Awards: 1994 Pritzker Prize; 2004 Grand Prix de l'urbanisme
- Website: www.portzamparc.com

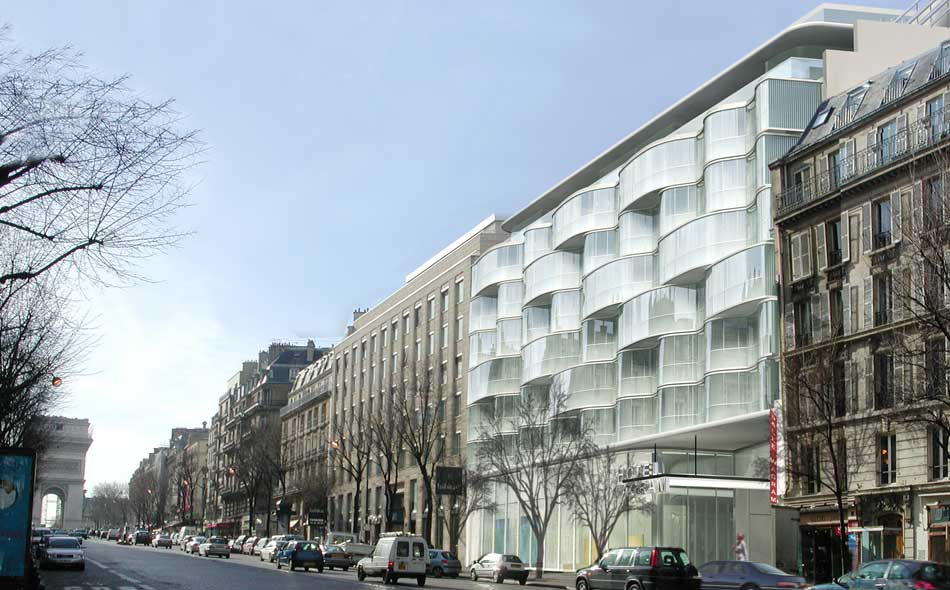
2003–2008 Hotel Renaissance Wagram in Paris

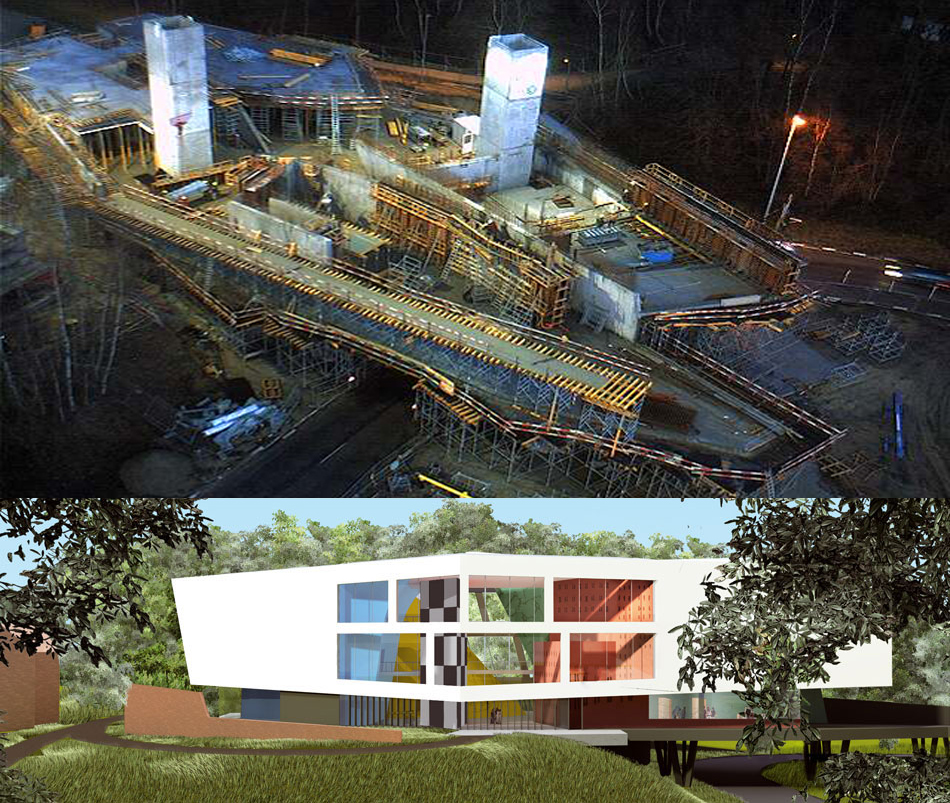
2001–2009 Hergé museum, Louvain-la-Neuve in Belgium

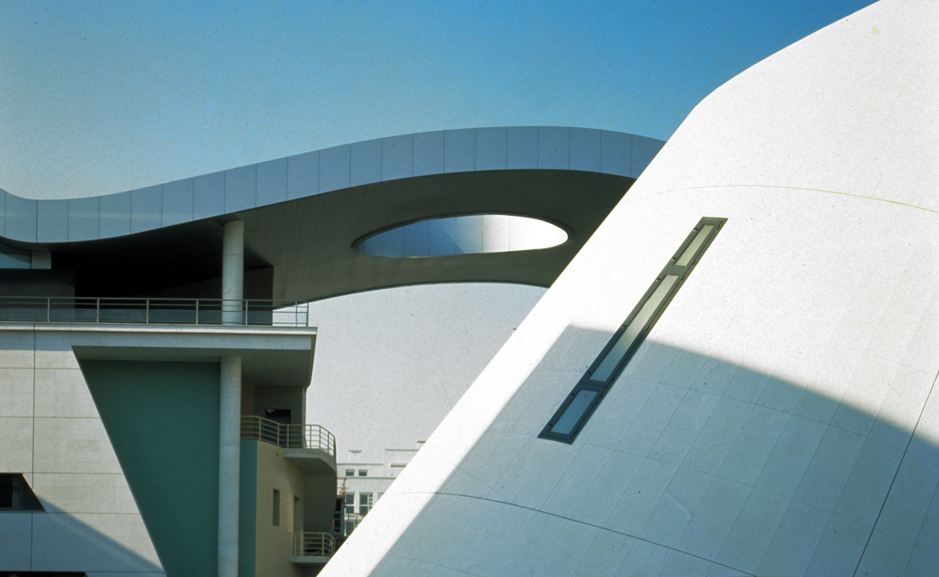
1984–1995 The City of Music in Paris

2011–2015 House of Dior Seoul

Christian de Portzamparc (French pronunciation: [kʁistjɑ̃ də pɔʁtzɑ̃paʁk]; born 5 May 1944) is a French architect and urbanist.

He graduated from the École Nationale des Beaux Arts in Paris in 1970. His projects reflect a sensibility to their environment and to urbanism that is a founding principle of his work.

In 1994, he was awarded the Pritzker Prize.

== Life and career ==
De Portzamparc was born in Casablanca, Morocco in 1944, when it was a French protectorate to a family of Breton noble descent. He began studying architecture in 1962 at the École nationale supérieure des Beaux-Arts in Paris where he was influenced by professor Eugène Beaudouin, who "encouraged his taste for formal expressionism", and professor George Candilis, who "emphasized systematic work on grids and networks." In 1966, he traveled to New York during a nine-month academic hiatus that was rooted in his hesitations about continuing in architecture. He remarked, "Architecture seemed to me to be too bureaucratic, and not free enough compared to art; and the modernistic ideals which I worshiped before, seemed to me unable to reach the richness of real life. I also began to criticize my first influences like Le Corbusier". Nevertheless, he returned to his studies in the 1967 academic year and graduated from the Beaux-Arts in 1969. De Portzamparc created his agency in 1980, supported by Marie-Élisabeth Nicoleau, Étienne Pierrès and Bertrand Beau, and later welcomed Bruno Durbecq, Céline Barda, Léa Xu, André Terzibachian and Clovis Cunha. Based in Paris, the agency has 'satellite' offices near building sites, in addition to offices in New York and Rio de Janeiro. The office is made up of a team of 80 people, drawn from all corners of the globe.

As both an architect and urban planner, Christian de Portzamparc is implicated in the research of form and meaning, as well as being a constructer. His work focuses on research over speculation and concerns the quality of life; aesthetics are conditioned by ethics, and he maintains that we have too often dissociated one from the other. Christian de Portzamparc focuses on all scales of construction, from simple buildings to urban re-thinking. The town is a central principal of his work, developing in parallel and in crossover along three major lines: neighborhood or city pieces, individual buildings and sky-scrapers.

Christian de Portzamparc developed the "open block" as a new urban structure in the 1980s which can be seen today in projects such as the Quartier Masséna – Seine Rive Gauche (since 1995), an entire neighborhood of Paris, and at La Lironde (since 1991), in the south of France, both of which illustrate his master-planning and coordination techniques.

Christian de Portzamparc's buildings create environments wherein the interior and exterior spaces interpenetrate, working as catalysts in cityscape dynamics. This method of functioning came into play in major cultural programs, often dedicated to dance and music. The most recent examples of which include a 1,500-seat philharmonic hall, 300 seat chamber hall and 120 seat electro-acoustic hall in Luxembourg, completed in 2005, plus a unique 1,800-seat concert hall that transforms into a 1,300-seat opera house, which is under construction, amongst other music halls, as part of the project Cidade da Música in Rio de Janeiro, Brazil.

The towers created by Christian de Portzamparc have, since the beginning, been a result of his studies of the vertical and sculptural dimension, concentrating on the prismatic form, the most recognized example of which is the LVMH Tower created in 1995 in New York, USA, for which Christian de Portzamparc received many accolades, soon to be accompanied by the residential tower at 400 Park avenue in Manhattan, whose construction commenced in 2010.

In 1994, Christian de Portzamparc became the first French architect to gain the prestigious "Pritzker Architectural Prize", at the age of 50.

In 1999, he created the twenty-three story LVMH Tower on East 57th Street in New York City and, later, the LVMH's corporate headquarters on Avenue Montaigne in Paris, France.

In 2006, the Collège de France created a 53rd chair dedicated 'artistic creation', and called on Christian de Portzamparc to be its first occupant.

== Principal completed projects ==
- 1971–1974 Château d'Eau, Marne la Vallée
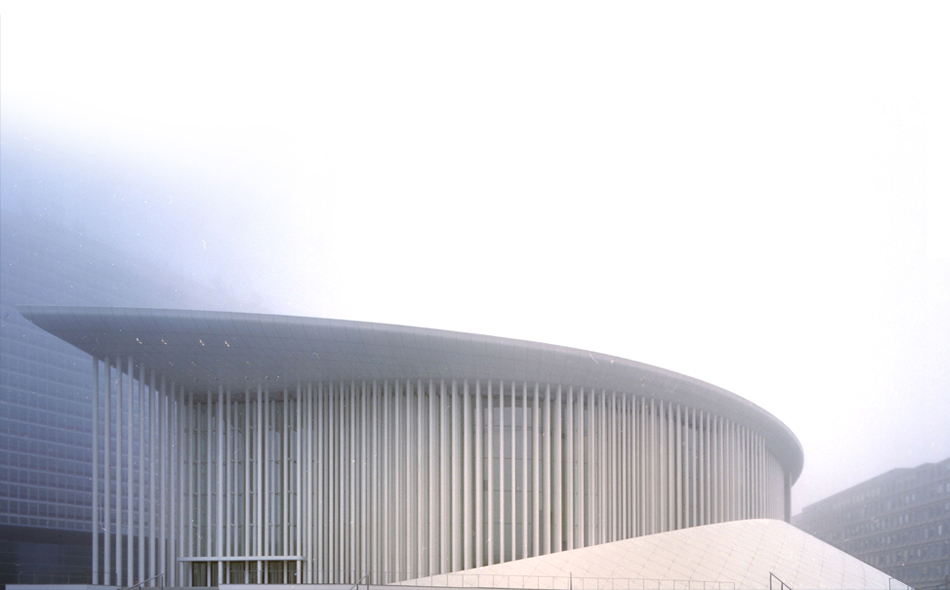
  Philharmonie Luxembourg (1997–2005)
- 1975–1979 Les Hautes-Formes housing project, Paris
- 1983–1987 Paris Opera Ballet School, Nanterre
- 1985–1987 Beaubourg Cafe, Paris
- 1988–1990 Musée Bourdelle, Paris
- 1989–1991 Nexus II, Fukuoka, Japan
- 1984–1995 The City of Music, Paris
- 1991–1995 Tour de Lille, Lille
- 1993–1999 Law courts, Courts of Justice, Grasse
- 1993–2006 Centre of science, library and museum "Les Champs Libres", Rennes
- 1994–1999 Extension of the Palais des Congrès Porte Maillot, Paris
- 1995–1999 LVMH Tower, New York
- 1997–2003 Embassy of France, Berlin
- 2001–2004 Headquarters for the press group Le Monde, Paris
- 1997–2005 Philharmonie Luxembourg
- 2000–2006 "De Citadel", housing and commercial center Almere
- 2003–2013 Concert halls, cinema, school of music Cidade da Musica, Rio de Janeiro
- 2007–2009 Musée Hergé, Louvain-la-Neuve, Belgium
- 2011–2013 One57, a 75-story hotel/condominium tower in New York City
- 2011–2015 Flaghip Dior in Seoul
- 2013–2017 Paris La Défense Arena, new home to the Racing 92 rugby team in Nanterre

== Main projects achieved ==
- 1991–2009 Development of the Lironde Gardens and construction of two Montpellier blocks
- 1995–2009 Urban development of the Masséna district, Paris
- 1998–2009 Croix Rousse Hospital, Lyon
- 2001–2008 Société Générale towers, La Défense, Paris
- 2002–2009 "400 Park Avenue South" residential tower in Manhattan, New York
- 2003–2008 Renaissance Paris Wagram Hotel, Paris
- 2006–2009 Regional hall, Hôtel de Région Rhône Alpes, Lyon
- 2004–2008 Multiplex Europalaces-Gaumont, Rennes
- 2004–2008 Residential development "La prairie au Duc", Nantes
- 2004–2008 Bastide residential development in Bordeaux
- 2011–2015 Amphitheater District in Metz

== Awards and distinctions ==
- 1988 – Equerre d'Argent – awarded by the press group Le Moniteur for the Dance School of the Paris Opera in Nanterre
- 1989 – Commander of the Order of Arts and Letters – awarded by the French Ministry of Culture
- 1990 – The Great Prize of Architecture of the City of Paris – awarded by the Mayor of Paris
- 1992 – Médaille d'Argent – awarded by the French Academy of Architecture
- 1993 – Great National Prize of Architecture – awarded by the French Ministry of Urbanism and Transport
- 1994 – Pritzker Prize of Architecture – awarded by the Hyatt Foundation
- 1995 – Equerre d'Argent awarded by the French press group Le Moniteur for the City of Music – Conservatory of Music and Dance in Paris
- 2001 – Businessweek and Architectural Record Award for the LVMH Tower in New York (USA)
- 2004 – The Great Prize of Urbanism – awarded by an international jury who wanted to congratulate a work with achievements of high quality combined with city vision and philosophy articulating theoretical concepts and concrete realizations, while developing an optimistic vision for the future through his works and writings
- 2005 – MIPIM Award for the remodeling of the building for the press group Le Monde in Paris
- 2018 - Praemium Imperiale

== Publications and biographies ==
- Exhibition catalogue «Rêver la ville», Sophie Trelcat, Paris, Le Moniteur, 2007
- Architecture: figures du monde, figures du temps, Leçons inaugurales au Collège de France, Collège de France/Fayard, Paris, 2006
- Voir écrire, Christian de Portzamparc & Philippe Sollers, Paris, Folio Gallimard, 2005
- Christian de Portzamparc by Gilles de Bure Edited by Terrail, 2003
- Christian de Portzamparc, entretien avec Y. Futagawa, G.A. Document extra 04 / in Studio Talk interview with 15 architects (Tokyo, A.D.A edita, 2002
- Christian de Portzamparc by Riccardo Florio, Edited by Officina Edizioni, 1997
- Christian de Portzamparc G.A. Document, 1996
- Christian de Portzamparc Disegno e forma dell'architettura per la città, R.Florio (Roma, Officina Edizioni, 1996)
- Généalogie des formes by Christian de Portzamparc, Edited by Dis Voir, about free drawings and paintings, 1996
- Christian de Portzamparc Edited by Arc en Rêve/ Birkhauser, 1996
- Scènes d'Atelier Edited by Centre Georges Pompidou, 1996
- Christian de Portzamparc by Jean Pierre Le Dantec Edited by Le Regard, 1996
- Christian de Portzamparc Urban situations Edited by Gallery MA - Tokyo - Japan 1991
- Christian de Portzamparc Published by Le Moniteur, 1984–1987

== Books on projects ==
- La philharmonie de Luxembourg, entretien avec C. de Portzamparc, M. Brausch. (Luxembourg, Fonds d'Urbanisation et d'Aménagement du Plateau de Kirchberg, 2003)
- La tour LVMH, entretien avec C. de Portzamparc «Portzamparc ou l'esprit des lieux». «Christian de Portzamparc The LVMH Tower», J. Giovannini, F.Rambert, (Connaissance des Arts hors série, Paris, 1999)
- De la danse - école du ballet de L'Opéra de Paris, C. de Portzamparc (Paris, Les éditions du Demi-Cercle, 1990)
- La cité de la musique, M. Bleuse, P. Boulez, S. Goldberg, J-C. Casadesus, O. Messiaen, P. Sollers, H. Tonka, C. de Portzamparc (Paris, Champ Vallon, 1986)
- Rue des Hautes Formes, C. de Portzamparc (Paris, Régie immobilière de la ville de Paris, RIVP, 1979)
