= Planning Perspectives =

- Discipline: City planning, history
- Language: English
- Edited by: John R. Gold, Margaret Gold

Publication details
- History: 1986-present
- Publisher: Routledge
- Frequency: Quarterly
- Impact factor: 0.963 (2020)

Standard abbreviations
- ISO 4: Plan. Perspect.

Indexing
- ISSN: 0266-5433 (print); 1466-4518 (web)

Links
- Journal homepage; Online access; Online archive

Planning Perspectives is a bi-monthly peer-reviewed academic journal of history, planning, and the environment. It is affiliated with the International Planning History Society and is published by Routledge. In 2022 the editors-in-chief are John R. Gold (Department of Social Sciences, Oxford Brookes University) and Margaret Gold (Guildhall School of Business and Law, London Metropolitan University). The editor for the Americas is Stephen J. Ramos (University of Georgia, USA). The IPHS editor is Carola Hein (TU Delft-Faculty of Architecture and the Built Environment)

== Abstracting and indexing ==
The journal is abstracted/indexed in Arts and Humanities Citation Index, Current Contents/Arts & Humanities, Social Sciences Citation Index, Journal Citation Reports/Social Sciences Edition, Current Contents/Social and Behavioral Sciences, IBZ International Bibliography of Periodical Literature (Zeller Verlag), Sage Urban Studies Abstracts, Geo Abstracts, Journal of Planning Literature, University of West England Library Services, America: History & Life, Architectural Publications Index, Avery Index to Architectural Periodicals, Current Abstracts, Historical Abstracts, EbscoHost, SCOPUS and Dietrich's Index Philosophicus. According to the Journal Citation Reports, the journal has a 2020 impact factor of 0.963.
