= Louvain-la-Neuve =

Louvain-la-Neuve Li Noû Lovén (Walloon)
- Planned city
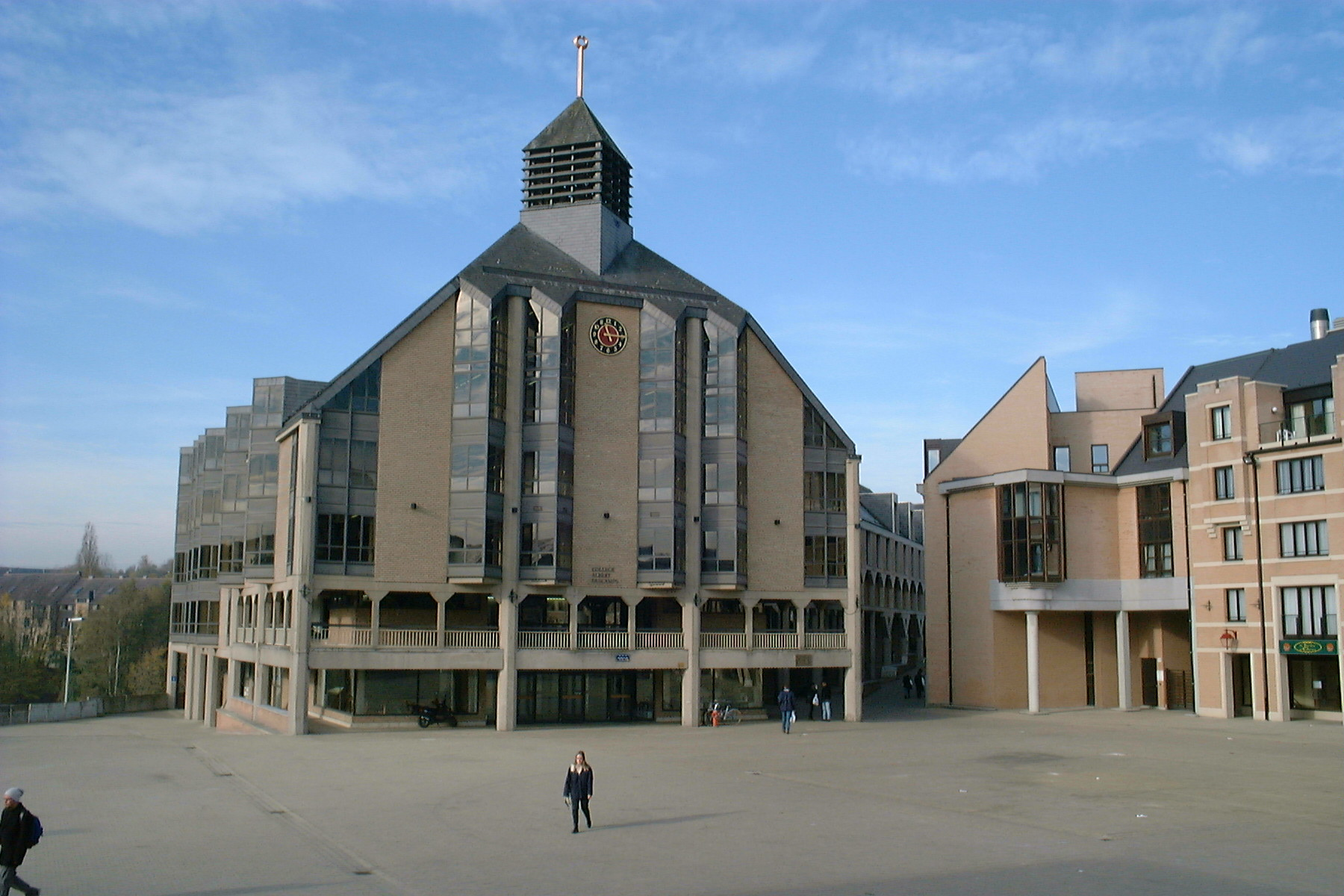
- Main Square of Louvain-la-Neuve

- Flag

- Location within Walloon Brabant
- Coordinates: 50°40′04″N 4°36′42″E
- Country: Belgium
- Region: Wallonia
- Province: Walloon Brabant
- Arrondissement: Nivelles
- Municipality: Ottignies-Louvain-la-Neuve

Area
  - Total: 32.96 km^{2} (12.73 sq mi)

Population (2006)
  - Total: 29,521
  - Density: 895.7/km^{2} (2,320/sq mi)

Louvain-la-Neuve (French: [luvɛ̃ la nœv]; French for "New Leuven"; Walloon: Li Noû Lovén) is a planned town in the municipality of Ottignies-Louvain-la-Neuve, Wallonia, Belgium, situated 30 km southeast of Brussels, in the province of Walloon Brabant. The town was built to house the Université catholique de Louvain (UCLouvain) which owns the entire territory of the town; following the linguistic quarrels that took place in Belgium during the 1960s, and Flemish claims of discrimination at the Catholic University of Leuven, the institution was split into the Dutch-language Katholieke Universiteit Leuven (KU Leuven), which remained in Leuven, and the Université catholique de Louvain.

To a great extent, it still lives following the rhythms of the university that is its raison d'être. However, with the construction of L'Esplanade shopping complex, the Aula Magna exhibition centre and auditorium, a large cinema complex, and five museums, it is beginning to grow beyond its academic roots.

== History ==
=== Language crisis ===
Louvain-la-Neuve was born as a result of the Leuven Crisis, which led to the split of the Catholic University of Leuven. Following the elections prompted by this affair, the expansion of the French-speaking part of the Catholic University of Leuven was voted upon and approved on 18 June 1968. A few weeks later, the separation was made official. It resulted in the creation of the Katholieke Universiteit Leuven (KU Leuven), the Dutch-speaking university, that would stay in Leuven, and the Université catholique de Louvain (UCLouvain), which had to move to the future site of Louvain-la-Neuve, except for the French-speaking medical faculty, which moved to Woluwe-Saint-Lambert (often called "Louvain-en-Woluwe"), in the suburbs of Brussels. The first blueprints of Louvain-la-Neuve were made in a hurry and under dramatic times.

=== Construction ===
After much deliberation, the university administration agreed on a building site near the town of Ottignies, in the French-speaking part of the Province of Brabant (today's Walloon Brabant). They bought a 9 km^{2} plot of beetroot farmland, which became the site from which the new town would arise. Construction started on 20 January 1969.

Put under the direction of Raymond M. Lemaire, Jean-Pierre Blondel and Pierre Laconte, this urbanistic project saw the first students and inhabitants arrive in 1972. At this time, there were only around 600 permanent residents of the town, who were joined during the day by some students of Applied Sciences, the first faculty to open. With the completion of university buildings and the ongoing residential development, the town experienced rapid growth, with 10,477 inhabitants recorded in 1981. The final goal is to reach 30,000 inhabitants, in addition to the 15,000 students living in town during the academic year.

The town was created with the sole purpose of hosting the Université catholique de Louvain (UCLouvain). As such all the grounds are property of the university. Consequently, the university was able to play an important role in the conception and planning of the town. They decided that the town should not be only inhabited by students, but rather draw a diverse community as is found in any classic town. Moreover, one of the main points of the urban design of Louvain-la-Neuve was to make it people- rather than automobile-centred. As a consequence, the town centre is built on a gigantic concrete slab, with all motorized traffic travelling underground. This allows most of the ground level of the town centre to be car-free. Most buildings are built on the slab (la dalle), and the pedestrian area is expanding even far from the town centre featuring many mixed use overpasses and traffic calming solutions. This constitutes an early example of the 15-minute city, with the Agora, Main square and train station in a tight central triangle reachable by foot within 15 to 20 minutes from the outermost districts.

== Description ==
The town is clustered around this center in four districts: Biéreau, Lauzelle, Hocaille and Bruyères. A fifth district, Baraque, that was not planned by the university has expanded on the north side of the town. It is distinct from the rest of the town in the willingness of its inhabitants to live outside of the common architectural framework (small cobblestoned and pedestrian streets) used in the other parts of the town.

Louvain-la-Neuve's location 30 km (19 mi) south of Brussels at the crosspoint of several important roads makes it easily reachable by car. Moreover, a train extension has been built from the nearby station of Ottignies, which allows passengers to travel to or from Brussels in under an hour.

Due to the large student population that leaves the town during weekends and holidays, Louvain-la-Neuve can be quite empty during those periods. Nevertheless, the student life both day and night is well developed, centered around Student Unions, "project flats" ("kot-à-projet"), regional pubs, etc.

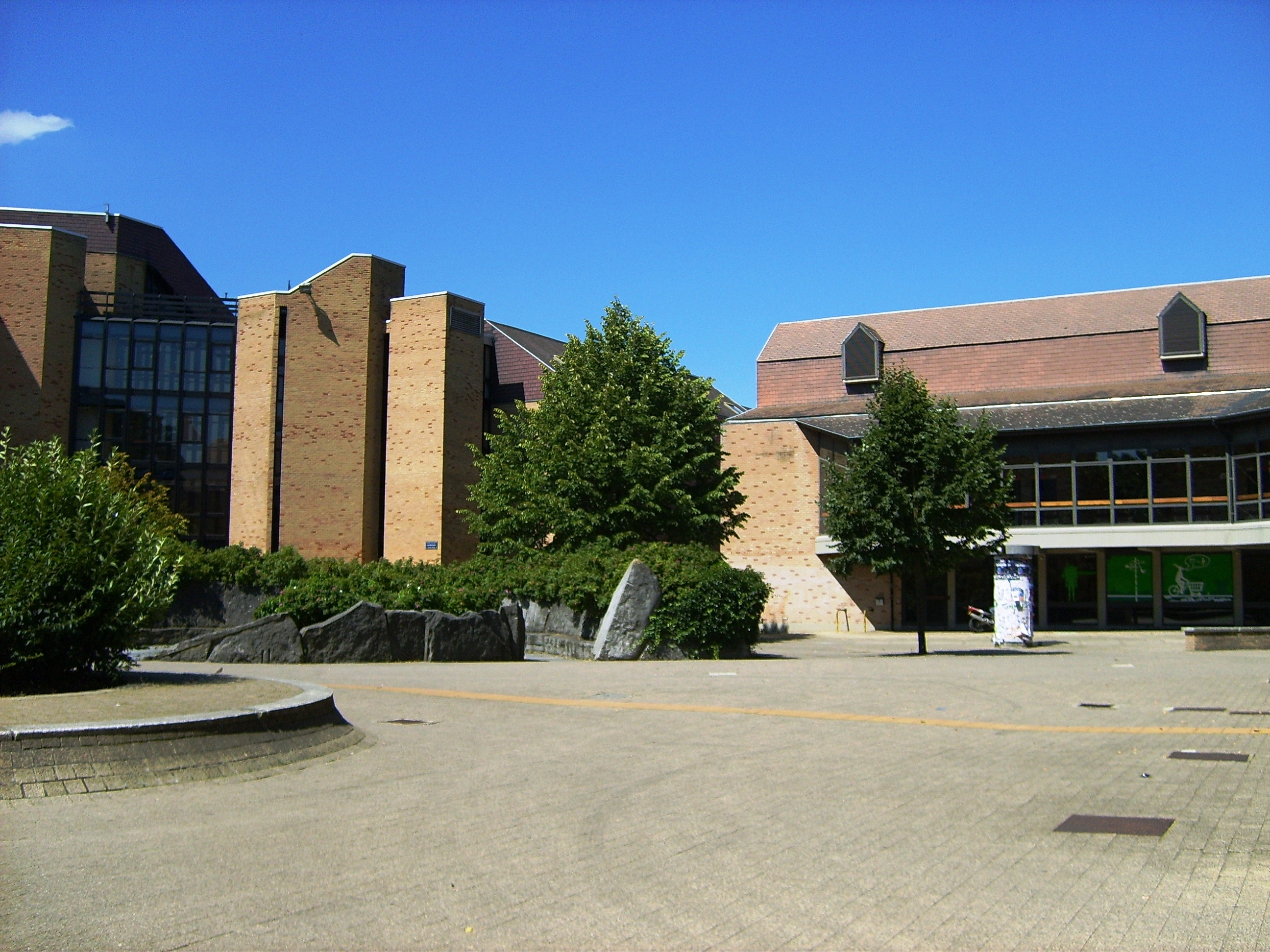
Place Montesquieu

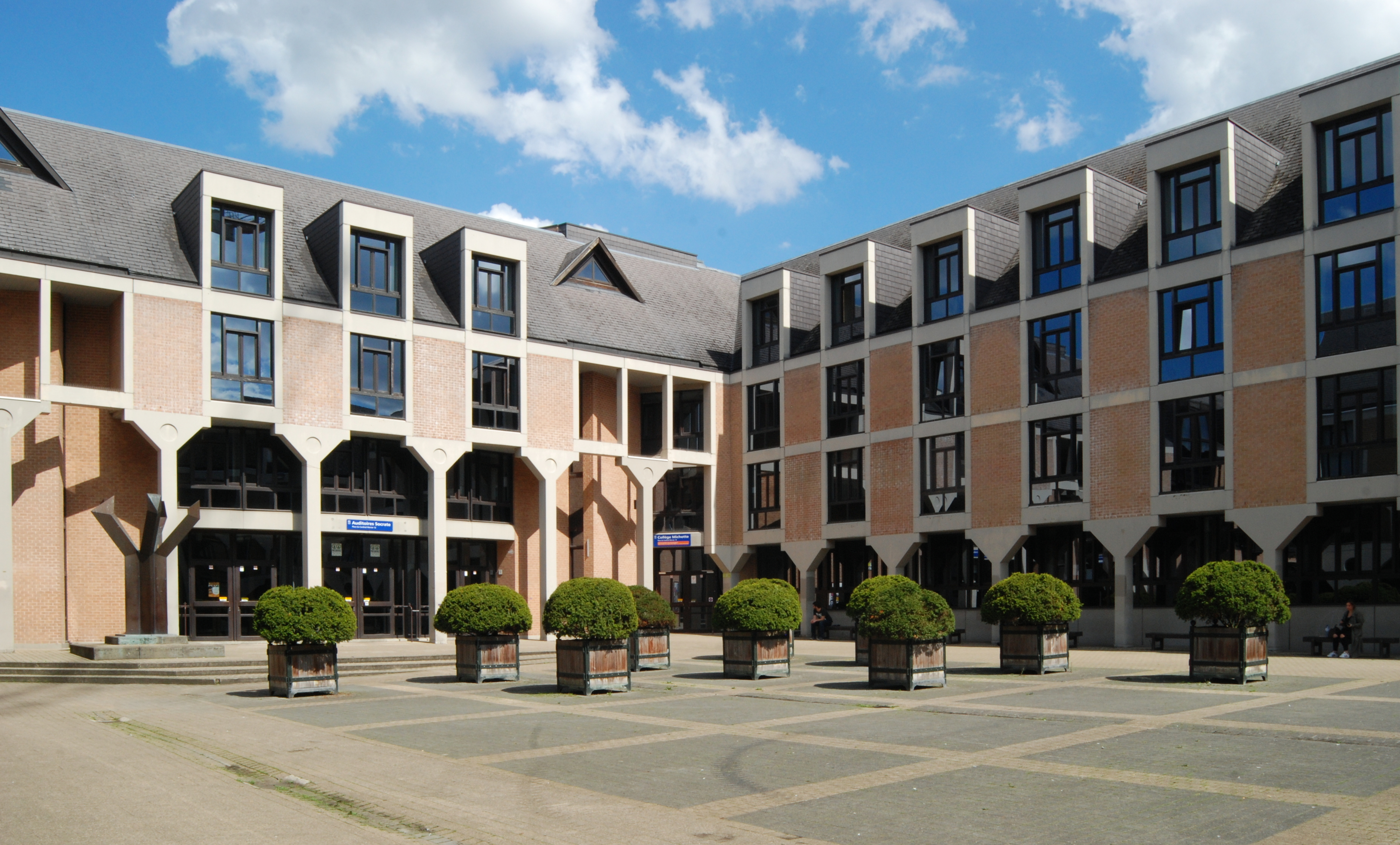
Place Cardinal Mercier

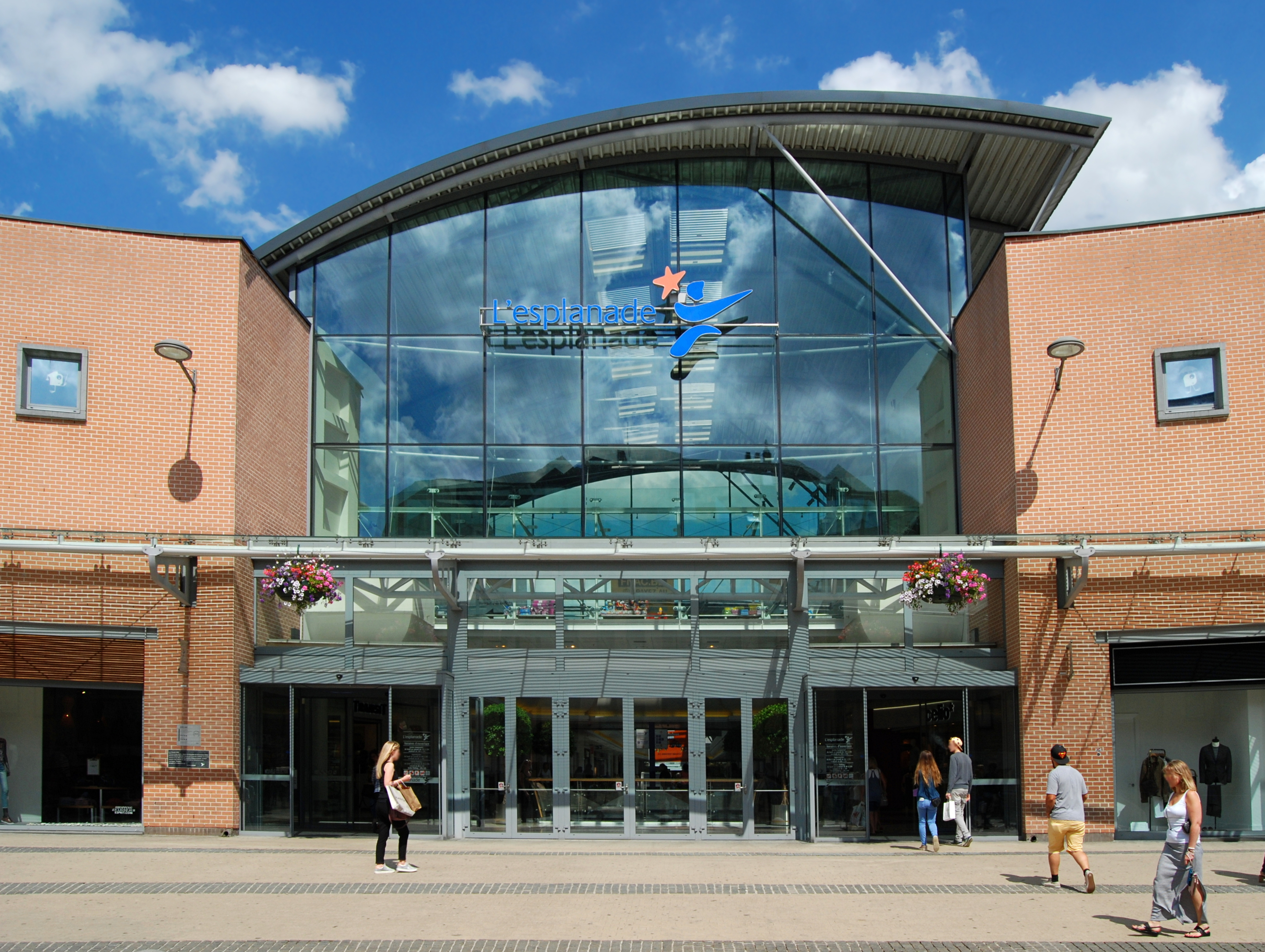
L'Esplanade shopping complex

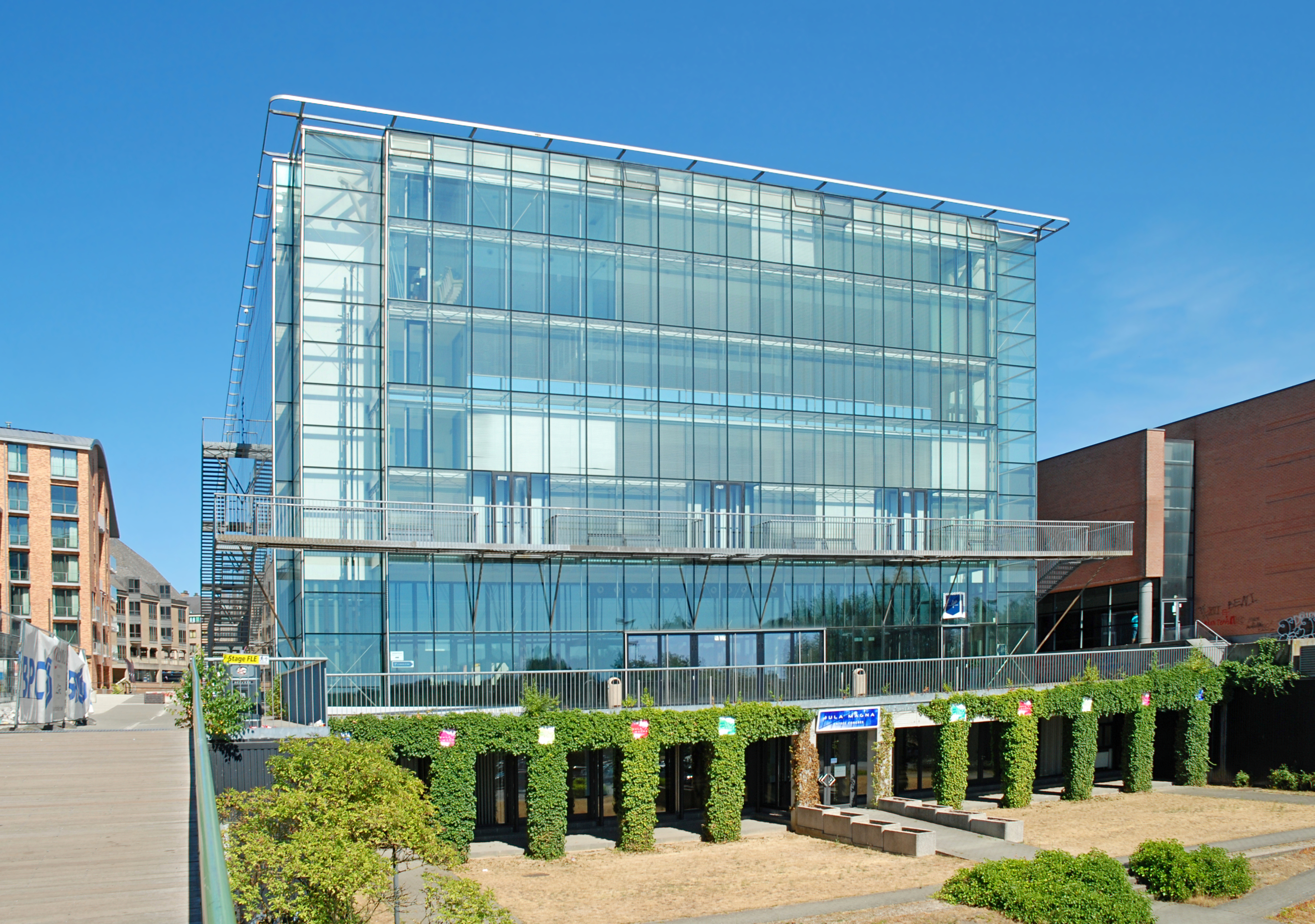
Aula Magna exhibition centre and auditorium

== The 24 heures vélo ==
Celebrating its 40th edition in 2017, the 24 heures vélo (24-hour bike ride) is the biggest student party in Belgium. The event, which regularly draws upwards of 40,000 students to the city, is organized by a student group called the CSE Animations (Centre Sportif Etudiant) and runs annually from 1:00 p.m. Wednesday to 1:00 p.m. Thursday usually during the fourth week of October. Due to the recent terrorist attacks in Europe and the existing risk of new ones, the 2016 edition was cancelled.

The starting concept was simple: to race for 24 hours on a bike. Nowadays, competitors are separated in three categories: racers, that race seriously; folk bikes, including decorated bikes and home built contraptions; and charity racers raising money for humanitarian causes.

The festival is an occasion for the numerous student associations in the town to compete in building silly bikes, set up some related activity, or simply provide beer and music to the tens of thousands of students coming from all over Belgium.

In the morning, the activities end with a concert by a famous singer in the main square.

This event gives a hint at how student life and traditions have developed on the newly born campus, reviving some long lost customs as the traditional Catholic Belgian students hat, the calotte.

The ride has also been at the center of some more political issues. In 1999 it was cancelled due to the death of a drunken student who had fallen from the dalle in 1998. This happened again at the 2006 edition, when a student was found dead in the early morning in the streets of the dalle. The event was also threatened in 2005 and 2006 because of a student association strike and other organisation problems.

== Louvain-la-Neuve Science Park ==
Created in 1971, Louvain-la-Neuve Science Park is the first of its kind in Belgium and is the biggest one in Wallonia. It covers 2.31 square kilometres spread over the area of the town of Ottignies-Louvain-la-Neuve and the municipality of Mont-Saint-Guibert (30 km away from Brussels).

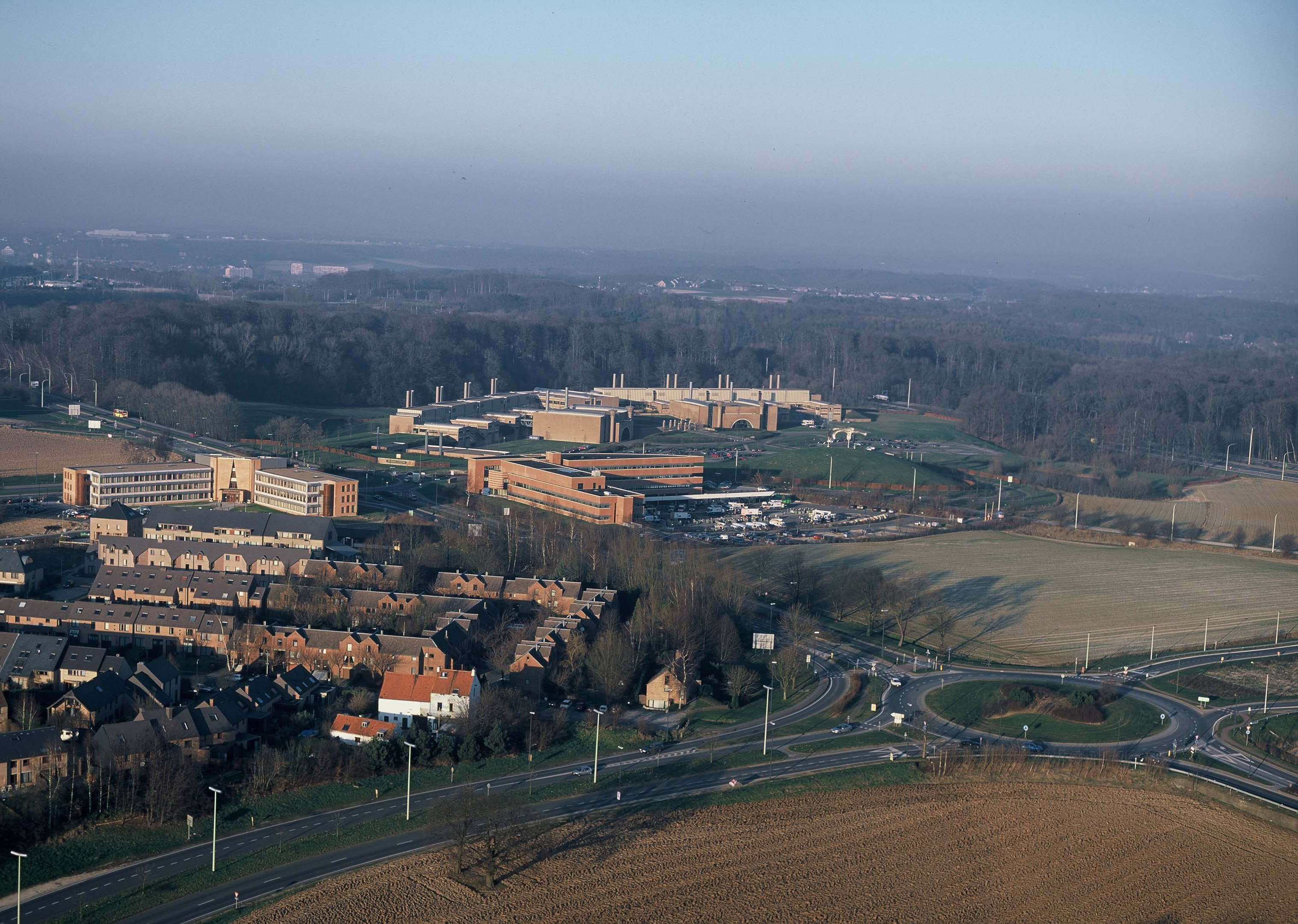
Louvain-la-Neuve Science Park, aerial view

From the outset, the objectives pursued by the development of Louvain-la-Neuve Science Park were to develop cooperation between industry and the Université catholique de Louvain and to contribute to regional economic development. Particular emphasis is placed on environmental-friendliness, as well as the quality of the premises and their surroundings.

The main area of activity are:

- Life sciences
- Fine chemistry
- Information technologies
- Engineering

Louvain-la-Neuve Science Park is now home to more than 130 innovative companies and their 4500 employees, 1 business incubator and 3 business centres.

== The Hergé Museum ==
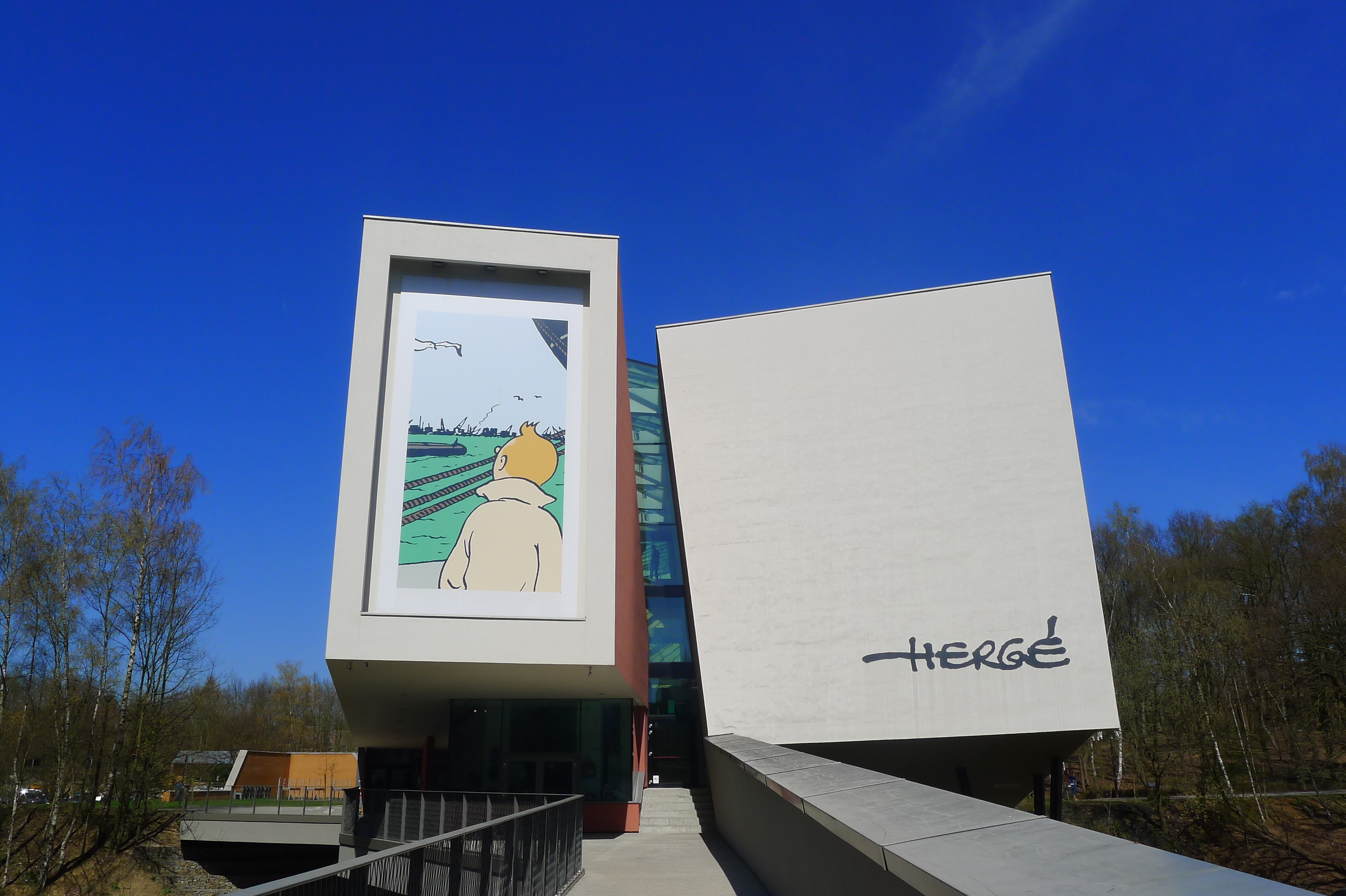
The Hergé Museum

The Hergé Museum is dedicated to the life and work of the Belgian cartoonist Georges Remi (1907–1983), who wrote under the pen name Hergé, creator of the series of comic albums, The Adventures of Tintin. It is located in the centre of Louvain-la-Neuve, on the edge of a green park, Le Parc de la Source. This location for the museum was originally chosen in 2001. The futuristic building was designed by the Pritzker Prize-winning French architect Christian de Portzamparc. On 22 May 2007 (the centenary of Hergé's birth), the first stone of the museum was laid. Two years later, in June 2009, the museum opened its doors to the public.

The Hergé Museum contains eight permanent galleries displaying original artwork by Hergé, and telling the story of his life and career. Although his most famous creation, The Adventures of Tintin, features prominently, his other comic strip characters (such as Jo, Zette and Jocko, and Quick and Flupke) are also present. The exhibitions also include examples of Hergé's diverse and prolific output working as a graphic designer in the 1930s. The museum houses a temporary exhibition gallery, which is updated every few months to host new exhibitions (with diverse titles such as Tintin, Hergé and Trains and Into Tibet with Tintin).

== See also ==
- Pierre Laconte: creation and development of Louvain-la-Neuve
- Catholic University of Leuven (1834–1968)
- Calotte (Belgium)
- Carmeuse, company
