= Carola Hein =

German urbanologist (born 1964)

- Born: 1964 (age 61–62); Hamburg, West Germany
- Occupation: Urbanologist
- Awards: Guggenheim Fellowship (2007)

Academic background
- Education: Hochschule für bildende Künste Hamburg
- Thesis: The Capital City of Europe (1995)

Academic work
- Discipline: Urban studies
- Sub-discipline: Capital cities; port cities
- Institutions: Bryn Mawr College; Delft University of Technology

Carola Hein (born 1964) is a German urbanologist. A 2007 Guggenheim Fellow, she has written and edited numerous books on urban studies, including Rebuilding Urban Japan after 1945 (2003) and Cities, Autonomy, and Decentralization in Japan (2006). She is Professor of History of Architecture and Urban Planning at the Delft University of Technology Department of Architecture.

== Biography ==
Hein was born in Hamburg in 1964, and became interested in architecture and architectural history during her youth. She studied architecture and urban planning at the Hochschule für bildende Künste Hamburg with a concentration on history and theory, obtaining a Diplom-Ingenieurin in 1990 and Doktoringenieurin in 1995. Her doctoral dissertation was The Capital City of Europe.

During the late-1990s, Hein worked as a visiting lecturer in Japan, particularly at Kogakuin University, Tokyo Metropolitan University, Tokyo University of Science, and Tsukuba University. In 1999, she joined Bryn Mawr College as an assistant professor. She was promoted to associate professor in 2005 and full professor in 2010. She moved to Delft University of Technology in 2014 and left Bryn Mawr in 2016. She became a full professor at Leiden University and Erasmus University in 2022.

Hein has written and edited numerous books on urban studies, specializing in architectural, urban planning, and issues related to capital cities. In 2007, she was awarded a Guggenheim Fellowship. She studied the geography of oil during her time in Bryn Mawr and TU Delft. At the 2008 International Conference of the Society for Human Ecology, she and Pierre Laconte won the Gerald Young Book Award for their book Brussels: Perspectives on a European Capital.

Another field of interest of Hein is the relationship between a port and its adjacent city, inspired by her experiences of living in one. She co-chaired the expert panel of the Association of Port Cities' Antoine Rufenacht Prize. In 2022, she was appointed UNESCO chair of water, ports and historic cities.

== Works ==
- Hauptstadt Berlin, internationaler städtebaulicher Ideenwettbewerb 1957/58 (1991)
- (ed. with Jeffry M. Diefendorf and Yorifusa Ishida) Rebuilding Urban Japan after 1945 (2003)
- European Brussels: Whose Capital? Whose City? Bruxelles l'Européenne. Capitale de qui? Ville de qui? (2006)
- (ed. with Philippe Pelletier) Cities, Autonomy, and Decentralization in Japan (2006)
- The Capital of Europe: Architecture and Urban Planning for the European Union (2004)
- (ed. with Pierre Laconte) Brussels: Perspectives on a European Capital (2006)
- (ed.) Port Cities: Dynamic Landscapes and Global Networks (2011)
- (ed.) History, Urbanism, Resilience, Proceedings of the 2016 IPHS conference (2016)
- Uzō Nishiyama, Reflections on Urban, Regional and National Space (2017)
- The Routledge Planning History Handbook (2018)
- Adaptive Strategies for Water Heritage (2020)
- Urbanisation of the Sea (2020)
- Oil Spaces (2021)
