= Louvain-la-Neuve 24-hour cycling event =

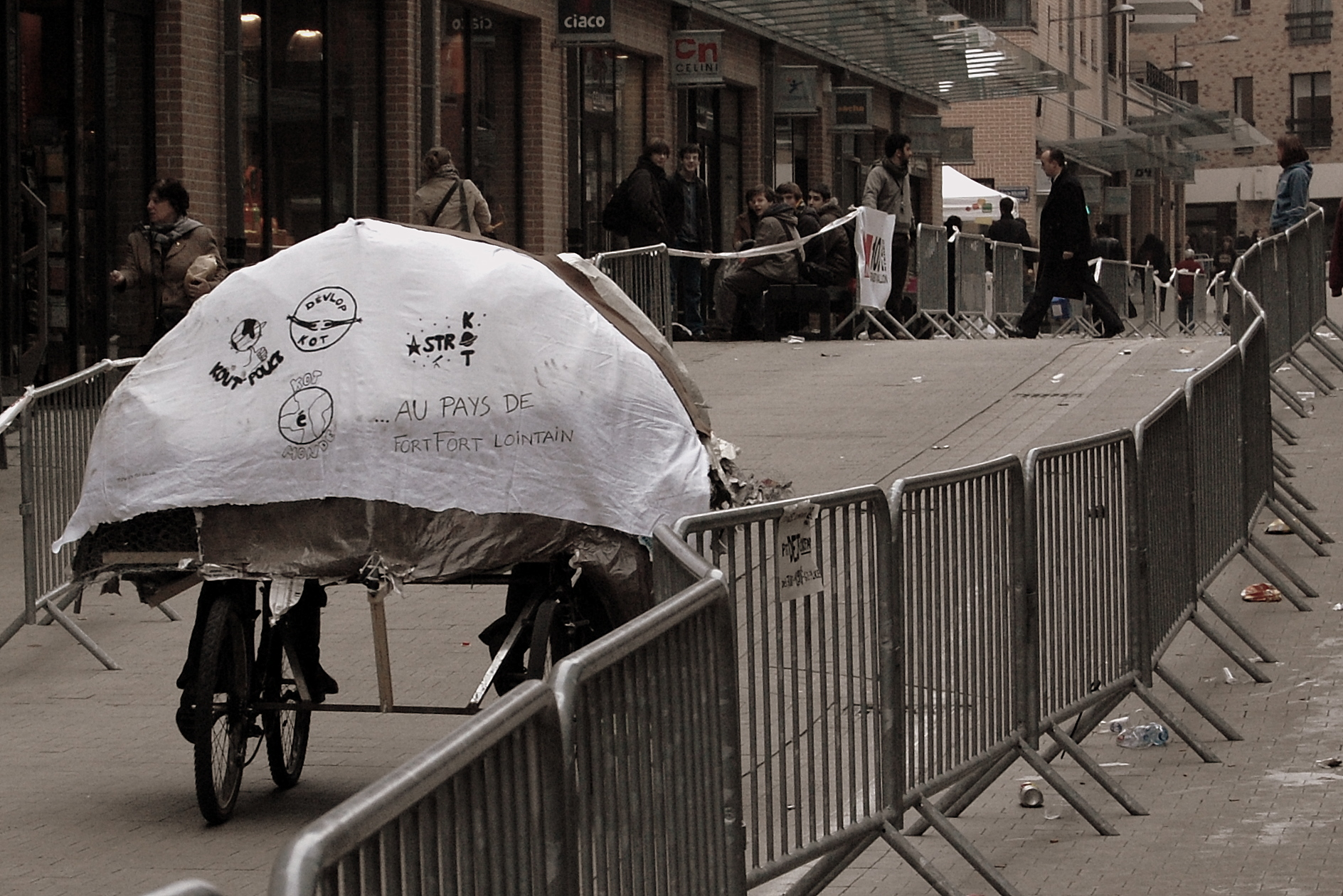
The 24 heures de vélo in 2007

Les 24 heures vélo de Louvain-la-Neuve (English: the 24-hour bike ride of Louvain-la-Neuve) is a Belgian festival organized by students from the University of Louvain (UCLouvain) held every year during October in Louvain-la-Neuve. The main event is a 24-hour bicycle relay race spanning the whole city, surrounded by the crowd during various music concerts and parties.

It is said that the event gathers more than fifty thousand people and that it is the second largest "beer event" in Europe after the Oktoberfest. Approximately, 2000 students are involved in the organisation of Les 24 heures vélo de Louvain-la-Neuve.

In 2006, the 30th edition of the event took place from 25 to 26 October.

The 2008 event passed without major incident, with between 45,000 and 50,000 people attending.

The 2009 edition, taking place from 21 to 22 October, was attended by more than 40,000 people. One particularly serious accident left a young man at risk of paralysis after a fall.

In 2012, the event took place from 24 to 25 October. About 40,000 people attended, but it was relatively trouble-free, with only 23 arrests, less than the previous year.

== See also ==
- Criterium
- University of Louvain (UCLouvain)
- Louvain-la-Neuve
