= LVMH Tower =

Office skyscraper in Manhattan, New York

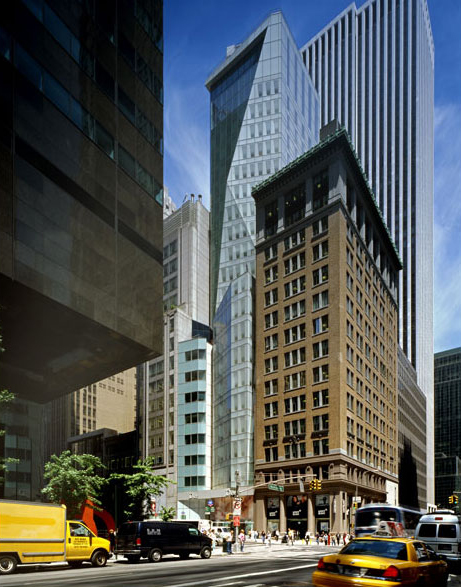

General information
- Architectural style: Postmodern Art Deco
- Location: 19 East 57th Street; New York, NY 10022; U.S.
- Coordinates: 40°45′45.66″N 73°58′21.55″W
- Current tenants: LVMH Moët Hennessy Louis Vuitton SE
- Opened: December 8, 1999

Technical details
- Floor count: 24

Design and construction
- Architect: Christian de Portzamparc
- Structural engineer: Weiskops and Pickworth
- Other designers: Hillier Group (associate architects and interior design)

The LVMH Tower is a 24-story high-rise office tower on 57th Street, near Madison Avenue, in Midtown Manhattan, New York City. Designed by Christian de Portzamparc, the building opened in 1999 as the overseas headquarters of Paris-based LVMH Moët Hennessy Louis Vuitton SE. The building has received widespread praise from architecture critics.

== Architecture ==
=== Facade ===
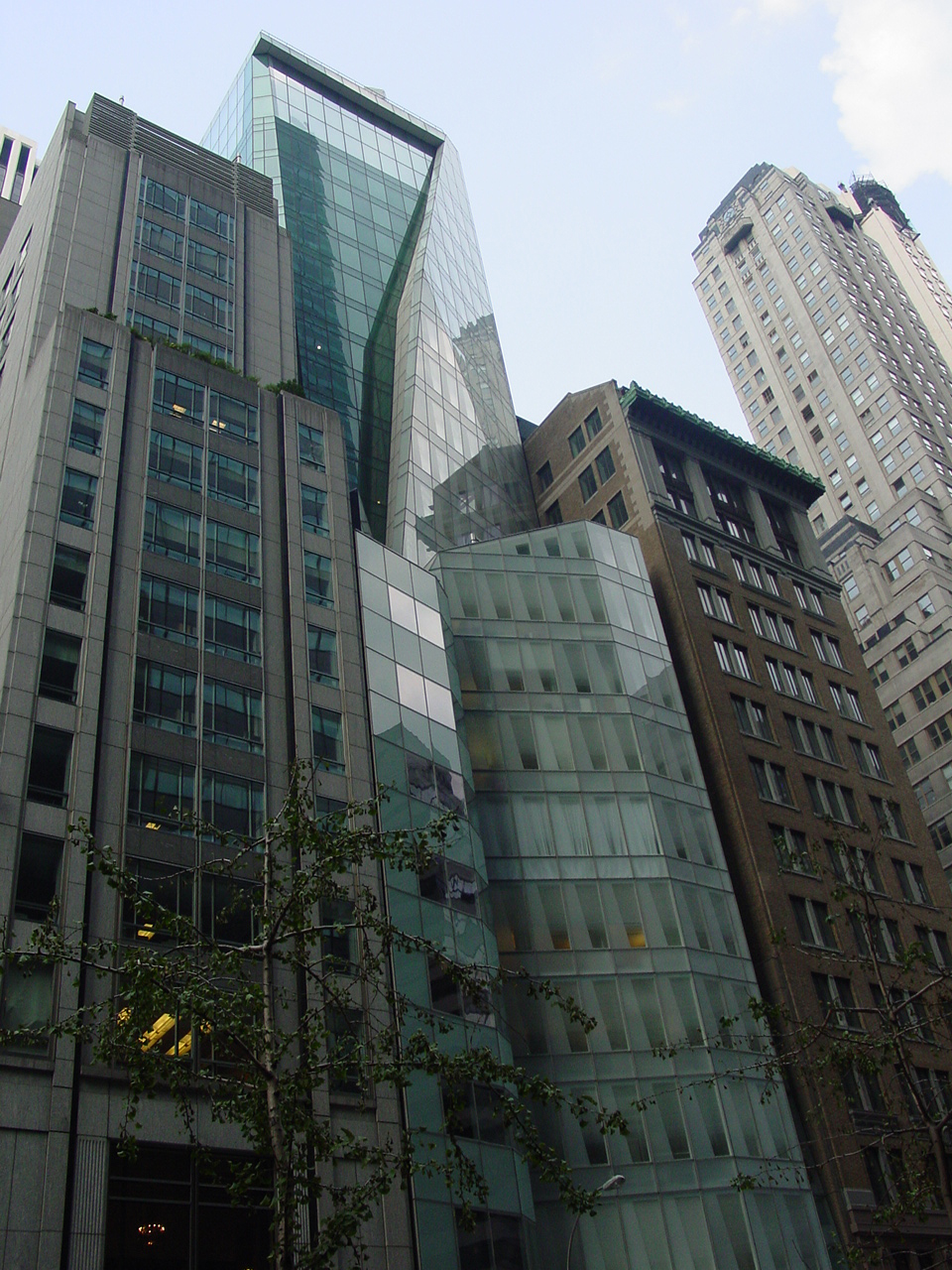
LVMH Tower seen from 57th Street

The building occupies a narrow site between a 1920s bank building and the 1995 American headquarters of Chanel S.A. (designed by Charles Platt after de Portzamparc had completed his design for the LVMH Tower). It is across 57th Street from 590 Madison Avenue, formerly the IBM Building. In contrast to all of these, it is clad in glass. An eleven-story base includes ground-level store space for Christian Dior, designed by Peter Marino, with a metal strip above it that acts as a unifying element. The tower itself has a complex, angular facade divided into two sections along the diagonal, with the right (east) side projecting and bent in the middle, producing a geometry that has been described as feminine, like the fall of a skirt over a bent knee, and also, including by de Portzamparc himself, as resembling the unfolding petals of a flower. A blue glass cube at the center of the fold on the 10th floor resembles a gem. The glass on the left (west) side is green, with fritted dots; on the right side, it is milky white, with each window divided at an angle into a sandblasted half and a clear half with sandblasted lines across it that grow wider on higher floors. The facade also uses ultra-clear low-iron glass. It has set a precedent for other buildings erected by manufacturers of luxury goods.

At night, the white section of the building is lit pale green and violet and the other half recedes; neon tubes under the front fold provide a slash of changing colored light.

The folded facade with its protrusion is an innovative interpretation of the requirement for setbacks in New York City's building code, with a void in the lower section and with the upper section folding back outward in a prismatic rather than a "wedding-cake" shape. Having the building touch the mandated setback line at the minimum two points and folding it inwards from the base to the top made it possible for it to be taller than the neighboring Chanel Building.

=== Interior ===
Each business within the LVMH group has its own floor in the building. The interior design, by the Hillier Group, de Portzamparc's U.S. associate architects on the project, features glass, pressed wood, and metal in the elevator lobby and a glass-enclosed cubic reception space on the top floor, three floors or thirty feet high, made possible by the savings in floor space below, which LVMH calls the Magic Room. This is entered in dramatic fashion down a curving stairway from a mezzanine floor.

== History ==
Ground was broken for the building in 1996, but work was then largely halted for four years by disagreements over financing with the landlord, Robert Siegel, and logistical problems with manufacturing the components in multiple countries. The building opened on December 8, 1999, with a gala that included a model wearing a Galliano gown whose 60-foot train cascaded down the facade.

A planned addition, including an obelisk echoing the IBM Building and a slab of fritted glass at the Madison Avenue corner, was canceled in 2001 because of the economic downturn.

== Critical reception ==
The LVMH Tower has met with praise from architecture critics. Architecture called it "one of the most serious and significant structures in the city in recent years". Ada Louise Huxtable, writing in the Wall Street Journal, called it "the epitome of controlled, refined elegance", "the best new building in New York—not by small degrees but by the equivalent of a jump shot to the moon". Herbert Muschamp, writing in The New York Times, called it "[t]he most important building to be completed in New York in years. . . . [a reinvention of] the spirit of Art Deco", but said that rather than merely imitating Art Deco skyscrapers of the past, the building "deforms the style in order to reinvigorate its fresh, jazzy spirit". Paul Goldberger, writing in The New Yorker, called it "exactly right for the city at this moment", "a stunning, lyrical building"; however, with the exception of the "Magic Room" he was disappointed by the interiors, calling the offices "dull, flat spaces". The Architecture critic also called this "the one great space" and referred to the elevators and offices as "cram, not glam" and "stuffed". Huxtable noted that the small lobby was intended to seem larger by means of lighted white glass panels, but in her opinion the addition of decoration had defeated the effect.

== Sources ==
- Paul Goldberger, "Dior's New House," The New Yorker, January 31, 2000, repr. in Building Up and Tearing Down: Reflections on the Age of Architecture, New York: Random House/Monacelli, 2009, ISBN 978-1-58093-264-6, pp. 111–115.
- Eric Höweler, Skyscraper, New York: Rizzoli/Universe, 2003, ISBN 9780789310057, pp. 166–167
- Ada Louise Huxtable, "French Elegance Hits Midtown Manhattan", The Wall Street Journal, January 10, 2000, repr. in On Architecture: Collected Reflections on a Century of Change, New York: Walker/Bloomsbury, 2008, ISBN 9780802717078, pp. 285–290.
- Sydney LeBlanc, "LVMH Tower, 1999" in The Architecture Traveler: A Guide to 250 Key 20th Century American Buildings, New York: Norton, 2000, ISBN 9780393730500.
