= Studios Hergé =

Former Belgian company

- Company type: Comics studio
- Founded: 1950
- Founder: Hergé
- Defunct: 1986
- Successor: Moulinsart S.A. (now TintinImanigatio S.A.)
- Headquarters: Belgium
- Key people: Former: Jacques Martin; Bob de Moor; Roger Leloup
- Products: The Adventures of Tintin

The Studios Hergé (French pronunciation: [stydjo ɛʁʒe]) were, between 1950 and 1986, a SARL company consisting of Belgian cartoonist Hergé and his collaborators, who assisted him with the creation of The Adventures of Tintin and derived products. Over the years, the studios had between 12 and 50 employees, including some prestigious artists like Jacques Martin, Bob de Moor and Roger Leloup.

Every creation produced by the studios was attributed to Hergé alone, except for three albums of Quick & Flupke which are attributed to Studios Hergé on the cover.

In 1987, the Studios were disbanded and transformed into the Hergé Foundation by Fanny Rodwell, a former colourist at the Studios and Hergé's widow.

== History ==
The Studios Hergé were created by Hergé in 1950 to assist him with the production of The Adventures of Tintin. They permitted him to focus on the creation of new stories by handing over some aspects of the artwork, particularly the colouring, which Hergé had never really mastered and which in the 1940s was done by Edgar Pierre Jacobs, and the drawing of decors. Technical elements required much documentation and a specific drawing technique, making such assistance worthwhile. The Studios were created when Hergé worked on Destination Moon, an adventure permeated by technology.

The influence of some studio members on the stories is also present. For example, Jacques Martin claims to have introduced a number of burlesque gags that don't correspond to Hergés style of humour.

=== The story of the "gag page" ===
An anecdote well known among tintinophiles is indicative of the atmosphere in the Studios in those years. When Hergé was on a holiday in December 1965, the two main collaborators, Bob de Moor and Jacques Martin, created a fake Tintin page, completely in the style of the master, which they sent to the Swiss weekly magazine L'Illustré. It was published there as an installment of the next Tintin adventure.

Jacques Martin: "I first invented a short story, and then composed the page and placed the characters. Next, Bob de Moor completed the backgrounds, which I had sketched, and we both inked the page: he did the backgrounds, I did the characters.

Apparently, Hergé didn't react immediately upon discovering this, but probably preferred let matters stand as they were with this joke, which, according to some, was a true indication of the state of mind of the collaborators who wanted to be more involved in the creation of the adventures of Tintin.

The gag page depicts an airport scene comparable to some sequences in Destination Moon and The Calculus Affair, actually closely resembles a page by Hergé, with only some tintinophiles able to spot some typical style elements of De Moor and Martin. The page can be seen at Tintin est Vivant !.

=== The Studios after Hergé ===
After the death of Hergé in 1983, his widow Fanny Remi, who started working with the studios as a colorist in 1956, inherited the rights to the works of the author, but not the rights to the derived works, which belonged to Hergé's friend Alain Baran of the company Tintin Licensing, who later sold the rights to the television channel Canal+.

Fanny followed the wishes of Hergé. who didn't want The Adventures of Tintin to be continued after his death. Some doubt exists about Tintin and Alph-Art, however, left unfinished by Hergé at his death and at first handed over to the Studios to be finished by De Moor. Fanny Remi then changed her mind and decided to publish just the sketches by Hergé, to the disappointment of De Moor.

There is also some hesitation about Quick & Flupke. Less popular than Tintin, Hergé had not left any clear instructions about a continuation of the series. Perhaps more to keep the Studios running than for a truly artistic reason, Fanny accepted the proposal of Johan De Moor, son of Bob and recent arrival in the Studios, to restart the series. He created an album of new strips while the Studios updated a number of old strips never before published in colour. Three albums appeared in 1985, the only ones to officially credit the Studios Hergé on the cover and inside. Fanny then announced that the series would end there and that the Studios would be closed.

The activities of the Studios ceased soon thereafter, but not before finishing some projects of derived products and publicity work. In 1986, the Studios Hergé were replaced by the Hergé Foundation, solely occupied with the rights of the series.

In 1988, the giant fresco in Stokkel/Stockel metro station was inaugurated, based on sketches by Hergé, which were finished by the Studios.

== Members of the Studios ==
This non-exhaustive list features the principal members only.

=== Artists ===
- Bob de Moor (1950–1986)
  He entered the Studios Hergé on 5 April 1950, and soon became the first assistant, a position held by Edgar P. Jacobs in the previous decade. Reputed for his perfect imitation of the style of Hergé, he supervised the totality of the album production together with Hergé. He was also charged with the creation of all derived products featuring the heads of Tintin or Snowy.
- Jacques Martin (1947?–1972)
  Creator of Alix, close to Hergé, he joined the Studios mainly as an assistant to the stories, starting with The Calculus Affair. He worked with Hergé until 1972, notably on The Red Sea Sharks and Tintin in Tibet
- Roger Leloup (1953–1969)
  Assistant of Jacques Martin for the colours and backgrounds in Alix, he joined the Studios Hergé on 15 February 1953. His main work are the mechanical elements in the drawings, like automobiles. He was the creator of the futuristic jet of Laszlo Carreidas in Flight 714 to Sydney. He was also responsible for the public relations of Hergé. He left the Studios on 31 December 1969 to work exclusively on his own series, Yoko Tsuno.
- Michel Demarets (1953–1986)
- Jo-El Azara (1954–1961)
- Guy Dessicy (1950–1953), creator of the Publiart company
- Johan De Moor
  The son of Bob De Moor arrived at the Studios only a short time before the death of Hergé, and was mainly active afterwards, with the new version of Quick & Flupke.
- Pierre Gay (1984–1986)
  A young cartoonist hired 13 months after Hergé's death as an assistant to Bob De Moor. He was the last cartoonist to be hired by the Studios Hergé.

=== Colorists ===
- Josette Baujot
  Main colorist. Her rather stormy character was caricatured in Tintin and Alph-Art with the character Josette Laijot.
- Monique Laurent
- France Ferrari
- Nicole Thenen
- Fanny Vlamynck
  Became the second wife of Hergé and inherited the rights to his works after his death. Presides over the Hergé Foundation since 1986. Remarried later to Nick Rodwell.

=== Secretaries ===
- Marcel Dehaye
- Baudouin van den Branden

== Works of the Studios ==
All works realised under the name of Hergé since 1950 can be considered as works of the Studios. This is a non-exhaustive list of those works where the Studios played a major role, either by colouring, drawing of backgrounds, or by completely replacing Hergé. However, it is difficult to correctly judge the role of the contributors, as Hergé and, later, his rights-holders minimized their work. There is debate over a number of albums, mainly Tintin and the Picaros and the third version of The Black Island, where some believe that Bob De Moor completely redrew the entire album. With the Jo, Zette and Jocko adventure The Valley of the Cobras, Jacques Martin is sometimes said to have drawn the whole of the album.

=== Albums ===
==== The Adventures of Tintin ====
1. Destination Moon (1953)
2. Explorers on the Moon (1954)
3. The Calculus Affair (1956)
4. The Red Sea Sharks (1958)
5. Tintin in Tibet (1960)
6. The Castafiore Emerald (1963)
7. Flight 714 to Sydney (1968)
8. Tintin and the Picaros (1976)

===== Reformatting and colouring of old albums =====
- Cigars of the Pharaoh (1955)
- The Black Island (1966)
  This is the third version of this album, requested by the British publisher of Tintin who wanted a more realistic representation of the country. Bob De Moor visited the country extensively and redrew most of the book.
- Land of Black Gold (1971)
  Some scenes rewritten by Hergé and redrawn by Bob De Moor.

===== Additional publications =====
- Six pop-up books, Pop-Hop, published by Hallmark between 1969 and 1971.
  Realised by Michel Demarets, based on existing stories.
- Tintin and the Lake of Sharks (1972), adaptation of the animated movie.
  Two versions were created, one with stills from the movie, the other one as a redrawn comic strip. The former was published as a book by Casterman while the latter was published in a number of Belgian and French newspapers.
- Two books Jouons avec Tintin are combined and published in English as The Tintin Games Book (1974).
  Also realised by Michel Demarets based on the albums by Hergé.

===== Short stories =====
- Les Gorilles de la Vedette (Tintin) (1985)
  Two pages drawn by Bob de Moor, published in Super Tintin n°28, with the Thompson Twins as stars.
- The 60th and last page of Récit Spatio-Temporel by the artists of the weekly Tintin magazine, as usual by Bob de Moor, in the Tintin magazine n°23 of 1986
- Les Magiciens d'Eau (1987)
  One page drawn by Bob de Moor for the Fondation Balavoine, published in the book with the same title
- Les Aventures de la 2 CV et de l'Homme des Neiges (engl.: The adventures of the Citroën 2CV6 and The Arctic Snowman, 1987)
  Eight pages, publicity for Citroën.
- Les Aventures de la 2 CV et de la Grotte Hantée (1988)
  Eight pages, publicity for Citroën.

==== Quick & Flupke ====
===== Adaptation of old gags by Hergé =====
- Jeux interdits (1985)
- Tout va bien (1985)

===== New gags created after the death of Hergé =====
- Haute tension (1985)
  Johan De Moor with ideas by Roger Ferrari

==== Jo, Zette and Jocko ====
- La Vallée des Cobras (1956)

==== Pages by Bob de Moor featuring Hergé ====
- Un bienfait ne reste jamais impuni, 1 page, (À Suivre...), Hors Série Spécial Hergé, April 1983
- De la Planche aux planches, 1 page, Tintin magazine n°43, 1986 (Barelli meets Hergé)

=== Animated movies ===
- Tintin and the Temple of the Sun (1969) by Eddie Lateste. Animated movie by Belvision Studios.
- Tintin and the Lake of Sharks (1972) by Raymond Leblanc. Animated movie by Belvision, story by Greg.
- Quick & Flupke (1985). Series of short animations by Johan De Moor.
