= RIVP =

French public housing agency

RIVP – Régie Immobilière de la Ville de Paris
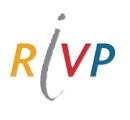
- Industry: Social housing
- Founded: 1923
- Headquarters: Paris, France
- Key people: Serge Contat
- Number of employees: 1160 (FY 2013)
- Website: http://www.rivp.fr

The Régie Immobilière de la Ville de Paris (also known as the RIVP) is a public housing agency created in 1923 for the construction of low cost and affordable housing in Paris, France. Its purpose is to manage, build and rehabilitate social housing, student residences and more recently business incubators. It is a semi-public company whose main shareholder is the City of Paris.

The goals of the RIVP are as follows:

- To ensure the construction, the maintenance and management of rental real estate programs, mainly in the domaine of social housing for the City of Paris.
- To ensure the achievement of public facilities in terms of project management.
- To execute maintenance work and to improve the patrimony.
- Support the development of young companies through incubators.

The City of Paris became the majority shareholder of RIVP in 2007. The RIVP has been chaired by Pierre Castagnou from 2006 to 2009. Pierre Aidenbaum succeeded him until 2014. The RIVP is currently chaired by Frédérique Calandra who was elected on May 30, 2014.

== See also ==
- Public housing in France
