= Le Moniteur des travaux publics et du bâtiment =

French magazine for architecture

Logo of the magazine

Le Moniteur des travaux publics et du bâtiment (Monitor of public works and buildings, ISSN 0026-9700) is a French weekly magazine covering construction systems and architecture. Founded in 1903 by Louis Dubois, it belongs to Groupe Moniteur along with other specialized publications such as L'Usine nouvelle, Les Cahiers techniques du bâtiment, Négoce, Le Moniteur des Artisans, Le Moniteur Matériels, and La Gazette des Communes.

Its mother company Infopro Digital is owned by TowerBrook Capital Partners. The magazine's headquarters are in Paris.
