= Pierre Laconte =

Belgian urbanist (born 1934)

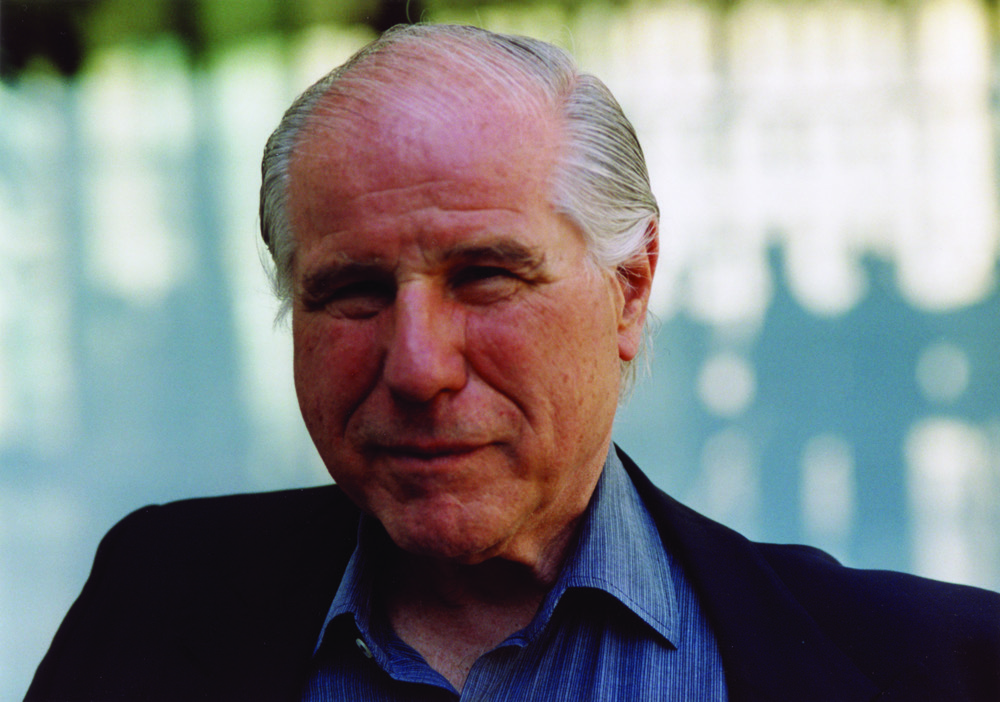
Pierre Laconte

Pierre Laconte (born 17 May 1934, Brussels), is a Belgian urbanist. He specialises in urban transport and architectural planning and environmental issues.

He has a Doctorate in Law and a Doctorate in Economics from the Catholic University of Louvain and is Dr. honoris causa of the Napier University, Edinburgh.

Laconte is one of the three planners in charge of the Groupe Urbanisme & Architecture. This Group was responsible for the master plan and the architectural co-ordination of Louvain-la-Neuve, a pedestrian new university town developed from 1968 on by the University on agricultural land, around a new railway station, 25 km South of Brussels. Louvain-la-Neuve has a day/night population of ca 40.000. It won the UIA Abercrombie Award.

He received the UN Habitat Scroll of Honour Award in 1999, and was the Belgian Government Representative at UN Habitat I in 1976, at Habitat II in 1996, and at the UN Kyoto Conference of Parties on Climate (1997).

Laconte was the president of ISOCARP – International Society of City and Regional Planners between 2006–2009, and the Foundation for the Urban Environment.

He is Council member of Europa Nostra and chairman of Europa Nostra's Industrial and Engineering Heritage Committee.

He has been

- a member (2004–2011) and Vice-Chairman (2008–2011) of the Scientific Committee of the European Environmental Agency,
- member of the Lee Kwan Yew World City Prize Council for 2010 and for 2012,
- member of the Advisory Group of Singapore World Cities Summit 2012,
- member of the Evaluation team for the European Green Capital Award 2012 and 2013.

He is regularly organizing lunch-debates at the Fondation Universitaire, devoted to urban themes.

== International activities ==
- European Environment Agency – EEA (Copenhagen): Vice-President, Scientific Committee in charge of urban issues, since 2003. The EEA, headed by Prof. J. McGlade, is the European Union body gathering environmental information and analysis for the Union.
- Europa Nostra, (The Hague): Member of the Council since 2003. Europa Nostra, chaired by the Infanta Dona Pilar de Borbon, is the European Federation of heritage associations.
- International Association of Public Transport – UITP (Brussels): Honorary Secretary General since 1999 (was SG 1984–1999). UITP is the worldwide network of public transport professionals, the point of reference for the sector and its international policy Forum.
- Academy of Arts, Berlin: Member, Sektion Baukunst, since 1995.
- Journals "Transport Policy" and "Progress in Planning", Elsevier: Member of the Editorial Board.
- Fundacion Metropoli, Madrid: M. Consejo internacional de asesores.
- Club of Rome (Brussels EU Chapter): Board M. The Club of Rome is a global think tank and centre of innovation and initiative.
- Urban Land Institute – Member, ULI: European Policy and Practice Committee, London, since 2005. ULI is a non-profit education and research institute with focus on the use of land in order to enhance the total environment.
- International Council on Ecopolis Development, Board Member since 2007.

== Selected publications ==
- Mutations urbaines et Marchés immobiliers, Brussels: Oyez 1978 – won the Credit Communal/Gemeentekrediet Award 1974-1978 for Law and Economics (being updated)
- Human and Energy Factors in Planning: A Systems Approach, The Hague; Martinus Nijhoff, 1982.
- Water Resources and Land-Use Planning: A Systems Approach, The Hague, Martinus Nijhoff, 1982.
- La gare et la ville (Train, Station and City), Liège: Editions du Perron, 2003
- L’aéroport le train et la ville (Airport, Train and City), in French & Dutch, Liège: Ed. du Perron, 2005
- Brussels; Perspectives for a European Capital, Brussels: Editions Aliter, 2007 - won the Gerald L. Young Book Award of the Society of Human Ecology, Washington, 2008
- L’Europe, la Belgique et Bruxelles : Un urbanisme cosmopolite, Lyon, Editions du Certu (Ministère de l’Equipement), 2007
- In 2016 is to be published Sustainable Urban Environments in Europe - Evaluation Criteria and Practices.
