= Hergé Foundation =

Organization that managed the works of cartoonist Hergé, including Tintin

TintinImaginatio S.A.
- Founded: 1987
- Founder: Fanny Rodwell
- Location: Brussels, Belgium
- Key people: Fanny Rodwell (CEO & Chairperson)
- Website: www.tintin.com/en/fondation-herge
- Formerly called: Hergé Foundation; Studios Hergé; Moulinsart

The Hergé Foundation is the official organisation that looks after the world and works of Hergé and his creation The Adventures of Tintin, along with his other comics like Quick & Flupke and Jo, Zette and Jocko. Created from Studios Hergé in 1987 by Fanny Rodwell, Hergé's widow, the Hergé Foundation is a not-for-profit organisation based in Brussels, the birthplace of the creator of Tintin. It runs Hergé's estate, the official Tintin website, and the Hergé museum.

== Editions Moulinsart ==
The foundation has released many books on the subject of Tintin in French under the publishing name "Editions Moulinsart".

== Awards ==
On 1 June 2006, the Dalai Lama bestowed the International Campaign for Tibet's Light of Truth Award upon the Hergé Foundation, along with South African Archbishop Desmond Tutu. The award was the Dalai Lama's recognition of Tintin in Tibet, Hergé's most personal adventure. Accepting on behalf of the Hergé Foundation, Hergé's widow Fanny Rodwell stated, "We never thought that this story of friendship would have a resonance more than 40 years later."

== Rights issue ==
The Hergé Foundation has frequently litigated against other entities that attempted to use Tintin images. However, after Moulinsart sued Dutch fanzine Hergé Genootschap (Hergé Society) in 2012 for €1 million for publishing Tintin images without a license, a contract was unearthed whereby Hergé had assigned all the rights of his works to his original publisher Casterman in 1942. At no time has Fanny Rodwell, the widow and sole heir to the foundation, nor her husband Nick Rodwell, who manages the Tintin empire, ever challenged the agreement in the past. The court's decision means Moulinsart never owned the rights they have been asserting. "It appears, from a 1942 document ... that Hergé gave publishing rights for the books of The Adventures of Tintin to publisher Casterman, so Moulinsart is not the one to decide who can use material from the books." said the Hague court's ruling. The document came from a Hergé expert who wishes to remain anonymous.

== TintinImaginatio ==
The name "Moulinsart" was chosen as the name for the foundation's commercial and copyright wing, set up to actively work to protect and promote the work of Hergé. It is named after Moulinsart, the château where Captain Haddock lives in the books (in the English translations, "Moulinsart" is known as "Marlinspike Hall").

On 20 September 2022, Moulinsart announced that its name was changed to TintinImaginatio. The organization stated the reason of the change is because it wants to bring the word Tintin back into name of the operational management and marketing activities, as well that the name is more recognizable internationally. Furthermore, the new name also reflects the new perspectives of opening up to the virtual world, the imaginary world, and the imagination.
