= The Castafiore Emerald =

Comic album by Belgian cartoonist Hergé

The Castafiore Emerald (Les Bijoux de la Castafiore)
- Cover of the English edition
- Date: 1963
- Series: The Adventures of Tintin
- Publisher: Casterman

Creative team
- Creator: Hergé

Original publication
- Published in: Tintin magazine
- Issues: 665–726
- Date of publication: 4 July 1961 – 4 September 1962
- Language: French

Translation
- Publisher: Methuen
- Date: 1963
- Translator: Leslie Lonsdale-Cooper; Michael Turner

Chronology
- Preceded by: Tintin in Tibet (1960)
- Followed by: Flight 714 to Sydney (1968)

The Castafiore Emerald (French: Les Bijoux de la Castafiore) is the twenty-first volume of The Adventures of Tintin, the comics series by Belgian cartoonist Hergé. It was serialised weekly from July 1961 to September 1962 in Tintin magazine. In contrast to the previous Tintin books, Hergé deliberately broke the adventure formula he had created: it is the only book in the series where the characters remain at Marlinspike Hall, Captain Haddock's family estate, and neither travel abroad nor confront dangerous criminals. The plot concerns the visit of the opera singer Bianca Castafiore and the subsequent theft of her emerald.

Although The Castafiore Emerald received critical acclaim for its humorous depiction of its characters following a trail of red herrings, it failed to match the commercial success of previous volumes due to the experimental nature of its narrative. It was published as a book by Casterman shortly after its conclusion. Hergé continued The Adventures of Tintin with Flight 714 to Sydney, while the series itself became a defining part of the Franco-Belgian comics tradition. The story was adapted for both the 1991 Ellipse/Nelvana animated series The Adventures of Tintin and the 1992–93 BBC Radio 5 dramatisation of the Adventures.

== Synopsis ==
Tintin and Captain Haddock are walking through the countryside of Marlinspike when they come across a Romani community camped in a garbage dump, and reunite a lost little girl named Miarka with her family there. The Romani explain that they are not allowed to camp anywhere else so Haddock invites them to the grounds of his estate, Marlinspike Hall.

Haddock has been trying to get the local stonemason Arthur Bolt to fix a broken step at Marlinspike, but he is never available. Milanese opera diva Bianca Castafiore invites herself to Marlinspike Hall. Haddock, who dislikes her company, tries to leave before she arrives but trips on the broken step and sprains his ankle. The doctor puts his foot in a cast and imposes bed rest. Castafiore then arrives with her maid, Irma, and pianist, Igor Wagner. Castafiore presents Haddock with a pet parrot and fusses over him, to his great discomfort.

The magazine Paris Flash claim that Haddock and Castafiore are engaged, on the basis of a misinterpreted interview with Professor Calculus. This results in an avalanche of congratulations from Haddock's friends. A television crew come to Marlinspike Hall to interview Castafiore and a mysterious photographer, Gino, appears with the crew. Suddenly, Irma informs Castafiore that her jewels have been stolen, and Tintin suspects Gino who runs away during a temporary power cut. Castafiore, however, finds the jewel-case which she herself had misplaced. The next day, an angry Castafiore shows Tintin and Haddock a copy of the magazine Tempo di Roma with a picture of Castafiore taken at Marlinspike Hall without her permission, proving that Gino was only a paparazzo.

A few days later, Castafiore's most valuable jewel, an emerald given to her by the fictional Maharajah of Gopal, goes missing. After initially questioning Irma, Nestor and Calculus, the detectives Thomson and Thompson suspect the Romani. Their suspicions are heightened when they find a pair of golden scissors belonging to Irma in Miarka's possession, though she claims to have found them. After the Romani depart, the police start looking for them. Tintin also investigates Igor Wagner, whose behaviour he finds suspicious, but finds out that the musician is simply sneaking out to indulge in a horse-gambling habit.

Castafiore leaves for Milan to perform in the opera La gazza ladra (Italian: The Thieving Magpie). Tintin realises that the true culprit responsible for the theft of the emerald and the scissors is a magpie. He explains to Haddock that the scissors must have fallen out of the nest only to be found by Miarka. Tintin retrieves the emerald and hands it to Thomson and Thompson, who return it to Castafiore. Sometime later after Calculus, Thomson and Thompson had departed, Bolt mends the broken step, only for Haddock to inadvertently step on it and slip again while the cement is still wet.

== History ==
=== Background ===
"When I began this book, my aim was to tell a story where nothing happened. Without resorting to anything exotic (except the gipsies [sic]). I wanted simply to see if I could keep the reader in suspense until the end".

— Hergé in an interview with Numa Sadoul.

Following the culmination of the previous story, Tintin in Tibet (1960), Hergé began planning his next adventure, seeking advice from the cartoonist Greg. Greg produced two plot outlines, Les Pilulues ("The Pills") and Tintin et le Thermozéro ("Tintin and the Thermozero"). Hergé began drawing the latter of these stories, but soon abandoned it. Instead, he decided to set his new Adventure entirely at Marlinspike Hall, the only installment in the series to do this. This was the first and last adventure after The Secret of the Unicorn (1943) to be set entirely in Belgium, and he admitted that with his proposed scenario, it was difficult "to create suspense, a semblance of danger". The titles that Hergé had previously considered for the book were: The Castafiore Affair, Castafiore's Sapphire, The Castafiore Jewels and The Captain and the Nightingale, but The Castafiore Emerald eventually emerged as the favourite.

Hergé's depiction of Bianca Castafiore in the story – a famous opera singer, pursued by the press, and changing her outfit for every occasion – was influenced by the life of the opera singer Maria Callas. One of the new characters that Hergé introduced into the story was the stonemason Arthur Bolt (M. Boullu in the original French version), whose characterisation was based on a real individual who worked for Hergé. Hergé's depiction of the paparazzi within the story may have been influenced by his own repeat encounters with the press throughout his career. The reporter and the photographer, Christopher Willoughby-Droupe and Marco Rizotto (Jean-Loup de la Battelerie and Walter Rizotto respectively in the original French version) of the Paris Flash, are introduced into the series here, and would later be retroactively added into a re-drawing of The Black Island (1938) by Bob de Moor, also making a reappearance in Tintin and the Picaros (1976). (Note: The duo are unnamed in The Black Island, with their names revealed by Castafiore in The Castafiore Emerald.) The idea of having a proposed marriage between Castafiore and Haddock was based on a reader's suggestion that Haddock marry.

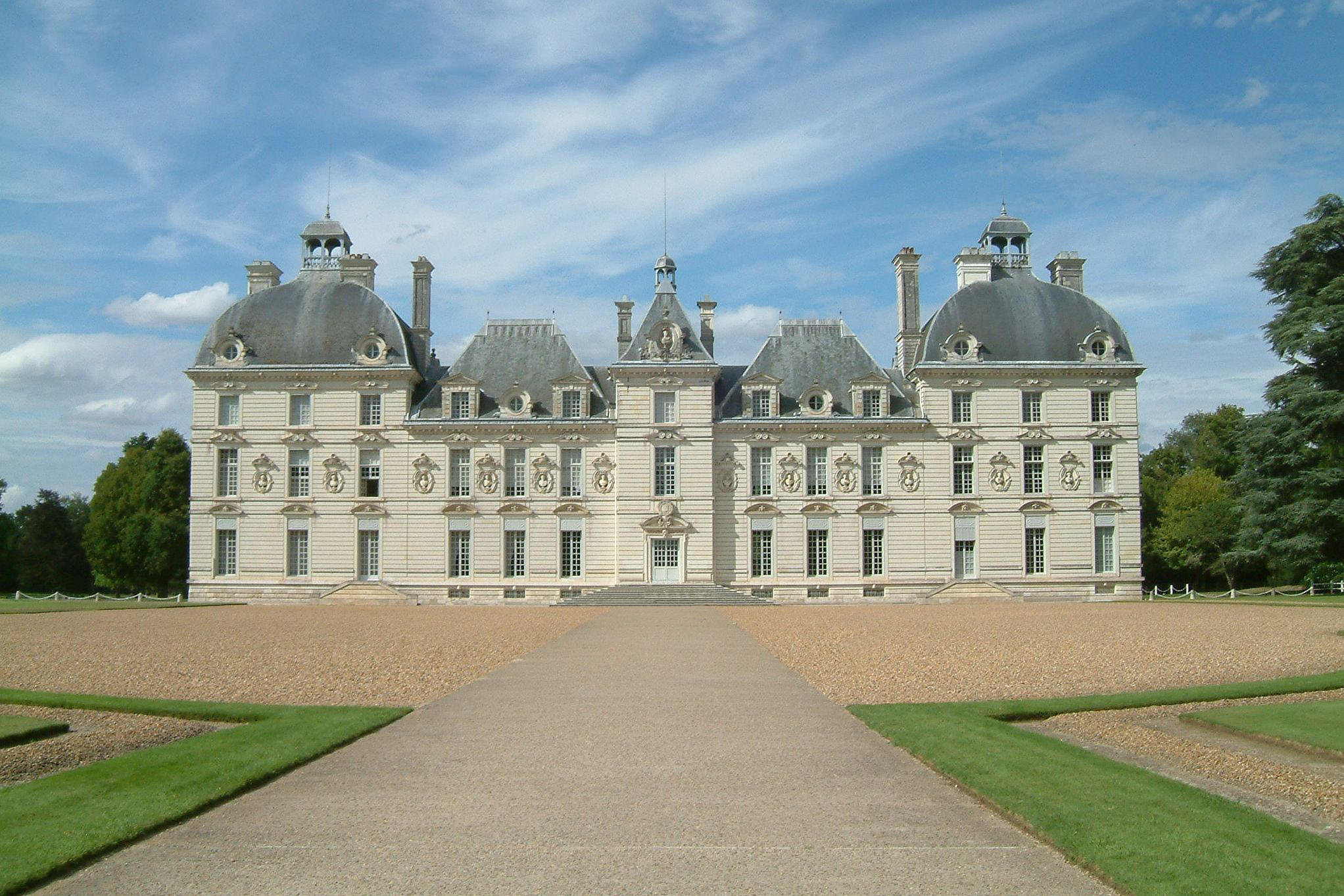
The Château de Cheverny in France was used as the basis for Haddock's family estate, Marlinspike Hall or Moulinsart in the original French version.

On page 17 of the book, Jolyon Wagg mentions Castafiore's Emerald to be a gift from, in his own words, "some character, Marjorie something or other...", to which Castafiore corrects Wagg by saying it was from the Maharajah of Gopal. The Maharajah of Gopal does not make an appearance in The Adventures of Tintin, but is one of the main characters in The Valley of the Cobras (1956), which is a part of another Franco-Belgian comics series created by Hergé, The Adventures of Jo, Zette and Jocko (1935–1958). Hergé also introduced the Romani people, members of whose community had previously appeared in Destination New York (1951), another book from The Adventures of Jo, Zette and Jocko. The idea of including them in the story was inspired by an occasion on which Hergé came across a Romani gypsy camp near to his country home in Céroux-Mousty. To ensure that his depiction of them had some accuracy, he approached Father Rupert in Verviers, who had some experience with the community, reassuring him that "the episode with the Romas will not pain you".

The Castafiore Emerald was also one of the few instances of romance seen in The Adventures of Tintin, which begins when Calculus breeds a new variety of white-coloured roses, and names it "Bianca" in honour of Castafiore. At her departure, Calculus presents a bouquet of the roses he created to Castafiore, who happily receives them and embraces Calculus, kissing him in the process. Unlike Haddock, who resents being kissed by Castafiore, Calculus willingly accepts it and blushes. Calculus also makes an imperfect attempt at colour television, which according to Michael Farr, was "some five years ahead of its day".

=== Influences ===
Castafiore's mention of Calculus' "ascents in balloons" is a reference to Auguste Piccard, based on whom Calculus was modelled.

The incident of the unwelcome band playing outside Marlinspike Hall, called the "Marlinspike Prize Band" (Harmonie de Moulinsart in the original French version), was based on a similar experience of Hergé's who was also obliged to serve a band with drinks. (Note: Michael Farr does not mention the band's name.) To add insult to injury, they gave a toast to "Spirou", the cartoon character created by Robert Velter. Another influence for the band was a cutting of "L'Orpheon France" band. Whenever Castafiore fears her jewels were stolen, her expressions, which involve placing her hands on her face, were influenced by a photograph of her model in real life, Maria Callas, taken by Cecil Beaton in 1957. In page 43 of the book, Tintin is shown reading Robert Louis Stevenson's novel Treasure Island (1883), which was also one of Hergé's favourite books. The depiction of the Romani wagons and clothing was closely modelled on photographs of Romani communities that Hergé had consulted, and he depicted members of the group engaged in basket weaving and fortune telling after reading that the Romani engaged in such activities in the Oxford English Dictionary.

The book alludes to the well-known French weekly Paris Match in its depiction of the reporters from the magazine Paris Flash and jibes at its reputation for the questionable accuracy of the articles. Hergé's use of the word Paris Flash is also based on a previous encounter of his with the Paris Match when it featured an "error-ridden" article on him. It also mentions a fashion designing company named Tristan Bior, based upon the French luxury goods company, Christian Dior. Andy (André in the original French version), the director of the television crew belonging to the fictional company, Supavision, was compared by Farr to an employee of Belgian Television, Jacques Cogniaux. In a tribute to Auguste Piccard, Calculus' model in real life, Castafiore greets him as a famous balloonist. Hergé also inserted references to previous stories in the narrative; he included the three models of the Unicorn, originally featured in The Secret of the Unicorn, in a background scene at Marlinspike Hall.

=== Publication ===
The Castafiore Emerald was serialised weekly from 4 July 1961 to 4 September 1962 in Tintin magazine and published in book form as Les Bijoux de la Castafiore by Casterman in 1963. For the English version of the book, the gramophone record that Tintin receives from Castafiore, which is the "Jewel Song" from Charles Gounod's Faust, is titled "Margarethe", the name by which Gounod's opera is known in Germany but not in England.

The Castafiore Emerald was the first book in The Adventures of Tintin that was published in England the same year – 1963 – it was published in Belgium and France. When Hergé read the English version of the book, (Note: Stated by Pierre Assouline as the "British edition".) he found it to be "absolutely delirious" and even suggested to translators Leslie Lonsdale-Cooper and Michael Turner: "You really would think that this was originally written in English". In the original French version, Calculus ignores Haddock's attempt to refer to the latest developments of colour television in the United States when presenting his prototype; this does not occur in the English edition.

== Critical analysis ==
The book was considered by critics to be an antithesis of the previous Tintin ventures. Michael Farr, author of Tintin: The Complete Companion, stated that in The Castafiore Emerald, Hergé permits Haddock to remain at home in Marlinspike, an ideal that the "increasingly travel weary" character had long cherished, further stating that if Hergé had decided to end the Tintin series, The Castafiore Emerald would have been "a suitable final volume". He compared the story to the detective novels by Agatha Christie, in that the narrative was "littered from start to finish with clues, most of which are false", misleading both Tintin and the reader. He felt that in setting the story entirely at Marlinspike, Hergé "deliberately broke the classic adventure mould he had created", and in doing so "succeeded in creating a masterpiece in the manner of a well constructed stage comedy or farce". Farr viewed the volume as "a tour de force", noting that it was quite dissimilar to any other instalment in The Adventures of Tintin. As such, he felt that it would have been a suitable story on which to end the series. As a result of its "experimental, exceptional nature", Farr believed that The Castafiore Emerald "never gained the public recognition it merits", stating that while attracting "a loyal following" it had not become one of the most popular Adventures of Tintin, something that he thought was "unjust".

Jean-Marc Lofficier and Randy Lofficier, co-authors of the book, The Pocket Essential Tintin, described Hergé's depiction of Castafiore in the story as "a force of nature", praising the way that he depicted her many outfit changes. They described Mr Bolt as being both a "Godot-like character" and as being akin to Basil Fawlty from the British sitcom Fawlty Towers, while adding that the broken step acts "like a Greek God's curse" in the story that affects everyone except Castafiore. They interpreted The Castafiore Emerald as Hergé's Nouveau Roman, in which he realises that he cannot improve upon the standard set in Tintin in Tibet and thus decides to "deconstruct his own myth and create the antithesis of a Tintin adventure". Given that accidents and bad luck befall most of the characters in the story, Lofficier and Lofficier described the story as "a comedy of errors, a wonderful tribute to Murphy's Law". Ultimately, they awarded the story four stars out of five.

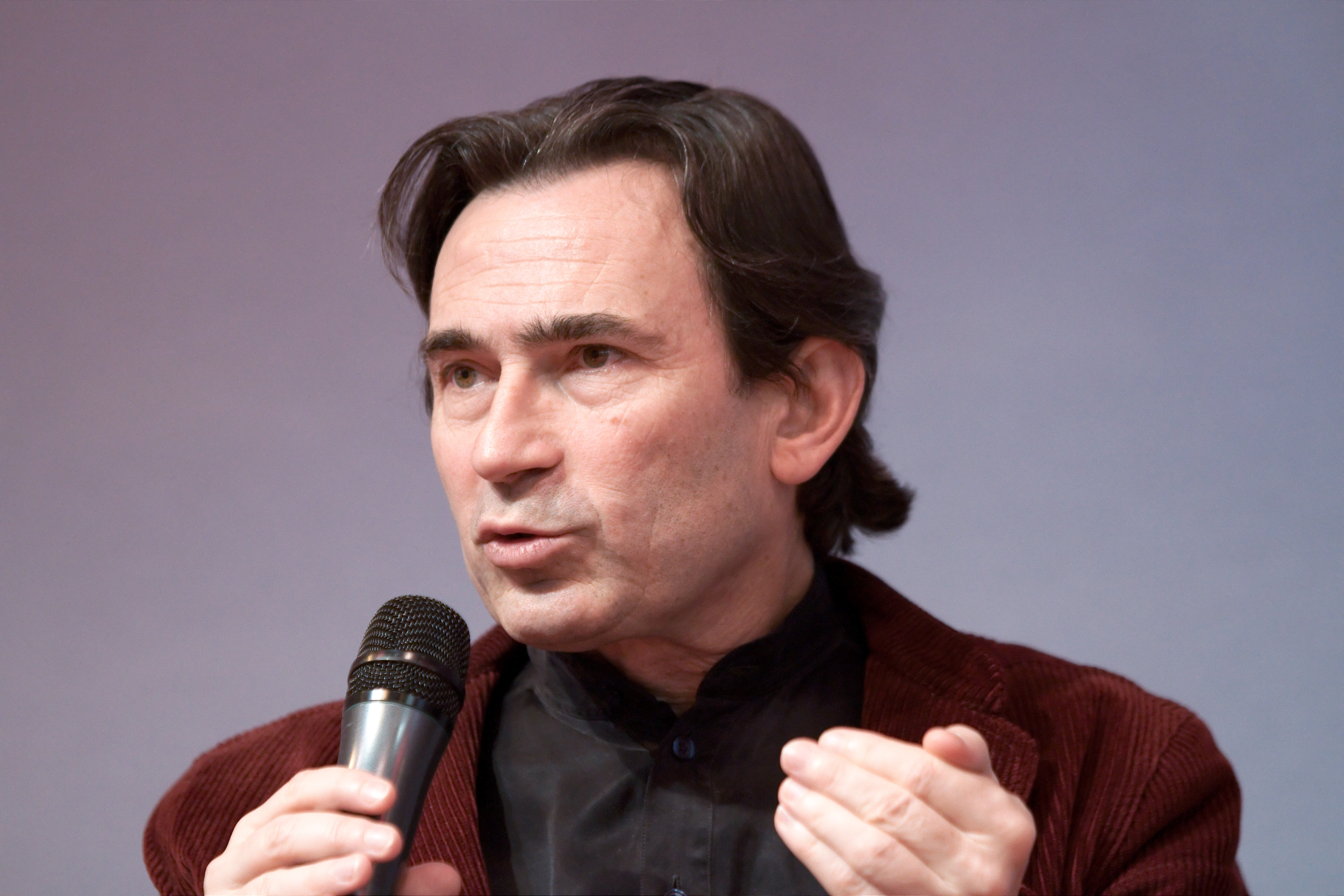
Hergé biographer Benoît Peeters (pictured, 2010) described The Castafiore Emerald as "the most surprising of Tintin's adventures".

English screenwriter and author of Tintin: Hergé and his Creation (1991), Harry Thompson stated that in The Castafiore Emerald, "everything is topsy-turvy", with obvious villains being shown to be harmless, and alleged crimes turning out to have not happened. He thought that Haddock was a clear parallel for Hergé himself in the story, representing his own desires and frustrations. Ultimately, he considered the volume to be "Hergé's masterpiece" when it came to technical issues, representing "the high tide of his creative abilities".

Hergé biographer Benoît Peeters described the story as "the most surprising of Tintin's adventures", with Hergé having been "determined to push his reexamination of the comic strip even further". He noted that in the story, Castafiore's "dramatic femininity" disrupted the "idea of sociability" that pervaded Marlinspike, with its "proper respect of space, a form of harmony in independence". He added that "this casually alluring tale is one of the most subtly handled of the adventures; a riot of clues, both real and false, give The Castafiore Emerald an unequaled density", elsewhere referring to it as "a catalogue of mishaps with nothing or no one spared". He described it as having brought to the foreground the "anarchist and non-conformist tendencies of Hergé's work" which had previously been shown in Quick & Flupke. He also saw the book as being "a sort of flashback" for Hergé, allowing him to relive events from his own past; thus, Peeters thought that the constant renovations at Marlinspike represented the constant renovations at Hergé's country home of Céroux-Mousty, while Haddock's time in the wheelchair represented his former wife's Germaine time spent similarly disabled, and Castafiore was a parody of Germaine herself. Ultimately, he felt that the story – "the last great adventure of Tintin" – was "also a swan song", for Hergé "did not dare to continue down this path, where not all of his readers had followed him", and which had represented "a permanent loss of innocence".

== Adaptations ==
In June 1970, a long article on The Castafiore Emerald by French philosopher and author, Michel Serres, appeared in the literary review, Critique, under the title, Les Bijoux distraits ou la cantatrice sauve.

In 1991, a collaboration between the French studio Ellipse and the Canadian animation company Nelvana adapted 21 of the stories into a series of episodes, each 42 minutes long. The Castafiore Emerald was the nineteenth story of The Adventures of Tintin to be adapted. Directed by Stéphane Bernasconi, the series has been praised for being "generally faithful", with compositions having been actually directly taken from the panels in the original comic book.

In 2015, the story was adapted into a ballad opera, which premiered at Solvay Castle (Château de La Hulpe), in La Hulpe, Belgium. The cast included Michel de Warzee as Captain Haddock, Hélène Bernardy as Castafiore, and Amani Picci as Tintin.
