= The Adventures of Jo, Zette and Jocko =

Comics series by Belgian cartoonist Hergé

Jo, Zette and Jocko
- Left to right: Zette, Jocko, and Jo

Publication information
- Genre: Action/adventure
- Publication date: January 19, 1936 – 1957
- Main character(s): Jo, Zette, Jocko, Mr Legrand, Mrs Legrand

Creative team
- Created by: Hergé

The Adventures of Jo, Zette and Jocko is a Franco-Belgian comics series created by Hergé, the writer-artist best known for The Adventures of Tintin. The heroes of the series are two young children, brother and sister Jo and Zette Legrand, and their pet chimpanzee Jocko, along with Jo and Zette's parents, aerospace engineer and designer Mr. Legrand and housewife Mrs. Legrand.

Originally serialized between 1936 and 1940, the full comics albums were published from 1951 to 1957.

== Synopsis ==
The following are the five Jo, Zette and Jocko stories, with both their English and French titles.

No.	English title	French title	Notes	Published
1	The 'Manitoba' No Reply	Le "Manitoba" ne répond plus	Volume 1 of The Secret Ray	Serialized 1936–1937; album format in 1952
The transatlantic liner Manitoba breaks down on its way to England and then the passengers and crew fall strangely asleep. When they wake up it is to find that they have all been robbed of their valuables. Later, while on holiday at the seaside, Jo, Zette and Jocko, playing in a rowing boat, get lost at sea when a thick fog comes down. Rescued by a submarine, they are taken to a secret undersea base where a mad scientist has plans for the two young children.
2	The Eruption of Karamako	L'Eruption du Karamako	Volume 2 of The Secret Ray	Serialized 1936–1937; album format in 1952
Jo, Zette and Jocko escape the undersea base in an amphibious tank, and end up on an island. But their problems are far from over. They have to deal with cannibals, modern-day pirates, an erupting volcano, gangsters, the media and there is still the mad scientist who wants them for his evil plans.
3	Mr. Pump's Legacy	Le Testament de Monsieur Pump	Volume 1 of The Stratoship H-22	Serialized 1937–1939; album format in 1951
Killed while exercising his love for speed in a racing car, American millionaire John Archibald Pump leaves behind ten million US dollars. It will go to the builders of the first aeroplane to fly from Paris to New York at 1000 kilometres per hour. Mr Legrand, Jo and Zette's father sets about designing such a plane, but the project comes under threat from a gang of saboteurs led by William and Fred Stockrise, shortly after Mr Legrand was arrested and detained by the French national police service, the Sûreté, and Jo is seriously injured in a shooting by Werner. The doctor had telephoned to Mrs Legrand about the attempted shooting that Jo is seriously injured but stable and Jo needs plenty of rest. Zette and Jocko paid a brief visit an injured Jo in hospital but Zette had informed the doctor that Jo must rest before he recovers fully. Before leaving the hospital, Zette met Werner and told that Jo did not say a word since the shooting but Werner left. Zette continued her journey on own by foot but she is being approached by two strangers Werner and Charlie before abducting and taking her prisoner in a blue car. With Jo still injured in hospital, both Werner and Charlie go undercover as customs border officers as they seize a van with Zette being bound and gagged onboard before freeing herself, near the French-Belgian border. The detectives and the Sûreté finally set Mr Legrand free. While Jo makes a speedy recovery in hospital surrounded by his family, the two criminals Werner and Charlie are put on trial for the attempted shooting of Jo Legrand and the abduction of Zette Legrand. After the trial, both the criminals are escorted by the police but their custody van is collided by another car and the two criminals escape. That night with the Legrand family asleep, the two intruders break in their house and kidnap Jo but they escape. The next day, the construction of Stratoship H-22 is complete ahead of the flight testing process. The first flight of the Stratoship H-22 took place by their father Mr Legrand and his co-pilot but they suffer a lack of fresh oxygen as they touched down to the airbase. During the dedication ceremony of the Stratoship H-22 by the Legrand's two children, Jocko is found asleep after drinking too much champagne. Pump's passed-over nephews who will only inherit if the ship is not completed within the year after the reading of the will, who go to all lengths, from theft to bombing, to prevent it.
4	Destination New York	Destination New-York	Volume 2 of The Stratoship H-22	Serialized 1937–1939; album format in 1951
When the Stratoship H-22, designed by their father, is the subject of an attempted bombing from the air, Jo and Zette fly it out of its hangar but are unable to get back. Crash-landing near the North Pole, the propeller suffers major damage. The trio are being rescued by an Eskimo as they spend their first day at the igloos during a snowstorm. The next day, the trio start exploring with their Eskimo but Jocko is left behind. Shortly before nightfall during another snowstorm, Jo, Zette and the Eskimo spend another night at the igloo while Jocko remains stranded on the iceberg. As the ship approaches the iceberg but with minor damage, Jocko climbs onboard as he finds refuge in the galley. One of the chefs has found Jocko asleep in the galley after eating too much bananas. After the snowstorm has died down, Jo, Zette and the Eskimo continue their onward journey as they meet Professor Nielsen. At Nielsen's hut, Jo and Zette made good contact progress with Mr Legrand about the journey to the North Pole. As the Stratoship H-22's damaged propeller is repaired by a team of engineers, they face a race against time to get the plane back home and win the trans-Atlantic challenge. Shortly after Jo and Zette left the North Pole, they touch down on a beach packed with tourists. Jo telephoned Mrs Legrand about their time in the North Pole as Mr Legrand had just returned from Scotland. During the night at an empty beach, both policemen were ambushed by the two criminals, Werner and Charlie while guarding the Stratoship H-22. The Stratoship H-22 was almost destroyed by fire by Werner and Charlie. With Jo and Mr Legrand at the scene of the attack, Mr Legrand finally managed to extinguish the fire of the red-coloured plane into the sea. The next day, thousands of crowds are expected to attend the Stratoship H-22's journey to New York piloted by Jo and Zette, with the crew from the French aerospace company S.A.F.C.A., due to arrive while celebrating their victory but unfortunately the celebrations turned sour as they fall into their comas due to a suspected soporific illness. With Mr Legrand on sick leave, Jo and Zette meet a watchman Jules to talk about Mr Legrand's recovery and their upcoming journey to New York but the duo left. While Jo and Zette are flying the Stratoship H-22 en route to New York, Werner wakes up and continued his journey by car but his car has crashed into a tree. Mrs Legrand had telephoned the hospital to the nurse that Werner has been seriously injured in a car crash and Mrs Legrand paid a visit to Werner in hospital who remains seriously injured there following a car crash to recall the memories of the late American millionaire John Archibald Pump and the inheritance to his nephews, William and Fred Stockrise. The Stockrise brothers and their gang are still determined to thwart the operation even if Jo and Zette successfully make it home before the deadline expiry date. With Werner now gone, Charlie and Fred Stockrise are expecting the detectives' arrival but they are caught up in the shooting ambush. One of the Stockrise brothers stood trial to talk about the memories of Werner, Charlie, the Stratoship H-22 and the late millionaire John Archibald Pump. While at the New York airfield, thousands of crowds are expected for the arrival of Jo and Zette as their journey to New York onboard Stratoship H-22 comes to a final stop. In the end, a relieved Jocko is finally being reunited with Jo and Zette after being stranded at the North Pole shortly Jo and Zette had just safely disembarked from the red-coloured plane after a heavy crash landing. While Mr Legrand finally recovers from his illness, Jo, Zette and Jocko arrive at New York to recuperate and on the way there, the trio are questioned by the authorities at the New York Police Station before being cleared and released. In the end, one of the Stockrise brothers is finally arrested and detained by the New York police.
5	The Valley of the Cobras	La Vallée des cobras	Final Volume of The Adventures of Jo Zette and Jocko	Serialized 1939–1940; album format in 1957
The Maharajah of Gopal is a bad-tempered sort of person, whose behaviour ranges from the childish to the eccentric, and his long-suffering secretary Badalah is usually on the receiving end. Nevertheless, Jo and Zette's father agrees to build him a bridge in his kingdom, upsetting a group of scoundrels led by Prime Minister Ramauni, who through the evil fakir Rabindah has been charging caravans to cross the river, alleging the donation to appease the gods, but secretly using a hidden dam system to drown anyone who disobeys their commands. Jo, Zette, their father, and Jocko work to save the bridge and expose the evildoers to Maharajah.

== Characters ==
The Legrand family

- Jo Legrand is the oldest of the Legrand children. He is the son of Mr and Mrs Legrand.
- Zette Legrand is the youngest of the Legrand children. She is the sister of Jo Legrand and the daughter of Mr and Mrs Legrand.
- Jocko is Jo and Zette's pet chimpanzee.
- Mr. Legrand is Jo and Zette's father. He works for S.A.F.C.A. (a French Aerospace Company) as a designer and aviation engineer.
- Mrs. Legrand is Jo and Zette's mother and also Mr Legrand's wife. She looks after her children at home.

Recurring characters

- Werner and Charlie Brooke are the two villains in both Mr. Pump's Legacy and Destination New York.
- Fred Stockrise and William Stockrise are Mr. Pump's two nephews. They are also both villains appearing in both Mr. Pump's Legacy and Destination New York.

Others

- The mad scientist (The Manitoba No Reply & The Eruption of Karamako)
- Professor Nielsen (Destination New York)
- Eskimo (Destination New York)
- Maharajah of Gopal (The Valley of the Cobras)

== History ==
=== Background ===
Beginning a series of newspaper supplements in late 1928, Abbé Norbert Wallez founded a supplement for children, Le Petit Vingtième (The Little Twentieth), which subsequently appeared in Le XXe Siècle every Thursday. Carrying strong Catholic and fascist messages, many of its passages were explicitly antisemitic. For this new venture, Hergé illustrated L'Extraordinaire Aventure de Flup, Nénesse, Poussette et Cochonnet (The Extraordinary Adventure of Flup, Nénesse, Poussette and Cochonnet), a comic strip authored by one of the paper's sport columnists, which told the story of two boys, one of their little sisters, and her inflatable rubber pig. Hergé was unsatisfied, and eager to write and draw a comic strip of his own. He was fascinated by new techniques in the medium – such as the systematic use of speech bubbles – found in such American comics as George McManus' Bringing up Father, George Herriman's Krazy Kat and Rudolph Dirks's Katzenjammer Kids, copies of which had been sent to him from Mexico by the paper's reporter Léon Degrelle, stationed there to report on the Cristero War.

=== Publication ===
Jo, Zette and Jocko in Cœurs Vaillants

In late 1935 Hergé was visited by Abbot Courtois and Abbot Pihan, the editors of Cœurs Vaillants ("Valiant Hearts"), a French Catholic newspaper that was publishing The Adventures of Tintin. Courtois was often unhappy with elements of Hergé's work, and had recently complained about a scene in his latest story, The Broken Ear, in which the two antagonists drown and are dragged to Hell by demons. On this occasion, he asked Hergé to create new characters who would be more relateable for their young readership. Whereas Tintin had no parents and did not go to school, they wanted a series in which the protagonists had a family and acted more "normal"; they also requested that these characters have their adventures in France.

Hergé did not want to displease the editors, recognising that Cœurs Vaillants was his only foothold in the French market at the time. He later related that "I happened to have some toys at home just then, for an advertising project I was working on, and among them was a monkey named Jocko. And so I based a new little family around Jocko, really just to please the gentlemen from Cœurs Vaillants, telling myself they might have the right idea." Taking on Jo, Zette, and Jocko alongside The Adventures of Tintin and Quick & Flupke, Hergé soon found himself overworked, and put the latter series on the back burner.

The first Jo, Zette & Jocko adventure was titled The Secret Ray, and began serialisation in Cœurs Vaillants on 19 January 1936. It would continue to appear in the newspaper in installments until June 1937, throughout being printed in red and black. Several months later it also began to appear in the pages of Le Petit Vingtième. For New Year 1938, Hergé designed a special cover for Le Petit Vingtième in which the characters of Jo, Zette and Jocko were featured alongside those from The Adventures of Tintin and Quick & Flupke.

Hergé was unhappy with the series, commenting that its characters "bored me terribly, these parents who wept all the time as they searched for their children who had gone off in all directions. The characters didn't have the total freedom enjoyed by Tintin... Think of Jules Renard's phrase 'Not everyone can be an orphan!' How lucky for Tintin; he is an orphan, and so he is free."

== Le Thermozéro ==
Le Thermozéro is the sixth, incomplete, Jo, Zette and Jocko adventure. It began in 1958 as a Tintin adventure of the same name. The Tintin version is also known as Tintin et le Thermozéro. Hergé had asked the French comic book creator Greg (Michel Regnier) to provide a scenario for a new Tintin story. Greg came up with two potential plots: Les Pilules (The Pills) and Le Thermozéro. Hergé made sketches of the first eight pages of Le Thermozéro before the project was abandoned in 1960, Hergé deciding that he wished to retain sole creative control of his work.

Sometime after this, Hergé sought to resurrect Le Thermozéro as a Jo, Zette and Jocko adventure and instructed his long-time collaborator Bob de Moor to work on an outline. Bernard Tordeur of the Hergé Foundation stated in 2004 that enough archival material from the project existed to someday publish a book.

== Critical analysis ==
Commenting on The Secret Ray, Hergé biographer Benoît Peeters noted that it "used rather conventional elements to vivid effect", using many clichés from popular novels such as a robot, a mad scientist, and gullible cannibals. He criticised the characters as being "so colorless that we can hardly bring ourselves to care what befalls them." When discussing its sequel, The Stratoship H-22, he thought that it had been "conceived in almost a single burst" from a "general framework", in this way operating in a more linear fashion than he did with his Adventures of Tintin. He felt that the series' "failure" was not inevitable, as evidence noting that comics series involving families, such as George McManus' Bringing up Father, could be popular.

== Translations ==
=== English ===
The Valley of the Cobras was the first Jo, Zette and Jocko adventure to be translated and published in English in 1986. Mr Pump's Legacy and Destination New York followed in 1987.

The 'Manitoba' No Reply and The Eruption of Karamako remained unpublished (possibly due to Hergé’s unsympathetic depiction of the primitive natives of the island of Karamako, similar to Tintin in the Congo) until 1994 when they were published together in a single limited-edition double volume titled The Secret Ray.

=== Farsi ===
While The Adventures of Tintin were published in the early 1970s in Iran, all of Jo, Zette and Jocko books got translated to Farsi and published in the early 1980s almost at the same time by "Original"(اوریژینال) publication for the first time. The 'Manitoba' No Reply (Le Manitoba ne répond plus) was translated with title "آدم آهنی" (Adam Ahani=Iron Man), The Eruption of Karamako (L'Eruption du Karamako) was translated "انفجار کاراماکو" (Enfejareh Karamako), Mr. Pump's Legacy (Le Testament de Monsieur Pump) was translated "جنون سرعت" (Jonoon Soraat=Speed Maniac), Destination New York (Destination New York) was translated "مقصد نیویورک" (Magsad Neyoyork), The Valley of the Cobras (La Vallée des cobras) was translated "دره مارها" (Dareh Marha=Valley of Snakes).

== Legacy ==
Jo, Zette and Jocko appear on the rear covers of some Tintin comics, but never in the stories. A few Jo, Zette and Jocko comics allude to Tintin characters or events, such as the Maharaja of Gopal (briefly mentioned in The Castafiore Emerald) appearing as a prominent character and a portrait of Captain Haddock in the Legrand house.

== See also ==
- The Adventures of Tintin, popular Belgian comic series created by Hergé.
- Ligne claire
