= Tintin and the Lake of Sharks =

French-Belgian animated film

- French-language film poster
- Directed by: Raymond Leblanc
- Screenplay by: Jos Marissen; Eddie Lateste; Rainer Gocksch; Jean-Michel Charlier
- Story by: Greg
- Based on: Characters by Hergé
- Produced by: Raymond Leblanc
- Starring: Jacques Careuil; Georges Atlas; Jacques Balutin; Nadine Basile
- Cinematography: François Léonard; Jean Midre
- Edited by: Jean-Pierre Cereghetti
- Music by: François Rauber; Songs: Joseph Noël
- Production companies: Belvision Studios; Dargaud Films
- Distributed by: United Artists (Les Artistes Associés)
- Release date: 13 December 1972 (France)
- Running time: 76 minutes
- Countries: France; Belgium
- Language: French

Tintin and the Lake of Sharks (French: Tintin et le lac aux requins) is a 1972 French-Belgian animated adventure film based on The Adventures of Tintin, directed by Raymond Leblanc. It was not written by Hergé (who merely supervised), but by his friend, Belgian comics creator Greg (Michel Regnier). It was later adapted into a comic book with still images from the film used as illustrations.

== Plot ==
One night, in Brussels, Belgium, a pair of criminals discreetly break into the aquarium and steal a large priceless pearl. As soon as the security guards on duty see the empty shell, they rush away to raise the alarm. The criminals take advantage of the guards' absence by discreetly placing a fake pearl, the same size as the real one, in the shell. When the guards return with the director and the director sees the fake pearl, he thinks the guards were making it up, but then has second thoughts about the incident as a similar case happened at another museum two weeks before.

Meanwhile, Tintin, Snowy and Captain Haddock arrive in Syldavia, a country in the Balkans. They have come to join their friend Professor Calculus who has rented a villa near a lake in order to build his latest invention. At the airport they run into Thompson and Thomson, who are also heading for Calculus on a special mission.

The four men and dog fly by hired plane to Calculus' house, but during the flight they get into some engine trouble and the pilot bails out with the only parachute. Tintin attempts to safely land the plane, but it ends up on the edge of a cliff and on fire. They are saved with the help of two local children, Niko and his sister Nushka, and their dog Gustav. But as it turns out, the crash was deliberately set up, as the pilot contacts his superior ("Mr. Big"/"King Shark") via a walkie-talkie, hidden in his binoculars, to inform him that the plan has failed.

The children give their new friends a lift in their wagon, but as they learn of their destination, they warn them that there is a curse on the lake, at the bottom of which is an old submerged town. The party finally arrives at Calculus' villa where he demonstrates his invention: a camera which can project holographic images. His ultimate aim is to create a machine which will make actual copies of physical objects. Later, over dinner, Thompson and Thomson explain that they are Calculus' bodyguards as they suspect that a criminal organization specializing in making art forgeries wants to steal his machine. Eventually, everybody goes to bed. In the middle of the night, Snowy wakes up Tintin at one point after hearing a noise outside, but Tintin shakes it off as bird calls. In fact, the noise is made by Calculus' housekeeper, Madame Flik, who is in league with "Mr. Big" as well.

Next morning, while Tintin explores the local country with Niko and Nushka (unaware that there are cameras spying on his every move), and the Captain and the detectives play a game of golf, Snowy runs into a frogman who has obtained from Madame Black some plans stolen from Calculus' laboratory. The frogman escapes by jumping into the lake, but Snowy manages to bite off a part of one of his flippers. After the Captain and the detectives tell Tintin what has happened, he gives the dogs the bitten-off flipper to sniff. While Gustav leads Haddock to a pile of abandoned tires, Tintin follows Snowy to a buried chain which, when pulled, opens a passage to a hidden cave where the criminals have stashed the stolen art. After getting sealed inside the cave, Tintin finds an underwater tunnel leading out to the lake. On his way through, Tintin gets trapped by a wire net, but Snowy (who remained outside the cave) dives in and chews through the net, saving Tintin from drowning.

Back at home, Calculus demonstrates his new invention to the children—a machine that can copy any object from a piece of special soap. Unfortunately the effects are as yet short-lived, as the copied objects shortly turn back into their original substance. The criminals attack Calculus and the detectives with laughing gas and take the children away. Tintin and Haddock pursue them but fail to rescue Niko and Nushka. The criminals leave behind a message on a tape player from their leader, "King Shark", who tells the heroes (with a voice which is startingly familiar to Tintin) that they will get the children back in return for Calculus' invention. Tintin himself is to do the exchange and is not to call the police.

Tintin, Haddock, Calculus and the detectives search the house for bugs, and Tintin discovers a secret passage that leads to Madame Black's walkie-talkie hidden in the empty well, catching Madam Black in the process. Tintin decides to contact the police and comes up with a ruse to cover his tracks. Tintin and Snowy set off to the local town and just happen to meet their old friend, the opera singer Bianca Castafiore, who gives him a lift in her car to the town and even helps him in getting to the police. The chief of police listens to his story, but he is limited in what he can do since half the lake is in the jurisdiction of Borduria, a rival nation, and there are thus risks of a diplomatic incident.

Two days pass before Tintin finally returns to Calculus' house with the shark-like submarine which Calculus built during the search for Red Rackham's Treasure. The plan is that Tintin will meet the crooks on the beach, and Haddock will follow him in the sub. At the meeting point, criminals pick Tintin up in a submarine, and they head underwater to the flooded city where their base is situated. The mastermind behind this operation is revealed to be none other than Tintin's nemesis Rastapopoulos, now calling himself "King Shark"/"Mr. Big". Rastapopoulos promises to set Niko and Nushka free for the device, but, unaware of Tintin's arrival, the children escape from their cell and hijack an underwater tank.

Rastapopoulos takes over control of the tank with his computer, but he then notices Captain Haddock's sub on his monitor and uses the tank to fire torpedoes at Haddock, which provokes a fight between Tintin and the other gangsters as he attempts to stop Rastapopoulos. Haddock's mini-sub is hit, jamming its propulsion, and the tank is returned to the base by remote control. While waiting for the children to return, Rastapopoulos takes Tintin to his office and shows him his art collection, gloating that with Calculus' machine, they can make multiple copies of all the stolen masterpieces and sell them off for huge amounts of money.

Rastapopoulos tries out Calculus' machine by cloning a cigar box, but the imitation proves highly unstable and grows to monstrous size, almost crushing Rastapopoulos and his lieutenant. In a rage, Rastapopoulos locks Tintin and the children in a chamber, but then learns that police boats are patrolling the lake. He therefore decides to evacuate the base and orders his men to take all the art he has in the underwater city to the cave. He then floods the chamber Tintin and the children are in with water. As soon as the water has reached a device high on the wall, the base will self-destruct.

Haddock manages to regain control of the disabled submarine and makes his way to the surface, encountering Thompson and Thomson and the chief of the Syldavian police in a patrol boat. Down below, with all of his men having evacuated the base, Rastapopoulos and his lieutenant leave the base in the submarine. Tintin and the children manage to get free and escape through an airlock in life jackets, just before the base explodes. They then reach the surface and rejoin their friends and the police. The police have captured all of Rastapopoulos' men, but the mastermind himself has already crossed the border in his submarine. Since they are not Syldavian officials and therefore not bound by international conventions, Tintin and Haddock insist in going after Rastapopoulos in a motor boat.

In order to pass the border posts, Rastapopoulos tries to navigate the sub through an underwater tunnel, but forgets to lower the sub's periscope, which hits a low rock and breaks, causing the sub to crash and get flooded. The villains make for the surface, but they are captured by Tintin and Haddock as soon as they attempt to leave the wrecked vessel. In the end, the Thompsons, Calculus, Niko, Nushka, and Gustav welcome Tintin, Snowy and Haddock back from their submarine vessel mission. Finally, Rastapopoulos and his seamen are taken away to Klow Prison by Syldavian Police Officials. Tintin, Snowy and Haddock return to Calculus' villa and are welcomed by a huge party of villagers who want to celebrate the end of the terror imposed by the gang, and Bianca Castafiore, who makes Haddock flee the party. Haddock tries to have a quiet moment to drink some whiskey, but gets his bottle destroyed by the Thompson twins playing golf. Initially, the captain is annoyed but laughs over it with everyone.

== Cast ==
Character	Original	English
Tintin	Jacques Careuil	Unknown
Captain Haddock	Claude Bertrand	Unknown
The TV commentator	Pierre Collet	Unknown
Bianca Castafiore	Micheline Dax	Unknown
Roberto Rastapopoulos	Serge Nadaud	Unknown
The cleaning lady	Nathalie Nerval	Unknown
The police commander	Alain Nobis	Unknown
Thompson	Guy Piérauld	Unknown
Thomson	Paul Rieger	Unknown
The bandit with the walkie-talkie	Michel Thomas	Unknown
Niko	Jacques Vinitzki	Unknown
Nushka	Marie Vinitzki	Unknown
Professor Calculus	Henri Virlojeux	Unknown

=== Additional Voices ===
- Georges Atlas
- Jacques Balutin
- Nadine Basile
- Edmond Bernard
- Jacqueline Brasseur
- Jacques Ciron
- Jacques Ferriere
- Georges Hubert
- Maurice Nasil
- Nicolas Youmatoff

== See also ==
- The Adventures of Tintin
- The Adventures of Jo, Zette and Jocko
- Quick and Flupke

== Bibliography ==
- Tintin and the Lake of Sharks, 44pp, first UK edition published by Methuen, 1973. ISBN 9780416789508
