= Rastapopoulos =

Comic character by Belgian cartoonist Hergé

Publication information
- Publisher: Casterman (Belgium)
- First appearance: Tintin in America (non-officially); Cigars of the Pharaoh (officially) (both stories published in Le Petit Vingtième in 1932)
- Created by: Hergé

In-story information
- Full name: Roberto Rastapopoulos
- Partnerships: List of main characters
- Supporting character of: Tintin

Roberto Rastapopoulos is a fictional character who is a featured villain in several entries in The Adventures of Tintin, the comics series by Belgian cartoonist Hergé. He first appears in Cigars of the Pharaoh (1932) and is a criminal mastermind with multiple identities, whose activities frequently bring him in conflict with his archenemy Tintin.

== Character history ==
=== Early development ===
A visual prototype for Rastapopoulos appears in Tintin in America, where he is among the assembled dignitaries at a Chicago banquet held in Tintin's honour. Here he is seated next to the actress Mary Pikefort, an allusion to the real-life actress Mary Pickford. Michael Farr asserted that this was indeed a depiction of Rastapopoulos, and that it would be expected for a film director to be seated next to a Hollywood actress. The name "Rastapopoulos" had been invented by one of Hergé's friends; Hergé thought it was hilarious and decided to use it. He devised Rastapopoulos as an Italian-American with a Greek surname, as a Greek American, or simply as a Greek born on the island of Leros. Despite allegations of antisemitism, Hergé was adamant that the character was not Jewish. With his lampooned Greek surname, large nose and morally dubious involvement in shipping, Hergé arguably modelled Rastapopoulous off Greek shipping tycoon Aristotle Onassis.

The prototype for Rastapopoulos in Tintin in America, seated next to Mary Pikefort.

Hergé first introduced the character of Rastapopoulos in Cigars of the Pharaoh, which was serialised in Le Petit Vingtième from 8 December 1932 to 8 February 1934.

Tintin runs into him at the start of the adventure aboard the M.S. Isis, a cruise ship docking at Egypt. Here, the Egyptologist Sophocles Sarcophagus bumps into Rastapopoulos, and Rastapopoulos threatens to beat him until Tintin intervenes. He then shouts at Tintin, accusing him of being an "Impudent whipper-snapper!" Tintin recognises Rastapopoulos, commenting that he is "the millionaire film tycoon, king of Cosmos Pictures... And it's not the first time we've met..." Later in the story, Tintin runs into Rastapopoulos again, this time running into his desert film set, interrupting an apparent assault on a young woman before realizing that it was only part of the film. Although many of the actors are annoyed, Rastapopoulos is affable, and invites Tintin into his tent where, over a pot of Turkish coffee, Tintin informs him of everything that has happened to him since leaving the cruise ship, and Rastapololous subsequently provides him with clothes and directions to another village. Farr noted that this idea of the hero mistakenly trusting the villain was one that had been used by John Buchan and Alfred Hitchcock, the latter of whom was an influence on Hergé.

Rastapopoulos reappears— this time disguised in a trench-coat and hat— at the end of the story, where he and a fakir kidnap the crown prince of Gaipajama in vengeance for the Maharajah's war against the opium trade. Tintin pursues them, and a car chase ensues, before Tintin encounters the still-disguised Rastapopoulos on a rocky mountainside, with the criminal boss apparently falling to his death when the cliff-ledge he is on breaks under his foot.

Hergé reintroduced Rastapopoulos in the following adventure, The Blue Lotus, which was set in China and dealt with the Japanese invasion of Manchuria. In one scene, Tintin hides in a Shanghai cinema that is screening The Sheik's House, Rastapopoulos' film that Tintin witnessed being filmed in the preceding story, later learning that Rastapopoulos, currently staying in the city, was the last person to see a famous doctor who Tintin believes could cure the dangerous poison of madness (Although he accepts Rastapopoulos' story that he dropped the doctor off at his house after a party). At the end of The Blue Lotus, Rastapopoulos is exposed as the leader of the international opium smuggling organisation that Tintin had previously battled in Cigars of the Pharaoh, and is subsequently imprisoned.

=== Later appearances ===
Rastapopoulos subsequently resurfaces in the guise of the Marquis di Gorgonzola, a millionaire magnate and slave trader in The Red Sea Sharks, having been forced to assume a new identity after he was arrested for his previous crimes. When Tintin, Haddock, and Skut end up on his yacht (a caricature of Aristotle Onassis' luxurious yacht Christina), he tricks them into getting on Allan's ship, which he later tries to have torpedoed after the crew evacuate and a plan to destroy it in a fire fails. Rastapopulos fakes his death by making his boat sink, while escaping in a submarine from the bottom. (In The Castafiore Emerald, Bianca Castafiore mentions that the media has inaccurately claimed she was engaged to be married to the Marquis di Gorgonzola.)

He later kidnaps the millionaire Laszlo Carreidas in Flight 714 to Sydney to gain the number of his multi-million Swiss Bank account, concluding that it is easier to steal Carreidas's money than make his own fortune all over again. When he is accidentally injected with truth serum by Dr. Krollspell, he reveals various evil deeds, such as his plan to kill Dr. Krollspell afterwards. He is taken hostage by Tintin. Like Krollspell and Carreidas, he is tied up and gagged with sticking plaster. Throughout the course of the story he suffers more and more injuries. First when Haddock breaks his gun chasing Rastapopoulos, he throws part of it away, and it hits the hiding Rastapopoulos on the head. When he continues to run away and is called to by Allan, he is distracted and crashes into a tree. He experiences pain to the face when Allan pulls the sticking plaster off. When Allan is about to throw a grenade at Tintin and Co, he remembers that Rastapopoulos wants Carreidas alive and throws it away. Rastapopoulos is caught in the blast, leaving his clothes in tatters. When Allan pulls Carreidas' hat from under a stone head, he accidentally elbows Rastapopoulos, giving him a black eye. Later his bump on the head goes away, which he takes as a good omen. However a piece of rock falls onto his head just after he notices this as the result of an earthquake, causing another bump. When explosives are used by the gang to break through a stone barrier, a volcanic eruption is set off, forcing them to flee from the Island in a rubber dinghy. He and his gang are hypnotized by Mik Kanrokitoff and taken onto a UFO. What happens next to them is unrevealed.

In 1972 Rastapopoulos also appears in Tintin and the Lake of Sharks, an animated film and later adapted into a similarly titled book. In this story written by a friend of Hergé, Rastapopoulos is a criminal gang leader directing operations from a secret underwater base. He is behind numerous robberies of valuable items around the world and plans to steal a duplicating machine invented by Professor Calculus, allowing him to replace the items with perfect fakes so that nobody will know of his crimes. However while trying to escape by submarine after his activities are exposed, he is captured by Tintin and Haddock, and arrested by the Syldavian Police.

In the unfinished Tintin and Alph-Art, a character often thought to be Rastapopoulos in disguise—under the name of Endaddine Akass—appears. Although a page revealing Akass to be Rastapopoulos was started (and printed in the 2004 Egmont edition), as the book was never completed, Rastapopoulos' fate following Flight 714 to Sydney is unknown. In the 2004 Yves Rodier adaptation of the Tintin and Alph-Art has Rastapopoulos vs Tintin in one last final showdown.

In 1996 Rastapopoulos appears in the pastiche Destination World by Didier Savard, a pastiche authorized by the Hergé Foundation to celebrate Tintin's 70th birthday and the Comics Festival in Angoulême. A disguised Rastapopoulos is shot with a gun by unknown assailants passing in a car in front of the building Le Monde.

== Critical analysis ==
Michael Farr argued that the relationship between Tintin and Rastapopoulos was akin to that between Sherlock Holmes and Professor Moriarty in Arthur Conan Doyle's stories. Farr thought that Rastapopoulos was the one enemy who "it must be feared, might one day get the better of him."

== See also ==
- List of The Adventures of Tintin characters
