= Tintin and Alph-Art =

Comic album by Belgian cartoonist Hergé

Tintin and Alph-Art (Tintin et l'Alph-Art)
- Cover of the English-language edition (2004 edition)
- Date: 1986
- Series: The Adventures of Tintin
- Publisher: Casterman

Creative team
- Creator: Hergé

Original publication
- Language: French

Translation
- Publisher: Egmont/Sundancer
- Date: 1990
- Translator: Leslie Lonsdale-Cooper; Michael Turner

Chronology
- Preceded by: Tintin and the Picaros (1976)

Tintin and Alph-Art (French: Tintin et l'Alph-Art) is the unfinished twenty-fourth and final volume of The Adventures of Tintin, the comics series by Belgian cartoonist Hergé. Left incomplete on Hergé's death, the manuscript was posthumously published in 1986. The story revolves around Brussels' modern art scene, where the young reporter Tintin discovers that a local art dealer has been murdered. Investigating further, he encounters a conspiracy of art forgery, masterminded by a religious teacher named Endaddine Akass.

Reflecting his own fascination for modern art, Hergé began work on Tintin and Alph-Art in 1978. However, it was left unfinished at the time of his death in March 1983. At this point it consisted of around 150 pages of pencil-drawn notes, outlines and sketches — not yet rendered in Hergé's trademark ligne claire drawing style — with no ending having been devised for the story. Hergé's colleague Bob de Moor offered to complete the story for publication, and while Hergé's widow Fanny Vlamynck initially agreed, she changed her decision, citing the fact that her late husband had not wanted anyone else to continue The Adventures of Tintin.

A selection of the original notes were collected together and published in book form by Casterman in 1986. Since that point, several other cartoonists, such as Yves Rodier, have produced their own finished, unauthorized versions of the story. Critical reception of the work has been mixed; some commentators on The Adventures of Tintin believe that if Tintin and Alph-Art had been completed, it would have been an improvement over the previous two volumes (Flight 714 to Sydney and Tintin and the Picaros), while others have characterised such assessments as wishful thinking.

== Synopsis ==
Tintin and Captain Haddock receive a phone call from their friend, the opera singer Bianca Castafiore, who informs them about a new spiritual leader whom she has begun following, Endaddine Akass, stating her intention to stay at his villa in Ischia. Later that day, Haddock enters the Fourcart Gallery in Brussels, where Jamaican avant-garde artist Ramó Nash convinces him to purchase one of his "Alph-Art" works, a perspex letter "H" ("Personalph-Art"). The gallery's owner, Henri Fourcart, arranges to meet Tintin, but is killed in a car accident while on his way to do so. Tintin begins to investigate, discovering that Fourcart's death was murder. Tintin and Haddock attend one of Akass' lectures; there, Tintin recognises Akass' voice, but is unsure why. Investigating further, he concludes that Akass was spying on Fourcart through a micro-transmitter hidden in a pendant worn by the latter's assistant, Martine Vandezande. Tintin soon faces two attacks designed to kill him, but survives both.

To further his investigations, Tintin decides to visit Akass' villa. Arriving at Ischia, Tintin and Haddock receive death threats warning them to leave. When Castafiore hears that they are on the island, she welcomes them to Akass' villa, informing them that Akass is currently in Rome. At the villa, they meet a number of acquaintances, the corrupt industrialists W.R. Gibbons (from The Blue Lotus) and R.W. Trickler (from The Broken Ear), Emir Ben Kalish Ezab (from Land of Black Gold), Luigi Randazzo (a singer), and Ramó Nash. Tintin and Haddock stay the night at the villa on Castafiore's insistence. During the night, Tintin witnesses men loading canvases into a van, and exploring the villa discovers a room full of faked paintings by prominent artists. He is discovered by Akass, who informs him that he uses Nash's "Alph-Art" as a front for his criminal forgery business. Akass declares his intention to kill Tintin by having him covered in liquid polyester and sold as a work of art by César Baldaccini.

== History ==
=== Background ===
In 1976, a few months after the publication of Tintin and the Picaros, Hergé told the journalist Numa Sadoul that he was contemplating setting the next Adventure of Tintin in an airport lounge. This idea was dropped, and in 1978, he decided to set the story in the world of modern art. During his later years, Hergé had grown increasingly interested in this subject and decided to incorporate his love of avant-garde artwork into the new story. Being a regular at Brussels' art galleries and exhibitions, he was able to draw directly upon his experiences in the art scene when producing the story. Given his age, and the length of time that it was taking him to produce each Adventure, British literary critic Michael Farr suggested that Hergé likely knew that this would be his final installment in the series.

The last panel in the book and in the series drawn shortly before Hergé's death

Hergé initially titled this new work Tintin et les Faussaires ("Tintin and the Forgers") before changing this working title to Tintin et L'Alph-Art. The story's main antagonist, Endaddine Akass, was based on a real-life art forger, Fernand Legros, whom Hergé had learned about through reading a biography of him. The Akass character was also influenced by an article about the Indian guru Rajneesh which Hergé had read in a December 1982 edition of the Paris Match. In Hergé's notes, he included the idea of revealing that Akass was Tintin's nemesis, Rastapopoulos, in disguise, with Farr believing that this plot twist would have been revealed had Hergé completed the story. Conversely, Harry Thompson suggested that Hergé had dropped Rastapopoulos from the story in 1980. Hergé's notes reveal that he considered various different names for the artist character, including Ramon Hasj and Ramo Nasj, before settling on Ramó Nash. Similarly, he had initially debated whether Nash should be a painter or a sculptor, before deciding on the latter.

Three months before he died, Hergé stated that "unfortunately I cannot say much about this forthcoming Tintin adventure because, though I started it three years ago, I have not had much time to work on it and still do not know how it will turn out. I know very roughly where I am going ... I am continuing my research and I really do not know where this story will lead me". Upon his death, Hergé left around one hundred and fifty pages of pencil sketches for the story. The story had no ending, and is left on a cliffhanger, with Tintin's fate left unexplained.

Hergé's main assistant, Bob de Moor, showed an interest in completing the book following Hergé's death. As De Moor explained, "Personally I would have loved to finish Alph-Art. It would have been a tribute to Hergé. Fanny Remi asked me to finish it, and I began work on it, but after a few months she changed her mind. I didn't insist, but for me it was logical that there was a studio, there were artists in the studio, Casterman asked for it to be finished, there were twenty-three finished books, that one story was not finished; so I had to finish it". In the end, Fanny decided Hergé would not have approved and the book must remain unfinished. Hergé had made it clear that he did not want anyone else to continue The Adventures of Tintin after his death, informing Sadoul that "after me there will be no more Tintin. Tintin is my creation—my blood, my sweat, my guts".

=== Publication ===
Fanny ultimately decided that Hergé's unfinished sketches could be published in book form. To do so, the sketches were edited by a team of experts, including Benoît Peeters, Michel Bareau and Jean-Manuel Duvivier, with forty-four being selected for publication. The book produced devoted one half to reproducing the sketches, and the other to producing a transcript of Hergé's text for the story. Published on 8 October 1986 by Casterman, it proved to be a bestseller despite its high cover price. An English language translation was published in 1990.

== Critical analysis ==
"Hergé's final, incomplete book Tintin and Alph-Art betrays in its massive self-reflexiveness a desire to be taken seriously, to be seen to be considering the highly conceptual issues in contemporary art with which its author is clearly au fait, alongside a desire to mock the highness of the establishment that never accepted him as highbrow, to expose its pretentiousness, its fraudulence".

— Tom McCarthy, 2006

For Michael Farr, Tintin and Alph-Art provided "an almost perfect ending to more than fifty years of defying danger, threats to his life and a succession of villains". He believed that it was "full of a vigour and enthusiasm disappointingly absent from the two previous adventures", and that as a result "it promised to be Hergé's most accomplished Tintin story for twenty years". Jean-Marc Lofficier and Randy Lofficier stated that had the story been completed, it "may have turned out to be a smaller-scale, unpretentious yet far more exciting and true-to-life adventure" than various recent volumes. Hergé biographer Benoît Peeters felt that "despite its limitations, and perhaps on account of them, this unfinished story fits perfectly alongside the other 23 Tintin adventures. Full of promise, it ends the series admirably by leaving the last word to every reader's imagination". Philippe Goddin opined that Tintin and Alph-Art's opening "promised much, coming like new breath".

In a later publication, Peeters expressed a different view, stating that "one cannot help but feel disappointed" with Alph-Art. Similarly, Harry Thompson expressed the view that Hergé would never have completed the story, and that while "many critics like to think... Tintin and Alph-Art was set to be Hergé's last great masterpiece", he disagreed, describing this as "surely just wishful thinking". He added that it could be seen as "a nostalgic, or regressive book, depending on your point of view".

The literary critic Tom McCarthy suggested that some of the early scenes of the book "take the form almost of Platonic dialogues, dramatized theoretical discussions about art itself", although later in the book Hergé turns to revealing "the deeper and more essential Platonic truth of art: that it is fake, that its whole currency is fakeness". Discussing the final scene in the book, he opined that it "reads like a snuff movie: not of Tintin, ultimately, but of Hergé". Further, he argued that Tintin and Alph-Art reflected a number of themes that also appear in other Adventures of Tintin; these include the idea of Castafiore bridging the connection between the protagonist and the villains, and the concept of Haddock being confronted "with his own inauthenticity", in this case through purchasing a giant plastic 'H' artwork.

== Adaptations and exhibitions ==
Frames from the opening page of Rodier's version of the book

Other artists have produced a number of pastiche versions of the story, which provide their own endings. In 1987, a version was completed by an artist using the pseudonym of Ramó Nash. Several further versions were produced by the Canadian artist Yves Rodier during the 1990s. A further version appeared in the 1990s, produced by an individual known as Regric.

In honour of Hergé's legacy, the awards given at the Angoulême International Comics Festival were named Alph-Art Awards, having previously been named after Alain Saint-Ogan's character Alfred.

In November 2015, Somerset House in London held the exhibition "Tintin: Hergé's Masterpiece", which featured the final sketch from Tintin and Alph-Art as one of its displays.
