= List of The Adventures of Tintin characters =

The main and several supporting characters of The Adventures of Tintin, the comics series by Hergé. In the centre are Tintin and Snowy (from The Castafiore Emerald)

This is the list of fictional characters in The Adventures of Tintin, the comics series by Belgian cartoonist Hergé. The characters are listed alphabetically, grouped by the main characters, the antagonists, and the supporting characters. Before the list, there is an index of characters for each of the 24 albums.

The supporting characters Hergé created for his series have been described as far more developed than the central character, each imbued with a strength of character and depth of personality that has been compared with that of the characters of Charles Dickens. Hergé used the supporting characters to create a realistic world in which to set his protagonists' adventures. To further the realism and continuity, characters recur throughout the series.

Hergé was forced to focus on characterisation during the German occupation of Belgium during World War II to avoid depicting troublesome political situations. The public responded positively. Colourful main characters, villainous antagonists, and heroic supporting cast were introduced during the series.

== Index of characters by album ==
=== Tintin in the Land of the Soviets ===
- Tintin (debut)
- Snowy (debut)
- Vlipvlop (Coloured version: Wirchwlov)
- Nokzitov (Coloured version: Lulitzosov)
- Vladimir
- Borschtisov (Coloured version: Boustringovitch)

=== Tintin in the Congo ===
- Tintin
- Snowy
- Coco
- Al Capone (MENTIONED ONLY)
- Tom (Tintin in the Congo)
- The Babaorum (Black and White Edition: The Babaoro'm)
- The M'Hatuvu (Black and White Edition: The M'Hatavu)
- Muganga
- The missionary
- Jimmy MacDuff
- Gibbons (Tintin in the Congo)
- Thomson and Thompson (cameo)
- Studios Hergé members (cameo)
- Jo, Zette and Jocko(cameo at back cover)
- Quick and Flupke(cameo,cameo at back cover)

=== Tintin in America ===
- Tintin
- Snowy
- Big Chief Keen-eyed-Mole
- Bobby Smiles
- Al Capone
- Mike MacAdam
- Tom (Tintin in America)
- Bugsy Kidnap
- Maurice Oyle
- Butch
- Pietro
- Nick
- Browsing Bison
- Bull's Eye
- Lame Duck
- Jem and Slim
- Pedro Ramirez
- Fred
- Big Jim
- Jake
- Billy Bolivar
- Rastapopoulos (cameo)

=== Cigars of the Pharaoh ===
- Tintin
- Snowy
- Thomson and Thompson (debut)
- Sophocles Sarcophagus
- The fakir
- The gunrunner
- Allan
- Rastapopoulos
- Patrash Pasha
- Mr. and Mrs. Snowball
- Oliveira da Figueira
- Maharaja of Gaipajama
- Crown prince of Gaipajama
- Reverend Peacock
- Zloty
- Studios Hergé members (cameo)
- (Destination Moon comic book (color version ONLY))

=== The Blue Lotus ===
- Tintin
- Snowy
- Thomson and Thompson
- Maharaja of Gaipajama
- Chang Chong-Chen
- Wang Chen-Yee
- Gibbons
- Dawson
- Mitsuhirato
- The fakir
- Rastapopoulos
- Crown prince of Gaipajama
- Professor Fang Hsi-ying
- Yamato
- Ramacharma

=== The Broken Ear ===
- Tintin
- Snowy
- Alonso Pérez and Ramón Bada
- General Alcazar
- General Tapioca
- Trickler
- Corporal Diaz
- Basil Bazarov
- Pablo
- Ridgewell
- The Arumbayas
- Thomson and Thompson
- Professor Euclide
- Rodrigo Tortilla
- The Rumbabas
- Caraco
- Karamelo
- Ernestine
- Colonel Barker
- Colonel Jimenez
- Colonel Juanitos
- Jacob Balthazar
- J. Balthazar
- A.J. Walker
- Lopez
- Rodriguez
- Samuel Goldbarr
- Studios Hergé members (cameo)

=== The Black Island ===
- Tintin
- Snowy
- Thomson and Thompson
- Dr. Müller
- Puschov
- Ivan
- Ranko
- Nurse and Doctor
- Fred the fireman
- Scotsman at the Kiltoch Arms
- Christopher Willoughby-Drupe and Marco Rizotto (cameo)
- Police team
- unnamed scottish farmer

=== King Ottokar's Sceptre ===
- Tintin
- Snowy
- Thomson and Thompson
- Professor Alembick
- King Muskar XII
- Müsstler
- Colonel Jorgen (as Boris)
- Bianca Castafiore
- Igor Wagner
- Mrs. Finch
- Alfred Alembick
- Mrs. Piggott
- Sporovitch
- Captain Wizskitotz
- Trovik
- Sirov
- Zlop
- Lieutenant Kromir
- Major Szplodj
- Kaviarovitch
- Schzlozitch
- Czarlitz
- King Ottokar IV
- Colonel Sponsz (cameo)
- Studios Hergé members (cameo)

=== The Crab with the Golden Claws ===
- Tintin
- Snowy
- Captain Haddock (debut)
- Thomson and Thompson
- Omar Ben Salaad
- Allan
- Mrs. Finch
- Bunji Kuraki
- Jumbo
- Lieutenant Delcourt
- Herbert Dawes

=== The Shooting Star ===
- Tintin
- Snowy
- Captain Haddock
- Bohlwinkel
- Professor Phostle
- Professor Cantonneau
- Professor Philippulus
- Bill the cook
- Captain Chester
- Thomson and Thompson (cameo)
- Plane pilot

=== The Secret of the Unicorn ===
- Tintin
- Snowy
- Captain Haddock
- Thomson and Thompson
- Ivan Ivanovitch Sakharine
- Bird brothers
- Aristides Silk
- Barnaby
- Nestor
- Mrs. Finch
- Sir Francis Haddock
- Red Rackham
- Diego the Dreadful
- Studios Hergé members (cameo)

=== Red Rackham's Treasure ===
- Tintin
- Snowy
- Captain Haddock
- Professor Calculus (debut)
- Thomson and Thompson
- Bill the cook
- Ivan Ivanovitch Sakharine (cameo)

=== The Seven Crystal Balls ===
- Tintin
- Snowy
- Captain Haddock
- Professor Calculus
- Thomson and Thompson
- General Alcazar (as Ramón Zarate)
- Chiquito
- Sanders-Hardiman expedition members
- Professor Tarragon
- Professor Cantonneau
- Rascar Capac (preserved mummy)
- Bianca Castafiore
- Nestor
- Madame Yamilah
- Ragdalam the fakir
- Bruno the magician
- Inspector Chambers
- Inspector Jackson
- Studios Hergé members (cameo)

=== Prisoners of the Sun ===
- Tintin
- Snowy
- Captain Haddock
- Professor Calculus
- Thomson and Thompson
- Professor Cantonneau
- Chiquito
- Huascar
- Zorrino
- Prince of the Sun

=== Land of Black Gold ===
- Tintin
- Snowy
- Captain Haddock
- Thomson and Thompson
- Ben Kalish Ezab
- Abdullah
- Bab El Ehr
- Oliveira da Figueira
- Dr. Müller (as Professor Smith)
- Nestor (cameo)
- Professor Calculus (name mentioned)
- Bianca Castafiore (cameo)

=== Destination Moon ===
- Tintin
- Snowy
- Captain Haddock
- Professor Calculus
- Thomson and Thompson
- Mr. Baxter
- Frank Wolff
- Miller
- Colonel Jorgen
- Dr. Patella
- Nestor
- Studios Hergé members (cameo)

=== Explorers on the Moon ===
- Tintin
- Snowy
- Captain Haddock
- Professor Calculus
- Thomson and Thompson
- Mr. Baxter
- Frank Wolff
- Miller
- Colonel Jorgen
- Dr. Patella

=== The Calculus Affair ===
- Tintin
- Snowy
- Captain Haddock
- Professor Calculus
- Thomson and Thompson
- Bianca Castafiore
- Irma
- Igor Wagner
- Nestor
- Jolyon Wagg
- Cutts the butcher
- Alfredo Topolino
- Krônik and Klûmsi
- Colonel Sponsz
- Arturo Benedetto Giovanni Giuseppe Pietro Archangelo Alfredo Cartoffoli da Milano
- Marshal Kûrvi-Tasch
- Trickler (cameo)
- Studios Hergé members (cameo)

=== The Red Sea Sharks ===
- Tintin
- Snowy
- Captain Haddock
- General Alcazar
- Dawson (as Debrett)
- Ben Kalish Ezab
- Abdullah
- Bab El Ehr
- Oliveira da Figueira
- Piotr Skut
- Rastapopoulos (as Marquis di Gorgonzola)
- Dr. Müller (as Mull Pasha)
- Allan
- Bianca Castafiore
- Professor Calculus
- Thomson and Thompson
- Nestor
- Jolyon Wagg
- Studios Hergé members (cameo)

=== Tintin in Tibet ===
- Tintin
- Snowy
- Captain Haddock
- Tharkey
- Blessed Lightning
- Grand Abbot
- Chang Chong-Chen
- Professor Calculus
- The yeti
- Bianca Castafiore (cameo)

=== The Castafiore Emerald ===
- Tintin
- Snowy
- Captain Haddock
- Professor Calculus
- Thomson and Thompson
- Bianca Castafiore
- Irma
- Igor Wagner
- Nestor
- Mr. Bolt
- Cutts the butcher
- Jolyon Wagg
- Christopher Willoughby-Drupe and Marco Rizotto
- Unnamed magpie

=== Flight 714 to Sydney ===
- Tintin
- Snowy
- Captain Haddock
- Professor Calculus
- Laszlo Carreidas
- Piotr Skut
- Spalding
- Paolo Colombani
- Hans Boehm
- Dr. Krollspell
- Allan
- Rastapopoulos
- The Sondonesians
- Mik Kanrokitoff
- Gino
- Jolyon Wagg

=== Tintin and the Picaros ===
- Tintin
- Snowy
- Captain Haddock
- Professor Calculus
- Thomson and Thompson
- General Alcazar
- General Tapioca
- Colonel Alvarez
- The Picaros
- Pablo
- Bianca Castafiore
- Nestor
- Colonel Sponsz (as Colonel Esponja)
- Peggy Alcazar
- Jolyon Wagg
- Ridgewell
- The Arumbayas
- Cutts the butcher
- Christopher Willoughby-Drupe and Marco Rizotto (cameo)

=== Tintin and Alph-Art ===
- Tintin
- Snowy
- Captain Haddock
- Bianca Castafiore
- Endaddine Akass
- Martine Vandezande
- Ramó Nash
- Henri Fourcart
- Ben Kalish Ezab
- Abdullah
- Professor Calculus
- Thomson and Thompson
- Jolyon Wagg
- Irma
- Igor Wagner
- Nestor
- Cutts the butcher
- Ivan Ivanovitch Sakharine (cameo)
- Trickler (cameo)
- Gibbons (cameo)
- Dawson (cameo)

== Main characters ==
A panel from Red Rackham's Treasure, showing some of the main characters of The Adventures of Tintin. From left to right: Professor Calculus, Tintin, Captain Haddock, and Thomson and Thompson

== Antagonists ==
An edited panel from Flight 714 to Sydney, showing some of the antagonists of The Adventures of Tintin. From left to right: Hans Boehm and Spalding hold Captain Haddock and Tintin at gunpoint

=== Endaddine Akass ===
Endaddine Akass is a guru and main antagonist of the unfinished book Tintin and Alph-Art, the last of The Adventures of Tintin by Hergé. An odd-looking man with a large nose, long hair, beard, moustache, and large spectacles, Endaddine Akass holds a conference on "health and magnetism" for crowds of followers including Bianca Castafiore. Tintin recognises his voice. He could be Dr. Müller or Max Bird, but more than likely he is Rastapopoulos in disguise. His name, like many in the series, is based upon the Brussels patois marols.

In the two completed versions of Tintin and Alph-Art by Yves Rodier and a pseudonymous writer called Ramó Nash, Endaddine is indeed revealed to be Rastapopoulos. "You will never take me alive!" he says in the dramatic conclusion.

=== Colonel Alvarez ===
Colonel Alvarez is the polite aide-de-camp to General Tapioca who appears in Tintin and the Picaros. He is the one who receives Captain Haddock and Professor Calculus when they arrive in San Theodoros and takes them to their apartment. When he is first introduced in the adventure, he seems to be friendly and good-natured, which impresses the Captain. However, it is then revealed that Alvarez is a part of the plot orchestrated by Colonel Sponsz to eliminate Tintin, the Captain, and the Professor, and Alvarez is enraged when his men fail. When General Tapioca is overthrown, Alvarez shifts over to Alcazar's side, even expressing disappointment that Tapioca will not be executed. He then assists Tintin and the Captain in rescuing Thomson and Thompson and also freeing Bianca Castafiore and her entourage.

=== Bab El Ehr ===
Sheikh Bab El Ehr is an Arab insurgent who fights Emir Ben Kalish Ezab, ruler of the fictional Arabian state of Khemed; though overall he comes across as a villain rather than a noble fighter.

In Land of Black Gold, he is shown allied with Dr. Müller and his Skoil Petroleum Company and fighting a guerrilla war against Ben Kalish Ezab, the emir. Bab El Ehr's men mistake Tintin for a weapons smuggler working for the sheikh, and rescue him from Ben Kalish Ezab's soldiers. After discovering the mistake, Bab El Ehr accuses Tintin of being a spy for the emir and makes him a prisoner. Tintin collapses from thirst after a long march on foot through the desert, and is left behind by Bab El Ehr.

Bab El Ehr plays a major behind-the-scenes role in The Red Sea Sharks, having used Mosquito fighter planes provided by Mr. Dawson to carry out a successful coup d'état and overthrow the Emir. After Dawson discovers Tintin spying on his arms dealership, he warns Bab El Ehr, who puts out a reward for the capture of Tintin and Haddock. At the close of The Red Sea Sharks, Bab El Ehr's regime is declared over.

His name is derived from the Brussels dialect word babbelaar or "tattler".

=== Barnaby ===
(French: Barnabé)

Barnaby is the man hired by the antique dealers, the Bird brothers, to acquire the three parchments from the three model ships of the Unicorn—the first of which he finds in the Brussels Place du Jeu de Balle old market in The Secret of the Unicorn. When he failed his employers and Tintin purchased the ship instead, first he stole Tintin's Unicorn, then ransacked Tintin's flat after he broke the mast and did not find the parchment. Later, he chloroforms Ivan Ivanovitch Sakharine and breaks the mast of his ship, acquiring a parchment. When he brings it to the Bird brothers and then asks them for more money to get the other two, then threatens to expose them when they refuse, he is shot and wounded outside Tintin's flat. He turns from his employers and tries to warn Tintin of them but could only point to feeding birds.

In the motion capture film The Adventures of Tintin: The Secret of the Unicorn, Barnaby is an Interpol agent investigating Ivan Ivanovitch Sakharine. It was implied that he did not survive after being shot by Sakharine's accomplices.

=== Basil Bazarov ===
(French: Basil Bazaroff)

Basil Bazarov (formerly Mazarov in an early edition) of the Korrupt Arms Company (Vicking Arms Company in the French edition) is a German arms dealer who appears in The Broken Ear. He sells weapons to both sides of the conflict between San Theodoros and neighbouring Nuevo-Rico. He also works with his associate Mr. Trickler in an attempt to bring an end to their mutual enemy Tintin.

Hergé's Basil Bazarov was "characterised in every detail" by the real life Greek Vickers arms dealer Basil Zaharoff, who profited by selling weapons to both sides of the conflict between Bolivia and neighbouring Paraguay during the War of the Gran Chaco (in The Broken Ear, Bazarov fuels the "War of the Gran Chapo"). Sir Basil Zaharoff enjoyed a good reputation at the time The Broken Ear appeared; he was made a Grand-officier de la Légion d'honneur and made member of the Order of the British Empire.

=== Bird brothers ===
(French: Les frères Loiseau)

The Bird brothers, Max and G. Bird (French: Maxime et G. Loiseau) are the main adversaries in The Secret of the Unicorn. They are antique dealers who learn about a treasure left by the pirate Red Rackham, and are willing to kill in order to possess it.

In the original French, their names are Loiseau (French for "the bird"). Maxime is renamed Max in the English version. In the Golden Books edition (American English), their name is spelled Byrd.

The Bird brothers, like Tintin, are looking for the three parchments from Sir Francis Haddock that hold the secret of Red Rackham's Treasure. They operate from their manor, Marlinspike Hall, where at one point they hold Tintin prisoner to force him to surrender the parchments. Furthermore, they threaten him with torture while refusing to accept Tintin's explanation that a pickpocket had earlier stolen his wallet containing the parchments. Amongst their other crimes is the attempted murder of their helper, Barnaby, just before he can tell Tintin of their plot. The Bird brothers are eventually captured by Thomson and Thompson. Max escapes, but is later caught while trying to flee the country.

In Red Rackham's Treasure, Max Bird is said to have escaped again and is spotted near the Sirius, a ship about to set sail with Tintin and Haddock in their search for the treasure. Thomson and Thompson are thus sent as part of the expedition in order to look out for him, but he never appears. The detectives conclude at the end of the adventure that he was discouraged because of their presence.

At one point of the early development of what became Tintin in Tibet, Hergé originally considered bringing back the Bird brothers in a story in which they frame Nestor for a crime he did not commit. However, Hergé dismissed the idea.

The Bird brothers have not been seen since, though they were depicted in sketches for the unfinished Tintin and Alph-Art, in which they are at the inauguration of Ramó Nash's art exposition.

The Bird brothers appear in The Adventures of Tintin: The Secret of The Unicorn (Video Game Console Version). In the game, they are appear only in Marlinspike.

=== Hans Boehm ===
Hans Boehm, who appears briefly in Flight 714 to Sydney, is one of the pilots and hijackers of that flight. Rastapopoulos planned to eliminate him and the other conspirators.

=== Bohlwinkel ===
Mr. Bohlwinkel is a financier from the fictitious South American country São Rico, who appears in The Shooting Star. As the owner of a major banking concern and a petroleum firm called Golden Oil, he uses his wealth and resources to attempt to beat Tintin and his friends in the race to find a recently fallen meteorite. Apart from financing the exploratory vessel Peary, he unsuccessfully attempts to sabotage the competing expedition's ship Aurora, helmed by Captain Haddock. This includes depositing lit dynamite onto its deck (which Snowy puts out), instructing another ship under his control to ram the Aurora during a storm, refusing to allow the Aurora to refuel at a Golden Oil depot (only to have Haddock's old friend Captain Chester fuel the Aurora by siphoning oil being pumped into his tanks), and sending a fake S.O.S. to throw the Aurora off course (Tintin contacting multiple shipping agencies to determine that the ship and company that sent the distress call do not exist). The Shooting Star ends with a dismayed Bohlwinkel listening to a radio announcement that reveals that the police are onto him.

Bohlwinkel has physical traits reflecting a stereotypical Jew in Nazi propaganda. In the original edition of The Shooting Star published during World War II, he was named Blumenstein, an American Jew from a bank in New York. For the later edition of the book, Hergé altered the financier's antecedents by relocating him to the fictitious South American country São Rico and changing his name to a Brabantian dialect word for "sweet shop": bollewinkel, also modifying the spelling of the new name. After the edition was published, Hergé subsequently learnt that Bohlwinkel is a Jewish surname.

=== Al Capone ===
Al Capone is a Chicago crime boss and the main villain in Tintin in the Congo and Tintin in America. In Tintin in the Congo, he runs a criminal diamond smuggling operation, trying to gain control of the African diamond production. He orders thugs to face Tintin in Tintin in America. Capone's main rival in Chicago is Bobby Smiles.

Tintin arrests 355 members of Capone's Central Syndicate of Chicago Gangsters. Capone himself is tied up by Tintin and arrested, but he escapes.

The character is based on the real-life Al Capone of Chicago. Al Capone was alive in 1931 when Hergé depicted him in his comics. He would be the last real-life individual to appear as a character in the Adventures under their real name.

=== Pietro ===
Pietro is an Italian-American gangster in Tintin in America and one of Al Capone's fellow gangsters.

=== Chiquito ===
Chiquito, or Rupac Inca Huaco, is a full-blooded Peruvian Quechua and one of the last descendants of the Incas. He is first seen as the sidekick to General Alcazar in The Seven Crystal Balls and is ultimately seen as a leading member of the Incas in Prisoners of the Sun.

He assists General Alcazar in his knife-throwing act, but this serves as a cover since Chiquito, unknown to the General, is out to punish the Sanders-Hardiman expedition members who violated the tomb of his ancestors. He does so by breaking into the homes or offices of the explorers and breaking crystal balls in their presence. The balls contain a coca-derived drug that plunges them into a deep sleep.

One night, at the home of Calculus's friend Professor Tarragon, Chiquito breaks the final crystal ball in Tarragon's room after climbing down his chimney. He also seizes the jewellery of Rascar Capac, the Inca mummy whose tomb was violated by the expedition members. As he escapes, he is shot and wounded by a police officer and hides in a tree. In the morning, Calculus finds a bracelet that belonged to Rascar Capac and puts it on. He is promptly kidnapped by Chiquito and his men for sacrilege. To get past a roadblock, he and his accomplices switch cars. Chiquito takes the professor to Peru and Tintin and Captain Haddock go after them. He reappears in Prisoners of the Sun on the Pachacamac and catches Tintin who has swum aboard and found Calculus. When Chiquito calls for assistance, Tintin takes the opportunity to jump back into the water, swimming back to safety as Chiquito shoots at him. Their next meeting is at the Temple of the Sun, high in the mountains, where he and the Incas perform the ceremony of burning Tintin and his friends at the stake, only to be interrupted by a solar eclipse. He eventually releases his control over the Sanders-Hardiman expedition members by order of the Prince of the Sun.

=== Paolo Colombani ===
Paolo Colombani, is Skut's co-pilot and hijacker of that flight. Rastapopoulos planned to eliminate him and the other conspirators.

=== Dawson ===
Mr. J.M. Dawson is the corrupt British chief of police of the Shanghai International Settlement in The Blue Lotus. In revenge for Tintin's rebuking of his American friend, businessman Mr. Gibbons, Dawson has Sikh prison guards assault Tintin, but Tintin outwits them. Dawson then plots with Mr. Mitsuhirato and turns Tintin over to the Japanese, who have put a price on his head, calmly dismissing Tintin's protest that he is on neutral ground, as he did not have a passport to enter the Settlement to begin with. Dawson is ultimately forced to attend the ceremony in honour of Tintin.

Appearing in a more sinister role in The Red Sea Sharks, Dawson sells weapons to both General Alcazar and General Tapioca using the pseudonym Mr. Debrett (French: M. Dubreuil), and is being patronised by Rastapopoulos. He has Tintin and Captain Haddock denied entry to Khemed and plants a bomb on their return plane. Dawson's plan ultimately fails.

Although he does not reappear after this, Dawson is depicted in some sketches of the unfinished Tintin and Alph-Art, in which he is at the inauguration of Ramó Nash's art exposition.

In the animated series, Dawson's role is highly reduced. He speaks only briefly with first Mitsuhirato (by phone), and then Thomson and Thompson (in person). He does not appear to have anything more than an informal alliance with Mitsuhirato, as he only agrees to help arrest Tintin on trumped-up charges.

=== Corporal Diaz ===
(French: Caporal Diaz)

Corporal Diaz was a colonel for General Alcazar until Alcazar demoted him to corporal, replacing him with Tintin, after Diaz complained to the general that San Theodoros had too many colonels and too few corporals (The Broken Ear). In revenge, Diaz engaged in repeated, unsuccessful assassination attempts against Alcazar. Diaz expired in the last attempt when the bomb he planted exploded prematurely. Alcazar had just arrested and sentenced Tintin to death due to faked evidence, and had just promoted Corporal Diaz back to colonel.

=== The fakir ===
The fakir is the loincloth-wearing ascetic appearing in Cigars of the Pharaoh as a high-ranking member of an opium smuggling ring. He shoots darts soaked in the dangerous Rajaijah juice that drives people mad. Among his talents are hypnosis, the Indian rope trick, and escapology (to the point where he is offended by Tintin thinking he could tie him up). He is eventually captured when the leader accidentally knocks him out with a rock that had been intended for Tintin. When the Blue Lotus was originally published in black-and-white, the fakir tells his boss on the phone how he intends to bribe an asylum guard into arranging Tintin's "suicide". It is also later hinted that he is the chairman of the meeting of the hooded leaders of the drug cartel.

In the sequel The Blue Lotus, the fakir escapes from prison and again uses his darts to poison a Chinese man sent to warn Tintin against Mitsuhirato, another leader of the drug smugglers. In that title's original black-and-white version, the fakir can be seen escaping through the forest with his blowpipe after shooting the dart at the Chinese man. Not taking any chances, Tintin tells the Maharaja of Gaipajama he will not leave until he knows the fakir is unable to do him any harm. The next day they receive a telegram from the police announcing the fakir had been recaptured.

=== Gibbons ===
Mr. W.R. Gibbons is an American steel trader in The Blue Lotus. Gibbons is portrayed as an overweight, loud-mouthed, racist bigot. He is rude and abusive to a Chinese rickshaw driver, prompting Tintin to intercede. Gibbons also physically assaults a Chinese waiter at the "Occidental Private Club". He reports Tintin to the Japanese authorities in retaliation, only to be arrested as a liar when his information is found inaccurate. He is a friend of the Shanghai police chief Dawson who arranges for Gibbons to be released in return for expelling Tintin from the International Settlement into Japanese hands.

In the unfinished adventure Tintin and Alph-Art, Haddock and Tintin visit Bianca Castafiore at an island villa. There they meet a number of guests, including Mr. Gibbons; "He's in import-export", Castafiore says.

Not to be confused with another Gibbons, who is an American criminal worker affiliated with Al Capone and appears only in Tintin in the Congo.

=== The gunrunner ===
The gunrunner, who appears in Cigars of the Pharaoh, is an arms trafficker who rescues Tintin from a storm at sea, then turns him over to his enemies when Tintin discovers his weapons of contraband. After he and his men learn that Thomson and Thompson are about to board his ship, he escapes.

He is based on the real life French gunrunner Henry de Monfreid, a writer and adventurer whom Hergé initially admired. When Hergé learnt that Monfreid was providing guns for war, his attitude about him changed.

=== Huascar ===
Huascar, in Prisoners of the Sun, is one of the last descendants of the Incas, who worship the Sun in a hidden city in the mountains. Wearing a hat and poncho, Huascar watches Tintin and Captain Haddock when they arrive in Peru to rescue Professor Calculus. He listens in on their conversation with the chief of police and follows them through the streets of Callao.

At Santa-Clara, he arranges a train "accident" that nearly gets them killed by threatening a guard with the consequences of disobeying the orders of the Inca.

At Jauga, however, he sees Tintin defending a young orange seller named Zorrino from two white men. Surprised that a white foreigner such as Tintin should do such a selfless act, he advises him to stop searching for Calculus since he will be risking his life. Tintin states he will continue anyway, so Huascar gives him a talisman that he claims can keep danger away. Later captured by the Incas, Tintin gives the talisman to Zorrino. The Incas, who intend to kill them for treachery, see the talisman and spare the younger boy's life. Present at the scene, Huascar is revealed to be a High Priest of the Sun. He uses a large magnifying glass to set fire to the stake used to burn the westerners, but is thwarted by a solar eclipse that leads to their release.

Prisoners of the Sun, originally published in Tintin magazine with additional panels not included later in book form, included a scene with Huascar. In the magazine version, Tintin and Haddock are at the bridge waiting for an unknown guide when they meet Huascar, who tells them that their guide has gotten sick. He smiles at Haddock's insults and walks away. Zorrino then calls them over to the bridge. He claims that Huascar took him prisoner but that he escaped.

Huascar is not to be confused with the more ruthless Chiquito who bears a close resemblance to him.

=== Ivan ===
Ivan is a character who appears in The Black Island. He is a chauffeur and henchman of the villainous psychiatrist Dr. Müller, involved in counterfeit money trafficking. He is knocked out, tied and gagged by Tintin at the Black Island, but is later released by Puschov to plot against Tintin, then is finally taken into custody by the police.

=== Colonel Jorgen ===
Colonel Boris Jorgen is a sworn enemy of Tintin. They first meet in King Ottokar's Sceptre, where he is known as Colonel Boris and is a relatively minor character, supposedly in the service of King Muskar XII as his aide-de-camp. In fact, Jorgen is one of a number of Syldavian conspirators seeking to overthrow the king, in collaboration with the neighbouring republic of Borduria. As such, the colonel is in direct contact with the Central Committee of the revolutionary Iron Guard movement. Tintin delivers a humiliating knockout punch to him shortly before the Bordurian plot is foiled.

Colonel Jorgen returns in Destination Moon and confronts Tintin again in Explorers on the Moon, having stowed away on the Moon rocket that Tintin and his friends are piloting. Frank Wolff was told he would be a journalist; Jorgen reveals his true plan to steal the rocket when on the Moon. When most of the group leaves on the Moon-tank, Jorgen knocks Tintin out from behind, ties him up, and leaves him on a lower deck. He forces Wolff to help him maroon the others on the Moon, aware the rocket has oxygen for four people but there are seven on the ship. When the rocket does not launch, he accuses his engineer of letting himself be carried away by his scruples of conscience and prepares to shoot him, but is prevented from doing so by Tintin, who has severed the wires to the engine and holds Jorgen at gunpoint. Jorgen escapes custody during the return flight and attempts to kill the rocket crew. Wolff turns on Jorgen for this, and in the ensuing struggle, Jorgen is inadvertently shot, dying instantly. His body is subsequently ejected into space.

=== Jumbo ===
Jumbo is a henchman of Allan while aboard the Karaboudjan in The Crab with the Golden Claws. Allan asks him to watch for Tintin to return through a porthole window, while Tintin emerges instead from his hiding place under the bed. Allan returns to find him tied up with ropes.

Jumbo was a black African man in the original serialisations, but Hergé's American publishers objected to any depiction of the mixing of races. Hergé redrew Jumbo and another sailor as Arabs (and gave Jumbo a shirt) but kept the accompanying text intact, which resulted in Haddock continuing to refer to the Arab man as a "Negro".

=== Big Chief Keen-eyed-Mole ===
(French: Taupe-au-regard-perçant)

Big Chief Keen-eyed Mole is the sachem of the Blackfoot Native Americans in the United States and is convinced by crime boss Bobby Smiles that Tintin is attempting to steal their land. He addresses Tintin as "paleface" and plans to execute him using a tomahawk. Tintin then flicks resin at the chief, who believes that it was done by other members of the tribe using slingshots, and escapes while they all exchange blows. After coming around, Keen-eyed Mole realises that Tintin discovered the secret cave after Smiles speaks with him. He decides to leave the reporter in the hole, and is last seen being forced to leave by the military after an oil discovery in the area.

=== Dr. Krollspell ===
Dr. Krollspell is a German doctor and associate of Tintin's enemy Rastapopoulos in Flight 714 to Sydney, but he later changes sides when it is in his best interest to turn from his employer. Krollspell is an ex-Nazi scientist, probably based on Josef Mengele or Adolf Hitler's personal doctor, Theodor Morell. In an interview, Hergé suggested that Krollspell had worked in a concentration camp—Flight 714 to Sydney having been published some 20 years after the war. The name "Krollspell" is Brussels dialect for krulspeld, which means "hair curler".

Dr. Krollspell is the head of a psychiatric clinic in New Delhi (Cairo in the English version). He developed a truth serum that Rastapopoulos intends to use on kidnapped millionaire Laszlo Carreidas in order to learn where Carreidas had left a large part of his personal fortune. However, when Rastapopoulos was injected with the serum by accident and "confessed" that he planned to eliminate Krollspell, rather than pay him for his assistance, Krollspell joined forces with Tintin and his allies to try to escape from the island. Before the eruption of the volcano, Krollspell is taken away by the aliens along with Rastapopoulos and his gang. By the end of the adventure, a news programme announces that Krollspell was found near his clinic with no memory of how he got there.

Krollspell is depicted in some sketches of the unfinished Tintin and Alph-Art.

=== Krônik and Klûmsi ===
(French: Kronick et Himmerszeck)

Krônik and Klûmsi are inept Bordurian ZEP Secret Police agents ostensibly assigned by Colonel Sponsz to ensure Tintin and Captain Haddock's safety and well-being during their visit to the Bordurian capital Szohôd in The Calculus Affair. Their real objective is to prevent the two visitors from making indiscreet inquiries in their hunt for Professor Calculus. Tintin and Haddock neutralise the agents by plying them with drinks at dinner and then locking them in their respective hotel rooms. Their names are undoubtedly puns on "chronic" and "clumsy". They appear to be the Bordurian equivalents of Thomson and Thompson.

=== Marshal Kûrvi-Tasch ===
(French: Maréchal Plekszy-Gladz) Marshal Kûrvi-Tasch is the dictator of the fictional regime of Borduria. Although he never appears as a character in the series, he is mentioned by name and glimpsed in statues and portraits in The Calculus Affair and Tintin and the Picaros. His English name is an allusion to his curved moustache, which also appears as a stylised circumflex mark in the Bordurian language (an example can be seen in his name). Bordurians are often heard swearing "by the whiskers of Kûrvi-Tasch". The original French name plays on the word Plexiglas, the "artificial plasticity" of his character.

Kûrvi-Tasch's Bordurian government closely resembles the Nazi regime. The usage of the country's national insignia (naturally resembling the marshal's moustache) on badges and armbands is similar to the swastika. The greeting "Amaïh Kûrvi-Tasch" (meaning "Hail Kûrvi-Tasch") is similar to "Heil Hitler!"

=== Miller ===
Miller is the calculating spymaster from an unnamed power who masterminds a plot to hijack the Syldavian rocket programme in Destination Moon and Explorers on the Moon. He is the man who offered to help Frank Wolff out of his gambling debts in exchange for information on the rocket programme: Miller is shown in one panel checking a list of personnel at the Centre and finds Wolff's name among them.

Miller is first seen on the plane to Syldavia in Destination Moon. He is seated in the row ahead of Tintin and Captain Haddock and is astonished to hear the Captain mention the name "Calculus", showing that he was already planning to take over the Moon programme on which Calculus is working. He discreetly follows Tintin and Haddock through Klow airport but pulls back when he realises that they are being escorted by Zepo, the local secret police. With an associate known as the Baron, he then sets about parachuting agents into the area of the Centre to obtain the plans for the experimental uncrewed rocket X-FLR6. When X-FLR6 is launched, Miller's technicians are able to intercept it and divert the rocket to their own territory. However, Tintin and Calculus had expected this and destroy the rocket before it can land. Miller threatens to have Wolff killed, as he suspects him of double-crossing him, but refrains when it is announced that a crewed rocket would go to the Moon. Miller arranges for Colonel Jorgen, an old enemy of Tintin's, to be smuggled aboard. Ultimately, his attempt to control the rocket fails, his agents Jorgen and Wolff both perishing in the process. Miller is last seen cursing the rocket's crew and his agents' bungling, wishing that they would all perish in the last stage of the return journey.

Like any good spymaster, Miller designated various code names to his targets and operations: The centre is referred to as the "Main Workshop"; Calculus and Haddock are "Mammoth" and "Whale"; and the operation to hijack the crewed rocket to the Moon is called "Ulysses" — after the Greek hero who also goes on an epic journey and is a master of intrigue and deception as well.

=== Mitsuhirato ===
Mitsuhirato is a Japanese double agent who appears in The Blue Lotus. He owns a women's clothing shop on the Street of Tranquility in Shanghai and appears friendly to Tintin, but Mitsuhirato also plots with Dawson and is involved in a drug trafficking cabal with Rastapopoulos while working for the Japanese government. Mitsuhirato is characterised as an evil, scheming person, exploiting political turmoil in China to his and his country's advantage. He is depicted as unscrupulous and militaristic, with stereotypically rectangular teeth. After his subsequent capture at the end of The Blue Lotus, he committed suicide by hara-kiri.

=== Dr. Müller ===
(French: Docteur Müller)

Dr. J. W. Müller is the evil German psychiatrist whose position and qualifications serve as a cover for more villainous activities, including mistreatment of patients, counterfeiting, and later criminal mercenary. Hergé considered Müller "a Rastapopoulos-figure prepared to risk his own life." Müller frequently uses profanities such as "Kruzitürken" that are of Bavarian origin, suggesting his background to be Bavarian or Austrian, but he could also be Swiss or South-Tirolian. As with Rastapopoulos, his true nationality is never revealed.

Müller's first appearance is in The Black Island where he is in league with British counterfeiters. He tries to send Tintin to his psychiatric clinic, but Tintin defeats him and Müller accidentally burns his own house. He and his henchman Ivan manage to recover some of the counterfeit money and fly away to the Black Island. Once there, Tintin knocks out and gags Müller, but he is subsequently released by his employer Puschov and the other members of the counterfeit gang. Müller is ultimately taken into custody.

Dr. Müller also appears in Land of Black Gold and The Red Sea Sharks. In both, he helps the rebel Bab El Ehr in his attempts to overthrow the Emir, Ben Kalish Ezab. He designed Formula Fourteen, which increased the explosive properties of petrol, and sabotaged the pipelines of Arabex, the Emir's preferred petrol company. While in his initial appearance, he wore a goatee and moustache and had a plump physique, in later appearances, he wears a full-grown beard and is leaner, enabling him to pose as an Arab. In The Red Sea Sharks, he had changed his name to Mull Pasha (French: Müll Pacha) (shown in the pile of newspaper clippings near the end of the adventure), a clear reference to Glubb Pasha, the idiosyncratic British commander of the Arab legion who operated out of Jordan during the Second World War. Once Bab el Ehr is overthrown, Dr. Müller is also captured.

Dr. Müller is based on Dr. Georg Bell, a Nazi counterfeiter of Scottish descent whom Hergé had learnt about from the February 1934 issue of Le Crapouillot, a source of information for him at the time. Dr. Bell was linked to the Nazi party at its highest levels and was involved in a plot to destabilise Soviet Russia through counterfeiting Russian roubles.

=== Müsstler ===
Müsstler is the unseen powerful despot in King Ottokar's Sceptre; a Syldavian political agitator and leader of the "Iron Guard", cover for the ZZRK (Syldavian Central Revolutionary Committee). He plots the deposition of the Syldavian king and the annexation of the country by Borduria.

Hergé arrived at the character's name by combining the surnames of Italy's National Fascist leader Benito Mussolini and Nazi leader Adolf Hitler. Müsstler's group, the Iron Guard, is named after a Romanian fascist group. Bordurian officers wear uniforms based on those of the German SS. Literary critic Jean-Marie Apostolidès of Stanford University asserted that the inclusion of the Iron Guard evoked Colonel François de La Rocque's Croix-de-Feu, noting that the figure of Müsstler was "the Evil One without a face".

=== Omar Ben Salaad ===
Omar Ben Salaad is a wealthy Arab merchant based in the fictional port city of Bagghar in French Morocco, who appears in The Crab with the Golden Claws. A shopkeeper claims he is the wealthiest man in Bagghar. He is seen to own a palace with servants, horses, cars, huge amounts of land, and a plane.

Tintin, however, discovers him to be behind an opium trafficking ring, which uses tins of crab to smuggle the drug. When Tintin was captured early in the adventure, it was Salaad who wired the initial order to have Tintin thrown overboard, but Tintin's escape prevented it. Later, Tintin discovers the base where the opium is stored is in Salaad's cellar, with an entrance behind a bookcase. Salaad tries to shoot Tintin but is knocked out when Snowy bites him, causing him to shoot a chandelier onto himself, and is arrested. It is later revealed that his activities went all the way to the Far East.

Omar Ben Salaad's city Bagghar sounds like bagarre, the French word for "fight" or "brawl". "Omar" is a common Arabic name, but Omar Salaad also sounds like homard salade ("lobster salad").

Omar Ben Salaad is portrayed by Gad Elmaleh in the motion capture film The Adventures of Tintin: The Secret of the Unicorn; however, in the film he has no part in any conspiracy, merely owning a palace at which Bianca Castafiore performs.

=== Pablo ===
Pablo is a native of San Theodoros and lives in the capital Los Dopicos. His first appearance is in The Broken Ear, in which oil oligarch Mr. Trickler hires him to bring an end to Tintin. Pablo's attempt fails; Tintin captures Pablo, who begs for mercy, and Tintin lets him go. Trickler then frames Tintin for espionage and the young man is soon sentenced to death. In return for Tintin's mercy, Pablo assembles a gang of men, breaks into the prison, and frees Tintin and Snowy. In the 1935 serialised version, Pablo's full name was given as Juan Paolino, the Terror of Los Dopicos and best shooter in the country.

Pablo returned in Tintin and the Picaros, where he appeared to help Tintin and his friends escape their current captivity, but really putting them in a position where they could be shot while trying to escape. When Tintin discovered his treachery, he allowed Pablo to go free, as he remembered Pablo once saved his life.

=== Alonso Pérez and Ramón Bada ===
(French: Alonzo Perez et Ramon Bada)

Alonso Pérez and Ramón Bada are the chief antagonists in The Broken Ear. They discover that a diamond is being concealed in a Native South American fetish and do anything to possess it. Pérez, an engineer, is the leader of the two. Bada, the follower, is a knife thrower, and uses more Spanish in his speech than Pérez. The two villains and Tintin follow the artifact through the Republic of San Theodoros, with all three being drafted into the Republic's army during the Gran Chapo War with Nuevo Rico over oil rights. While fighting with Tintin in hand-to-hand combat on an ocean liner, Ramón and Alonso fall into the sea, clutching each other's throats as each man believes he is strangling Tintin, and drown. They are last seen being taken to Hell by smiling winged demons.

=== Puschov ===
(French: Wronzoff)

Puschov is leader of the international gang of banknote counterfeiters in The Black Island, handler of Ranko the gorilla and superior to Dr. Müller. He is a cunning and deceptive figure, framing Tintin for the assault on the train, tricking Tintin when he "returns from the dead" (he falls on his knees and begs the "ghost" for mercy, only to trip him and acquire his gun). He wields Ranko against his pursuers. He is handcuffed by Tintin, but he manages to escape and release the other members of the counterfeit gang. He and his allies are ultimately taken into custody.

=== Ranko ===
Ranko is a gorilla who is used by Puschov, employer of Dr. Müller, to frighten inquisitive intruders away from The Black Island, where forgers are printing counterfeit banknotes off the Scottish coast. At first, Ranko seems very fierce and bloodthirsty, but he is easily controlled by Snowy's barking, which terrifies him. He develops an affection for Tintin after receiving first aid from him for a broken arm. After the events of The Black Island, a newspaper clipping reports Ranko will live in a Glasgow zoo.

=== Rascar Capac ===
Rascar Capac is the Incan mummy in The Seven Crystal Balls. He is an ancient Incan monarch dug up by the Sanders-Hardiman expedition members. Professor Tarragon displays the mummy in his home. When lightning strikes into the chimney, it sends a fireball hurtling through the living room and into Rascar Capac, vaporizing him. That night, Tintin, Captain Haddock, and Professor Calculus all have the same nightmare: Rascar Capac climbs into the room carrying a crystal ball and smashes it onto the floor. The mummy is not seen again.

=== Red Rackham ===
(French: Rackham le Rouge)

Red Rackham is the pirate who attacks the Unicorn, the ship captained by Sir Francis Haddock (Captain Haddock's ancestor). Rackham engages Haddock in battle, resulting in the almost total destruction of Rackham's ship. As his ship is sinking, Rackham and his men board the Unicorn and manage to gain control of the vessel. Haddock is captured and tied to the ship's mast and the crew is cast overboard. Rackham intends to have Haddock tortured by his men the following day to avenge his dead crew members, but before he can, Haddock frees himself and they engage in single combat using cutlasses. Rackham is killed in the duel and Sir Francis manages to destroy the Unicorn and escape.

The character Red Rackham was based on the Golden Age of Piracy pirates John Rackham, Blackbeard, and Montbars the Exterminator.

In the motion capture film The Adventures of Tintin: The Secret of the Unicorn, it is revealed that Red Rackham is the ancestor of Ivan Ivanovitch Sakharine. Red Rackham is portrayed by Daniel Craig (who also portrays Sakharine).

=== Bobby Smiles ===
Bobby Smiles is a Chicago crime boss whose rival is Al Capone (Tintin in America). He begins by offering Tintin a salary to join him against his rival. After Tintin refuses, Smiles kidnaps him and orders his gangsters to drop him into Lake Michigan, where Tintin outwits them. Smiles flees to the fictional Redskin City, where he manages to convince the Native Americans to turn against Tintin. He is eventually arrested, delivered to Chicago police headquarters, and brought to justice.

In the animated series, Smiles works for Capone, rather than against him.

=== The Sondonesians ===
(French: Les Sondonésiens)

The Sondonesians are the fictional Southeast Asian people who appear in Flight 714 to Sydney.

Rastapopoulos hires the Sondonesians as mercenaries to collaborate in his scheme to steal the fortune of Laszlo Carreidas, explaining that he will help them in their war for independence. They assist in capturing Carreidas' plane and diverting it to an Indonesian island, keeping the passengers and pilot imprisoned in old Japanese WWII bunkers. Rastapopoulos has mined the Sondonesians' junks so that they will be eliminated.

When Allan corners Tintin and his entourage in a cave, the Sondonesians refuse to enter, pointing to signs the gods have left on the cave threatening punishment for anyone who enters. In fact, these "gods" are extraterrestrials who have been visiting the island for years, and a landing of theirs had occurred just the previous night, as signified by strange lights in the sky that frightened the Sondonesians. When the main characters meet Mik Kanrokitoff, he explains that he has hypnotised and freed the Sondonesian guards (whom Tintin and Captain Haddock had bound and gagged) and let them spread fear among their compatriots. When an earthquake occurs shortly afterwards, the Sondonesians' nerves are finally stressed beyond their breaking point. Allan frantically attempts to stop them, but they assault him and flee the island.

Hergé depicts the Sondonesians using the real Indonesian language. While on duty, two of Tintin's captors talk about a particular Indonesian dish that originated in Java: sambal ulek (ground chili sauce with shrimp paste).

=== Spalding ===
Spalding appears in Flight 714 to Sydney; he is the British secretary for millionaire Laszlo Carreidas and is one of the hijackers of that flight. Captain Haddock mistakes him for Carreidas when they first meet. Rastapopoulos planned to eliminate him and the other conspirators. He is finally seen being abducted by the aliens and brought to an unknown fate.

In an interview with the Sunday Times in 1968, Hergé is quoted as saying that Spalding was "a British public school man, obviously the black sheep of his family". Spalding has a formal manner, stiff upper lip, and fashionable clothes.

=== Colonel Sponsz ===
Colonel Sponsz is the monocle-wearing military official and Chief of Police of the Bordurian capital Szohôd, as well as head of the ZEP Secret Police, which operates on behalf of the country's dictator Marshal Kûrvi-Tasch. He first appears in The Calculus Affair; he is the mastermind behind the kidnapping of Professor Calculus by ZEP to force Calculus to use his research on ultrasonic waves to create a weapon of mass destruction. He also arranges for Tintin and Captain Haddock, who are attempting to rescue Calculus, to be shadowed by ZEP agents Krônik and Klûmsi, who pose as translators. After Tintin and Haddock escape from Krônik and Klûmsi and hide in the Opera, Sponsz orders the police to surround the Opera while going to hear Bianca Castafiore sing. Unbeknownst to Sponsz, Tintin and Haddock are hiding in Castafiore's closet when Sponsz visits her in her dressing room. The two protagonists thus hear the entirety of the Bordurian plan for Calculus. Tintin and Haddock also manage to steal passes for two Red Cross representatives and a release order for Calculus from Sponsz's coat; they use these and some disguises obtained from the Opera to sneak Calculus out of the fortress of Bakhine, into neighbouring Syldavia, and home.

Sponsz reappears in Tintin and the Picaros. In this adventure, he has been assigned by Marshal Kûrvi-Tasch as a technical adviser to General Tapioca, the new ruler of San Theodoros, and is tasked with reorganising the Secret Police there. In San Theodoros, he takes the Spanish spelling of his name, Esponja, and grows a beard. Sponsz plants false documents in Bianca Castafiore's luggage, which provides "proof" of a conspiracy led by her against General Tapioca, justifying the arrest of Castafiore. Sponsz later arrests Thomson and Thompson as well. Humiliated by Tintin in The Calculus Affair, Colonel Sponsz aims for the entrapment and capture of Tintin and Captain Haddock, whom he knows will come to the rescue of Castafiore. He then uses Pablo, Tintin's ally in The Broken Ear but now a double agent for Tapioca in the camp of General Alcazar and the Picaros, to set up a second trap for Tintin, Haddock, Calculus, and General Alcazar. Sponsz appears again in the end of the adventure, as he is captured by the Picaros along with General Tapioca and is exiled and sent back to Borduria as punishment for his crimes.

Hergé used his own brother, Paul Remi, as the model for Sponsz, although he was also influenced by the image of the Austrian American filmmaker Erich von Stroheim.

=== Mr. and Mrs. Snowball ===
Mr. and Mrs. Snowball are members of the secret Kih-Oskh organization, a gang of international opium-smugglers in Cigars of the Pharaoh. They wear hooded garments and meet in a secret hiding-place of the organization. During the evening-party at the Major's country house, Mrs. Snowball faints, thinking she saw a ghost. But it is actually Sophocles Sarcophagus, wrapped in a white sheet. They are tied up, knocked unconscious, unmasked, and turned over to the authorities by the end of the adventure.

=== General Tapioca ===
General Tapioca is the arch-rival of General Alcazar. Tapioca and Alcazar are both generals in their armies in the banana republic of San Theodoros during The Broken Ear. He and Alcazar depose each other and assume dictatorial leadership of the country with comedic frequency.

In The Seven Crystal Balls, Tapioca has exiled Alcazar from San Theodoros, taking his role as the dictator of the country. By The Red Sea Sharks, Dawson is selling planes to Tapioca and to Alcazar. At the end of the adventure, a newspaper clipping reports that Alcazar has again ousted Tapioca.

In Tintin and the Picaros, Tapioca appears in person for the first time. He is now being helped by Colonel Sponsz of Borduria, an old foe of Tintin and Captain Haddock, who was assigned by Marshal Kûrvi-Tasch to San Theodoros and serve as Tapioca's technical adviser. General Tapioca's regime is overthrown by Alcazar with the help of Tintin and Captain Haddock. Although Tapioca approves of Alcazar's plan to execute him, he and Alcazar begrudgingly submit to Tintin's petition to spare him, and as such, he is offered transport out of the country.

=== Allan Thompson ===
Allan Thompson, commonly Allan, is a British-American criminal henchman and merchant seaman, often involved in smuggling and other criminal activities. His complete name is Allan Thompson in the original French, but English translations leave out his surname to avoid confusion with the detectives Thomson and Thompson.

Originally, Allan was the treacherous first mate of Captain Haddock in The Crab with the Golden Claws, keeping him drunk and running the ship to smuggle opium, Allan takes orders from Omar Ben Salaad. He appears retroactively when Hergé redrew the earlier adventure Cigars of the Pharaoh, as he was not in the original. The following year, Hergé featured him in The Red Sea Sharks in league with Rastapopoulos, where his ship is used in slave trading. In Flight 714 to Sydney, he is Rastapopoulos' main accomplice. He is shown savagely beaten after escaping the Sondonesians, causing him to suffer a loss of his teeth (the original French version specifies that he lost his dentures, suggesting that he had no real teeth to begin with). He escapes a volcanic eruption and flees in a rubber raft with the other criminals, but he and his accomplices are hypnotised and compelled to board a spaceship, whisking them away to an unknown fate.

Also, he neither appeared in Tintin and Alph-Art, nor was he supposed to appear, but in Rodier's version of Tintin and Alph-Art, Allan quit his life as a mariner and became a mailman in the mainland United States. At some point, Rastapopoulos attempted to reach out to Allan and offer him a job, but Allan refused to return to the criminal empire. In another completed version of that unfinished comic by a writer using the pseudonym Ramó Nash, Allan is again portrayed as an associate of Rastapopoulos.

Allan is portrayed by Daniel Mays in the motion capture film The Adventures of Tintin: The Secret of the Unicorn.

=== Trickler ===
(French: Chicklet)

Mr. R.W. Trickler is an unscrupulous American businessman in The Broken Ear who represents General American Oil in the South American republic of San Theodoros. Trickler attempts to engineer a war in order for San Theodoros to seize total control of the supposedly oil-rich Gran Chapo region from neighbouring Nuevo-Rico and hand it over to his company. He further seeks to profit even more through the sale of arms by his associate Basil Bazarov to both countries.

Trickler tries unsuccessfully to bribe Tintin into convincing General Alcazar to start a war against Nuevo-Rico. When that fails, he tries to have Tintin assassinated and bribes Alcazar in person, then has Tintin framed as a spy and nearly executed. At the end of the adventure, it turns out the Gran Chapo region has no trace of oil.

He appears anonymously in The Calculus Affair (page 47), staying in hotel Zsnorr; presumably he is in arms traffic.

In the unfinished adventure Tintin and Alph-Art, Haddock and Tintin visit Bianca Castafiore at an island villa. There they meet a number of guests, including Mr. Trickler; "Director of an important oil company", Castafiore says.

=== Tom ===
Tom is working with Al Capone to kill Tintin in Tintin in the Congo. He is later eaten by crocodiles. Tintin then impersonates him to catch Gibbons.

=== Unnamed magpie ===
An unnamed magpie is the main "antagonist" and first character seen (page 1, frame 1) in The Castafiore Emerald, Hergé's third-last adventure. Magpies are known for stealing shiny things and keeping them in their nests for decoration, and this magpie stole various items such as Irma's precious golden scissors and Bianca Castafiore's emerald given to her by the Maharaja of Gaipajama.

Tintin expert Michael Farr pointed out, "Even The Castafiore Emerald has a culpable magpie."

In the end, Tintin solves the mystery of who took the emerald, but after Castafiore had left. So, he gave it to Thomson and Thompson. Later, it is seen that Thompson and Thomson have lost the emerald.

== Supporting characters ==
A panel from The Castafiore Emerald, showing some of the supporting characters of The Adventures of Tintin. From left to right: Irma and Igor Wagner are introduced by Bianca Castafiore to Captain Haddock and Tintin

=== Abdullah ===
(French: Abdallah)

Abdullah is the spoiled, mischievous young prince of the fictional Arabian state of Khemed, whose father is Ben Kalish Ezab, the Emir. He first appears in Land of Black Gold, then in The Red Sea Sharks when the Emir entrusts his son to Tintin's care. Prince Abdullah is based on the young King Faisal II of Iraq.

Abdullah is a serial practical joker whose favourite victim is the short-tempered Captain Haddock (whom he persistently misnames as "Blistering Barnacles"). He is doted upon by his father. Abdullah has a tendency to dislike people and promise punishments from his father to everyone who annoys him, even as he is playing pranks on them. Despite his continued persecution of Haddock, he also becomes extremely fond of the Captain in his own way, finding the latter's tantrums and general behaviour hilarious.

=== General Ramon Alcazar ===
(French: Général Ramon Alcazar)

General Ramon Alcazar is a friend of Tintin and is the occasional dictator of the fictional banana republic of San Theodoros. He is involved in a never-ending struggle for power with his archrival, General Tapioca. Both men claim leadership of the country and rename its capital after themselves upon arriving in power. Alcazar controls the Presidential Palace of Los Dopicos in "The Broken Ear," where he makes Tintin his aide-de-camp before ordering Tintin's arrest after being persuaded by Mr. Trickler. By the time of "The Seven Crystal Balls," Alcazar has lost power, becoming a cabaret act in Europe: a skilled knife thrower under the stage name Ramón Zarate. In "The Red Sea Sharks," Alcazar is discovered to be buying weapons from Dawson in an illegal arms deal. Finally, in "Tintin and the Picaros," Alcazar has returned to his country and is finding it difficult to lead the Picaros on a guerrilla operation in the tropical forest while married to a harridan named Peggy who bullies him. Tintin, though uninterested in his cause, devises a stratagem to return him to power in order to rescue his friends: Alcazar drives a tourist bus through the carnival, infiltrates the palace, confronts Tapioca, and carries out a coup d'état. He is once again in charge of San Theodoros, but it is suggested his rule is no different from his rival's. Although his forename is not specified in the books, Herge's manuscripts state it is Ramon.

=== Peggy Alcazar ===
Peggy Alcazar is a harridan married to General Alcazar in Tintin and the Picaros. Appearing first in hair curlers and later with a high ponytail, she psychologically dominates General Alcazar and makes him do the housework.

Hergé based her appearance on a female Ku-Klux-Klan member he saw while watching a TV news report in the 1960s. Additionally, in an early draft, Peggy was stated to be the daughter of Basil Bazarov and on the board of supervisors for his company. The General marrying her allows him access to her family's wealth and a large amount of weaponry. This backstory did not arrive in the final version.

=== Professor Alembick ===
(French: Professeur Nestor Halambique)

Professor Hector Alembick is a sigillographer: an expert on seals used to authenticate state documents. He appears as a bespectacled, chain-smoking academic in King Ottokar's Sceptre when Tintin meets him when returning a briefcase the professor had left on a park bench. Professor Alembick tells Tintin of his desire to visit Syldavia to research an ancient seal belonging to the Syldavian monarch King Ottokar IV. Tintin offers to be Alembick's secretary on his journey. On the day before the trip, Alembick calls Tintin by telephone; in the midst of the conversation Tintin hears a struggle and a cry for help before the connection is cut short. When Tintin rushes to the professor's apartment to investigate, he is startled to find the professor calmly packing his bags. Although Alembick's appearance seems unchanged, subtle changes in his behaviour, such as no longer requiring cigarettes or eyeglasses, lead Tintin to suspect that something is amiss. At the end of the adventure, Tintin discovers that Professor Hector Alembick had indeed been kidnapped and impersonated by his twin brother Alfred.

Professor Alembick's name is a pun on alembic, an alchemical still.

=== The Arumbayas ===
The Arumbayas are an indigenous people living in the South American rainforest along the fictional river Coliflor. They first appear in The Broken Ear where, investigating the theft of an Arumbaya fetish with a broken ear, Tintin and Snowy venture into the San Theodoros jungle. The British explorer Ridgewell lives with them. Despite a reputation for ferocity, the Arumbayas prove to be relatively civil when Tintin encounters them. They casually explain that their bad reputation may be due to the actions of their neighbours, the Rumbabas, who behead anyone who passes their way. The Arumbayas also appear in Tintin and the Picaros.

=== Mr. Baxter ===
Mr. Baxter is the director general of the Sprodj Atomic Research Centre, appearing in Destination Moon and Explorers on the Moon. He is humble, refusing to go to the Moon in Captain Haddock's place when it is offered to him, and he works well with Professor Calculus, whom he supports completely. He misses most of the excitement of the Moon journey, having to stay and man the centre, but acquires some of it when the returning Moon rocket nearly lands on his car.

=== Ben Kalish Ezab ===
Mohammed Ben Kalish Ezab is the emir of the fictional Arabian state of Khemed. His son is the spoiled prince Abdullah. After first appearing in Land of Black Gold, the Emir reappears in The Red Sea Sharks when he has been temporarily overthrown by his rival, Sheikh Bab El Ehr. Ben Kalish Ezab then appears in Tintin and Alph-Art, announcing during a television interview that he will build a museum of art in Wadesdah.

Ben Kalish Ezab is depicted as kind and jovial to his friends while vicious and cruel to his enemies. On one occasion, Dr. Müller attempted suicide rather than be handed over to him. More than anything else, he dotes on his son Abdullah.

Kalish Ezab is a wordplay; in Brussels dialect, kalisjensap means "liquorice juice".

=== Bill the cook ===
(French: Van Damme)

Bill, a ship's cook, is the cook on board the Aurora during The Shooting Star. He then returned as cook on board the Sirius during Red Rackham's Treasure and was the first character seen in that adventure, meeting a friend at a pub before sailing. His indiscreet talk of treasure hunting was overheard by a newspaper reporter, which, after that story was published, caused Tintin and Captain Haddock to be besieged with more newspaper reporters. Bill was beleaguered by both Snowy and Professor Calculus, the former who stole a chicken and the latter who stole a box of biscuits.

=== Blessed Lightning ===
Blessed Lightning is a Tibetan Buddhist monk with psychic powers. He occasionally goes into a trance, floats into the air, and is able to see events from the future. In Tintin in Tibet, he foresees Snowy's journey to bring the monks a distress message from Tintin, leading to Tintin's rescue.

=== Mr. Bolt ===
(French: Isidore Boullu)

Mr. Arthur Bolt is a stonemason who appears in The Castafiore Emerald, hired by Captain Haddock to fix the broken step in Marlinspike Hall, but who repeatedly fails to arrive and instead offers a continuous sequence of excuses. Later, Mr. Bolt is one of the people who send the Captain a telegram when his engagement to marry Bianca Castafiore is erroneously announced. He is also a member of the band that plays outside Marlinspike as part of the "celebrations". At the end of the adventure, Mr. Bolt finally arrives to fix the broken step, but it is immediately broken again. By the time of Tintin and the Picaros, Mr. Bolt appears to have finally fixed the step.

=== Professor Cantonneau ===
Paul Cantonneau is a professor of the university of Paris. He appears in three books. In the Shooting Star, he is one of the professors, gets seasick, and is assaulted by the crazy Phillipus the prophet. He returns in The Seven Crystal Balls. He is knocked into a coma while he is on the phone with Tintin. In Prisoners of the Sun, he is shown waking up. He is unconscious at one point in every book he appears in.

=== Laszlo Carreidas ===
Laszlo Carreidas, a wealthy aircraft manufacturer tycoon, becomes embroiled in the adventure Flight 714 to Sydney. While Tintin and his friends are travelling in Indonesia on their way to Sydney, Captain Haddock mistakes Carreidas sitting in the Jakarta airport for a tramp. Meanwhile, the criminal mastermind Rastapopoulos kidnaps Carreidas to take his Swiss fortune. He is drugged by Dr. Krollspell to reveal his Swiss bank account number, rescued then bound by Tintin and Captain Haddock and marched as a hostage, and hypnotised by Mik Kanrokitoff to think that he still wears his hat. Kanrokitoff hypnotises him again and leaves him with the others in the motorboat, and later, Carreidas is on the flight to Sydney with Tintin and his friends.

His unassuming figure notwithstanding, Carreidas is revealed to be a cunning individual with a long history of unscrupulous behaviour not limited to the business world; he is not above cheating Captain Haddock at a game of Battleships with the help of closed-circuit television. An aircraft industrialist, Laszlo Carreidas naturally travels in a prototype supersonic business jet, the Carreidas 160. Despite the caution he appears to take with his money, refusing to pay any ransom and keeping his accounts secret, Carreidas generally appears to have a random attitude about his finances, ordering the purchase of multiple paintings simply because a rival ("Onassis") is after them, and appearing more concerned about the loss of a rare hat ("a pre-war Bross & Clackwell") than the loss of his prototype aeroplane.

Carreidas' name is a pun: carré d'as means "four aces" in French. Accordingly, the logo on the tail of his business jet consists of four aces. Hergé based Carreidas on Marcel Dassault, the French aircraft industrialist, who possessed a similar combination of wealth, aeronautical engineering genius, and quaint notions of fashion (Dassault's wardrobe remained frozen in the mid-1930s).

Carreidas is depicted in some sketches of the unfinished Tintin and Alph-Art, in which he is seen at the inauguration of Ramó Nash's art exposition.

=== Captain Chester ===
Captain Chester, an old friend of Captain Haddock, is a gruff merchant skipper with red hair and a bushy red moustache. He first appears in The Shooting Star in Iceland, where he bumps into Captain Haddock at the docks and launches into a bizarre greeting ritual with Haddock that Tintin at first interprets as the build-up to a fight. However, Haddock and Chester warmly clasp hands and take Tintin to a local bar to reminisce over a bottle of whisky. Chester is captain of the Sirius, a merchant trawler, and uses it to secretly refuel Haddock's research vessel in Iceland when their competitors block the supply, allowing his friend to continue his voyage.

Chester later lends the Sirius to Haddock when he and Tintin set off to find Red Rackham's Treasure. Chester is briefly mentioned in The Seven Crystal Balls—Tintin and Haddock attempt to visit him while he is docked at a port—but he departs before they arrive. He is one of the people to send Haddock a telegram in The Castafiore Emerald.

=== Coco ===
Coco is a Congolese boy who is Tintin's assistant in Tintin in the Congo. He speaks in an old-fashioned pidgin dialect. Fiercely loyal, he is the one person whom Tintin can fully rely on during his travels there.

=== Cutts the butcher ===
(French: Boucherie Sanzot)

Cutts the butcher runs the local butcher's shop whose phone number of 431 is frequently mistaken for 421 to Marlinspike Hall. As a result, the mansion's inhabitants are endlessly plagued by orders for lamb chops and sausages. The irony is that when making calls himself, Captain Haddock usually ends up getting put through to Cutts' shop, rather than the place he was actually calling.

The unseen delivery man from Cutts' butcher shop plays a vital role in The Calculus Affair by offering Professor Calculus a lift to the village just in time to save him from a Bordurian kidnapping attempt.

It would appear that Cutts is also the local mayor, since he can be seen dressed very formally along with the local municipal band congratulating Haddock and Bianca Castafiore on their "engagement" in The Castafiore Emerald. He had one last reference at the start of Tintin and Alph-Art, where a call for him was made.

In the original French, the name of the butcher's shop Boucherie Sanzot is a pun. Sanzot sounds like sans os, which means "without bones". The English translation uses Cutts to make a different pun. Cutts also appeared in a French TV ad for cooking oil with Professor Calculus in 1979.

=== Lieutenant Delcourt ===
Lieutenant Delcourt is a French officer of the Méharistes (desert camel corps), who appears in The Crab with the Golden Claws. He is in command of the outpost of Afghar, in the Sahara desert. He assists Tintin and Captain Haddock on their way to find the missing freighter Karaboudjan.

=== Christopher Willoughby-Drupe and Marco Rizotto ===
(French: Jean-Loup de la Battellerie et Walter Rizotto)

Christopher Willoughby-Drupe and Marco Rizotto are a writer and photographer working for the magazine Paris Flash. They first appear in The Castafiore Emerald where, to the fury of Captain Haddock and the amusement of Bianca Castafiore, they write a sensational article for their magazine announcing that the Captain and the Diva are engaged. They later appear briefly in Tintin and the Picaros. They make a cameo appearance in the redrawn version of The Black Island; Willoughby-Drupe is shown interviewing the old Scotsman in the pub while both are seen in the crowd of reporters welcoming Tintin at the docks (page 61).

Hergé created the pair after being interviewed for Paris Match in August 1958 and finding the resulting piece dubious.

=== Professor Euclide ===
Professor Euclide is an absent-minded professor appearing in The Broken Ear who forgets his glasses, wears his cleaning-lady's overcoat, holds his cane upside down as if it were an umbrella, mistakes a parrot for a man, and leaves his briefcase next to a lamp post. In the original edition published in 1935, his name is given as Professor Euclide (after the Greek mathematician). He is one of Hergé's many prototypes for Professor Calculus.

=== Oliveira da Figueira ===
Senhor Oliveira da Figueira (or Oliveira de Figueira) is the friendly Portuguese salesman who can sell even the most trivial of items. He and Tintin first meet in Cigars of the Pharaoh. Tintin and Snowy have been cast adrift in the Red Sea when they are picked up by a dhow; Figueira is a passenger. He quickly talks Tintin into buying a variety of superfluous objects. He later appears in Land of Black Gold, where he plays a valuable role in helping Tintin infiltrate Dr. Müller's headquarters, taking Tintin there disguised as his nephew while keeping the guards distracted with an elaborate story. In The Red Sea Sharks, he hides Tintin and Captain Haddock in his house so they can speak to the Emir. He gets a brief mention in The Castafiore Emerald, when he sends good wishes to Captain Haddock following news claiming that he and Bianca Castafiore are engaged.

Oliveira de Figueira is the form used by Hergé in the later appearances of this character. He is named Oliveira da Figueira (lit. "Olive-tree of the Fig-tree") in his initial appearances. For The Red Sea Sharks Hergé changed his name to Oliveira de Figueira. (Both spellings are correct in Portuguese: "de" means "of", while "da" means "of the".)

=== Mrs. Finch ===
(French: Mme Pinson)

Mrs. Finch is Tintin's landlady at 26 Labrador Road, where Tintin lived before joining Captain Haddock at Marlinspike Hall. A simple soul, she was badly frightened when Bunji Kuraki of the Yokohama police force was kidnapped from the street outside Tintin's flat during The Crab with the Golden Claws.

The address 26 Labrador Road (French: 26, rue du Labrador) is also the real-life address of the Musée Hergé.

=== Henri Fourcart ===
Henri Fourcart is director of Fourcart Gallery that hosts the Alph-Art exhibition of artist Ramó Nash in Tintin and Alph-Art. When he is introduced to Captain Haddock, he recognises him as the friend of the famous Tintin and requests to meet him. He is killed in a car accident under suspicious circumstances before the meeting can take place.

=== Gino ===
Gino, who appears in Flight 714, is the steward on board the flight.

=== Grand Abbot ===
The Grand Abbot is head of an order of Tibetan Buddhist monks in Tintin in Tibet, who rescues Tintin and Captain Haddock from the mountains after they succumb to an avalanche. At first discouraging Tintin from his quest, he later presents Tintin with a khata scarf in honour of the bravery he has shown for his friend Chang Chong-Chen.

=== Sir Francis Haddock ===
(French: Chevalier François de Hadoque)

Sir Francis Haddock is an ancestor of Captain Haddock. He is a captain in the Royal Navy who commanded the Unicorn in 1676. In the original French version, he is Chevalier François de Hadoque, a ship-of-the-line captain in the French Navy who commands la Licorne for Louis XIV. (The English version changes this to Charles II of England.) He was rewarded by the king with the estate of Marlinspike Hall (Moulinsart) in 1685. Sir Francis was forced to scuttle the Unicorn when it was taken by pirate captain Red Rackham. After the Unicorn sank, Sir Francis lived for two years among the natives of the nearby tropical island. Upon returning home, Sir Francis concealed a treasure stolen from Red Rackham in the cellars of Marlinspike Hall, hiding clues to its location in three model ships of the Unicorn that he gave to his three sons.

He is mentioned obliquely in Flight 714 to Sydney by the Captain, who says "one of my ancestors went in for naval warfare."

There are hints that Sir Francis Haddock is an illegitimate son of Louis XIV, a possible reference to Hergé's own family history, as Hergé liked to believe that his father was the illegitimate son of King Leopold II of Belgium.

Sir Francis Haddock is portrayed by Andy Serkis (who also portrays Captain Haddock) in the motion capture film The Adventures of Tintin: The Secret of the Unicorn.

This character may have been inspired by Admiral Sir Richard Haddock.

=== Irma ===
Irma is the maid of Bianca Castafiore. Irma first appears in The Calculus Affair before appearing in The Castafiore Emerald. Castafiore describes her as a faithful, loyal, and honest servant. Despite giving a meek impression, she has a strong sense of personal pride: when Thomson and Thompson accuse Irma of stealing Castafiore's emerald, she becomes angry and assaults them with a walking stick. In Tintin and the Picaros, she is arrested and put in jail along with Castafiore and Igor Wagner. She also appears in Tintin and Alph-Art as a background character and is the person who informs Castafiore of Tintin and Captain Haddock's arrival to Endaddine Akass's villa.

=== Mik Kanrokitoff ===
(French: Mik Ezdanitoff)

Mik Kanrokitoff (Russian: Михаил Канрокитов Mikhail Kanrokitov) is a Russian writer for the magazine Space Week. His name is Ezdanitoff in the original version, another example of Hergé's Bruxellois wordplay; is dat niet tof in Dutch means "isn't that nice".

His fortuitous appearance in Flight 714 to Sydney helps Tintin, Captain Haddock, and their friends escape from an Indonesian island after Rastapopoulos and his cohorts set off an explosive charge, stirring up the island's volcano. Kanrokitoff wears a small antenna and transmitter that enables him to communicate telepathically with other people and even subject them to mass-hypnosis. He maintains close touch with an unseen race of extraterrestrials and it is their spaceship that enables Tintin and the others to escape the island.

Although he was never seen by Tintin and his friends after this, Kanrokitoff is depicted in some sketches of the unfinished Tintin and Alph-Art, in which he is at the inauguration of Ramó Nash's art exposition, apparently recognizing Tintin.

This character was inspired by French ufologist Jacques Bergier.

=== Bunji Kuraki ===
Bunji Kuraki is a Japanese detective of the Yokohama police force appearing in The Crab with the Golden Claws. He was investigating a powerful gang of drug smugglers in the Far East and followed their trail to Europe, but was kidnapped from the street outside Tintin's flat before he could warn him. He was finally able to meet Tintin at the end of the adventure after he had been freed by police.

=== Maharaja of Gaipajama ===
(French: Maharadjah de Rawhajpoutalah)

The Maharaja of Gaipajama is the monarch of a fictional princely state of India. He is kind and immediately trusting of Tintin, whom he meets in Cigars of the Pharaoh. The Maharaja explains that his family have long been fighting a criminal opium-smuggling gang. The Blue Lotus opens in the Maharaja's palace, where Tintin has been his guest.

Gaipajama is a nonsensical mix of two Hindi words: Gai (cow) and pajama. The original French name is Rawajpoutalah.

=== Arturo Benedetto Giovanni Giuseppe Pietro Archangelo Alfredo Cartoffoli da Milano ===
(French: Arturo Benedetto Giovanni Giuseppe Pietro Archangelo Alfredo Cartoffoli dé Milano)

Arturo Benedetto Giovanni Giuseppe Pietro Archangelo Alfredo Cartoffoli da Milano is the expert Italian driver of a Lancia Aurelia GT in The Calculus Affair. He eagerly helps Tintin and Captain Haddock pursue Syldavian agents who kidnapped Professor Calculus in the adventure's car chase. While speeding through a built-up area in the French Haute Savoie on market day, he was stopped by a gendarme who wanted to record his name. The flabbergasted gendarme meekly let him off with "Don't do it again." When they finally stopped the Syldavian car and did not find Calculus inside, Cartoffoli accused Tintin and the Captain of making up their story to get a free ride before zooming away. As an Italian driver, he has great pride in Italian cars, which he claims are the best in the world.

=== King Muskar XII ===
King Muskar XII is the monarch of Syldavia. He appears in King Ottokar's Sceptre. A keen motorist who drives his own car and keeps his own gun for protection, he is married to an unnamed queen consort. Because the Crown's sceptre once saved the life of King Ottokar IV in 1360, every year on Saint Vladimir's Day, 15 July, the current king must show the people that he has the sceptre; otherwise he will be forced to abdicate.

Tintin discovered a plot to steal the sceptre and set out to warn King Muskar XII, though traitorous elements in the king's entourage, led by his aide-de-camp Boris (Colonel Jorgen), were ready to stop him. Upon hearing of the plot, the monarch was fair-minded enough to investigate Tintin's claims, which turned out to be true: the sceptre had been stolen, a constitutional crisis was imminent, and Syldavia was about to be plunged into an invasion by its long-term enemy Borduria. Muskar then orders his ministers and generals to prevent the invasion. The revolutionary party in the adventure, called the Iron Guard, may have been inspired by the Fascist paramilitary groups widespread in Europe between the wars. The abdication crisis was very similar to that of the Anschluss in Austria in 1938, though the conclusion was not the same.

King Muskar XII and his country do not appear to have been based on definitive models; both were inspired by various Eastern European and Balkan states. Many of these states were monarchies ruled by Carol II of Romania, Zog I of Albania, Alexander I of Yugoslavia, and Boris III of Bulgaria. The king's costumes may have been inspired by the portrait of Spanish King Alfonso XIII and the Romanian prince Alexandru Ioan Cuza. The king bears a striking resemblance to Zog of Albania, a man who also carried a gun and confronted violent conspiracies. He is sometimes shown wearing a military uniform, holding the rank of Colonel of the Royal Guards. The king's military service is similar to members of other real European royal families, who have members that have served in their nation's militaries.

King Muskar XII is noticeably absent from the post-war stories set in Syldavia: he does not appear at the launching of the Moon rocket in Destination Moon and Tintin does not call on him for help when his friend Professor Calculus is kidnapped by Bordurian and later Syldavian agents in The Calculus Affair. The post-war Syldavia may no longer be a monarchy; the later Adventures set after World War II come at a time when the Balkan royal models for the fictional Syldavia had been overthrown and their rulers exiled.

=== Ramó Nash ===
Ramó Nash is an artist and the creator of Alph-Art that Captain Haddock purchases at the Fourcart Gallery in Tintin and Alph-Art. Tintin learns that Nash is under the control of Endaddine Akass to fabricate paintings of the masters in an art forgery ring.

In the unofficial completed version of Tintin and Alph-Art by Yves Rodier, Nash is of Jamaican nationality. He saves the lives of Tintin and Captain Haddock by defeating Akass.

=== Nestor ===
Nestor is the long-suffering butler of Marlinspike Hall. He is the epitome of a butler (or, in French, majordome) of French society. Noble, loyal, always the domestic servant, Nestor serves his master Captain Haddock and any house guests such as Tintin, Professor Calculus, or Bianca Castafiore.

Nestor made his first appearance in The Secret of the Unicorn serving as butler for the Bird brothers, Marlinspike Hall's original owners and the villains of the adventure. Tintin has been kidnapped by Max and G. Bird and locked in their cellar. When Tintin breaks out and attempts to contact his friends by the house telephone, Nestor enters the room and asks who he was. A scuffle ensues, during which Nestor loyally stands by his employers. By the end of the story when the Bird brothers' criminal activities are exposed, Nestor is cleared of any wrongdoing. All evidence at the Bird brothers' trial shows that Nestor was ignorant of their true agenda, while Tintin and Haddock reason that he cannot be judged for his previous masters' actions.

Nestor remains as the butler of Marlinspike Hall when Captain Haddock reclaims the property, Haddock regarding Nestor as part of the place. In The Castafiore Emerald, he is depicted as being suspicious of gypsies. He continues to be a staple character in all of the subsequent Tintin stories set at the hall, loyally serving his friends Haddock and Tintin.

=== Dr. Patella ===
(French: Docteur Rotule)

Dr. Patella is a ginger bearded osteopathic doctor who appears briefly in Destination Moon and Explorers on the Moon. His model skeleton is arrested by Thomson and Thompson, and later he attends to an unconscious Captain Haddock after his arrival back on Earth. He also sent a congratulatory telegram to Haddock when (incorrect) news of his engagement to Bianca Castafiore was announced in The Castafiore Emerald.

In 2000, on one episode of the French-language version of Who Wants to Be a Millionaire?, 73 percent of the voting audience correctly identified Dr. Patella (French: Docteur Rotule) as the doctor who treated Captain Haddock in Explorers on the Moon. This led to allegations that the show was rigged: one Tintin fan questioned how such a large portion of the audience could pick from four options the correct answer, especially given Dr. Patella's very minor role in the series. A psychoanalyst postulated that children remember proper names much better than adults, hence its retention by members of the audience who read Tintin in their youth.

The name Patella (and Rotule) has a medical origin. It means "kneecap".

=== Patrash Pasha ===
Sheikh Patrash Pasha is an Arab sheikh appearing in Cigars of the Pharaoh and a big fan of The Adventures of Tintin. He arranges for Tintin to be kidnapped, but when Tintin is brought before him, he recognises him from his adventures, frees him, and sends him on his way with fresh supplies. His servant shows Tintin an Adventures of Tintin book that Pasha owns. The book title shown to Tintin has changed over the years; it was originally Tintin in America, it became Tintin in the Congo at one point, and eventually settled on Destination Moon—the most recently published title at the time but, confusingly, takes place after the events in Cigars of the Pharaoh. In The Red Sea Sharks, when Emir Ben Kalish Ezab was overthrown by Bab El Ehr, the Emir temporarily took refuge with Patrash Pasha's tribesmen, who remained loyal.

=== Professor Philippulus ===
Professor Philippulus, or Philippulus the Prophet as he calls himself, is an astronomer who appears in The Shooting Star. After observing a ball of fire making its way towards Earth, Philippulus goes insane, dresses himself in white sheets, and goes around town beating a gong while claiming to be a prophet tasked with announcing the end of the world. The madman also decides that Tintin is a spawn of the Devil after he tried to calm him, and takes to harassing him at his home. Philippulus later escapes a mental asylum and makes it to the expedition ship Aurora, eventually taking refuge up the main mast and nearly setting off a stick of dynamite in the belief that it is a firework. Tintin tricks him into climbing down by using a megaphone to shout supposedly heavenly instructions for him; Philippulus relents and is taken back to the asylum.

Philippulus represents the dilemmas some face over religious belief and scientific research. In his case, the conflict took a toll on his mind when the end of the world appeared to be imminent.

=== Professor Phostle ===
(French: Professeur Hippolyte Calys)

Professor Decimus Phostle is an astronomer, observatory director, and expedition leader in The Shooting Star. Tintin consults him about a large bright star he saw in Ursa Major. Professor Phostle claims that it is a ball of fire that will hit the Earth and cause the end of the world the following morning, and actually looks forward to this, thinking that predicting the end of mankind would make him famous. Initially disappointed that the meteor has missed the Earth, Phostle consoles himself by naming an unknown metal fallen from the meteor after himself: "phostlite". He then leads an expedition of scientists to follow Tintin and Captain Haddock to attempt to retrieve the fallen phostlite from the sea.

Phostle was to return in Destination Moon and Explorers on the Moon as a villain, but that early draft by Bernard Heuvelmans was abandoned by Hergé. In Hergé's Adventures of Tintin (made from 1957 to 1964), he was replaced by Professor Calculus.

=== The Picaros ===
The Picaros are a band of guerillas in the country of San Theodoros, supposedly under the control of General Alcazar in Tintin and the Picaros. Alcazar has returned to his country and is attempting to command the Picaros to mount a guerrilla operation over of his arch-rival General Tapioca. However, the Picaros have become corrupt drunkards since Tapioca started dropping copious quantities of alcohol near their camp.

Tintin offers to cure the Picaros of their alcoholism if Alcazar agrees to refrain from killing Tapioca and his men. Alcazar reluctantly agrees. Moments after the Picaros are cured, a musical troupe called the Jolly Follies arrives, intending to perform at the upcoming carnival in San Theodoros. Alcazar, with a little advice from Tintin, launches an assault on Tapioca's palace during the carnival by dressing the Picaros in the troupe's costumes and sneaking them into the capital.

=== Prince of the Sun ===
The Prince of the Sun is the reigning monarch over a lost, Sun-worshipping Incan civilisation in Prisoners of the Sun. When Tintin's party invades his temple, the Prince plans to burn them at the stake, but change his mind when a solar eclipse occurs just before the sacrifice. Convinced that the Sun God favours Tintin, the Prince releases him and provides him with generous gifts of gold and jewels. In return, Tintin and his friends promise never to reveal the location of the Temple of the Sun.

=== Ridgewell ===
Ridgewell is a British explorer who travelled into the South American rainforest occupied by the Arumbayas. He first appears in The Broken Ear and appears later in Tintin and the Picaros. Ridgewell settled down with the Arumbayas and decided to stay, not caring if the outside world knew if he was dead or alive. When Tintin ventured into Arumbaya territory, Ridgewell initially fired darts at him in order to scare him away, but later agreed to take him to the Arumbaya village for information.

Ridgewell did bring some of Western civilisation to the Native South Americans, such as introducing them to the game of golf. However, the players do not appear to have mastered it well—on one occasion hitting Tintin rather than the hole in the ground.

Ridgewell's influence on the Arumbayas resulted in him gaining an enemy in the local witch doctor. When Ridgewell was captured by an enemy nation called the Rumbabas (Bibaros in the original version), the witch doctor kept this from the other Arumbayas, hoping to be rid of his rival. When one Arumbaya expressed concern for Ridgewell, the witch doctor threatened to turn him and his family into frogs. But Ridgewell got away and fired a dart into the witch doctor's bottom as punishment. Fortunately, unlike the Arumbayas, Ridgewell did not use poisoned darts.

Ridgewell is also a ventriloquist and has a sense of humour, shown on occasions such as in Tintin and the Picaros when he fired a dart into the cigar of General Alcazar. In that adventure, he reestablished ties with Tintin, and was shown to lament changes in the behaviour of the Arumbayas, namely the spread of alcoholism.

The character of Ridgewell is strongly reminiscent of the real-life British explorer Percy Fawcett who disappeared in the Amazon in 1925 under similar circumstances.

=== Ivan Ivanovitch Sakharine ===
Ivan Ivanovitch Sakharine lives in Brussels and is a collector of models of ships, among which, one is the Unicorn. He appears in The Secret of the Unicorn, in the old market. Noticing another model of the Unicorn, he and another man Barnaby try to buy it, only to find that it has already been claimed by Tintin. Tintin declines all the offers made by Barnaby and Sakharine to buy the model off him.

Tintin's Unicorn is later stolen and he suspects Sakharine of the theft. Visiting Sakharine, he discovers the other Unicorn model. Sakharine is later attacked by Barnaby who steals the parchment from the model ship. It is one of three parchments that lead to a treasure. The Bird brothers are later arrested and claim that the parchments they obtained have since been stolen. Tintin thinks Mr. Sakharine stole the two parchments, but he soon discovers they were pickpocketed by Aristides Silk and recovers them.

At the end of Red Rackham's Treasure, Mr. Sakharine can be seen attending the exhibition held at Marlinspike Hall, together with his landlady, showing off the various items recovered from the actual ship itself. He appears to have offered Captain Haddock his Unicorn model, which is shown in the display with the other two.

In the unfinished Tintin adventure Tintin and Alph-Art, the surviving drafts of the story suggest that Haddock and Tintin notice Sakharine at a meeting hosted by mystic Endaddine Akass.

In the film adaptation The Adventures of Tintin: The Secret of the Unicorn, Sakharine is reimagined as the main antagonist. The film portrays him as the descendant of the pirate Red Rackham, seeking vengeance on behalf of his ancestor against Sir Francis Haddock, who killed Rackham. Sakharine is portrayed by Daniel Craig (who also portrays Red Rackham) in the motion capture film.

=== Sanders-Hardiman expedition members ===
(French: Les membres de l'expédition Sanders-Hardtmut)

The Sanders-Hardiman expedition members brought the Incan mummy Rascar Capac back to Europe in The Seven Crystal Balls. The members of the expedition are: Professor Sanders-Hardiman (French: Professeur Sanders-Hardtmut, head of the expedition), Professor Reedbuck (French: Professeur Laubépin), Peter Clarkson (French: Clairmont, expedition photographer), Mark Falconer (French: Marc Charlet), Professor Paul Cantonneau (who also made an appearance in The Shooting Star), Dr. Midge (French: Docteur Hornet, director of the Darwin Museum), and Professor Hercules Tarragon (French: Professeur Hippolyte Bergamotte, who has the Rascar Capac mummy in his possession). They were hospitalised while cursed by the Incas as punishment for the theft of the mummy, put into comas and made to suffer nightmares. Tintin visited the Incas' hidden temple in order to save Professor Calculus, who had been kidnapped by them. He persuaded the Prince of the Sun to lift the curse, assuring the Incas that the expedition's purpose was not to steal from their people but simply to teach others about them. The Prince of the Sun releases his control over the Sanders-Hardiman expedition members and they awaken from their curse.

=== Sophocles Sarcophagus ===
(French: Philémon Siclone)

Sophocles Sarcophagus is an absent-minded professor and Egyptologist in search of the tomb of the Pharaoh Kih-Oskh, whom Tintin meets on a cruise ship at the beginning of Cigars of the Pharaoh. He is a bit of an eccentric: rowing a boat while unaware that it is not even in the water, saying goodbye to Snowy as if he was a little boy, and bumping into things and people. He is distracted, dresses Edwardian, and has an unusual beard. He is the first of a number of eccentric scholars that would culminate in the character Professor Calculus.

Sophocles leads Tintin to the tomb hidden under the sand, but disappears soon after finding it. He, Tintin, and Snowy end up floating in sarcophagi in the middle of the Red Sea. Sophocles is then picked up by a ship captained by Allan, a drug smuggler, whose gang uses the tomb of Kih-Oskh as a base. With Sophocles as a prisoner, the ship sets off for India.

When Cigars of the Pharaoh was first published in the 1930s, Sarcophagus was an unnamed and beardless scholar who wore sunglasses. When Tintin explored the tomb, he found sarcophagi for himself and Snowy but not for the scholar, who does not even turn up in the Red Sea incident—thus, how he ends up in India is unexplained. Tintin finds Sophocles in the Indian jungle completely by chance in a string of absurd coincidences, painting the symbol of Kih-Oskh on palm trees. Tintin even speculates that the scholar is a member of the gang of drug smugglers that he finds himself pitted against. Sophocles is now completely mad because he has been given poison called Rajaijah, imagining himself to be Pharaoh Ramesses II. He is eventually committed to a sanatorium in India for treatment. In The Blue Lotus, an antidote for Rajaijah was developed, but it was never revealed whether Sarcophagus was cured.

=== Aristides Silk ===
(French: Aristide Filoselle)

Aristides Silk is a pickpocket who becomes a pivotal character in The Secret of the Unicorn, inadvertently collecting the parchments leading to Red Rackham's Treasure. Silk claims he is not a thief, but admits he is a kleptomaniac. He explains he adores wallets and displays his large collection, none of which have been emptied of their contents.

He is first seen in the market near the beginning of the adventure, moving away from Thomson and Thompson just before they discover that their wallets have been stolen. He later steals Tintin's wallet containing the parchments of Sir Francis Haddock that hold the location of Red Rackham's treasure. He is among the invited guests at the end of that adventure in the Maritime Gallery at Marlinspike Hall.

Aristides Silk is portrayed by Toby Jones in the motion capture film The Adventures of Tintin: The Secret of the Unicorn.

=== Piotr Skut ===
(French: Piotr Szut)

Piotr Skut, an eyepatch-wearing Estonian pilot, appears in two albums: The Red Sea Sharks and Flight 714 to Sydney. In The Red Sea Sharks, Skut flies one of the DeHavilland Mosquitoes used by Sheikh Bab El Ehr to seize power in Khemed, and his squad strafes the boat Tintin and Haddock are using to cross the Red Sea. Tintin shoots down Skut's plane with an assault rifle in self-defence, but later rescues Skut from the waters onto a hastily assembled life raft. Grateful for his rescue, Skut becomes a faithful friend and later refuses to betray Tintin and Haddock, instead sharing the rest of the adventure with them. He repairs the sabotaged radio of the S.S. Ramona and steers the Ramona to outmaneuver torpedoes while Tintin calls for help, which arrives just in time to save the boat from a submarine's attack.

In Flight 714 to Sydney, Skut has become a supersonic business jet pilot of the Carreidas 160, the prototype jet for millionaire Laszlo Carreidas. The aircraft is then hijacked by his own crew, who were under the pay of criminal mastermind Rastapopoulos. Skut aids Tintin and Haddock in rescuing the other captured passengers and, after an adventure involving extraterrestrials, returns with them to civilisation.

Neither Piotr, Skut, nor Szut (in the original French) are plausible Estonian names. Piotr is Polish for Peter while the correct Estonian version would be Peeter. The name Skut was rather an excuse for a gag, as Captain Haddock believes he is telling him to "scoot" rather than introducing himself. In the original French, the Captain mistakes the name "Szut" for "zut", the French exclamation of frustration. In other international versions, his last name is changed to entail a rudely dismissive or slightly offensive term befitting the language in question.

The Skut character is based on Remi Milk, an Estonian pilot who escaped to Sweden from Estonia in an Arado floatplane.

=== Studios Hergé members ===
Hergé and other Studios Hergé members were not above drawing themselves and other characters into the action of some of the Adventures as cameo appearances. The creator admired Alfred Hitchcock and his frequent cameo appearances in his own films, starting with a cameo in the second frame of The Broken Ear (page 1, frame 2) as a museum visitor. Hergé, Edgar P. Jacobs, and Jacques Van Melkebeke appear in Tintin in the Congo (page 1, frame 1) as a man in a brown jacket, a dark-haired man in a grey suit, and a fair-haired man with glasses; in the same panel, also making a cameo appearance, are Thomson and Thompson. Edgar P. Jacobs appears in Cigars of the Pharaoh (on the cover and on page 8, frame 1) as a mummy marked "E. P. Jacobini". Hergé and Jacobs appear in King Ottokar's Sceptre (page 38, last frame) as men to the left in red and green dress uniforms, and later in the same book, Hergé, his wife Germaine, Jacobs, and Van Melkebeke appear (page 59, last frame) as a man on the right in a green uniform accompanying a woman in mauve, a monocled man on the right with black hair and breastplate, and a fair-haired man in evening wear on the left near the window. Hergé appears in The Calculus Affair (page 13, last frame) as a man standing by the tent smoking, equipped with a sketch pad and pen, while Jacobs who is dressed like Tintin can be seen standing near the gate with the bicycle. "Jacobini" makes another appearance as the star of the opera Faust, appearing in costume as Mephistopheles (page 53, frame 6) and then as the name on the poster in Bianca Castafiore's dressing room (page 54, frame 13). Another appearance for Van Melkebeke is in The Secret of the Unicorn (page 2, frame 14) where he is examining a book at the market when a man calls out that his suitcase is being stolen. Edgar P. Jacobs and Jacques Van Melkebeke appear in The Seven Crystal Balls, the first (page 16, frame 4) as a man in brown suit and black bow-tie in the middle box on the left, and the other (page 57, frame 2) as a man standing behind General Alcazar. Hergé (the back of his head) cameos as a technician in Destination Moon (page 18, frame 2 & 7) at Baxter's meeting while Jacobs turns up later as a fat technician (page 40, frame 8). The concluding frame of The Red Sea Sharks (page 62, last frame) sees Hergé cameo as a rain-coated adjudicator in the middle of the drive while Edgar Pierre Jacobs can be seen in bow tie and spectacles, seated beside the wireless. Studios Hergé member Bob de Moor does not appear.

Other cameos in the Adventures include Auguste Piccard, whom the character Professor Calculus is based on (appearing in The Shooting Star, page 21, frame 2, as the scientist on the far right) and Quick & Flupke, characters in a separate Hergé series (appearing in Tintin in the Congo, page 1, frame 1, as two boys in the group, and also appearing in The Shooting Star, page 20, frame 8, as two boys running ahead of Thomson and Thompson, who are also making a cameo appearance in that book).

=== Professor Tarragon ===
(French: Professeur Hippolyte Bergamotte)

Professor Hercules Tarragon hosts a mysterious evening for Tintin and his friends in The Seven Crystal Balls. He was one of the Sanders-Hardiman expedition members and displays the mummy of Rascar Capac in his home. He had previously been a classmate of Professor Calculus and this connection enables Calculus, Tintin and Captain Haddock to visit him at home one evening while he is under heavy guard during a summer rainstorm.

Professor Tarragon is a large, strong, and ebullient character, whom Calculus formally called "Hercules". Tarragon seems fearless until a fireball bursts through his chimney and vaporises the mummy; he then becomes very shaken and fears that an ancient prophecy is coming true. That same night, he is the last to be attacked by means of the crystal balls.

=== Tharkey ===
Tharkey is a Sherpa guide who helps Tintin locate the ill-fated Patna-Kathmandu flight carrying Chang Chong-Chen in Tintin in Tibet. Although reluctant to risk the perilous attempt to find Chang, whom he believes to be dead, Tharkey leads Tintin and Captain Haddock to the crash site of the aircraft. After initially leaving the site to return to his village, he feels guilty for leaving them alone and returns just in time to help Tintin and Haddock out of a dangerous situation. However, he subsequently breaks his arm from an avalanche and must return to the plains after partly convalescing at a Buddhist monastery while Tintin and the Captain continue their search for Chang.

Tharkey was based on Ang Tharkay, a Nepalese mountain climber and explorer who acted as sherpa and later sirdar for many Himalayan expeditions. He was "beyond question the outstanding sherpa of his era" and he introduced Tenzing Norgay to the world of mountaineering.

=== Alfredo Topolino ===
Alfredo Topolino is a Swiss expert in ultrasonics residing in Nyon, Switzerland, who appears in The Calculus Affair. An acquaintance of Professor Calculus, he survives first an assault on his doorstep then the destruction of his house by Bordurian agents interested in Calculus's work. His manservant Boris works for the secret service of that country. His last name means "little mouse" in Italian.

=== Martine Vandezande ===
Martine Vandezande is the attractive assistant of Henri Fourcart at his art gallery in Tintin and Alph-Art. She wears large glasses and is a follower of Endaddine Akass. Tintin realizes "this girl seems sincere" after he inadvertently causes her to cry when evidence he uncovered leads him to accuse her as being part of the plot. Due to a listening device someone has hidden in her necklace, she is made an unwitting informer of Akass and his henchmen.

=== Igor Wagner ===
Igor Wagner is the quiet pianist working for Bianca Castafiore. He is driving with his employer when she first encounters Tintin in King Ottokar's Sceptre. He does not contribute to a plotline until The Castafiore Emerald, when he is discovered to be a gambler who bets on races in secret. He has a small moustache and dresses formally in black. After the thievery of Castafiore's emeralds, his attempts to help only incriminate him, as it was his footprints found near Castafiore's window, it was him suspiciously rummaging in the attic, and it was he who broke a step on the staircase. He tries to sneak out of his practice sessions (dictated by Castafiore) and, instead of practising, is caught using a playback tape recorder. He was imprisoned along with Castafiore and Irma in Tintin and the Picaros, before being freed by Tintin.

His name is made up of a humorous reference to two well-known composers: Igor Stravinsky and Richard Wagner.

=== Wang Chen-Yee ===
(French: Wang Jen-Ghié)

Wang Chen-Yee is the Chinese leader of the Sons of the Dragon brotherhood featured in The Blue Lotus. He serves as Tintin's host during his stay in China, and later adopts Chang Chong-Chen.

=== Frank Wolff ===
Frank Wolff is the rocket engineer who assists Professor Calculus during the Syldavian expedition to the Moon (Destination Moon and Explorers on the Moon). In an interview, Hergé described him as clever, stating he had a PhD in Mathematics with Mechanics and a BEng in Chemical Engineering, but also described him as feeble and quiet.

Wolff is ultimately exposed as a spy who was coerced into helping an unnamed foreign power hijack the Moon rockets he had helped build, after they learnt of his former compulsive gambling and heavy debt. After refusing to allow the enemy agent Colonel Jorgen to shoot the rest of the rocket crew, his struggle for Jorgen's gun resulted in the agent's accidental death. As the rocket ship is returning to Earth without enough oxygen for Tintin and his friends, Wolff, still overcome with guilt over the way he had betrayed his companions, redeems himself for his past mistakes and sacrifices himself for the survival of the group by throwing himself into space leaving a note of apology. Even the cynical Captain Haddock, who had, until the last moment, still suspected Wolff of treachery, was moved by his selfless act.

=== The yeti ===
The yeti is the mysterious cryptid in Tintin in Tibet. He helps Tintin's old friend Chang when his plane crashes.

=== Zorrino ===
Zorrino is an indigenous Peruvian boy who makes a living by selling oranges in the mountain town of Jauja. In Prisoners of the Sun, he leads Tintin and Captain Haddock on the trail of their kidnapped friend Professor Calculus to the Incan civilisation in the mountains. At the end of the adventure, Zorrino is invited to stay in the Inca city and follow their way of life, an invitation which he accepts.
