= The Red Sea Sharks =

Comic album by Belgian cartoonist Hergé

The Red Sea Sharks (Coke en stock)
- Cover of the English edition
- Date: 1958
- Series: The Adventures of Tintin
- Publisher: Casterman

Creative team
- Creator: Hergé

Original publication
- Published in: Tintin magazine
- Date of publication: 31 October 1956 – 1 January 1958
- Language: French

Translation
- Publisher: Methuen
- Date: 1960
- Translator: Leslie Lonsdale-Cooper; Michael Turner

Chronology
- Preceded by: The Calculus Affair (1956)
- Followed by: Tintin in Tibet (1960)

The Red Sea Sharks (French: Coke en stock) is the nineteenth volume of The Adventures of Tintin, the comic series by Belgian cartoonist Hergé. The story was initially serialised weekly in Belgium's Tintin magazine from October 1956 to January 1958 before being published in a collected volume by Casterman in 1958. The narrative follows the young reporter Tintin, his dog Snowy, and his friend Captain Haddock as they travel to the fictional Middle Eastern kingdom of Khemed with the intention of aiding the Emir Ben Kalish Ezab in regaining control after a coup d'état by his enemies, who are financed by slave traders led by Tintin's old nemesis Rastapopoulos.

Following on from the previous volume in the series, The Calculus Affair, The Red Sea Sharks was created with the aid of Hergé's team of artists at Studios Hergé. Influenced by Honoré de Balzac's The Human Comedy, Hergé used the story as a vehicle in which to reintroduce a wide range of characters who had first appeared in earlier instalments of the series. The story dealt with the trade of enslaved Africans across the Arab world, specifically the Red Sea slave trade, which was ongoing at the time of its publication. However, in the 1960s the story generated controversy as Hergé was repeatedly accused of having portrayed the Africans in a racist manner. He was upset by these claims, and made alterations to the depiction of the Africans in later reprints. Hergé continued The Adventures of Tintin with Tintin in Tibet, and the series as a whole became a defining part of the Franco-Belgian comics tradition. The Red Sea Sharks was critically well-received, with various commentators describing it as one of the best Tintin adventures. The story was adapted for both the 1991 Ellipse/Nelvana animated series The Adventures of Tintin and the 1992-3 BBC Radio 5 dramatisation of the Adventures.

== Synopsis ==
In Brussels, Tintin and Captain Haddock bump into an old acquaintance, General Alcazar. Returning to Marlinspike Hall, they find that another acquaintance, the Emir of Khemed, Mohammed Ben Kalish Ezab, has been overthrown by his nemesis Sheikh Bab El Ehr, and that the Emir has accordingly sent his son, the disobedient Abdullah, to stay at Marlinspike for his own protection. The police detectives Thomson and Thompson visit, informing Tintin that Alcazar is seeking to purchase military aircraft from J. M. Dawson. After further investigation, Tintin discovers that Dawson has also sold military aircraft to Bab El Ehr.

Realising that the only way to be rid of Abdullah is to restore the Emir's control of Khemed, Tintin, Haddock, and their dog Snowy travel to the Middle Eastern country. However, the trio narrowly survive a bomb planted aboard the plane to kill them as a result of Dawson discovering that Tintin spied on him. Meanwhile, a fight breaks out between Haddock, the angry man and Tintin. The pilot had ordered to make an emergency crash landing. With the fire now extinguished and the evacuation of passengers from a burning plane, the trio are able to slip into the city of Wadeshah unobserved. There they meet an old friend, the Portuguese merchant Oliveira da Figueira, who helps them to escape the city and ride on horseback to the Emir's hideout. During the journey, they evade armoured cars and fighter planes ordered to intercept them by "Mull Pasha", who is actually Tintin's old nemesis, Dr. Müller.

Meanwhile, back at Marlinspike Hall, Abdullah finds Nestor who is bound and gagged into a chair in a kitchen and Professor Calculus later turns up while roller-skating. Later, the Emir welcomes Tintin and Haddock. It then transpires, from the Emir's explanation, that there is an ongoing slave trade through Khemed that is operated by the international businessman called "the Marquis di Gorgonzola", who falsely offers transport to African Muslims on the pilgrimage to Mecca, but then sells them into slavery somewhere along the journey. Tintin, Haddock and Snowy leave for the Red Sea coast and board a sambuk for Mecca, but are attacked by fighter planes. Tintin shoots one down and rescues its mercenary Estonian pilot, Piotr Skut. The four are picked up by di Gorgonzola's yacht, the Scheherazade, but are soon offloaded onto the SS Ramona, a tramp steamer. Di Gorgonzola, it turns out, is another of Tintin's previous adversaries, Roberto Rastapopoulos.

The Ramona is one of Rastapopoulos' slave trading ships, and when a fire breaks out aboard it during the night, the ship's commander Allan and his crew cowardly flee, leaving Tintin, Haddock, Snowy and Skut aboard along with a consignment of African slaves. With Haddock taking on the ship's captaincy, they are successfully able to put out the fire. However, Rastapopoulos orders a U-boat to destroy the Ramona, with the ship taking evasive manoeuvres to survive, ultimately being rescued by a fighter from the cruiser USS Los Angeles after Tintin dispatches numerous distress calls. The Los Angeles chases down the Scheherazade and attempts to capture di Gorgonzola, but he fakes his own death and escapes via a mini-submarine. Tintin, Haddock, and Snowy return to Belgium and learn that the Emir has recaptured Khemed and with the war now over at Khemed so that Abdullah can return home. Their relaxation is cut short by a surprise visit from Jolyon Wagg, who has arranged to use Marlinspike for an auto rally.

== History ==
=== Background and publication ===
Hergé was inspired to develop the plot for The Red Sea Sharks after reading a magazine article detailing the continued existence of the slave trade within the Arab world, in which it was claimed that African pilgrims headed to Mecca were being enslaved during the journey. One of the routes that supplied the Red Sea slave trade where hajj pilgrims, and the Red Sea Slave trade was still ongoing in the 1950s, slavery in Saudi Arabia and in Yemen being banned in 1962, slavery in Dubai in 1963 and in Oman in 1970. Hergé included a reference to this slave trade in the story's original French title, Coke en Stock ("Coke on Board"), which referred to the slave smuggler's use of "coke" as a codeword for the enslaved people.

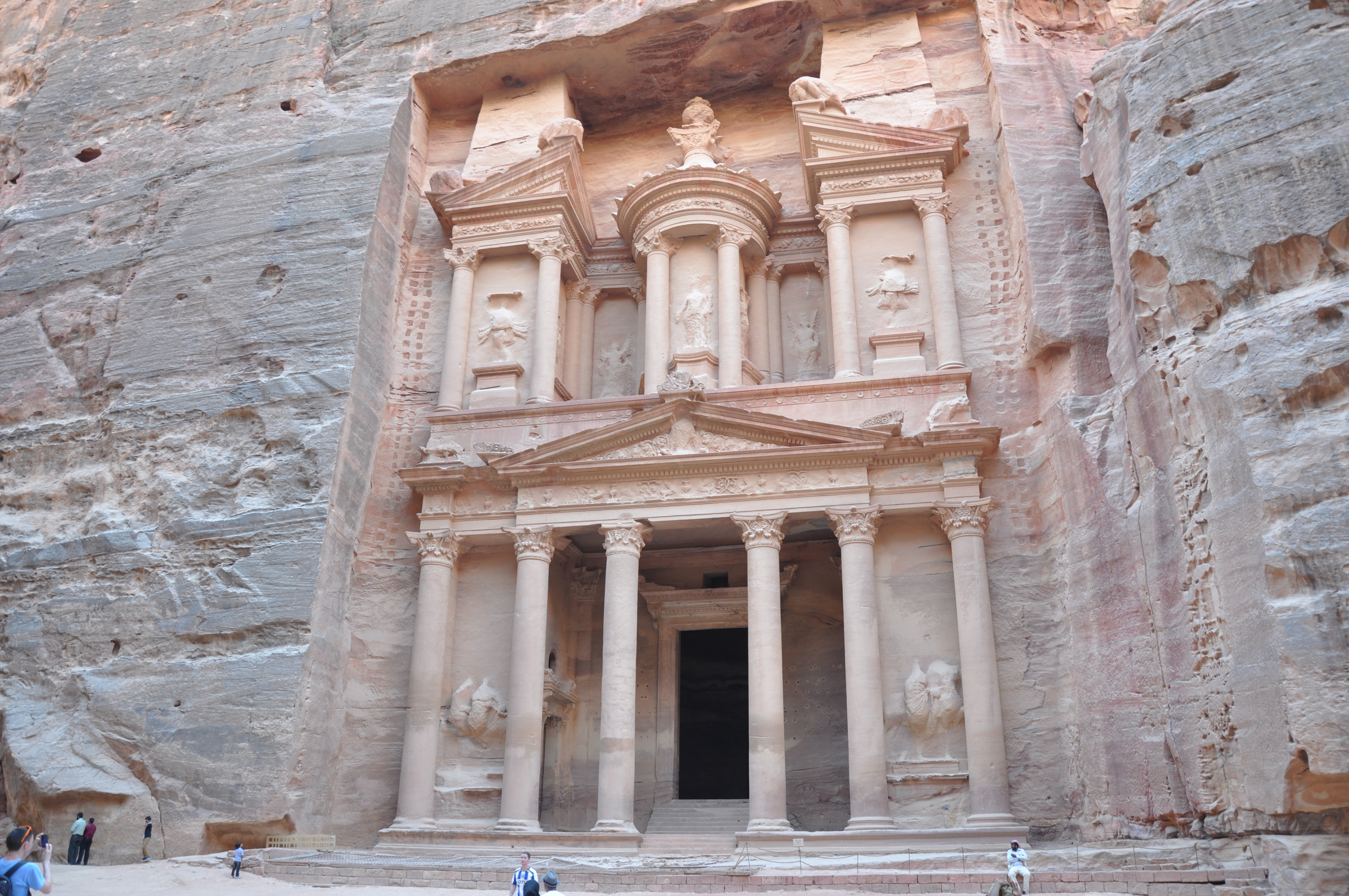
The Treasury (Al Khazneh) in Petra depicted in the book

Before writing the story, Hergé had read Balzac et son monde ("Balzac and His World"), a 1955 book written by his friend Félicien Marceau. Intrigued by the work of Honoré de Balzac, Hergé was inspired by how Balzac kept reusing characters from his previous stories and he subsequently adopted this trait for The Red Sea Sharks, in which a wide range of characters from The Adventures of Tintin make a reappearance. Hergé also introduced a new character, the Estonian pilot Piotr Skut, who would later reappear in Flight 714 to Sydney.

To produce accurate illustrations for the Ramona, Hergé and his assistant Bob de Moor travelled aboard a Swedish cargo vessel, the MS Reine Astrid, from Antwerp to Gothenburg and back, during which they took photographs and drew sketches. Hergé had also collected press clippings depicting the Christina, a motor yacht owned by the Greek shipping magnate Aristotle Onassis, and used them as the basis for his depiction of Rastapopoulos' ship, the Sheherezade. The aircraft, cars, and machinery that appear in the story were drawn by Roger Leloup, one of the members of the Studios Hergé. In one scene in the latter part of the story, Hergé included a frogman, whose depiction was drawn from a press clipping of Lionel Crabb. His depiction of the Emir's hideaway palace cut from the rock was based on the Al Khazneh in Petra, Jordan, which he had seen in an issue of National Geographic.

Hergé's growing interest in art was reflected in the story, as he included a copy of Alfred Sisley's Le Canal du Loing at Marlinspike Hall. He also included paintings by Pablo Picasso and Joan Miró aboard Rastapopolous' Scheherazade. Muller's pseudonym in the story, Mull Pasha, was based upon the British soldier Glubb Pasha. The character of Piotr Skut was based on Remi Milk, an Estonian pilot who escaped to Sweden from Estonia in an Arado floatplane. In the final scene, Hergé included cameos of both himself and his friend and colleague Edgar P. Jacobs.

The story began serialisation in Belgium's Tintin magazine in October 1956, before being serialised in the French edition of the magazine in December. It was then published in book form by Casterman in 1958. Upon the story's British publication in 1960, Coke en Stock was renamed The Red Sea Sharks.

=== Racism allegations and alterations ===
Hergé had been accused of exhibiting a racist attitude toward Africans in Tintin in the Congo, an earlier story, and potentially hoped to exonerate himself from such criticism by depicting Tintin and Haddock freeing African slaves in The Red Sea Sharks. In preparing the latter story he had consulted a colleague who worked for an African-themed magazine, L'Afrique et le Monde ("Africa and the World"); they translated some of the passages that Hergé wished to include in the story into Yoruba. However, in January 1962 an article in the magazine Jeune Afrique criticised Hergé for a racist depiction of Africans in the story, an accusation that would be echoed in other publications. These claims focused on the African characters' simplistic use of pidgin language, which was similar to the speech patterns used in Tintin in the Congo.

African: "You speak well, Effendi. Wicked Arab, very wicked. Poor black men do not want to be slaves. Poor black men want to go to Mecca".
Haddock: "Naturally, I realise that. But I repeat if you go there, you'll be sold as slaves. Is that what you want?"
African: "We not slaves, Effendi. We good Muslims. We want to go to Mecca".

Hergé biographer Benoît Peeters expressed the view that "for the most part these attacks were extremely unfair". Hergé was emotionally affected by the accusations, and made changes to the book for its 1967 reprint accordingly; here he changed the Africans' speech patterns, giving them improved grammar. However, he left Haddock speaking pidgin in response to the Africans.

For this version, he also made changes to the Emir's letter to Tintin; the former version had been formal in its prose, saying "Most esteemed and well-beloved friend, I entrust to you my son Abdullah, to improve his English. Here the situation is serious. Should any misfortune befall me I count on you, my friend, to care for Abdullah". In Hergé's revised edition, he adopts a more florid prose style: "This is to tell you, oh highly esteemed friend, that I entrusted to you Abdullah, my adored son. Because here the situation is serious. Should misfortune descend on me like the hawk on an innocent gazelle (for the world is made of life and death) I am sure that Abdullah will find you with warmth and affection, refuge and peace. And in doing this you will be performing a fragrant act before Allah".

Hergé also expressed regret that he depicted the death of a shark in the story, later stating that "I still believed that sharks were big evil beasts" when writing The Red Sea Sharks.

== Critical analysis ==
"[In The Red Sea Sharks], total confusion puts an end to the Manichaenism of the opening adventures. The former opposition between Good and Evil now becomes the opposition between the private and the public. Unable to judge such a complex world, Tintin prefers to withdraw from it. He reluctantly takes on this adventure as a traveler without baggage and spends little time with people he formerly would have gotten to know quite well".

— Jean-Marie Apostolidès

Commenting on the inclusion of a wide range of characters from The Adventures of Tintin, Harry Thompson referred to the story as "a Tintin family reunion", commenting that it was "a story unusually full of the type of people Captain Haddock liked to avoid". Michael Farr believed that in reviving so many older characters, Hergé had given The Red Sea Sharks "a marked retrospective quality". Jean-Marc Lofficier and Randy Lofficier felt that the "crowded" nature of the story left little room for series regulars Professor Calculus or Thomson and Thompson, and resulted in the new character of Skut serving only as "a nice supporting character, but nothing more". The Lofficiers stated that "Hergé was doing some house-cleaning of his past works and characters before embarking on something more serious and with more personal resonance", Tintin in Tibet.

Hergé biographer Benoît Peeters described The Red Sea Sharks as a "complex, ambiguous, even labyrinthine" story which was "undoubtedly the book in which Hergé ventured furthest into the creation of his own universe". He thought that "Hergé enters a new phase" with The Red Sea Sharks, as its author "seems to know his family of characters better and better, and he enjoys playing with them and his reader". Peeters noted that the book was "in some respects a continuation" of Land of Black Gold, an assessment shared by Thompson, the Lofficiers, and Farr, all of whom described it as a partial sequel to the earlier book. Thompson added that The Red Sea Sharks "atoned for the relative failure" of Land of Black Gold, believing that although it had a "rather hasty finish", it was "a first-rate thriller". The Lofficiers awarded it four out of five, stating that it was "very effective as a modern political thriller and far more believable than The Calculus Affair". They also opined that it provided an effective political commentary on the West's relationship with the Arab world. In their analysis, Tintin and Haddock seek to aid the Emir not because he is a good leader, but for their own selfish purposes (to get Abdullah out of Marlinspike), just as Western governments and corporations build alliances with Arab leaders guilty of human rights abuses in order to benefit their own interests.

Thompson felt that the inclusion of slavery as a key theme led to this book being "one of Hergé's more adult-oriented adventures". Nevertheless, Farr noted that the story contained "a good measure of humour" to balance out these darker elements. Farr drew comparisons with Anthony Powell's A Dance to the Music of Time, a series of novels that was contemporary to The Red Sea Sharks and which was similarly inspired by Balzac's The Human Comedy. Hergé biographer Pierre Assouline believed that The Red Sea Sharks represented "the culmination of his golden age", which had begun with The Blue Lotus. He also commented that "it almost seemed as if Hergé had regained the pace and rhythm of his most creative period" with this story.

In his psychoanalytical study of The Adventures of Tintin, the literary critic Jean-Marie Apostolidès expressed the view that The Red Sea Sharks reflected a world in which traditional values have been degraded and everything – including human life – has become a commodity. He added that Rastapopoulos becomes "the embodiment of the global market" in this story, tying together all of the other characters and therefore replacing Tintin as the figure "at the centre of the universe". Apostolidès opined that The Red Sea Sharks amplifies "the theme of the general equivalence of everything" that is present in the series, serving as "a kind of retrospective" by introducing old characters and establishing new relationships between them. He believed that the theme of the mirage pervaded the story, appearing repeatedly in such forms as Abdullah's cuckoo clock which concealed a water squirter and the pseudonyms employed by the various characters throughout the narrative. The literary critic Tom McCarthy stated that The Red Sea Sharks exhibited a number of themes that recurred throughout The Adventures of Tintin. He believed that a scene in which one of Bab El Ehr's men spies on the Emir in his mountain hideaway reflected a wider theme of eavesdropping that features throughout the series. McCarthy also highlighted Tintin's actions in returning Abdullah to Khemed, expressing the view that it is part of a wider running theme throughout the series in which the hero takes abandoned children to their home; other instances included Tintin's discovery of an adoptive family for the orphan Chang Chong-Chen in The Blue Lotus and the delivery of the lost gypsy child Miarka to her family in The Castafiore Emerald.

== Adaptations ==
In 1991, a collaboration between the French studio Ellipse and the Canadian animation company Nelvana adapted 21 of the stories – among them The Red Sea Sharks – into a series of episodes, each 42 minutes long. Directed by Stéphane Bernasconi, the series has been praised for being "generally faithful", with compositions having been actually directly taken from the panels in the original comic book.
