= Bianca Castafiore =

Comic character by Belgian cartoonist Hergé

Publication information
- Publisher: Casterman (Belgium)
- First appearance: King Ottokar's Sceptre (1939); The Adventures of Tintin
- Created by: Hergé

In-story information
- Full name: Bianca Castafiore
- Partnerships: List of main characters
- Supporting character of: Tintin

Bianca Castafiore (Italian pronunciation: [ˈbjaŋka kastaˈfjoːre]), nicknamed the "Milanese Nightingale" (French: le Rossignol milanais), is a fictional character in The Adventures of Tintin, the comics series by Belgian cartoonist Hergé. She is an opera singer who frequently appears in the comics. Although she is famous and revered the world over, most of the main characters find her voice shrill and appallingly loud: most notably Captain Haddock, who ironically is the object of Castafiore's affections. She also has a habit of mispronouncing everyone's names (such as "Hammock", "Paddock", and "Fatstock" for Haddock), with the exception of Tintin and her personal assistants. Castafiore is comically portrayed as narcissistic, whimsical, absent-minded, and talkative, but often shows a more generous and essentially amiable side, in addition to an iron will.

Her given name means "white" (feminine) in Italian, and her surname is Italian for "chaste flower". She first appeared in 1939, but from the 1950s, Hergé partially remodelled her after the Greek soprano Maria Callas.

== Character history ==
The comical Italian opera diva first appears in King Ottokar's Sceptre, and is also in The Seven Crystal Balls, The Calculus Affair, The Castafiore Emerald, The Red Sea Sharks, Tintin and the Picaros, and would have appeared in the unfinished Tintin and Alph-Art. She is played on radio in Land of Black Gold and in Tintin in Tibet, Captain Haddock imagines her singing in Flight 714 to Sydney, and mentions her famous aria in Destination Moon. Although she is apparently one of the leading opera singers of her generation, the only thing that Castafiore is ever heard to sing are a few lines of her signature aria, "The Jewel Song" (l'air des bijoux, from Gounod's Faust), always at ear-splitting volume (and violent force—certainly enough to part the Captain's hair, shatter glasses and a breeze enough to blow back a curtain in an opera box—"She's in fine voice tonight.").

When on tour, she usually travels with her piano accompanist, Igor Wagner, and her maid, Irma. At odds with her reputation as a leading opera singer, in The Seven Crystal Balls, she appears third on the bill of a variety show (although at an opera house), following a genuine clairvoyant act and a knife thrower (revealed to be General Alcazar), and preceding a magician. She is depicted as a preening, melodramatic diva, although she has a kind heart. In The Calculus Affair, for example, she provides a diversion to distract the sinister Colonel Sponsz so that Tintin and Captain Haddock can escape and rescue their friend Calculus. A recurring comic trope in the series is Haddock's aversion to Castafiore, who can never remember his name (addressing him variously as Hammock, Paddock, Padlock, Hemlock, Hassock, Havoc, Maggot, Bartok, and Bootblack, among other names). Gossip journalists once reported a romance and engagement between Castafiore and Haddock in The Castafiore Emerald, complete with photographs of Castafiore showing a disgruntled Haddock the flowers in his own garden. This quite chagrined the captain, but not the diva, who was quite used to such inventions from the tabloids.

Castafiore was once falsely imprisoned by the South American dictator General Tapioca and Colonel Sponsz in order to lure Calculus, Haddock and Tintin to San Theodoros where they prepare a deadly trap for them and Tapioca's rival, Alcazar (Tintin and the Picaros). Their ruse backfired, not least because Castafiore expressed her contempt for her show trial and her life sentence with her trademark ear-splitting rendition of the Jewel Song. The court had to be cleared. In prison, Castafiore made her jailers suffer even more by throwing her pasta over their heads because they had not cooked it al dente.

== Character background and influences ==
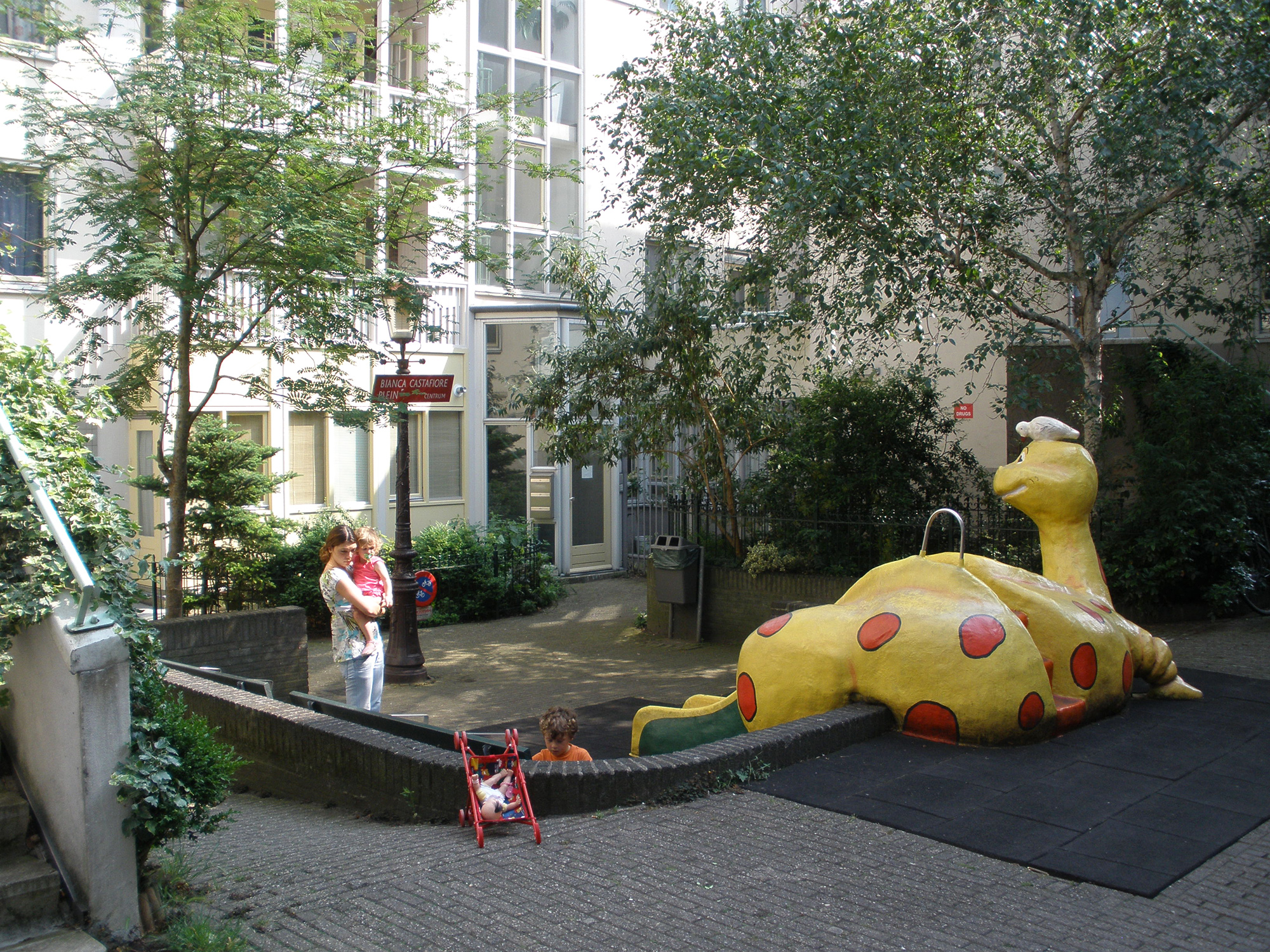
The "Bianca Castafiore Plein", a tiny square along Verversstraat in Amsterdam named after the fictional opera singer Bianca Castafiore, a character in the comic books The Adventures of Tintin.

Opera was one of Hergé's pet peeves. "Opera bores me, to my great shame. What's more, it makes me laugh," he once admitted. And so, perhaps not surprisingly, he created an archetypical singer who makes the reader laugh.

Though la Castafiore is obviously Italian, her pet aria is from a French opera (Faust was composed by Charles Gounod) rather than the Verdi, Puccini, Bellini, or Donizetti one might have expected from a star of La Scala (although in The Castafiore Emerald, she mentions that her regular repertoire includes Rossini, Puccini, Verdi, and Gounod. She is also called by La Scala to perform in La Gazza Ladra, by Rossini, an opera whose title is the key to solving the mystery of the thefts in the episode.) Faust, and this aria in particular, was among the most famous of all operas in Hergé's time. Furthermore, the choice of this aria is intentionally comic: Hergé depicts the aging, glamorous and utterly self-absorbed opera diva as Marguerite, the picture of innocence, taking delight in her own image in the mirror, with the oft-repeated quote: Ah, I laugh to see myself so beautiful in this mirror!.

Bianca Castafiore is portrayed by Kim Stengel in the 2011 film The Adventures of Tintin: Secret of the Unicorn, which merges plots from several books. Renée Fleming provided the singing voice. Although Sra. Castafiore invariably sings her signature aria in Hergé's books, in the film, the character presents a different aria, "Je veux vivre..." from Gounod's Romeo et Juliette. Oddly, the lead-in (played by an invisible orchestra) is the introduction to yet another coloratura aria, "Una voce poco fa", from Rossini's Barber of Seville.

The asteroid 1683 Castafiore, discovered in 1950, is named after the character.

Kim Newman includes Castafiore in his alternative history novels Moriarty: The Hound of the D'Urbervilles and Dracula Cha Cha Cha along with many other characters from other authors.

Bianca Castafiore is said to have been inspired by Hergé's own grandmother—Hergé believed that his father was an illegitimate son of the Belgian king Leopold II, but only his grandmother could have known the truth. He added subtle references such as operas that Bianca sang, referring to such stories.

== See also ==
- List of The Adventures of Tintin characters

== Bibliography ==
- Farr, Michael (2007). Tintin & Co. London: John Murray Publishers Ltd. ISBN 978-1-4052-3264-7.
- Peeters, Benoît (2012) [2002]. Hergé: Son of Tintin. Tina A. Kover (translator). Baltimore, Maryland: Johns Hopkins University Press. ISBN 978-1-4214-0454-7.
