= List of ships in The Adventures of Tintin =

This list of boats in The Adventures of Tintin compiles the names and simplified descriptions of the ships mentioned or depicted in The Adventures of Tintin, a fictional universe created by the cartoonist Hergé. The maritime world's omnipresence plays a significant role in the series, especially with the introduction of Captain Haddock in The Crab with the Golden Claws in 1940.

True to his quest for realism and authenticity, Hergé, who aims to produce a demanding and coherent work, provides rich research to faithfully represent his ships. He thus gathers a large iconographic documentation, but also draws from models or sketches made on the spot.

== The maritime world in The Adventures of Tintin ==
"If we can speak of a hymn to the sea in Hergé's work, it is also because the latter represents the only access to the unknown. For Tintin, thirsty for adventures and who, in The Shooting Star, has already set foot on the soil of four continents, the sea remains the only space still virgin and unexplored, which allows him to breathe air that no one has yet breathed."

— Samuel Bidaud, For a poetics of the sea in Tintin.

=== A setting present since the birth of the series ===
The sea plays a significant role in The Adventures of Tintin, with a maritime theme featured on the covers of five albums: The Black Island, The Shooting Star, The Secret of the Unicorn, Red Rackham's Treasure, and The Red Sea Sharks. Hergé draws inspiration from the literary and cinematic traditions of the late 19th century to the interwar period, which is based on the Western collective imagination where the sea holds both fascination and fear. Moreover, the only novel that Tintin reads in his Adventures is a classic of the genre, Treasure Island by Robert Louis Stevenson.

However, in the early adventures of the series, particularly until King Ottokar's Sceptre in 1939, Tintin is portrayed as a traveling hero. He utilizes various modes of transportation, traversing land, sea, and air, with a focus on speed and distance. Literary critic Philippe Goddin points out: "For about ten years, Tintin maintained with the maritime universe, and more generally with the liquid element, the same frank and uninhibited relationship that he displayed towards other means of transport."

=== The "maritime cycle" of the Adventures ===
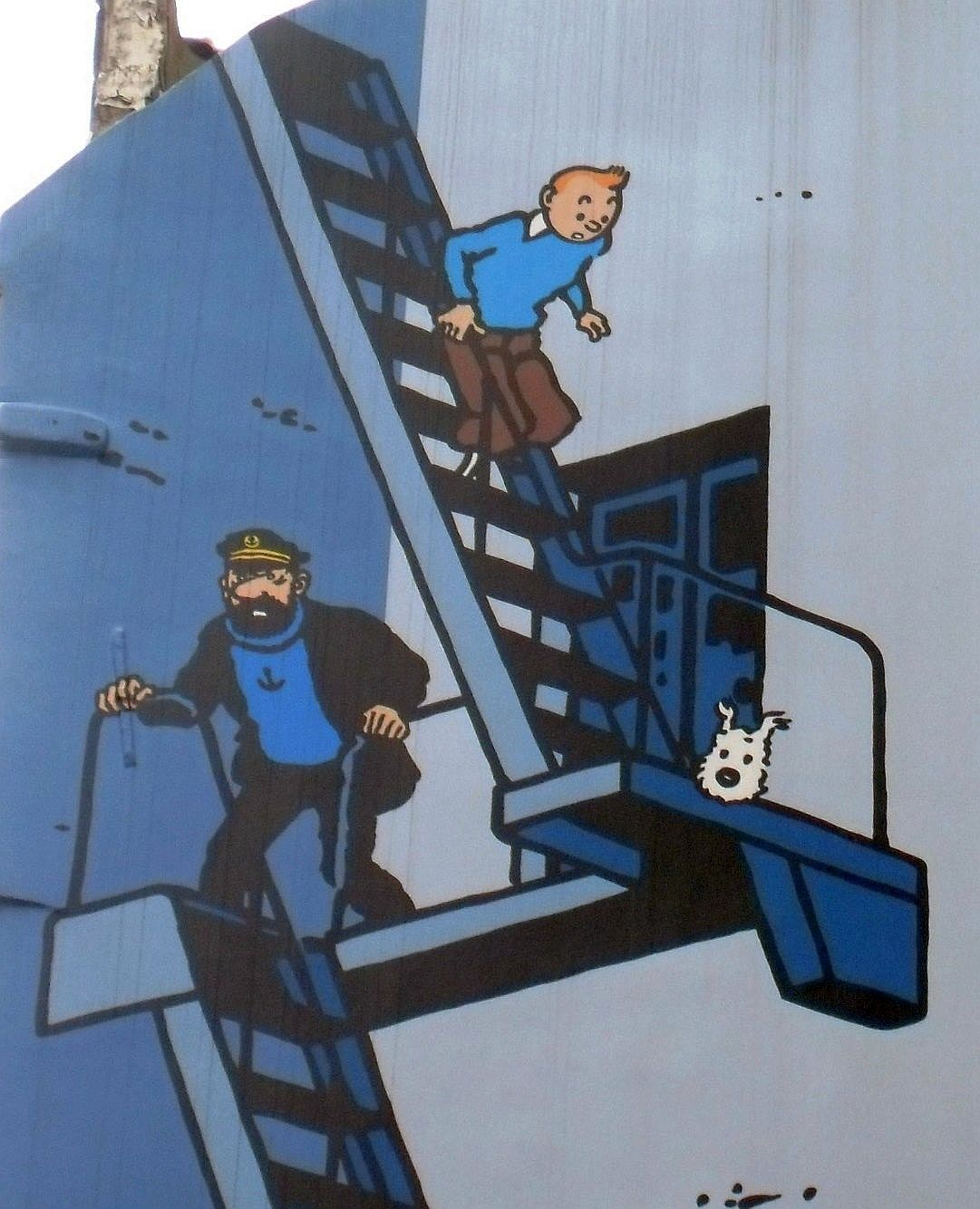
Captain Haddock's encounter on the cargo ship Karaboudjan launches The Adventures of Tintin into a "maritime cycle."

A maritime cycle began with The Crab with the Golden Claws in 1940, marked by the encounter with Captain Haddock, and continuing with The Shooting Star, The Secret of the Unicorn, and Red Rackham's Treasure. The sea became the prominent setting for the adventures, reflectiong Hergé’s need to provide the escape for his hero seemed during the German occupation of Belgium in World War II.

During this period, Hergé portrayed ships as significant characters rather than mere boats, such as The Unicorn and the Sirius. The friendship between Tintin and Haddock, forged on the Karaboudjan cargo ship, became pivotal, leading Tintin who previously traveled on passenger ships, to exclusively travel on cargo ships. Hergé again reflected the changing times, as World War II shifted commercial travel from passenger ships to airplanes.

=== The "naval rendezvous of the Red Sea" ===
In 1956, The Red Sea Sharks constituted, according to Yves Horeau, "the culmination of maritime adventure in Hergé's work". In this album, where the sea is omnipresent, the abundance of boats is a true "naval rendezvous of the Red Sea" for the writer. However, this album marks "the true farewell [of] heroes to the high seas," according to the expression of the professor Michel Pierre, since, in the last adventures of the series, Tintin's maritime escapades and walks in port docks are left behind, although the story of Flight 714 to Sydney is set on a Pacific island.

In his work, Hergé explores different aspects of the maritime world. He portrays his hero in luxurious ships as well as in the sinister atmosphere of merchant marine trafficking. Additionally, he evokes adventure, piracy tales, and scientific exploration, all while touching on the disasters closely linked to the maritime imagination.

== Inspiration sources ==
In the mid-1930s, Hergé began to focus more on the realism in his works, conducting extensive research before each adventure. Therefore, most of the elements from industrial arts are perfectly identifiable, as pointed out by literary critic Philippe Goddin.

As the world of the sea and boats is not familiar to the author, he made efforts to enhance his knowledge in this area. Starting in 1935, he subscribed to the marine magazine Wandelaer et sur l'eau and sought guidance from the writer and collector Alexandre Berqueman, for whom he designated the cover of a book titled Belgian Maritime Museums. Moreover, Hergé would occasionally visit the Ten Reuken park in the Brussels suburbs to observe model enthusiasts.

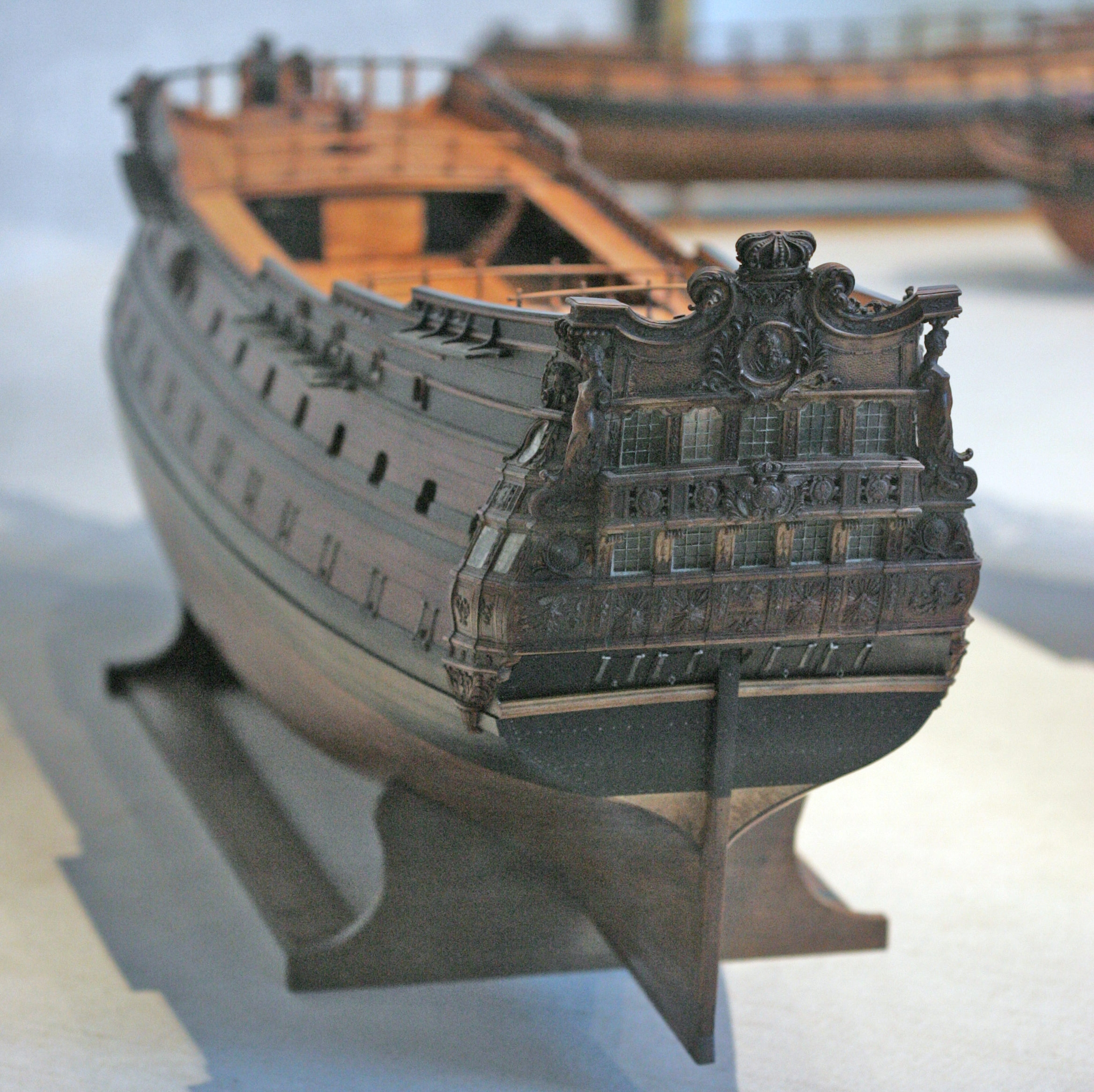
Scale model of Brillant, the vessel in Louis XIV's fleet that inspired the design of La Licorne.

In early 1942, he gathered a wealth of written and iconographic documentation to prepare for writing The Secret of the Unicorn, the eleventh volume of the series. He relied in particular on the model collection of Prince Rodolphe de Croÿ and scale models provided by the Chauveau brothers, antique dealers from Brussels. These documents included numerous sketches of vessels inspired by those of the French Royal Navy, even though Hergé likely never visited the National Maritime Museum in Paris. He also initiated a collaboration with model maker Gérard Liger-Belair, manager of a model shop in Brussels. Hergé commissioned him to create an accurate model of The Unicorn to verify the ship's conformity with his drawings and to realistically represent it from different angles.

During the preparation of The Red Sea Sharks in 1956, Hergé consulted numerous works, including an illustrated edition of Secrets of the Red Sea by Henry de Monfreid, several issues of the Revue maritime, and the book A Submariner of the Royal Navy by Edward Young. He also went in a four-day voyage aboard the cargo ship Reine-Astrid with his assistant Bob de Moor, which travelled between Antwerp and Gothenburg. The photos and sketches taken during this trip were used to draw the sequences where the characters navigate on the Ramona. All the other ships depicted in the album were also drawn from photographs of real models, meticulously documented by Hergé using the research he had accumulated throughout his career.

== Popularity ==
In 1942, alongside the publication of The Secret of the Unicorn, Hergé fulfilled a request from Gérard Liger-Belair to create a model of The Unicorn for sale at his Brussels store, Au petit constructeur (To the little builder). The two men had met in 1938 at Les Scouts, where Liger-Belair served as the secretary. Before the war, he had also sold a balsa wood model of the H.22 Stratonef, featured in Mr. Pump's Legacy, the first story in The Adventures of Jo, Zette and Jocko, another series by Hergé.

In 2011, a new model of The Unicorn was introduced after the release of the film The Adventures of Tintin: The Secret of the Unicorn directed by Steven Spielberg. Designed by Pierre-Henri Le Coz, a shipbuilder from Roscoff, the model was produced in 500 copies at a workshop in Vietnam. That same year, Hachette editions initiated a collection of 110 volumes to assemble the ship model, with each installment containing components of the boat and an accompanying explanatory booklet.

In 1999, an exhibition titled Tintin, Haddock, and the Boats was organized in Saint-Nazaire by the association Les 7 Soleils, led by Jean-Claude Chemin. Yves Horeau created an album for the exhibition, which was reissued in 2021. This exhibition, enriched and expanded, was presented as Mille sabords! in 2001 at the Palais de Chaillot in Paris, at the initiative of the National Maritime Museum and the Hergé Foundation. Subsequently, the exhibition had several presentations abroad, such as in London, Barcelona, Stockholm, and Ostend.

== Boat census ==
The boats featured in The Adventures of Tintin are listed in alphabetical order. Some are depicted only in the original black and white versions of the albums, while others are illustrated in the color editions. Similarly, certain ships are only mentioned by the characters without being visually depicted.

Several small boats depicted by Hergé in various albums are not extensively featured, such as the motorboat seized by the hero in Tintin in the Land of the Soviets, the speedboat he borrowed on Lake Michigan in Tintin in America, the sampan from The Blue Lotus, the pirogue from The Broken Ear, the motorboat purchased to reach The Black Island, the rowboat borrowed to cross the moat of Castle Kropow in King Ottokar's Scepter, the dinghy used by Tintin and Captain Haddock to escape in The Crab with the Golden Claws (inspired by a photograph of survivors from the shipwreck of the SS Georges Philippar in 1932), the motorboat of the Sheherazade in The Red Sea Sharks, which is the same as the one borrowed by Tintin and the captain in The Calculus Affair, or the mini-submarine developed by Professor Calculus to explore the wreck of The Unicorn and featured on the cover of Red Rackham's Treasure.

=== Boats named and illustrated ===
==== A ====
- The Aurora is, in The Shooting Star, the polar ship that carries the scientific expedition of the FERS (European Fund for Scientific Research) in search of a meteorite in the Arctic Ocean. The ship also features a seaplane on board. In an interview with the writer Numa Sadoul, Hergé expressed regret over the drawing of the ship, as it was created without a model or prototype and would not be seaworthy.

==== C ====
- The City of Doodlecastle is a smuggling ship for opium that appears only in the original black and white version of Cigars of the Pharaoh. Its silhouette resembles that of a tugboat. In the color edition, it is replaced by a ship with a completely different appearance: the large motor yacht Sereno.

==== E ====
- The MS Épomeo is an ocean liner on which Tintin embarks on a maritime journey to Shanghai at the start of the album The Cigars of the Pharaoh. It is modeled after The Victoria, a ship launched in 1953 by the Italian company Lloyd Triestino. Measuring 152 meters in length and capable of accommodating 500 passengers, it served the route between Venice and the Far East. The ship's name, selected by Hergé, is inspired by Mount Epomeo, the highest leak on the island of Ischia, located off the coast of Naples.

==== G ====
- The ship used by the pirate Red Rackham, in The Secret of the Unicorn, is a galiot, based on a model found in Hergé's archives. The ship is not named in the album. Its appearance in the Caribbean Sea is uncommon as it was originally a merchant ship in the North Sea during the attack on The Unicorn.

==== H ====
- The Harika Maru, owned by Mitsuhirato in The Blue Lotus, is anchored in the port of Shanghai and used by him to transport opium to Marseille.

==== K ====
- The Kentucky Star, under the orders of the Bohlwinkel bank, attempts to sink the Aurore in The Shooting Star.
- The Karaboudjan is the cargo ship on which Tintin is imprisoned in The Crab with the Golden Claws. He encounters Captain Haddock, the ship's commander, whose authority is undermined by his second-in-command, Allan Thompson, who plies Captain Haddock with whiskey to take control of the ship and use it for smuggling opium in the cargo holds without intereference. The ship is later renamed Djebel Amilah after a staged shipwreck in the Atlantic Ocean, as part of the smugglers attempt to cover their tracks. Essayist Jean-Marie Apostolidès describes the Karaboudjan as "the most rotten place the hero has ever experienced" in his adventures. The origin of the ship's name has various theories. According to Yves Horeau, it is a blend word invented by Hergé from two geographically close place names: Kara-Bougaz, a Turkmen lagoon located east of the Caspian Sea, which is also the title of a novel by Soviet writer Konstantin Paustovsky, and Azerbaijan. Another theory suggests a connection to karabouya (or carabouya), an aniseed and licorice-flavored candy sold in Belgian markets. The ship's appearance, while docked in the harbor, is based on a photograph of the Glengarry, a Scottish ship from Glasgow. Cartoonist Riad Sattouf pays homage to the Karaboudjan by featuring it in the third volume of his series The Arab of the Future, released in 2016.

==== L ====
- The Leopoldville is an ocean liner built in 1928 in Hoboken by the Cockerill company and owned by the Belgian Maritime Company. Converted in 1937, it operated the route between Antwerp and Belgian Congo. In 1946, Hergé reproduced a photo of this ship without naming it in the coloring of Tintin in the Congo. According to Yves Horeau, this may have been a tribute to the ship, which was torpedoed by a German submarine on Christmas Eve two years earlier while carrying over 2,000 American soldiers during the Southampton-Cherbourg crossing.

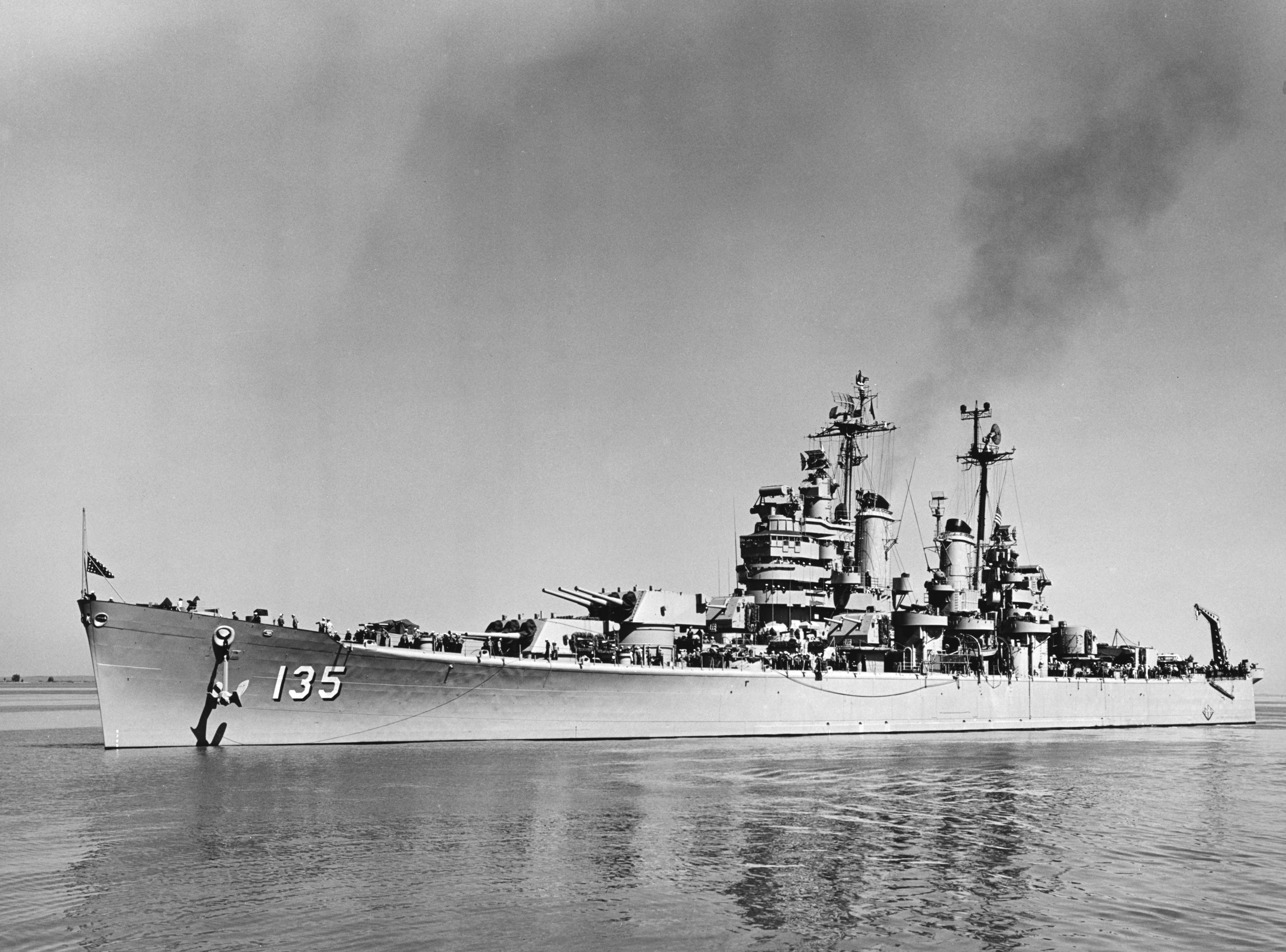
USS Los Angeles (CA-135) in 1952.

- The USS Los Angeles (CA-135), featured in The Red Sea Sharks, is an American heavy cruiser constructed in Philadelphia and launched in August 1944. This Baltimore-class vessel was commissioned into the US Navy towards the World War II conclusion.

==== N ====
- The Normandie, the largest ocean liner in the world and a source of pride for France in the 1930s, is subtly depicted twice in Tintin comics. It is first shown in the black and white version of The Broken Ear, and later in the colored version of Tintin in America after the war, despite the ship's destruction in 1942. In the first version of The Broken Ear, the Normandie allows Tintin to return to Europe at the end of the adventure. Similarly, in Tintin in America, Tintin gazes at the New York skyline from the ship's deck. In the 1992 television series The Adventures of Tintin, a poster reminiscent of Cassandre's work is displayed in Tintin's cabin aboard The Scheherazade.

==== P ====
- The Pachacamac is a Peruvian cargo ship featured in The Seven Crystal Balls and Prisoners of the Sun. It operates between Callao and La Rochell, transporting wood and guano. Professor Calculus is held captive on board. The ship's name is derived from a pre-Columbian creator god and an archaeological site near Lima. It was based on the SS Égypte, a ship for which Hergé obtained plans and visited. Constructed in 1946 by the Jos Boel & Sons shipyards in Tamise, it was part of the German war program to convert merchant ships into auxiliary cruisers known as "Hansa-Bauprogramm." The same vessel later served as a model for The Ramona in The Red Sea Sharks.

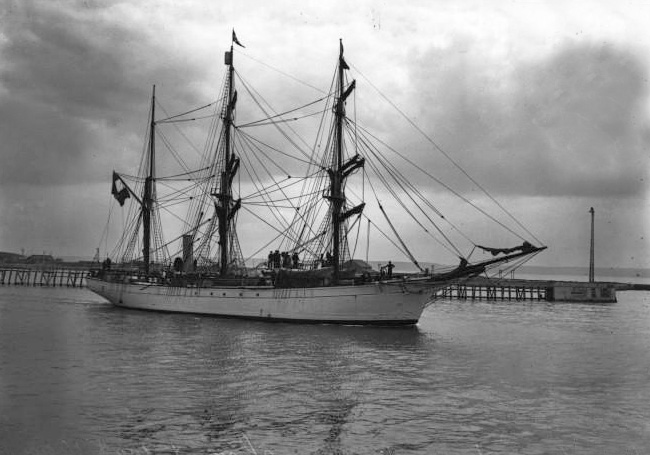
The Pourquoi Pas serves as a model for the Peary.

- In The Shooting Star, the Peary is the rival ship of the Aurore in a race towards a meteorite. It is chartered by a bank from the state of Sao Rico and led by a certain Bohlwinkel. The ship is named after the American explorer Robert Peary, known for his expeditions across Greenland and in search of the North Pole, where competed with Frederick Cook. According to Yves Horeau and Jacques Hiron, the design of the Peary is based on the Pourquoi-Pas, the polar exploration vessel of Commander Jean-Baptiste Charcot, which sank in 1936 off the coast of Iceland, a photograph included in Hergé's personal archives.
- The Prince Baudouin, named after the young Belgian prince, is a ferry that connects Ostend to Dover. Tintin takes this ferry to reach England in The Black Island. The boat is depicted and mentioned in the first black and white edition, but is only identified in the color edition.

==== R ====
- In The Red Sea Sharks, the Ramona is the cargo ship commanded by Allan Thompson and owned by the Marquis di Gorgonzola. Its purpose was to transport black African slaves to Arabia. Captain Haddock assumes command after Allan and his crew abandon the ship due to a fire. The Ramona is based on the SS Égypte and the cargo ship Reine-Astrid, which sailed between Antwerp and Gothenburg. Hergé and Bob de Moor spent four days aboard the Reine-Astrid in August 1956.

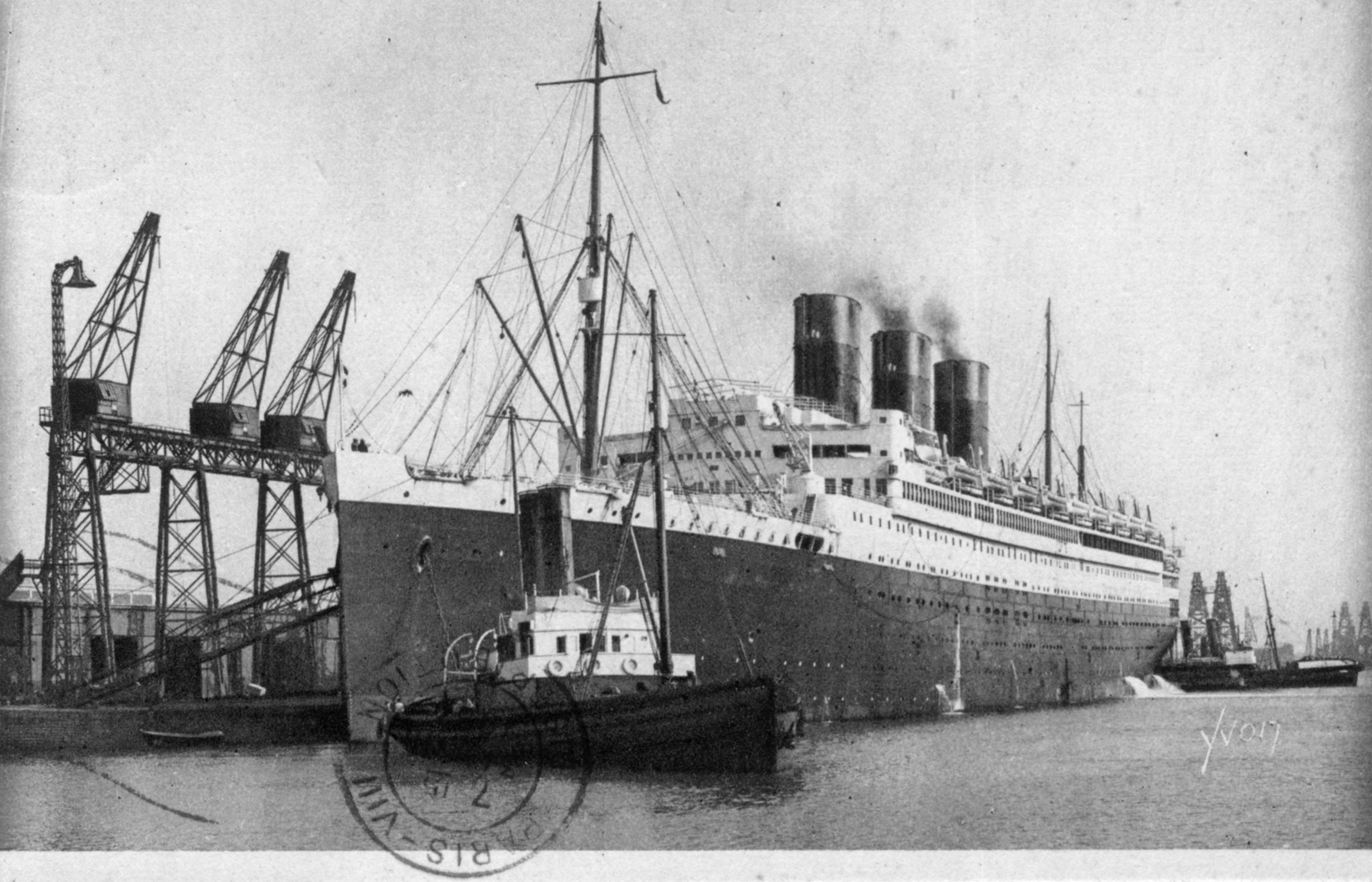
The Paris transatlantic.

- The SS Ranchi, an English ocean liner launched in 1925, is the ship on which Tintin boards to depart from Shanghai to Mumbai in The Blue Lotus. However, he is kidnapped and taken back to China by the secret society of the Sons of the Dragon. The ship is named after a city in India and its design is inspired by the SS Paris, which was launched in 1921.
- The Ranpura is the ocean liner that Tintin takes at the end of The Blue Lotus to return to Europe. It is named in the original black and white version and only depicted in the color version. Hergé likely used several models to design it: Michael Farr notes a resemblance to the Vaterland, while Jean-Marie Embs and Philippe Mellot associate it with several photographs showing the Cap Polonio, another ocean liner of the Hamburg America Line.
- The Requin is the code name of a pirate submarine commanded by Kurt and under the orders of Marquis di Gorgonzola in The Red Sea Sharks. It is a Type VII submarine from 1939, a most commonly used model by the Kriegsmarine during World War II. One of its frogman, a combat swimmer tasked with planting a mine on the Ramona's hull, is inspired by a real person: Lionel Crabb, a Royal Navy and Secret Intelligence Service agent. His photograph was used as the cover for the book The Frogmen by German writer Cajus Bekker in 1955. Hergé used this image to accurately depict the swimmer's equipment.

==== S ====
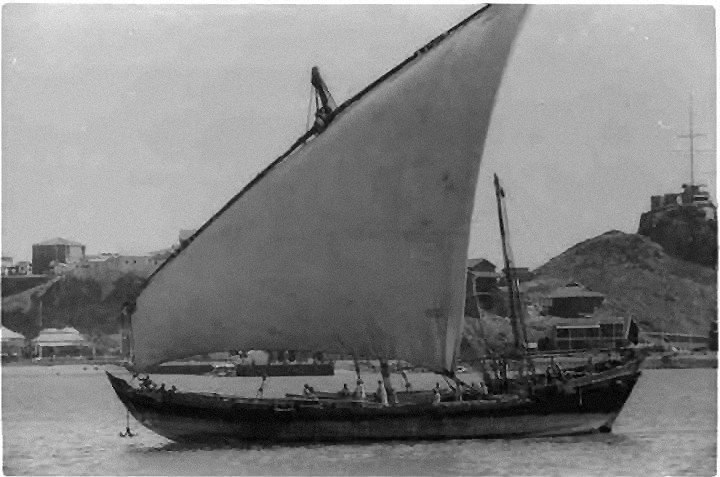
A sambuk in the Gulf of Aden in 1936.

- In The Red Sea Sharks, two sambuks are portrayed. These two-masted sailing vessels with triangular sails are part of the dhow family, originating from the Red Sea and common in the Arabian Peninsula.
- The Sereno is a motor yacht owned by Allan Thompson in Cigars of the Pharaoh. Used for smuggling, it briefly carries the sarcophagi containing Tintin, Snowy, and Professor Siclone. Three ship models may have inspired it. The first model is a large yacht, the MV Savarona, with its bow faithfully reproduced in the drawing, albeit at half scale. However, the dimensions of the Savarona exceed those of the Sereno, which are precisely half the size. Therefore, the drawing corresponds to the second source model, the yacht Gunilda from 1897, with a bow and figurehead that closely resemble those of the Sereno. The dimensions and overall appearance of the Sereno match those of the Gunilda. The third potential inspiration for the Sereno is the Italian gunboat Aurora, which matches in size and appearance, although Hergé did not retain the black color of the Aurora's hull for the Sereno.
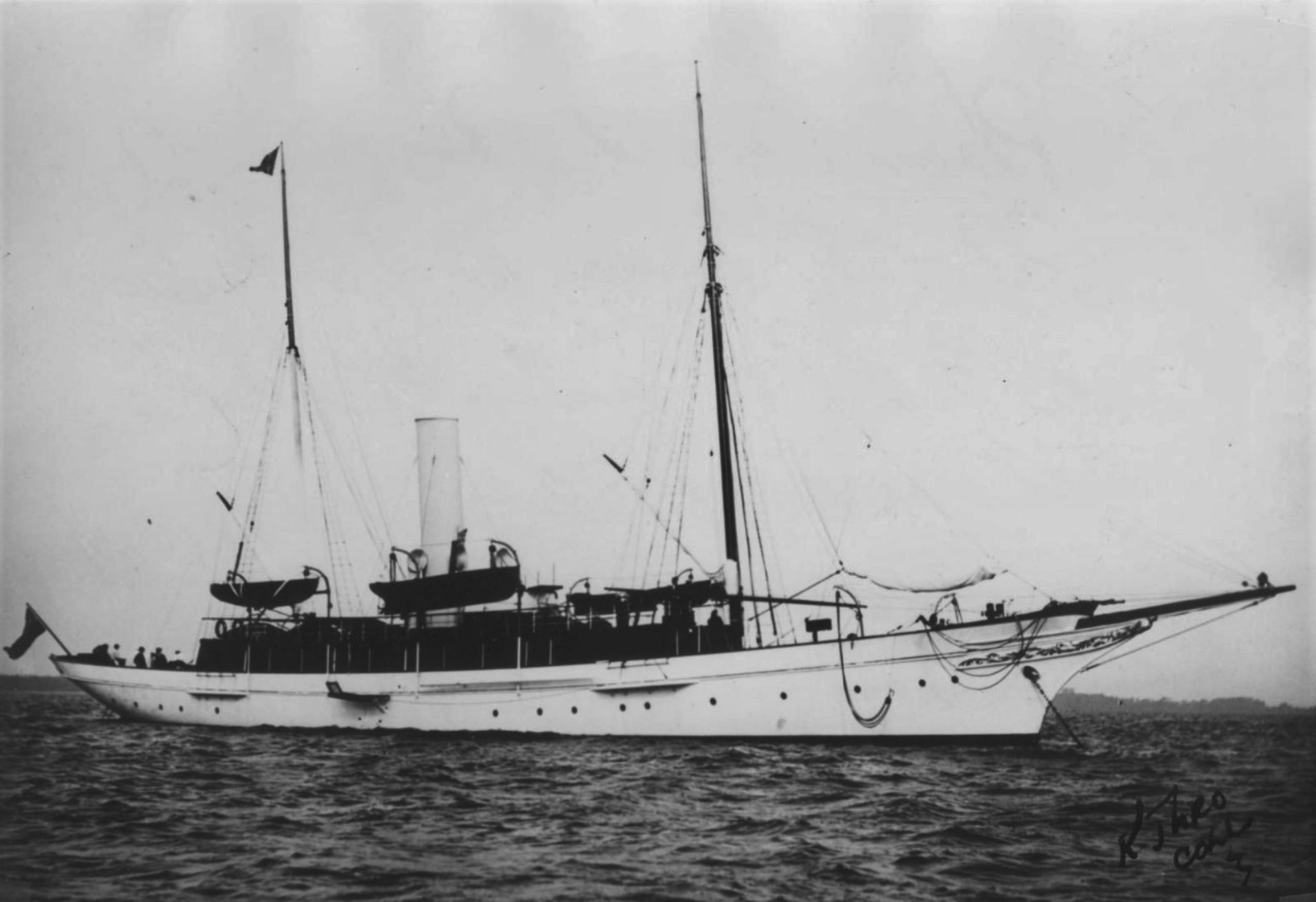
  Gunilda 6
- The Sirius (1) is a trawler owned by Captain Chester, a friend of Captain Haddock. It is briefly seen in The Shooting Star, and Captain Chester lends it to Haddock when he embarks on a quest for the treasure of Red Rackham's Treasure. It is a replica of the trawler John-O.88, constructed at the Jos Boel et Fils shipyards in Tamise and put into service in Ostend during the 1930s. The collector Alexandre Berqueman, a friend of Hergé, provided the manufacturer's blueprints to the cartoonist to ensure accuracy in the depiction.

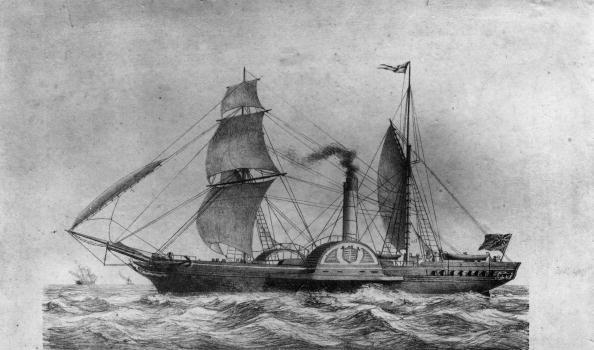
The Sirius around 1838.

- The Sirius (2), featured in a painting in Captain Haddock's apartment in The Secret of the Unicorn, is the first steam transatlantic ship to cross the Atlantic in 1838.
- In Land of Black Gold, the oil tanker Speedol Star is depicted as operating between Europe and the Middle East. Tintin, along with the Thomson and Thompson twins, boards this vessel to travel to Khemed. The ship's design was revised multiple times, with the 1971 edition featuring sketches by Bob de Moor based on a tanker from 1939 docked in the port of Antwerp.
- In The Red Sea Sharks, the luxury yacht Scheherazade, owned by Marquis di Gorgonzola (Rastapopoulos) rescues Tintin, Captain Haddock, and Szut from on a raft. The yacht's speedboathides a pocket submarine, quirky device Rastapopoulos uses to vanish.

==== T ====
- The Thysville is the ocean liner that Tintin uses to reach Africa in the first black and white version of Tintin in the Congo. It is a mixed cargo ship with two propellers built in 1922 in Hoboken, and named after a city in the Belgian Congo colony.

==== U ====
- The Unicorn is a three-masted ship commanded by Sir Francis Haddock, an ancestor of Captain Haddock in the service of the French Royal Navy of Louis XIV. Its story is depicted in The Secret of the Unicorn, where Tintin and Captain Haddock organize an expedition to locate its shipwreck in Red Rackham's Treasure. Hergé used Prince Rodolphe de Croÿ’s model collection and plans of a second-rate ship of the French Royal Navy, the Brillant, to design its general appearance. Moreover, Gérard Liger-Belair assisted in building a model to ensure accuracy and faithful representation of the ship. Its name may have been inspired by Rue de la Licorne, near Jacques Van Melkebeke’s home, who aided Hergé in writing the script, a Brussels bookstore turned art gallery selling boat models, or a ship in Jules Verne's novel The Castaways of the Flag.

==== V ====
- The Ville de Lyon is a transatlantic liner that Tintin takes to travel from Le Havre to San Theodoros in The Broken Ear.

==== W ====
- The Washington is an ocean liner that operates between Europe and North America in The Broken Ear. It is on this ship that Tintin finally retrieves the fetish stolen from the Brussels Ethnographic Museum.

=== Boats mentioned but not depicted ===
- The Benares is a steamboat that attempted to rescue the Karaboudjan in The Crab with the Golden Claws.
- The Black Cat is a ship loading at the port of La Rochelle in The Seven Crystal Balls.
- The Blackstar, the Cervin, and the Saturne are three boats used by Mitsuhirato in The Blue Lotus to transport opium to Europe. The first is bound for Rotterdam, the second for Hamburg, and the third for Liverpool.
- The Golden Oil, in The Shooting Star, is an oil tanker from the homonymous company that refuels the Sirius in the port of Akureyri, Iceland.
- The cargo ship Jupiter and the steamer Tanganyika are two vessels that, according to the radio, sank during a storm off the coast of Vigo in The Crab with the Golden Claws.
- The Titanic is referenced twice in the series. The first is in Red Rackham's Treasure when Captain Haddock shows Professor Tournesol the figurehead of Unicorn. The second mention is in Land of Black Gold, on the hat of the Thomson and Thompson twins when they embark on the Speedol Star.
- The Valmy is the cargo ship commanded by Captain Chester in The Seven Crystal Balls. It frequently visits the port of La Rochelle.
- The Vilnaranda is a fictional distressed ship created by Tintin's rivals to hinder his expedition progress in The Shooting Star. During his investigation of the alleged shipwreck, Tintin receives reports from various vessels confirming their well-being: the Vilhelmina, the Villafranca di Verona, the Villang... (incomplete name), the Villaverde, the Ville de Lyon, the Ville de Nantes, the Ville de Rouen, the Ville de St-Nazaire, and the Ville de Toulon. The Ville de Rouen is also mentioned in the first edition of The Blue Lotus as owned by Mitsuhirato and intended for opium delivery to the port of Le Havre.

== See also ==
=== Related articles ===
- Unicorn
- The Adventures of Tintin
- List of The Adventures of Tintin characters
- List of fictional ships

=== Bibliography ===
- Apostolidès, Jean-Marie (2006). Les Métamorphoses de Tintin. Champs (in French). Paris: Flammarion. ISBN 978-2-08-124907-3.
- Assouline, Pierre (1996). Hergé. Folio (in French). Paris: Gallimard. ISBN 978-2-07-040235-9.
- Horeau, Yves (2021). Tintin, Haddock et les bateaux (in French). Editions Moulinsart. ISBN 978-2-87424-516-9.
- Langlois, Jacques (dir.) (2014). Tintin et la mer (in French). Historia, Ouest-France.
- Peeters, Benoît (2006). Hergé, fils de Tintin. Champs biographie (in French). Paris: Flammarion. ISBN 978-2-08-126789-3.
