= The Secret of the Unicorn =

Comic album by Belgian cartoonist Hergé

The Secret of the Unicorn (Le Secret de La Licorne)
- Cover of the English edition
- Date: 1943
- Series: The Adventures of Tintin
- Publisher: Casterman

Creative team
- Creator: Hergé

Original publication
- Published in: Le Soir
- Date of publication: 11 June 1942 – 14 January 1943
- Language: French

Translation
- Publisher: Methuen
- Date: 1959
- Translator: Leslie Lonsdale-Cooper; Michael Turner

Chronology
- Preceded by: The Shooting Star (1942)
- Followed by: Red Rackham's Treasure (1944)

The Secret of the Unicorn (French: Le Secret de La Licorne) is the eleventh volume of The Adventures of Tintin, the comics series by Belgian cartoonist Hergé. The story was serialised daily in Le Soir, Belgium's leading francophone newspaper, from June 1942 to January 1943 amidst the Nazi German occupation of Belgium during World War II. The story revolves around young reporter Tintin, his dog Snowy, and his friend Captain Haddock, who discover a riddle left by Haddock's ancestor, the 17th century Sir Francis Haddock, which can lead them to the hidden treasure of the pirate Red Rackham. To unravel the riddle, Tintin and Haddock must obtain three identical models of Sir Francis's ship, the Unicorn, but they discover that criminals are also after three model ships and are willing to kill in order to obtain them.

The Secret of the Unicorn was a commercial success and was published in book form by Casterman shortly after its conclusion. Hergé concluded the arc begun in this story with Red Rackham's Treasure, while the series itself became a defining part of the Franco-Belgian comics tradition. The Secret of the Unicorn remained Hergé's favourite of his own works until creating Tintin in Tibet (1960). The story was adapted for the 1957 Belvision animated series Hergé's Adventures of Tintin, the 1991 Ellipse/Nelvana animated series The Adventures of Tintin, the 1992-3 BBC Radio 5 dramatisation of the Adventures, the feature film The Adventures of Tintin (2011) directed by Steven Spielberg, and the film's tie-in video game.

== Synopsis ==
While browsing on the Brussels Voddenmarkt/Marché aux puces at the Vossenplein in the Marollen, Tintin purchases an antique model ship which he intends to give to his friend, Captain Haddock. Two strangers, model ship collector Ivan Ivanovitch Sakharine and antique-scout Barnaby, independently try and fail to persuade Tintin to sell the model to them. Tintin also meets detectives Thomson and Thompson on a secret mission looking out for a pickpocket; however, both their wallets are repeatedly stolen throughout the story. At Tintin's flat, Snowy accidentally knocks the model over and breaks its mainmast. Having shown the ship to Haddock, Tintin discovers that the ship is named the Unicorn, after a ship commanded by Haddock's own ancestor.

While Tintin is out, the ship is stolen from his apartment; in the following investigation, he discovers that Sakharine owns an identical model, also named the Unicorn. At home, Tintin discovers a miniature scroll, and realises that it must have been hidden inside the mast of the model. Written on the parchment is a riddle: "Three brothers joined. Three Unicorns in company sailing in the noonday sunne will speak. For 'tis from the light that light will dawn, and then shines forth the Eagle's cross". Captain Haddock vividly recounts the tale of the Unicorn, a 17th-century warship captained by his ancestor, Sir Francis Haddock, but seized by a pirate band led by Red Rackham. In a retold flashback, it is shown how Francis' ship is attacked by Red Rackham and his crew. At first the pirates raise the black Jolly Roger, indicating that quarter (safe conduct) is offered in exchange for peaceful surrender, but when Francis refuses to strike his flag and bombards the pirates with cannon fire, the pirates instead "hoists fresh colors" and raise the "red pennant" (a bloody flag, French: pavillon sans quartier), signaling no quarter (no mercy, no prisoners), after which they board Francis' ship and massacre his crew. The only one of his crew to survive the boarding, Sir Francis killed Red Rackham in single combat and scuttled the Unicorn; he later built three models, which he left to his sons.

Tintin deduces that each of the models contains a scroll, which united lead to the location of Red Rackham's treasure. Tintin and Haddock try to get the three scrolls, but they are out of luck: Tintin's wallet (with the first scroll) is stolen, while Sakharine is found drugged, and the scroll inside his own Unicorn missing. Meanwhile, Barnaby requests a meeting with Tintin, but is gunned down on Tintin's doorstep before he can speak, and points to sparrows as a cryptic clue to the identity of his assailant before falling unconscious. A few days later, Tintin is kidnapped and chloroformed by the perpetrators of the shooting: the Bird brothers, two unscrupulous antique dealers who own the third model of the Unicorn. They are behind the theft of Tintin's model and have also stolen Sakharine's parchment, knowing that only by possessing all three parchments can the location of Red Rackham's treasure be found.

Tintin escapes from the cellars of the Bird brothers' country estate, Marlinspike Hall, while the Captain arrives with Thomson and Thompson to arrest them. It is revealed that the Bird Brothers have only one of the parchments, as two were lost when their wallet was stolen. It is also revealed that Barnaby survived and has made a full recovery, much to Max Bird's enragement. The Bird brothers are arrested. Tintin and Thomson and Thompson track down the pickpocket, Aristides Silk, a kleptomaniac who has a penchant for collecting wallets, and obtain the Bird Brothers' wallet, containing the missing two parchments. By combining the three parchments and holding them to light, Tintin and Haddock discover the coordinates (20°37'42.0" N 70°52'15.0" W, 82 km north of the Dominican Republic) of the lost treasure and plan an expedition to find it.

== History ==
=== Background ===
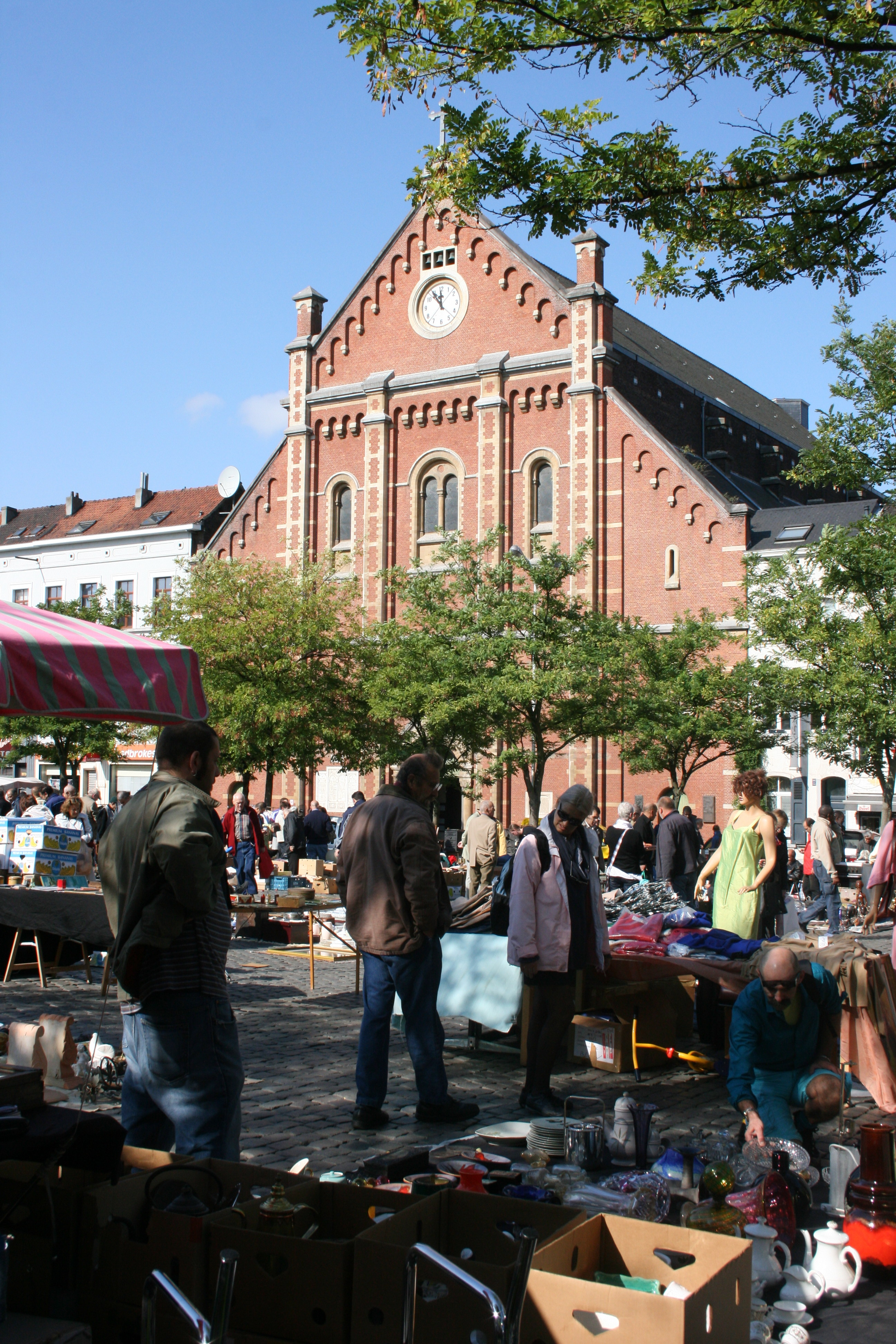
The flea market at the Place du Jeu de Balle in Brussels where Tintin buys the model ship

The Secret of the Unicorn was serialized amidst the German occupation of Belgium during World War II. Hergé had accepted a position working for Le Soir, Belgium's largest Francophone daily newspaper. Confiscated from its original owners, the German authorities permitted Le Soir to reopen under the directorship of Belgian editor Raymond de Becker, although it remained firmly under Nazi control, supporting the German war effort and espousing anti-Semitism. After joining Le Soir on 15 October 1940, Hergé became editor of its new children's supplement Le Soir Jeunesse, with assistance by old friend Paul Jamin and cartoonist Jacques Van Melkebeke, before paper shortages forced The Adventures of Tintin to be serialised daily in the main pages of Le Soir. Some Belgians were upset that Hergé was willing to work for a newspaper controlled by the occupying Nazi administration, although he was heavily enticed by the size of Le Soir's readership, which reached 600,000. Faced with the reality of Nazi oversight, Hergé abandoned the overt political themes that had pervaded much of his earlier work, instead adopting a policy of neutrality. Without the need to satirise political types, entertainment producer and author Harry Thompson observed that "Hergé was now concentrating more on plot and on developing a new style of character comedy. The public reacted positively".

The Secret of the Unicorn was the first of The Adventures of Tintin which Hergé had collaborated on with Van Melkebeke to a significant degree; biographer Benoît Peeters suggested that Van Melkebeke should rightly be considered the story's "co-scriptwriter". It was Hergé's discussions with Van Melkebeke that led him to craft a more complex story than he had in prior Adventures. Van Melkebeke had been strongly influenced by the adventure novels of writers like Jules Verne and Paul d'Ivoi, and this influence is apparent throughout the story. The inclusion of three hidden scrolls has parallels with Verne's 1867 story, The Children of Captain Grant, which Van Melkebeke had recommended to Hergé. Hergé acknowledged Van Melkebeke's contribution by including a cameo of him within the market scene at the start of the story; this was particularly apt as Van Melkebeke had purchased his books in Brussels' Old Market as a child.

The Secret of the Unicorn was the first half of a two-part story arc that was concluded in the following adventure, Red Rackham's Treasure. This arc was the first that Hergé had utilised since Cigars of the Pharaoh and The Blue Lotus (1934–36). However, as Tintin expert Michael Farr related, whereas Cigars of the Pharaoh and The Blue Lotus had been largely "self-sufficient and self-contained", the connection between The Secret of the Unicorn and Red Rackham's Treasure is far closer.

Hergé's illustration of Sir Francis Haddock fighting Red Rackham's pirates

In previous works, Hergé had drawn upon a variety of pictorial sources, such as newspaper clippings, from which to draw the scenes and characters; for The Secret of the Unicorn he drew upon an unprecedented variety of these sources. In drawing many of the old vessels, Hergé initially consulted the then recently published L'Art et la Mer ("Art and the Sea") by Alexandre Berqueman. Seeking further accurate depictions of old naval vessels, Hergé consulted his friend Gérard Liger-Belair, who owned a Brussels shop specialising in model ships. Liger-Belair produced plans of a 17th-century French fifty-gun warship for Hergé to copy; Le Brillant, which had been constructed in Le Havre in 1690 by the shipwright Salicon and then decorated by Jean Bérain the Elder.

He also studied other vessels from the period, such as the Le Soleil Royal, La Couronne, La Royale and Le Reale de France, to better understand 17th-century ship design. It was from the Le Reale de France that he gained a basis for his design of the Unicorn's jolly boat. No ship named the Unicorn was listed in the annals of the French Navy, but Hergé instead took the name from a British frigate which had been active in the mid-18th century; the fictional ship's unicorn figurehead was also adopted from the frigate.

The character of Red Rackham was partly inspired by John Rackham, a pirate who appeared in a story alongside female pirates Anne Bonny and Mary Read that Hergé encountered in a November 1938 edition of Dimanche-Illustré. Red Rackham's looks and costumes were also inspired by the character Lerouge, who appears in C. S. Forester's novel, The Captain from Connecticut, and by the 17th-century French buccaneer Daniel Montbars. The name of Marlinspike Hall—Moulinsart in French—was based upon the name of the real Belgian town, Sart-Moulin. The actual design of the building was based upon the Château de Cheverny, albeit with the two outer wings removed. In introducing Sir Francis Haddock to the story, Hergé made Captain Haddock the only character in the series (except Jolyon Wagg, introduced later) to have a family and an ancestry. The story included hints that Francis Haddock is the illegitimate son of the French Sun King, Louis XIV, possibly as a reference to Hergé's belief that his father was the illegitimate son of the Belgian king Leopold II. The Secret of the Unicorn was set entirely in Belgium and was the last Adventure to be set there until The Castafiore Emerald. It would also be Hergé's favourite story until Tintin in Tibet. The final two pages of the adventure mark the first appearance of Tintin's iconic costume of a white shirt under a blue sweater; having worn a variety of outfits in previous volumes, notably a brown suit and a yellow shirt with a red tie, he would don this attire in all subsequent books. In the final panel, Tintin breaks the fourth wall. It is the only instance of this effect in the entire series.

=== Historical parallels ===
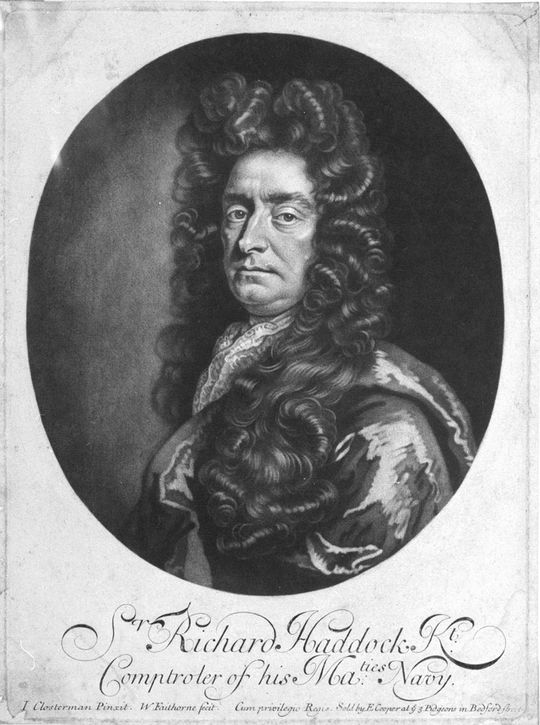
A 17th-century engraving of Sir Richard Haddock

After publishing the book, Hergé learned that there had actually been an Admiral Haddock who had served in the British Royal Navy during the late 17th and early 18th centuries: Sir Richard Haddock (1629–1715). Richard Haddock was in charge of the Royal James, the flagship of the Earl of Sandwich during the Battle of Solebay of 1672, the first naval battle of the Third Anglo-Dutch War. During the fighting, the Royal James was set alight and Haddock escaped but had to be rescued from the sea, following which his bravery was recognised by the British monarch, King Charles II. He subsequently took command of another ship, the Royal Charles, before becoming a naval administrator in later life. Admiral Haddock's grandfather, also named Richard, commanded the ship of the line English ship Unicorn during the reign of King Charles I.

Another individual known as Captain Haddock had lived in this period, who had commanded a fire ship, the Anne and Christopher. It was recorded by David Ogg that this captain and his ship had been separated from their squadron whilst out at sea and so docked at Málaga to purchase goods that could be taken back to Britain and sold for a profit. For this action, Haddock was brought before an admiralty tribunal in 1674, where he was ordered to forfeit all profits from the transaction and suspended from his command for six months.

=== The Unicorn ===
By 1942, Hergé had decided that his latest Tintin adventure should depict images of his fictional Unicorn as detailed precision drawings. He used the services of his friend and local model ship maker Gérard Liger-Belair, son of a former naval officer and who owned a shop in Brussels that specialised in model ships, (Note: Hergé had enjoyed Scouting as a youth and knew Gérard Liger-Belair as secretary of the Federation of Catholic Scouts.) to find an appropriate historical vessel that he could customize to meet his historical needs. Liger-Belair's research produced three possibilities: A British frigate, a Dutch merchant ship and a French ship of the line. As Hergé preferred the ship of the line, Liger-Belair continued to research and discovered a historic document titled Architectura Navalis, which contained detailed drawings of French ships of the line. One in particular was from 1690, in the navy of Louis XIV, the 64-gun Brillant, built in 1690 at Le Havre, France by the shipwright Salicon and then decorated by the designer Jean Bérain the Elder. Hergé decided this ship would be his Unicorn, and soon Liger-Belair completed a plan on a 1:100 scale, followed by an extremely precise model. (Note: The plans for the ship, along with other information, was published in an article of the June 1989 issue of Amis de Hergé magazine.)

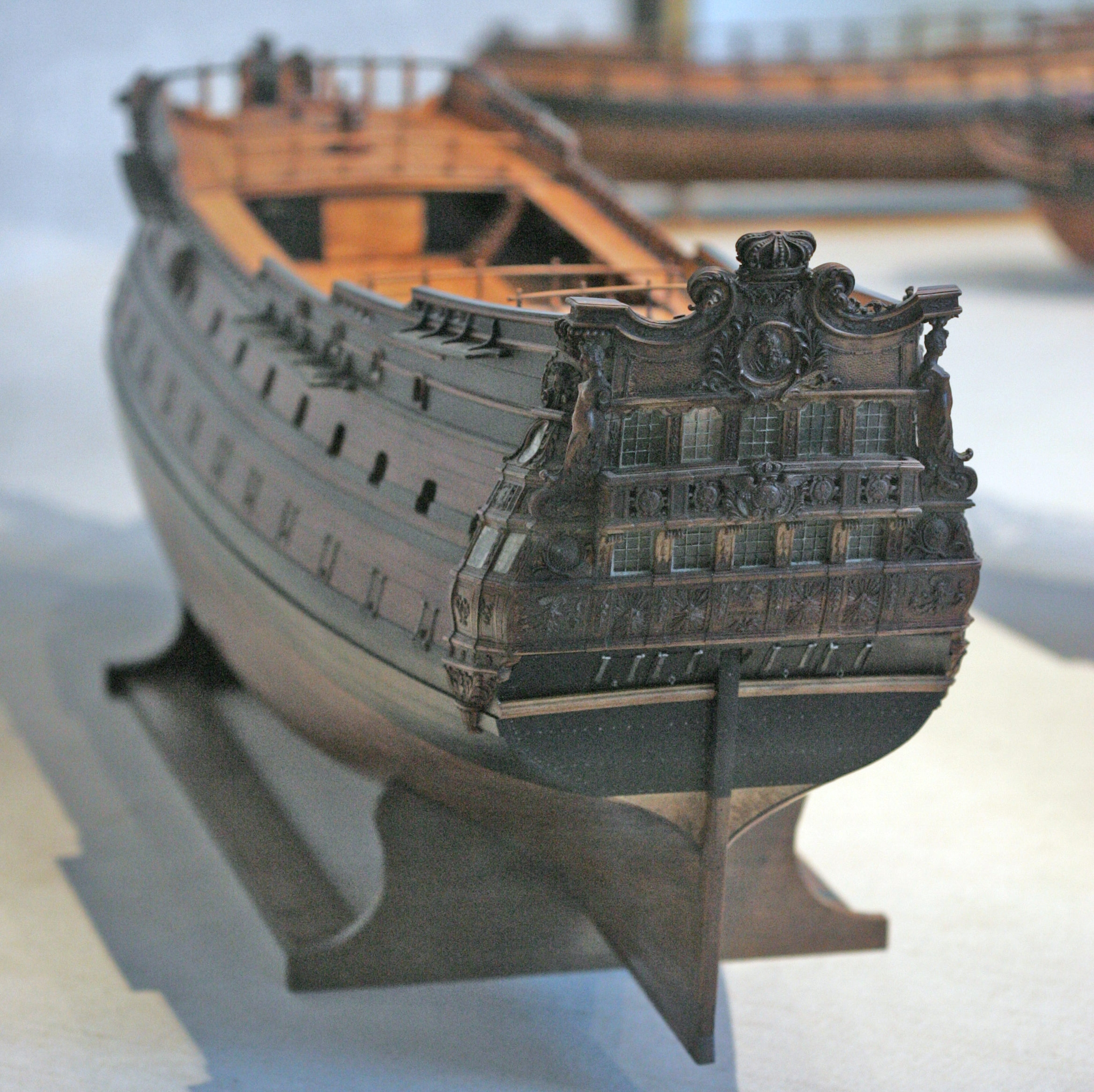
Model of Brillant, the ship of the line of Louis XIV's fleet that inspired Hergé to draw the Unicorn

Meanwhile, Hergé had been consulting the archives at the National Museum of Natural History and the then recently published L'Art et le Mer ("Art and the Sea") by Alexandre Berqueman. He also studied other vessels from the period, such as the Le Soleil Royal, La Couronne, La Royale and Le Reale de France to better understand 17th-century ship design. It was from the Le Reale de France that he gained a basis for his design of the Unicorn's jolly boat. Hergé ultimately adopted his unicorn figurehead from a British frigate which had been built in 1745. When Liger-Belair's model was complete, Hergé realised it into the panels of his comics, regularly showing his renditions to Liger-Belair to ensure he was depicting the vessel with no technical errors. In its finished appearance in the book, the Unicorn is a ship of the third rank, a vessel with three-masts and 50 guns, more than 40 metres long and 11 metres wide.

After publication of The Secret of the Unicorn, Hergé's German publisher Carlsen Verlag gave him an antique model that he had acquired of a 17th-century Danish ship called the Enhjørningen (The Unicorn). Until that moment, Hergé had no idea that a ship with that name, complete with a unicorn figurehead, had ever actually existed.

=== Publication ===
Le Secret de La Licorne began serialisation as a daily strip in newspaper Le Soir from 11 June 1942. As with previous adventures, it then began serialisation in the French Catholic newspaper Cœurs Vaillants, from 19 March 1944. In Belgium, it was then published in a 62-page book format by Editions Casterman in 1943. Now fully coloured, the book included a new cover design created by Hergé after he had completed the original serialisation of the story, along with six large colour drawings. The first printing sold 30,000 copies in Francophone Belgium.

The Secret of the Unicorn and Red Rackham's Treasure were the first two Adventures of Tintin to be published in standalone English-language translations for the British market, as King Ottokar's Sceptre had previously been serialised in Eagle in 1951. Published by Casterman in 1952, these two editions sold poorly and have since become rare collector's items. Both stories would be republished for the British market seven years later, this time by Methuen with new translations provided by Michael Turner and Leslie Lonsdale-Cooper. In the English translation, the letters sent to Marlinspike reveal that the estate is in England rather than Belgium. Thomson and Thompson find their stolen wallets in the thief's alphabetical files before the E section, reflecting their original names Dupont and Dupond. Sir Francis Haddock is described as having served the English monarch Charles II, in contrast to the original French version, in which he serves French king Louis XIV, and the Unicorn's flag is changed accordingly.

The series' Danish publishers, Carlsen, later located a model of an early-17th-century Danish ship called Enhjørningen (The Unicorn) which they gave to Hergé. Constructed in 1605, Enhjørningen had been wrecked in explorer Jens Munk's 1619–20 attempt to navigate the Northwest Passage.

== Critical analysis ==
The Secret of the Unicorn resembled the earlier Adventures of Tintin in its use of style, colour and content, leading Harry Thompson to remark that it "unquestionably" belongs to the 1930s, considering it to be "the last and best of Hergé's detective mysteries". He asserted that this story and Red Rackham's Treasure marked the third and central stage of "Tintin's career", also stating that here, Tintin has been converted from a reporter into an explorer to cope with the new political climate. He further added his opinion that it was "the most successful of all Tintin's adventures". Jean-Marc Lofficier and Randy Lofficier asserted that Sir Francis Haddock was "the best realised character" in the story, conversely describing the Bird Brothers as "relatively uninspired villains". They went on to state that The Secret of the Unicorn-Red Rackham's Treasure arc represents "a turning point" for the series as it shifts the reader's attention from Tintin to Haddock, who has become "by far, the most interesting character". They praised the "truly outstanding storytelling" of The Secret of the Unicorn, ultimately awarding it a rating of four out of five.

Phillipe Goddin commented on the scene in the story in which Haddock relates the life of his ancestor, stating that the reader is "alternately projected into the present and the past with staggering mastery. Periods interlocked, enriched one another, were amplified and married in a stunning fluidity. Hergé was at the height of his powers".

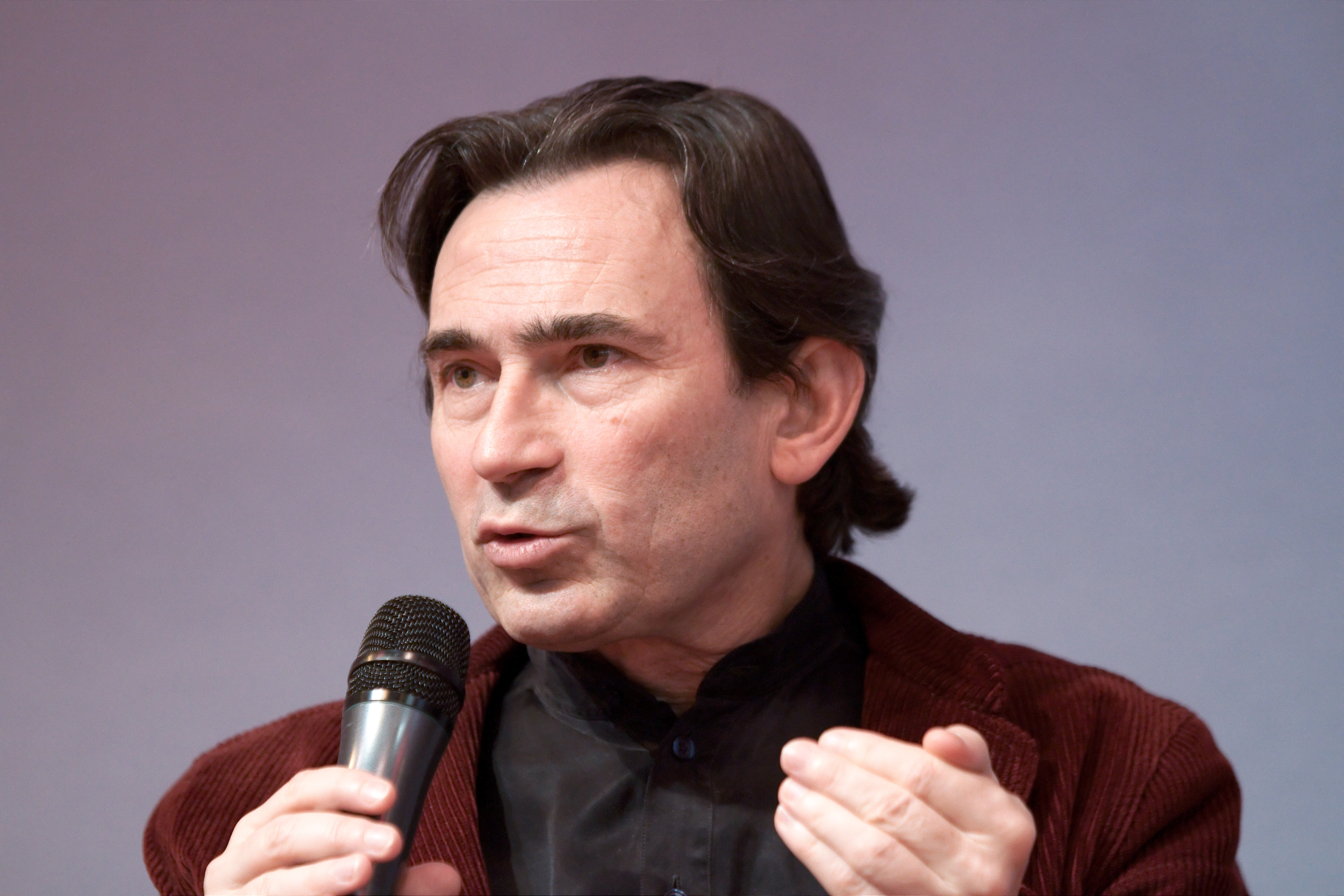
Hergé biographer Benoît Peeters considered The Secret of the Unicorn to be one of Hergé's "greatest narrative successes".

Hergé biographer Benoît Peeters asserted that both The Secret of the Unicorn and Red Rackham's Treasure "hold a crucial position" in The Adventures of Tintin as they establish the "Tintin universe" with its core set of characters. Focusing on the former comic, he described it as one of Hergé's "greatest narrative successes" through the manner in which it interweaves three separate plots. He felt that while religious elements had been present in previous stories, they were even stronger in The Secret of the Unicorn and its sequel, something which he attributed to Van Melkebeke's influence. Elsewhere he asserted that it "explores this prelude with extraordinary narrative virtuosity".

Biographer Pierre Assouline stated that the story was "clearly influenced ... in spirit if not in detail" by Robert Louis Stevenson's book, Treasure Island in that it "seemed to cater to a need for escapism". He described the adventure as "a new development in Hergé's work, a flight from the topical to epics of pirate adventures set in distant horizons". Assouline also expressed the view that the ancestral figure of Sir Francis Haddock reflected Hergé's attempt to incorporate one of his own family secrets, that he had an aristocratic ancestor, into the story.

Michael Farr believed that the "most remarkable" factor of the book was its introduction of Sir Francis Haddock, highlighting that in his mannerisms and visual depiction, he is "scarcely distinguishable" from Captain Haddock. He also highlighted that the scenes in which Captain Haddock relates the tale of his ancestor carries on the "merging of dreams and reality" that Hergé had "experimented with" in The Crab with the Golden Claws and The Shooting Star. Noting that unlike The Shooting Star, this two-book story arc contains "scarcely an allusion to occupation and war", he praised the arc's narrative as "perfectly paced, without that feeling of haste" present in some of Hergé's earlier work.

In his psychoanalytical study of the Adventures of Tintin, the academic Jean-Marie Apostolidès characterised the Secret of the Unicorn-Red Rackham's Treasure arc as being about the characters going on a "treasure hunt that turns out to be at the same time a search for their roots". He stated that the arc delves into Haddock's ancestry, and in doing so "deals with the meanings of symbolic relations within personal life". Discussing the character of Sir Francis Haddock, he states that this ancestral figure resembles both Tintin and Haddock, "the foundling and the bastard", thus making the duo brothers as well as close friends. He adds that when Captain Haddock reenacts his ancestor's fight with Rackham, he adopts his "very soul, his mana, and is transformed in the process". Apostolidès also discusses Red Rackham, noting that the name "Red" conjures up "the forbidden colour of blood and wine" while "Rackham" combines raca ("false brother") (Note: False brother (faux frère) racaille in Aramaic) with the French word for scum (racaille), then highlighting a potential link between Rackham's name and that of Rascar Capac, an Incan mummy who appears in The Seven Crystal Balls. He further draws parallels between the model ships containing the secret parchments with the Arumbaya fetish containing a rare diamond which appears in The Broken Ear.

Literary critic Tom McCarthy highlighted the scene in which Tintin was imprisoned in the Marlinspike crypt, observing that it had parallels with Tintin's exploration of tombs and other secret chambers throughout the series. He identified the mystery left in Francis Haddock's parchments to be another appearance of Tintin's adventures being "framed by enigmas". To this he adds that in solving the enigma, Tintin shows that he is "the best reader" in the series, and it is this which establishes him as "the oeuvre's hero". McCarthy praised Hergé's Silk as one of the pivotal characters in the series who can "exude a presence far beyond that which we might expect from a novelist, let alone a cartoonist".

Pierre Fresnault-Deruelle discussed the scene in the story in which Tintin was imprisoned in the crypt of Marlinspike Hall. He stated that in this section "Hergé offers us an embedded story, a kind of interlude in which the artist, setting aside the use value of objects, takes the liberty of giving them mischievous powers, akin to a certain surrealism".

== Adaptations ==
In 1957, the animation company Belvision Studios produced Hergé's Adventures of Tintin, a series of daily five-minute colour adaptations based upon Hergé's original comics. The Secret of the Unicorn was the fourth to be adapted in the second animated series; it was directed by Ray Goossens and written by Greg, a well-known cartoonist who was to become editor-in-chief of Tintin magazine.

In 1991, a collaboration between the French studio Ellipse and the Canadian animation company Nelvana adapted 21 of the stories into a series of episodes. The Secret of the Unicorn was the ninth story of The Adventures of Tintin to be produced and was divided into two thirty-minute episodes. Directed by Stéphane Bernasconi, the series has been praised for being "generally faithful" to the original comics, to the extent that the animation was directly adopted from Hergé's original panels.

A 2011 motion capture feature film directed by Steven Spielberg and produced by Peter Jackson was released in most of the world October–November 2011, under the title The Adventures of Tintin: The Secret of the Unicorn, and in the US on 21 December, where it was simply titled The Adventures of Tintin. The film is partially based on The Secret of the Unicorn, combined with elements of Red Rackham's Treasure and The Crab with the Golden Claws. A video-game tie-in to the movie was released October 2011.
