= Ryan Jordan =

Ryan Jordan may refer to:

- Ryan Jordan, Wikipedia user involved in the Essjay controversy
- Ryan Jordan, vocalist for the American band Greenwheel
