= Unicorn (Tintin) =

Fictional ship in The Adventures of Tintin

The Unicorn
- The Unicorn, from The Secret of the Unicorn, set in 1676

Publication information
- First appearance: The Secret of the Unicorn (1943)

The Unicorn (French: La Licorne) is a fictional 17th-century French Navy warship featured in The Adventures of Tintin, a comic book series by Belgian cartoonist Hergé. It plays a leading role in both The Secret of the Unicorn (1943) and Red Rackham's Treasure (1944). The Unicorn also appears in the 2011 film adaptation The Adventures of Tintin: The Secret of the Unicorn.

In the Tintin series, the Unicorn attacked by pirates followed by a duel between its captain, Sir Francis Haddock (an ancestor of Captain Haddock) and the pirate Red Rackham. The Unicorn is scuttled and sinks, only to be discovered years later by Tintin and his friends in an attempt to locate Red Rackham's treasure.

== Creation ==
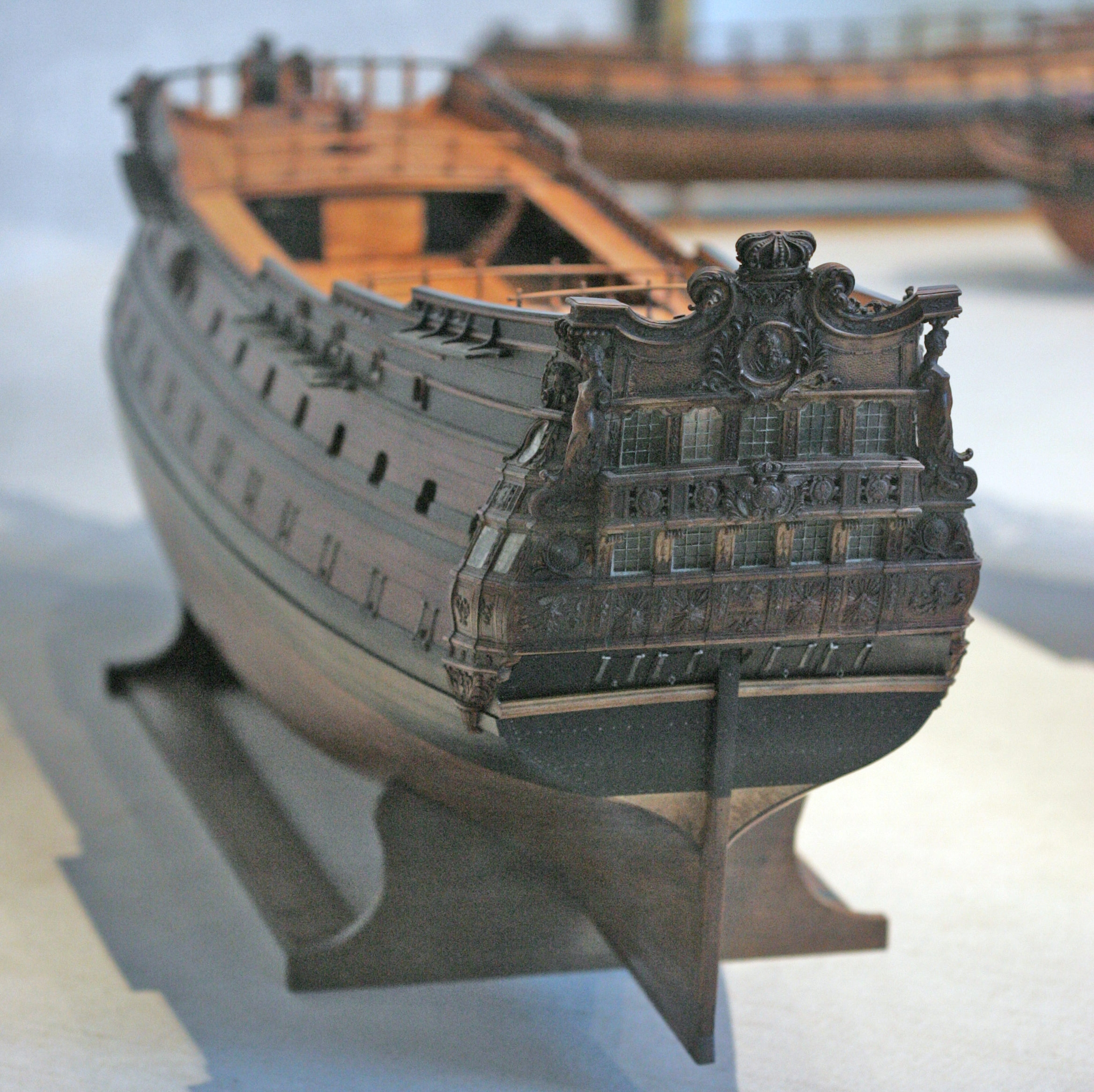
Model of Brillant, the ship of the line of Louis XIV's fleet that inspired Hergé to draw the Unicorn.

The Unicorn was inspired by the 64-gun Brillant, built in 1690 at Le Havre, France by the shipwright Salicon and then decorated by the designer Jean Bérain the Elder. In 1942, Hergé had decided that his latest Tintin adventure, The Secret of the Unicorn (1943), should depict images of his fictional Unicorn as detailed precision drawings. He used the services of his friend and local model ship maker Gérard Liger-Belair, son of a former naval officer and who owned a shop in Brussels that specialised in model ships, (Note: Hergé had enjoyed Scouting as a youth and knew Gérard Liger-Belair as secretary of the Federation of Catholic Scouts.) to find an appropriate historical vessel that he could customize to meet his historical needs. Liger-Belair's research produced three possibilities: A British frigate, a Dutch merchant ship and a French ship of the line. As Hergé preferred the ship of the line, Liger-Belair continued to research and discovered a historic document titled Architectura Navalis, which contained detailed drawings of French ships of the line. One in particular was from 1690, in the navy of Louis XIV of France, the 64-gun, Brillant. Liger-Belair soon completed a plan on a 1:100 scale followed by an extremely precise model. (Note: The plans for the ship, along with other information, was published in an article of the June 1989 issue of Amis de Hergé magazine.)

Hergé consulted the archives at the National Museum of Natural History and the then recently published L'Art et le Mer ("Art and the Sea") by Alexandre Berqueman. He also studied other vessels from the period, such as the Le Soleil Royal, La Couronne, La Royale and Le Reale de France to better understand 17th-century ship design. It was from the Le Reale de France that he gained a basis for his design of the Unicorn's jolly boat. He adopted the fictional ship's unicorn figurehead from a British frigate which had been built in 1745. When Liger-Belair's model was complete, Hergé realised it into the panels of his comics, regularly showing his renditions to Liger-Belair to ensure he was depicting the vessel with no technical errors. In its finished appearance in the book, the Unicorn is a ship of the third rank, a vessel with three-masts and 50 guns, more than 40 metres long and 11 metres wide.

After publication of The Secret of the Unicorn, Hergé's German publisher Carlsen Verlag gave him an antique model of a 17th-century Danish ship called the Enhjørningen (The Unicorn). Until that moment, Hergé had no idea that a ship with that name, complete with a unicorn figurehead, had ever actually existed.

== In The Adventures of Tintin ==
=== Fictional history ===
The Secret of the Unicorn is partially set in 1676. In the English translation, the Unicorn sails under the Union Jack during the reign of Charles II of England and is commanded by Sir Francis Haddock, an ancestor of Captain Haddock. In Hergé's original French version, however, la Licorne flies the French flag for the French Navy under King Louis XIV and is commanded by Chevalier François de Hadoque. No ship named the Unicorn was listed in the annals of the French Navy during the 17th century. However, from 1634 to 1688 the English Royal Navy had a ship of the line named HMS Unicorn which was, coincidentally, commanded by a Captain Haddock.

Red Rackham's Treasure (1944) tells of the adventure Tintin and his friends undertake to recover the lost treasure of the pirate Red Rackham, believed by Tintin to be aboard the shipwrecked Unicorn. Sir Francis had built three models of the Unicorn and had hidden a treasure map inside each one. The adventure, told across both books, leads Tintin to the Unicorn and to the lost treasure.

A 2011 feature film adaptation of both Tintin books retells the story of the Unicorn. The Adventures of Tintin: The Secret of the Unicorn directed by Steven Spielberg and produced by Peter Jackson was released in October–December 2011.

=== Plot role ===
While sailing in the West Indies in 1676, the Unicorn, commanded by Sir Francis Haddock, is seized and captured by a group of pirates led by Red Rackham. The pirates hoist a red pennant—no life would be spared. During the battle, Sir Francis is hit and loses consciousness. Later, the members of the Unicorn crew still alive are killed or thrown overboard. Sir Francis regains consciousness, finding himself tied to the mainmast. The pirate ship is damaged and sinking, so Red Rackham moves his treasure on board the Unicorn. The ship then sails to an uninhabited island. When anchored near the shore of the island, Sir Francis manages to free himself and goes below deck to the Unicorn's gunpowder stores. Whilst there, he encounters Rackham for the final time, killing him in a sword fight. Before escaping in the ship's jolly boat, he is able to set fire to the gunpowder by means of a slow-burning fuse, causing the Unicorn (with Rackham's drunken crew and presumably Red Rackham's treasure still aboard) to explode and sink.

In the present day, Tintin, his dog Snowy, and his friends Captain Haddock and Professor Calculus follow coordinates that Sir Francis had left his three sons in a strange riddle hidden in three model ships of the Unicorn. Reaching the coordinates, they discover the island and, upon diving, they find the wreck of the Unicorn. Although they recover various artefacts from it, they do not find the treasure. Back in Belgium, Tintin realises that Sir Francis' message referred, not to the location of the Unicorn, but to a globe mounted on a statue in Sir Francis' former country home. Understanding now that Francis would never have left the treasure but would have taken it with him to his home, Tintin locates the coordinates to the treasure on the globe, presses a secret button he finds there, and discovers Red Rackham's treasure hidden inside.

== See also ==
- List of boats in The Adventures of Tintin
