= French ship Brillant (1690) =

Ship of the line of the French Navy

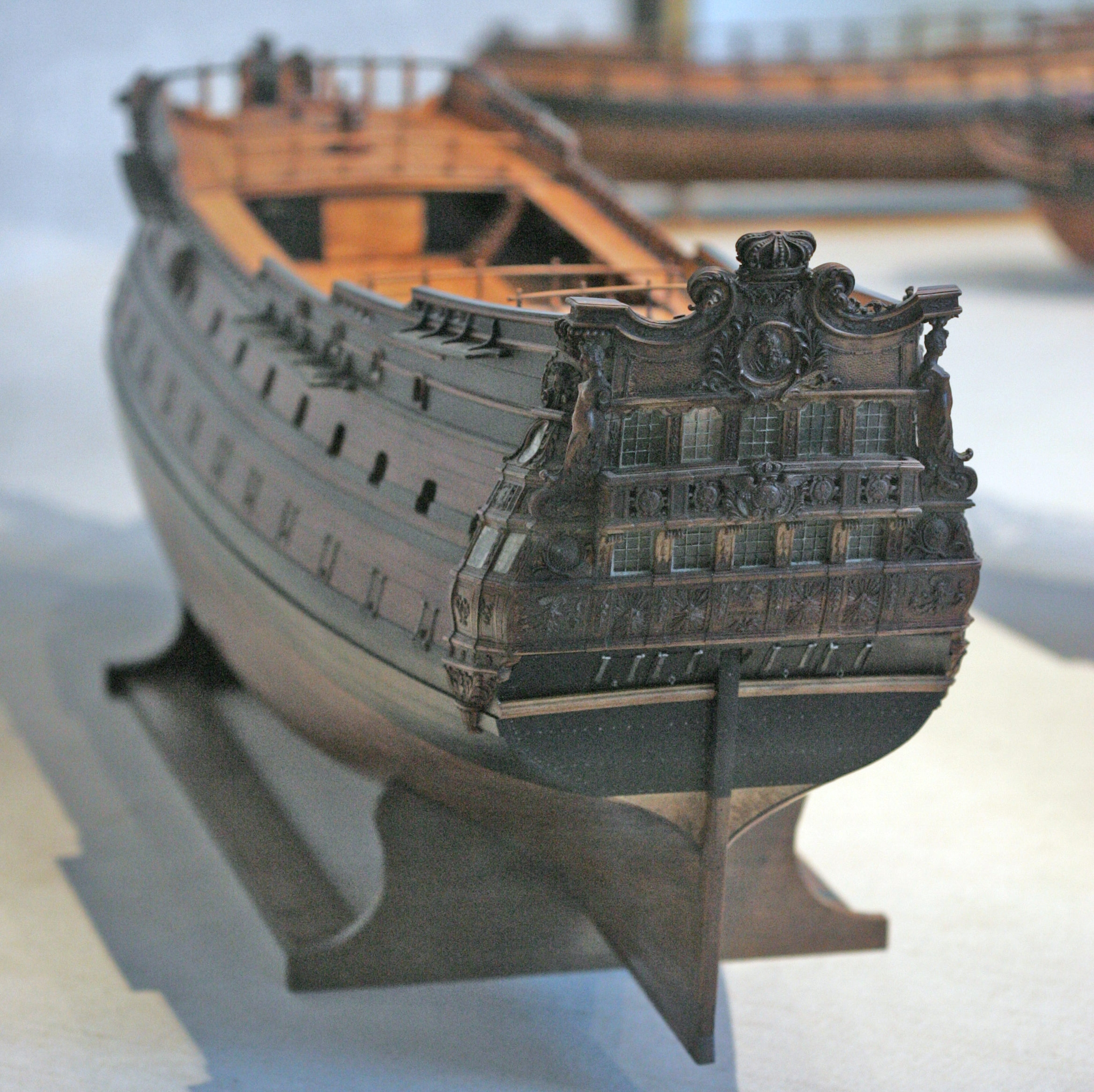
A model of Brillant

Brillant was a 64-gun ship of the line of the French Navy. She was first classified as a Second-rank ship, and later reclassified as a Third-rank. She was built between 1689 and 1690 at Le Havre, under supervision by engineer Étienne Salicon. She served until 1719, and took part in the Nine Years' War (1688–1697) and the War of Spanish Succession (1702–1714).

== Career ==
=== Nine Years' War ===
Brillant entered service one year into the war with England and Holland, and started taking part in operations under Captain de Beaujeu. She was part of the squadron under Tourville that departed Brest on 23 June 1690, leading to the Battle of Beachy Head on 10 July. Brillant held the 29th position in the French line of battle.

In 1692, De Combes took command of Brillant and she took part in Tourville's operation to cover an invasion of England from 12 May. On 29 May, she took part in the Battle of Barfleur, 14th in the French line of battle. In the night following of the battle, she managed to escape, and thus avoid the Battle of La Hougue. In 1693, she took part in the Battle of Lagos, off Portugal.

=== War of Spanish Succession (1702–1714) ===
Alternative reports say Rochefort and with Brest between 1702 and 1705.

In August 1705, she was attached to an 11-ship squadron under Iberville, for an expedition against New England, New York and Newfoundland. The force left in two separate divisions that were to join up in the Caribbean. Brillant, under François-Joseph, comte de Choiseul-Beaupré, was part of the first division, under comte de Chavagnac, with five ships and one frigate, bound for Martinique The armament of Brillant was improved to 64 guns (twenty-six 24-pounder long guns, twenty-six 12-pounders, and twelve 6-pounders).

In February 1706, Choiseul attacked Saint Kitts, without waiting to join with Chavagnac. He managed to raid and loot the island, but not to destroy its forts. He then returned to Martinique, where he found Iberville, who had arrived on 7 March with the second division, which comprised four ships-of the-line and one frigate. Iberville decided to mount an attack against Nevis. Brillant took position in front of one of the forts and bombarded it as a diversion, while Iberville conducted a nighttime landing on the rear of the British defences, defeating them on 4 April. Iberville's intentions were to attack Virginia next, but his death at Havana on 9 July 1706 ended the campaign.

Brillant returned to France with the rest of the squadron. In 1707, she was reclassified as a Third rate (vaisseau troisième de rang) and refitted. She returned to service in 1708, in the midst of a financial crisis that made it difficult to maintain the fleet. Duguay-Trouin's brother, visiting Brest in 1707, remarked that only four ships were seaworthy. Brillant was among them, but stayed in port.

==== Raid on Rio de Janeiro (1711) ====
In 1711, Brillant was reactivated for a raid on Rio de Janeiro, under Duguay-Trouin, with seven ships of the line, six frigates, a bombship and three transports. She was under Chevalier de Goyon-Beaufort. She had two extra 6-pounders and 522 men.

The squadron departed in early June, slipped past British cruisers, and arrived at Rio on 12 September. The French attacked immediately, with Brillant second in the line of battle. On 13 September, Goyon-Beaufort was put in charge of the landing at Goat Island. Along with Mars, she bombarded and destroyed the main fort of the city. Duguay-Trouin then gave Goyon-Beaufort command of one of the landing parties.

After the Battle of Rio de Janeiro ended in Portuguese surrender and payment of a tribute, Brillant returned to France during November. She avoided the storm on 19 January 1712 that sank two of the ships of the squadron (Magnanime and Fidèle), along with their loot, off the Azores.

With the return of peace, Brillant was put in the ordinary. In 1717, she was due for a refit in Brest. She was struck in 1719.

== Legacy ==
Brillant was the inspiration for Hergé's Unicorn (French: Licorne) in the albums The Secret of the Unicorn and Red Rackham's Treasure, a ship of the French navy captained by an ancestor of Captain Haddock.

A model of Brillant is on display at the Musée national de la Marine, in Paris. It was made around 1836 by modelist Jean-Baptiste Tanneron, based on documents contemporary with the ship. The model is at the 1/40th scale, making it 48 cm high, 35 cm wide and 140 cm long. It is unrigged and without artillery, most of the effort having been devoted to the sculptures that reproduce Jean Bérain's drawings. The poop deck bears the motto Honneur et Patrie, which has been part of the motto of the French Navy since the 19th century, but is anachronistic for the Louis XIV era, where sailors would simply shout out Vive le Roi ("Long live the King"). The model was put on display for the temporary exhibit Tintin, Haddock et les bateaux in 1999.

== Notes and references ==
=== Bibliography ===
==== Recent works ====
- Vergé-Franceschi, Michel (2002). Dictionnaire d'Histoire maritime. Bouquins (in French). éditions Robert Laffont. p. 1508. ISBN 2-221-08751-8.
- Boulaire, Alain (2011). La Marine française: De la Royale de Richelieu aux missions d'aujourd'hui (in French). Quimper: éditions Palantines. p. 383. ISBN 978-2-35678-056-0.
- Monaque, Rémi (2016). Une histoire de la marine de guerre française (in French). Paris: éditions Perrin. p. 526. ISBN 978-2-262-03715-4.
- Jean Meyer et Martine Acerra, Histoire de la marine française : des origines à nos jours, Rennes, Ouest-France, 1994, 427 p. [détail de l'édition] (ISBN 2-7373-1129-2, notice BnF no FRBNF35734655)
- Martine Acerra et André Zysberg, L'essor des marines de guerre européennes : vers 1680-1790, Paris, SEDES, coll. « Regards sur l'histoire » (no 119), 1997, 298 p. [détail de l'édition] (ISBN 2-7181-9515-0, notice BnF no FRBNF36697883)
- Villiers, Patrick; Duteil, Jean-Pierre; Muchembled, Robert (1997). L'Europe, la mer et les colonies: XVIIe-XVIIIe siècle. Carré histoire (in French). Paris: Hachette supérieur. p. 255. ISBN 2-01-145196-5.
- Villiers, Patrick (2015). La France sur mer: De Louis XIII à Napoléon Ier. Pluriel (in French). Paris: Fayard. p. 286. ISBN 978-2-8185-0437-6.
- John A. Lynn (2014). Les Guerres de Louis XIV. Tempus. éditions Perrin. p. 561. ISBN 978-2-262-04755-9.
- Bély, Lucien (2015). Dictionnaire Louis XIV. Bouquins (in French). éditions Robert Laffont. p. 1405. ISBN 978-2-221-12482-6.
- Siméon, Nicolas (2007). Louis XIV et la mer (in French). Paris: Édition Conti. p. 121. ISBN 978-2-286-03157-2.
- Chaline, Olivier (2016). La mer et la France: Quand les Bourbons voulaient dominer les océans. Au fil de l'histoire (in French). Paris: Flammarion. p. 560. ISBN 978-2-0813-3327-7.
- Roche, Jean-Michel (2005). Dictionnaire des bâtiments de la flotte de guerre française de Colbert à nos jours (PDF) (in French). éditions LTP. p. 530.
- Demerliac, Alain (1992). La Marine de Louis XIV: nomenclature des vaisseaux du Roi-soleil de 1661 à 1715. Nice: Omega. p. 292. ISBN 2-906381-15-2..
- Horeau, Yves; Godin, Philippe; Chemin, Jean-Claude; Piquemal, Jean (1999). Tintin, Haddock et les Bateaux (in French). Bruxelles: éditions Moulinsart. p. 58. ISBN 2-930284-19-6.

==== Older works ====
- Le Moyne d'Iberville, Pierre (May 1706). "Relation de Monsieur d'Iberville, depuis son départ de la Martinique, jusqu'à la prise et capitulation de l'île de Niéves, appartenante aux Anglois". Mercure Galant (in French). Paris: 282–319.
- Duguay-Trouin, René (1723). Relation de l'expédition de Rio-Janeiro, par une escadre de vaisseaux du Roy que commandoit Mr. Du Guay-Troüin, en 1712 (in French). Paris: Pierre Cot. p. 83.
- Duguay-Trouin, René (1820). Mémoires de Duguay-Trouin: 1689-1715 (in-4) (in French). Paris: Foucault.
- Pâris, Edmond (1886). Collection de plans ou Dessins de navires et de bateaux anciens et modernes, existants ou disparus : avec les éléments numériques nécessaires à leur construction (in French). Paris: Gauthier-Villars. p. 128.
- Troude, Onésime (1867–1868). Batailles navales de la France (in French). Paris: Challamel aîné. p. 453.
- La Roncière, Charles (1932). Histoire de la Marine française: Le crépuscule du Grand règne, l'apogée de la Guerre de Course (in French). Paris: Plon. p. 674.

=== External links ===
- French ship of the line Le Brillant (1690), article du site anglophone Three Decks - Warships in the Age of Sail
- Vaisseaux de ligne français de 1682 à 1780, liste tenue par Ronald Deschênes sur le site agh.
- Le Brillant, sur le site du Musée national de la Marine, Paris.
- Tableau de la flotte française en 1691, en 1696, en 1702, en 1704, en 1706, en 1707, en 1708, en 1709, en 1712, en 1716, en 1717 et en 1719, sur netmarine.net, d'après Jean-Michel Roche, Dictionnaire des bâtiments de la flotte de guerre française de Colbert à nos jours, t. 1, de 1671 à 1870.
