= Red Rackham's Treasure =

Tintin album by Belgian cartoonist Hergé

Red Rackham's Treasure (Le Trésor de Rackham le Rouge)
- Cover of the English edition
- Date: 1944
- Series: The Adventures of Tintin
- Publisher: Casterman

Creative team
- Creator: Hergé

Original publication
- Published in: Le Soir
- Date of publication: 19 February 1943 – 23 September 1943
- Language: French

Translation
- Publisher: Methuen
- Date: 1959
- Translator: Leslie Lonsdale-Cooper; Michael Turner

Chronology
- Preceded by: The Secret of the Unicorn (1943)
- Followed by: The Seven Crystal Balls (1948)

Red Rackham's Treasure (French: Le Trésor de Rackham le Rouge) is the twelfth volume of The Adventures of Tintin, the comics series by Belgian cartoonist Hergé. The story was serialised daily in Le Soir, Belgium's leading francophone newspaper, from February to September 1943 amidst the German occupation of Belgium during World War II. Completing an arc that begun in The Secret of the Unicorn, the story tells of young reporter Tintin and his friend Captain Haddock as they launch an expedition to the Caribbean to locate the treasure of the pirate Red Rackham.

Red Rackham's Treasure was a commercial success and was published in book form by Casterman the year following its conclusion. Hergé continued The Adventures of Tintin with The Seven Crystal Balls, while the series itself became a defining part of the Franco-Belgian comics tradition. Red Rackham's Treasure has been cited as one of the most important installments in the series for marking the first appearance of eccentric scientist Cuthbert Calculus, who subsequently became a core character. The story was adapted for the 1957 Belvision animated series Hergé's Adventures of Tintin, the 1991 Ellipse/Nelvana animated series The Adventures of Tintin, the 1992-3 BBC Radio 5 dramatisation of the Adventures, the feature film The Adventures of Tintin (2011) directed by Steven Spielberg, and the film's tie-in video game.

== Synopsis ==
The synopsis continues a plot begun in The Secret of the Unicorn.

Tintin and his friend Captain Haddock plan an expedition to the West Indies aboard a fishing trawler, the Sirius, to search for the treasure of the pirate Red Rackham. Having previously read three parchments authored by Haddock's ancestor, Sir Francis Haddock, the duo had discovered the coordinates to what they believe is the treasure aboard the sunken 17th century vessel, the Unicorn, near an unknown island. An eccentric, hard-of-hearing inventor named Professor Cuthbert Calculus offers to aid them with the use of his shark-shaped one-man submarine, but they decline his assistance. Setting sail, they are joined by the police detectives Thomson and Thompson and soon discover that Calculus has stowed away on board, bringing his submarine with him.

When they reach the coordinates shown on the parchments, there is no island in sight. Frustrated, Haddock ponders turning back, but Tintin soon realizes the problem: If Sir Francis had used a French chart instead of an English chart to calculate the position, the coordinates would have been measured on the Paris Meridian rather than the Greenwich Meridian. As they have been using the Greenwich Meridian, they realise that they are too far west.

After traveling to the correct position, they discover an uncharted island, which is located about 230 km (140 mi) north of Punta Cana (Dominican Republic) and 286 km (178 mi) East-South-East of Cockburn Town (location of 20°37'42.0"N 70°52'15.0"W, adjusted by 2° 20' 14.02500" E for the Paris Meridian). There, they find a statue of Sir Francis Haddock and other evidence, including parrots who still use Haddock insults handed down from Sir Francis. Tintin deduces that Francis Haddock had taken refuge on the island and that the wreck of the Unicorn must be nearby. They locate the wreck using Calculus' submarine and recover various artefacts from it, but do not find the treasure. Among the artefacts is a strongbox containing old documents revealing that Sir Francis Haddock had been the owner of the country estate Marlinspike Hall.

Back in Belgium, Calculus purchases the Hall, using funds from the sale of his submarine design, and gives it to Haddock. Tintin and Haddock search the house's cellars, where Tintin spots a statue of Saint John the Evangelist holding a cross with a globe and eagle at its feet. Tintin suddenly remembers that Francis Haddock's original three parchments said, "For 'tis from the light that light will dawn, and then shines forth the Eagle's cross" and realises that this message referred, not to the location of the Unicorn, but to Saint John "the eagle": his traditional symbol. Tintin locates the island on the globe, presses a secret button which he finds there, and discovers Red Rackham's treasure hidden inside. Sometime later, Haddock hosts an exhibition of the treasure and several Unicorn artefacts in Marlinspike Hall.

== History ==
=== Background ===
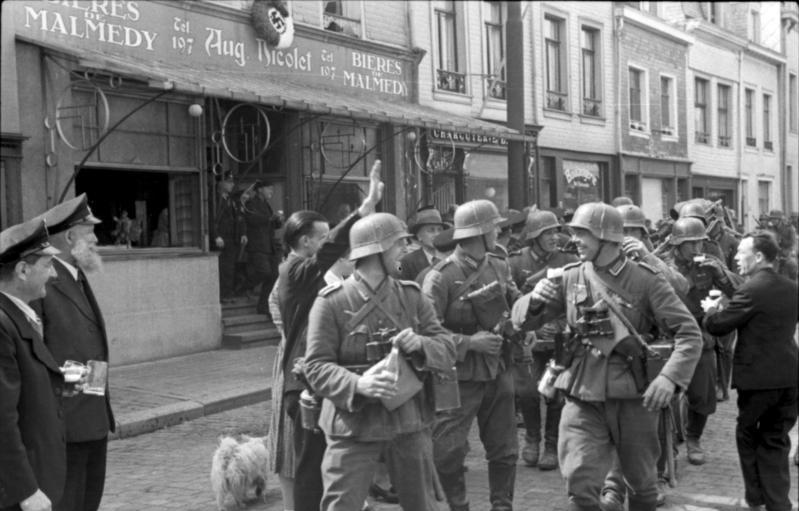
Nazi German soldiers in eastern Belgium in 1940. Red Rackham's Treasure and The Secret of the Unicorn were both written while Belgium was under German occupation.

Red Rackham's Treasure was serialized amidst the German occupation of Belgium during World War II. Hergé had accepted a position working for Le Soir, Belgium's largest Francophone daily newspaper. Confiscated from its original owners, Le Soir was permitted by the German authorities to reopen under the directorship of Belgian editor Raymond de Becker, although it remained firmly under Nazi control, supporting the German war effort and espousing anti-Semitism. After joining Le Soir on 15 October 1940, Hergé became editor of its new children's supplement, Le Soir Jeunesse, with the help of an old friend, Paul Jamin, and the cartoonist Jacques Van Melkebeke, before paper shortages forced The Adventures of Tintin to be serialised daily in the main pages of Le Soir. Some Belgians were upset that Hergé was willing to work for a newspaper controlled by the occupying Nazi administration, although he was heavily enticed by the size of Le Soir's readership, which numbered some 600,000. Faced with the reality of Nazi oversight, Hergé abandoned the overt political themes that had pervaded much of his earlier work, instead adopting a policy of neutrality. Entertainment producer and author Harry Thompson observed that, without the need to satirise political types, "Hergé was now concentrating more on plot and on developing a new style of character comedy. The public reacted positively".

Red Rackham's Treasure was the second half of a two-part story arc which had begun with the previous adventure, The Secret of the Unicorn. This arc was the first that Hergé had produced since Cigars of the Pharaoh and The Blue Lotus (1934–36). However, as Tintin expert Michael Farr related, whereas Cigars of the Pharaoh and The Blue Lotus had been largely "self-sufficient and self-contained", the connection between The Secret of the Unicorn and Red Rackham's Treasure is far closer.

=== Influences ===
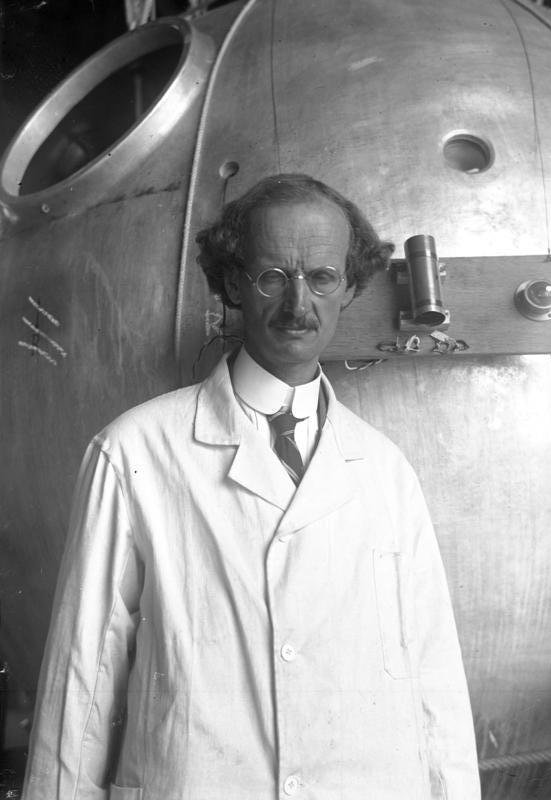
Calculus was visually based upon the scientist Auguste Piccard.

Red Rackham's Treasure introduced Professor Cuthbert Calculus to The Adventures of Tintin, who became a recurring character. Hergé had made use of various eccentric professors in earlier volumes of the series, such as Sophocles Sarcophagus in Cigars of the Pharaoh, Hector Alembick in King Ottokar's Sceptre, and Decimus Phostle in The Shooting Star, all of whom prefigure the arrival of Calculus. The character's deafness had been inspired by a colleague whom Hergé had worked with years earlier at Le Vingtième Siècle. Visually, Calculus was based on a real scientist, the Swiss inventor Auguste Piccard, who had been the first man to explore the stratosphere in a hot air balloon in 1931. Hergé had observed Piccard walking about Brussels on a number of occasions, however the character of Calculus would be notably much shorter than Piccard. Hergé named this character Tryphon Tournesol; while at one level the surname meant "sunflower", the expression "papier tournesol" refers to litmus paper, used to measure pH levels or acidity, and the forename was adopted from a carpenter named Tryphon Beckaert whom Hergé had encountered in Boitsfort. Tryphon Tournesol was later renamed Cuthbert Calculus in the English translation and Balduin Bienlein (the surname meaning "Little Bee") for the German translation.

Calculus' shark-shaped submarine was visually based on a real American submarine; Hergé had seen a picture of this in a German newspaper. The diving suit worn in the story was also based on clippings that Hergé had accumulated. Similarly, the dockside bar depicted by the cartoonist was based on an illustration that he had collected. The shop where Haddock and Tintin buy the diving equipment, including the suit, was inspired from a picture of a bar which was featured in the German magazine, Berliner Illustrirte Zeitung. The tribal effigy found on a Caribbean island by Sir Francis Haddock was based on a Bamileke tribal statue from Cameroon that Hergé saw in a museum. The Sirius, which had appeared before in The Shooting Star, was named after the SS Sirius, the first ship to cross the Atlantic Ocean solely under steam power, but was visually based upon the design of a trawler, the John-O.88. Hergé had sketched this ship in Ostend docks before obtaining both detailed plans of the trawler from the builders, Jos Boel & Son, and a small-scale model of it from a collector. The undersea wreck of the Unicorn was loosely inspired by images of the wreck of a 17th-century Swedish vessel, the Vasa, which Hergé had collected. The instance in the story in which a shark swallows a large box (that the characters hope contains the treasure) is based on a real account of a shark that swallowed a camera from the American underwater photographer Otis Barton, which Hergé had encountered in a French illustrated magazine.

The brief appearance of Dr. Daumière, who warns Haddock to cease drinking alcohol, was an allusion to Hergé's own physician, Dr. Daumerie. (Note: In the English translation, Dr Daumière becomes Doctor A. Leech.) Hergé made a comical reference to the French comedian Sacha Guitry in the story by advertising a play by Guitry titled Me in which Guitry himself plays every role. (Note: Haddock walks into a post on which is a poster for this play, on page 2.)

=== Publication ===
Hergé deemed this frame from the story to be one of his two favourites from the entire Adventures of Tintin.

Le Trésor De Rackham Le Rouge began serialisation as a daily strip in Le Soir from 19 February 1943. The title of the new adventure had been announced in an advertisement in the newspaper two days previously. In Belgium, it was then published in a 62-page book format by Editions Casterman in 1944. Red Rackham's Treasure contained one of Hergé's two favourite illustrations from The Adventures of Tintin. It combines three actions encapsulating a sequence of events into one drawing: Haddock striding up the beach in the foreground, Tintin, Thomson and Thompson bringing the rowboat ashore in the midground, and the Sirius weighing anchor in the background. (Note: The illustration is in the upper left frame on page 25.)

Rather than immediately embark on the creation of a new Tintin adventure, Hergé agreed to a proposal that Le Soir's crime writer, Paul Kinnet, would author a detective story featuring Thomson and Thompson. The story was titled Dupont et Dupond, détectives (Thomson and Thompson, Detectives), and was illustrated by Hergé.

The Secret of the Unicorn and Red Rackham's Treasure were the first two Adventures of Tintin to be published in standalone English-language translations for the British market, as King Ottokar's Sceptre had previously been serialised in Eagle in 1951. Published by Casterman in 1952, these two editions sold poorly and have since become rare collector's items. They would be republished for the British market seven years later, this time by Methuen with translations provided by Michael Turner and Leslie Lonsdale-Cooper. Farr reported that Red Rackham's Treasure is the best-selling story in The Adventures of Tintin, while Harry Thompson referred to The Secret of the Unicorn-Red Rackham's Treasure arc as "the most successful of all Tintin's adventures".

== Critical analysis ==
Harry Thompson stated that the Secrets of the Unicorn-Red Rackham's Treasure arc marked the beginning of the third and central stage of "Tintin's career". He furthermore stated that in these two stories, Tintin has been converted from a reporter into an explorer to cope with the new political climate. He stated that in this story, Hergé "abandons the complex plotting of The Secret of the Unicorn in favour of an episodic style of adventure not seen since the early books". Thompson further draws attention to the arrival of Calculus in the story, describing him as the "third and final member" of Tintin's "family". Thompson was critical of the use of colour in the story, stating that much of it looks better in black-and-white, as it was originally printed in Le Soir.

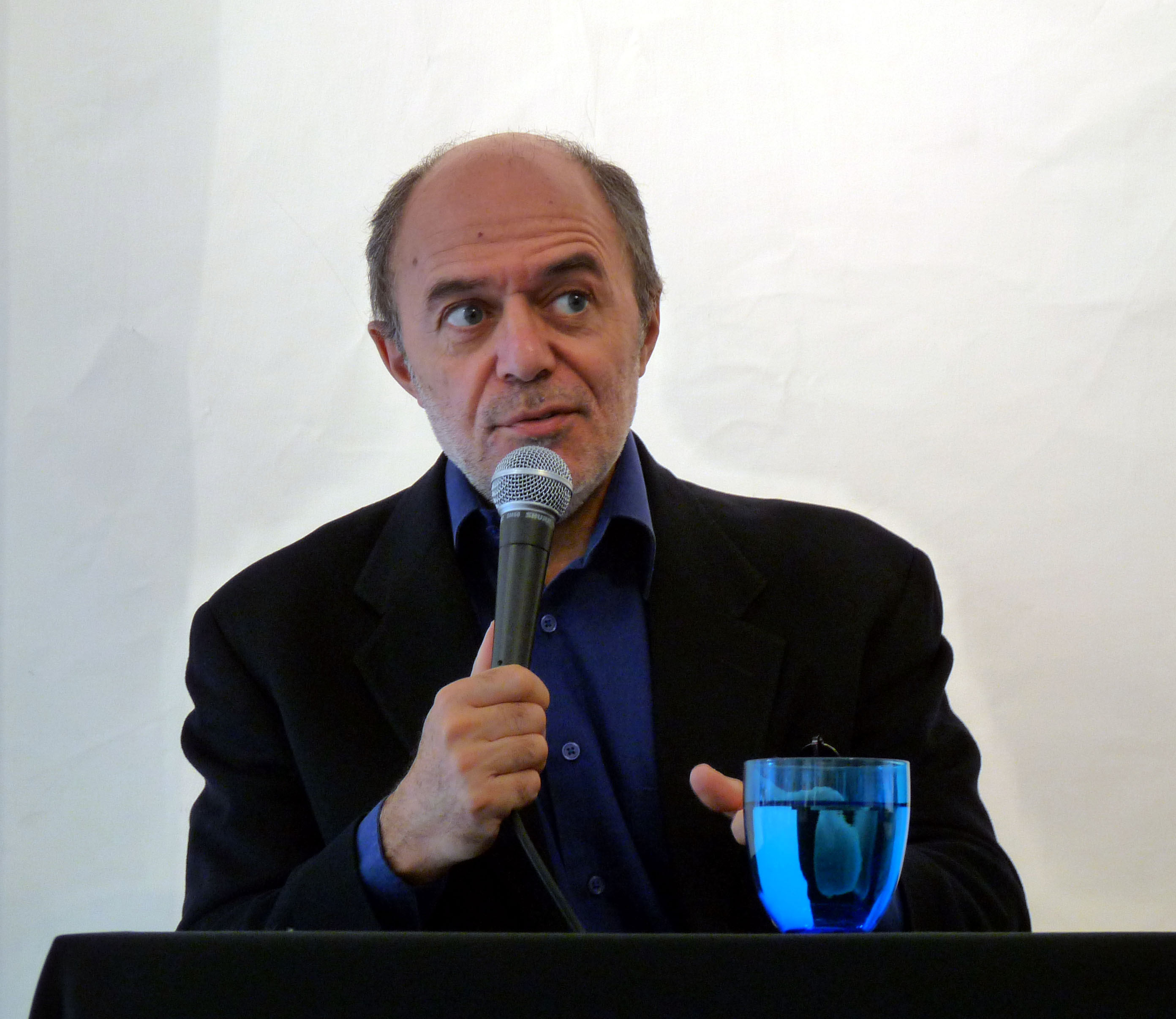
Hergé biographer Pierre Assouline believes Red Rackham's Treasure "reveal[s] Hergé at a new level in his art".

Hergé biographer Benoît Peeters observed that both The Secret of the Unicorn and Red Rackham's Treasure "hold a crucial position" in The Adventures of Tintin as it establishes the "Tintin universe" with its core set of characters. He felt that while religious elements had been present in previous stories, they were even stronger in The Secret of the Unicorn and its sequel, something which he attributed to Van Melkebeke's influence. Peeters believed that Red Rackham's Treasure was "an unforgettable book" because it is the volume in which the "family"—meaning Tintin, Snowy, Haddock, and Calculus—all come together. Fellow biographer Pierre Assouline echoed this idea, noting that Hergé had "settled" the three characters in their new home. Focusing on the character of Calculus, he noted that the idea of the eccentric professor was "so universal that it would be inaccurate to point to any one source", suggesting possible influences from Charlie Chaplin and Hergé's own father. For Assouline, the professor embodies "the gentle madness and subtle humour in comic strips". He added that both Red Rackham's Treasure and its predecessor "reveal Hergé at a new level in his art", and suggested that the reason for their popularity lay in the fact that they were "the visual continuation of a literary universe that stretches from Jules Verne to Pierre Benoit".

Jean-Marc Lofficier and Randy Lofficier opined that The Secret of the Unicorn-Red Rackham's Treasure arc represents "a turning point" for the series as it shifts the reader's attention from Tintin to Haddock, who has become "by far, the most interesting character". They claim that the introduction of Calculus "completes the indispensable triangle that imbues Tintin with its mythic quality". Asserting that here, Hergé's "art has reached a degree of near-perfection", they awarded it five stars out of five. Michael Farr said that the scene introducing Calculus was "a comic tour de force" marking the start of the "rich vein of humour" that the character brought to the series. Noting that unlike The Shooting Star, this two-book story arc contains "scarcely an allusion to occupation and war", he praised the arc's narrative as "perfectly paced, without that feeling of haste" present in some of Hergé's earlier work.

In his psychoanalytical study of the Adventures of Tintin, the academic Jean-Marie Apostolidès characterised the Secret of the Unicorn-Red Rackham's Treasure arc as being about the characters going on a "treasure hunt that turns out to be at the same time a search for their roots". He stated that the arc revolves around Haddock's ancestry, and in doing so "deals with the meanings of symbolic relations within personal life". He compared Sir Francis Haddock to Robinson Crusoe and noted how the Caribbean natives deified Sir Francis Haddock by erecting a statue of him in the same manner that the Congolese deify Tintin at the end of Tintin in the Congo. Highlighting that Calculus is one of many eccentric scientists to appear in the series, Apostolidès nonetheless emphasises the uniqueness of Calculus, by noting that the character approaches Tintin, rather than Tintin approaching him, as the young reporter had done with previous scientists. Commenting on the introduction of Calculus' shark submarine, Apostolidès states that it "allows them to cross a boundary previously restricting human beings and to penetrate into another universe, the one beneath the seas that holds secrets hitherto unknown". Ultimately, he believes that by the end of the story, "the family structure is in place", with Calculus representing a father figure with financial control, and Haddock and Tintin, who have become brothers through their joint adventure, adding that with the aid of Francis Haddock, "the ancestor", they are given a home at Marlinspike Hall.

Literary critic Tom McCarthy highlighted what he perceived as scenes in Red Rackham's Treasure which reflected common themes in The Adventures of Tintin. He pointed out that in being a stowaway aboard the ship, Calculus was one of many stowaways in the series, and that the treasure represented the theme of jewels and precious stones which also cropped up in The Broken Ear, Tintin in the Congo, and The Castafiore Emerald. He noted Tintin's misreading of the parchments and stated this was one of a number of calculation mistakes that the character makes in the series. He suggested that a scene in which the shark submarine pushes between Haddock's buttocks was a form of sexual innuendo referencing anal sex, highlighting similar innuendo in The Broken Ear and The Crab with the Golden Claws.

== Adaptations ==
In 1957, the animation company Belvision Studios produced Hergé's Adventures of Tintin, a series of daily five-minute colour adaptations based upon Hergé's original comics. Red Rackham's Treasure was the fifth story to be adapted in the second series (and the eighth to be adapted overall), being directed by Ray Goossens and written by the cartoonist Greg. In later years, Greg would become editor-in-chief of Tintin magazine.

In 1991, a collaboration between the French studio Ellipse and the Canadian animation company Nelvana adapted 21 of the stories into a series of episodes, each 42 minutes long. Red Rackham's Treasure was the tenth episode of The Adventures of Tintin to be produced, although it ran half as long as most of the others. Directed by Stéphane Bernasconi, the series has been praised for being "generally faithful", with compositions having been actually directly taken from the panels in the original comic book.

A 2011 motion capture feature film directed by Steven Spielberg and produced by Peter Jackson was released in most of the world October–November 2011, under the title The Adventures of Tintin: The Secret of the Unicorn, and in the US on 21 December, where it was simply titled The Adventures of Tintin. The film is partially based on Red Rackham's Treasure, combined with elements of The Secret of the Unicorn and The Crab with the Golden Claws. A video-game tie-in to the movie was released October 2011.
