= La Révolution Wikipédia =

Multi-authored study of Wikipedia

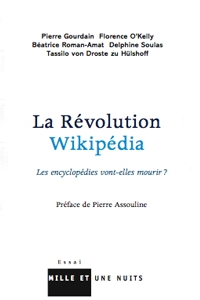
- Authors: Pierre Gourdain, Florence O'Kelly, Béatrice Roman-Amat, Delphine Soulas, Tassilo von Droste zu Hülshoff
- Original title: La Révolution Wikipédia
- Language: French
- Subject: French Wikipedia
- Publisher: Éditions Mille et Une Nuits
- Publication date: 2007
- Publication place: France
- Pages: 144
- ISBN: 978-2-7555-0051-6

La Révolution Wikipédia (English: The Wikipedia Revolution), published in France in 2007, is a multi-authored study of Wikipedia focusing on the online encyclopedia's reliability and its likely influence on printed reference books. Special attention is given to the French Wikipedia. The preface is contributed by Pierre Assouline, known as a critic of Wikipedia.

La Révolution Wikipédia began as a team project by five postgraduate journalism students under Pierre Assouline's supervision at the Institut d'Études Politiques de Paris. The authors, who get equal credit on the title page, are Pierre Gourdain, Florence O'Kelly, Béatrice Roman-Amat, Delphine Soulas and Tassilo von Droste zu Hülshoff. The main text explores Wikipedia in a balanced way, with a detailed analysis of the comparison of Wikipedia and the Encyclopædia Britannica published by Nature in December 2005: this comparison relates to a main theme of the book, as signalled by its subtitle Les encyclopédies vont-elles mourir? ("Are encyclopedias about to die?"). It includes interviews on this issue with editors of French encyclopedias and dictionaries.

La Révolution Wikipédia studies the internal structures of Wikipedia and reports on the motivations of some active French Wikipedians, with an interview of Esprit Fugace. A review on Internet & Opinion (s) noted an apparent negative emphasis in this section and points out that Wikipedia has correction mechanisms, using the Essjay case (already discussed in the book) as an example: "So Essjay is banned and has had to close his Wikipedia page. Who says that anarchy reigns unchallenged on the Web?"

There is an unresolved conflict between the sceptical but neutral approach of the main authors and the fiercely anti-Wikipedia stance of Pierre Assouline, whose long preface is headed Et ça passe pour une source ... ("And people call it a source!") With the exception of the relatively suspicious approach of the Bulletin des bibliothèques de France (the house journal of French librarians), media reviews of La Révolution Wikipédia were in general more favourable to Wikipedia than the book itself is. "Wikipedia is disturbing," said Shvoong, "it's becoming livelier and more visible every day ... and it's overturning the traditional order by allowing users to share in the project."

One feature of the research that went into La Révolution Wikipédia was the insertion of several deliberate errors into the French Wikipedia, with the aim of observing how long it would take for them to be corrected. According to Assouline, his instructions to the students had been for "a group study, lasting several months. Take [Wikipedia] apart and see how it works." This experiment was reported in the French daily newspaper Libération when the original student project was submitted. Information about edits that Wikipedians regarded as vandalism led to investigation by French Wikipedia administrators and to the blocking of the IP address from which they were made. The address was that of the Institut d'Études Politiques network; in response to the blocking, Agnès Chauveau, director of the Institute's School of Journalism, claimed that its students "did not sabotage the encyclopedia" and that the Institute was being "punished".

== Publication details ==
- Pierre Gourdain, Florence O'Kelly, Béatrice Roman-Amat, Delphine Soulas, Tassilo von Droste zu Hülshoff, La Révolution Wikipédia. Preface by Pierre Assouline. Paris: Éditions Mille et Une Nuits, 2007. ISBN 978-2-7555-0051-6

== See also ==
- Bibliography of Wikipedia
