= Pierre Assouline =

French writer and journalist (born 1953)

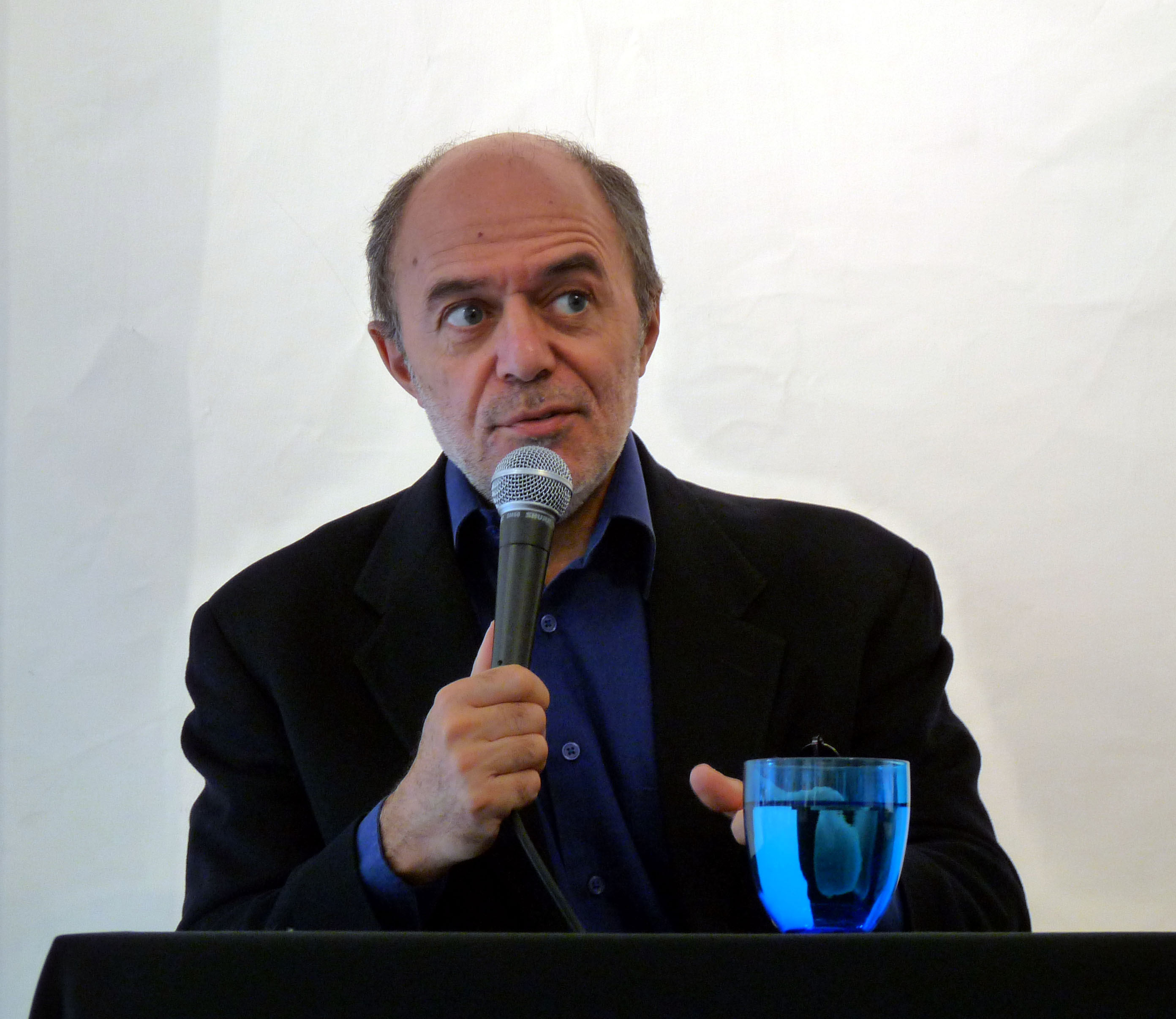
- Assouline in Strasbourg, April 2009
- Born: 17 April 1953 (age 73); Casablanca, Morocco
- Occupations: Novelist; essayist; biographer
- Writing career
- Notable works: Biography of Hergé, Biography of Daniel-Henry Kahnweiler, Lutetia
- Notable awards: Le Prix Maison de la Presse (2005), Le Prix de la langue française (2007), Le prix Méditerranée (2011), Le prix littéraire Prince-Pierre-de-Monaco (2011)
- Website: passouline.blog.lemonde.fr

Pierre Assouline (born 17 April 1953) is a French writer and journalist. He was born in Casablanca, Morocco to a Jewish family. He has published several novels and biographies, and also contributes articles for the print media and broadcasts for radio.

As a biographer, he has covered a diverse and eclectic range of subjects, including:

- Henri Cartier-Bresson, the legendary photographer
- Marcel Dassault, the aeronautics pioneer
- Gaston Gallimard, the publisher
- Hergé, the creator of The Adventures of Tintin
- Daniel-Henry Kahnweiler, the art dealer
- Georges Simenon, the detective novelist and creator of Inspector Maigret

Several of these books have been translated into English and the Henri Cartier-Bresson biography has been translated into Chinese.

As a journalist, Assouline has worked for the leading French publications Lire and Le Nouvel Observateur. He also publishes a blog, "La république des livres".

Assouline was the editor of La Révolution Wikipédia, a collection of essays about Wikipedia by postgraduate journalism students under his supervision. Assouline contributed the preface.

In January 2007 Assouline published a blog post criticizing Wikipedia's article on the Dreyfus Affair.
