= The Broken Ear =

Comic album by Belgian cartoonist Hergé

The Broken Ear (L'Oreille cassée)
- Cover of the English edition
- Date: 1937 (black and white); 1943 (colour)
- Series: The Adventures of Tintin
- Publisher: Casterman

Creative team
- Creator: Hergé

Original publication
- Published in: Le Petit Vingtième
- Date of publication: 5 December 1935 – 25 February 1937
- Language: French

Translation
- Publisher: Methuen
- Date: 1975
- Translator: Leslie Lonsdale-Cooper; Michael Turner

Chronology
- Preceded by: The Blue Lotus (1936)
- Followed by: The Black Island (1938)

The Broken Ear (French: L'Oreille cassée, originally published in English as Tintin and the Broken Ear) is the sixth volume of The Adventures of Tintin, the comics series by the Belgian cartoonist Hergé. Commissioned by the conservative Belgian newspaper Le Vingtième Siècle for its children's supplement Le Petit Vingtième, it was serialised weekly from December 1935 to February 1937. The story tells of young Belgian reporter Tintin and his dog Snowy, as he searches for a stolen South American fetish, identifiable by its broken right ear, and deals with other thieves who are after it. In doing so, he ends up in the fictional nation of San Theodoros in South America, where he becomes embroiled in a war and discovers the Arumbaya tribe deep in the forest.

The Broken Ear was a commercial success and was published in book form shortly after its conclusion. Hergé continued The Adventures of Tintin with The Black Island, while the series itself became a defining part of the Franco-Belgian comics tradition. In 1943, The Broken Ear was coloured and reformatted for republication by Casterman. Commentators have praised the book for showcasing Hergé's newly-found commitment to a clear narrative structure and striving for historical and technical accuracy. The Broken Ear introduces the recurring character General Alcazar, and was the first to include fictional countries. The story was adapted for both the 1956 Belvision animation, Hergé's Adventures of Tintin, and for the 1991 Ellipse/Nelvana animated series The Adventures of Tintin.

== Synopsis ==
A fetish created by the Arumbaya natives of South America is stolen from Brussels' Museum of Ethnography, only to be returned the following day. Tintin realizes that the replacement is a fake, and draws a connection with a local sculptor, Jacob Balthazar, who has just been murdered. Balthazar's parrot – the only witness to the murder – is obtained by two Hispanic men, Alonso and Ramón, who try to kill Tintin when he begins to investigate their connection to the crime. From the parrot, Alonso and Ramón discover Balthazar's murderer is Rodrigo Tortilla, and they proceed to follow him aboard a ship bound for South America. There, they murder Tortilla, but find that he did not have the original fetish. Tintin, however, follows them, and arranges their arrest when the ship docks at Los Dopicos, capital of San Theodoros. Nevertheless, the corrupt colonel in charge of the arrest allows the antagonists to slip away, and detains Tintin.

In the city, Tintin is framed as a terrorist, arrested, and sentenced to death by firing squad. Tintin survives when a revolution topples the government, and the new leader, General Alcazar, appoints Tintin to be his aide-de-camp. Alonso and Ramón capture Tintin, and interrogate him in the hope of locating the missing fetish, but they only end up briefly put behind bars by him. As aide-de-camp, Tintin opposes the proposed decision of San Theodoros claiming the supposedly oil rich Gran Chapo, as this would cause a war between San Theodoros and neighboring Nuevo Rico, and he is framed as a traitor by warmongering oil and weapon companies. Nevertheless, Tintin's new friend Pablo frees him from imprisonment, allowing for Tintin to flee to Nuevo Rico. However, in the process, he inadvertently causes events that have Nuevo Rico start a war between it and San Theodoros.

Once within Nuevo Rico, Tintin decides to enter the forest and find the Arumbaya tribe, hoping they can explain to him why people wish to steal the fetish. Finding a British explorer, Ridgewell, living among the Arumbaya, Tintin learns that a diamond was hidden inside the statue. At the check-in counter, Tintin and Snowy are due to leave South America for Europe but miss the ferry crossing as they have to wait for another week. As the war between San Theodoros and Nuevo Rico ends when Gran Chapo is discovered to have no oil, Tintin returns to Belgium after a brief encounter with Alonso and Ramón. There, Tintin discovers Balthazar's brother has been producing a range of exact replicas of the fetish, which he had discovered among his deceased brother's belongings. Tintin learns it was purchased from him by Samuel Goldbarr, a wealthy American now returning to the United States with it by ship. Catching up to the boat, Tintin finds Alonso and Ramón aboard. His struggle with them for the possession of the fetish results in it smashing on the floor, and the diamond hidden in it rolling overboard into the sea. Alonso and Ramón try to kill Tintin for making them lose it, and the three of them accidentally fall overboard as well. Tintin is rescued, but Alonso and Ramón drown. Goldbarr allows Tintin to return the stolen fetish to the museum, where it is repaired and put back on display, albeit comically damaged.

== History ==
=== Background and research ===
Georges Remi—best known under the pen name Hergé—was employed as editor and illustrator of Le Petit Vingtième ("The Little Twentieth"), a children's supplement to Le Vingtième Siècle ("The Twentieth Century"), a staunchly Roman Catholic, conservative Belgian newspaper based in Hergé's native Brussels which was run by the Abbé Norbert Wallez. In 1929, Hergé began The Adventures of Tintin comic strip for Le Petit Vingtième, revolving around the exploits of fictional Belgian reporter Tintin. Wallez ordered Hergé to set his first adventure in the Soviet Union as anti-socialist propaganda for children (Tintin in the Land of the Soviets), to set his second adventure in the Belgian Congo to encourage colonial sentiment (Tintin in the Congo), and to set his third adventure in the United States to use the story as a denunciation of American capitalism (Tintin in America). Wallez was subsequently removed from the paper's editorship following a scandal, although Hergé was convinced to stay on the condition of a salary increase. In preparing The Broken Ear, Hergé developed the new habit of keeping plot notes and ideas in a notebook. He also began making cuttings of photographs and other images from magazines and newspapers, filing them away for future use; he used them as a basis for many of the drawings in The Broken Ear.

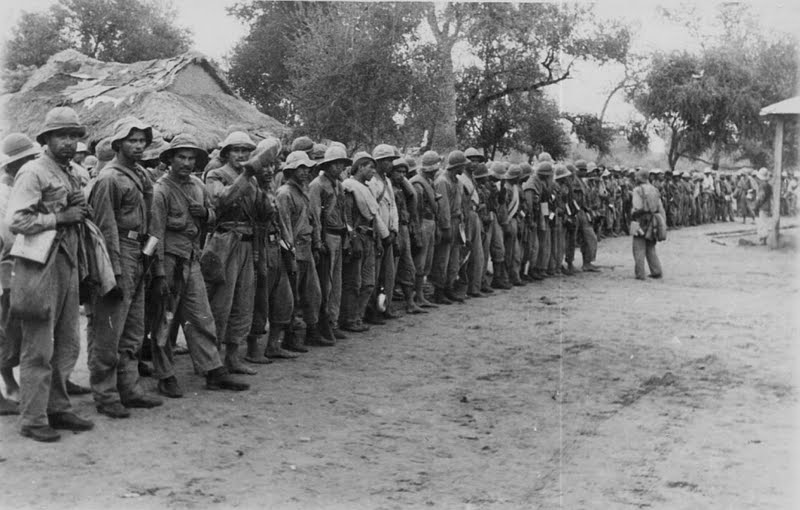
Paraguayan troops in Alihuatá, 1932, during the Chaco War

Hergé used The Broken Ear to allude to real events that had recently taken place in South America. The fictional countries of San Theodoros and Nuevo Rico were based on the real countries Bolivia and Paraguay, while the Gran Chapo War depicted in the strip was an allusion to the Chaco War (1932–35) that was waged between Bolivian and Paraguayan forces over lucrative oil fields in the Gran Chaco region. The name "Gran Chapo" was a pun on the French grand chapeau, meaning "big hat", while the name Nuevo Rico was a pun on nouveau riche and the name of the Nuevo Rican capital city, Sanfación, was a pun on sans façon, meaning "without manners". Hergé's character Basil Bazarov, of the Vicking Arms Company Ltd (Basil Mazaroff in the 1937 edition), was a thinly veiled allusion to the real-life Greek weapons seller Basil Zaharoff of Vickers Armstrong, who profited from the conflict by supplying arms to both Paraguay and Bolivia. Hergé had learned about the conflict and the western corporations profiting from it through two issues of anti-conformist French magazine Le Crapouillot (The Mortar Shell), which covered news stories ignored by the mainstream media. It is also likely that he had read Richard Lewinsohn's 1930 book Zaharoff, l'Européen mystérieux (Zaharoff, the Mysterious European), which had been referenced in Le Crapouillot.

Hergé's Arumbaya fetish was based on the design of a genuine Peruvian statue in Brussels' Royal Museums of Art and History; a pre-Columbian Chimu statue, it was made of wood and dated to between 1200 and 1438 CE. Whereas Hergé had access to speakers of Mandarin when creating The Blue Lotus, he had no access to speakers of indigenous Amerindian languages, and as such, the Arumbaya language that he developed was entirely fictitious. He based its structure largely on the Brusseleir dialect spoken in the Marolles area of Brussels, mixed with Spanish endings and constructions. In developing the Arumbaya's rivals, the Bibaros, he was influenced by anthropological accounts of head shrinking among the Jibaros tribes; when Leslie Lonsdale-Cooper and Michael Turner translated the book into English, they renamed the Bibaros as the Rumbabas, a pun on the rum baba pudding. The explorer Ridgewell, found living among the Arumbayas is based upon the British explorer Colonel Percy Harrison Fawcett, who mysteriously disappeared into the Amazon jungle in 1925.

In crafting the story, Hergé was possibly influenced by The Maltese Falcon, as there are similarities in their plots.

=== Original publication ===
A scene from The Broken Ear on the cover of Le Petit Vingtième

The Broken Ear was first serialised in Le Petit Vingtième from December 1935 under the title Les Nouvelles Aventures de Tintin et Milou (The New Adventures of Tintin and Snowy). From 7 February 1937, the story was also serialised in the French Catholic newspaper, Cœurs Vaillants under the name Tintin et Milou chez les Arumbayas (Tintin and Snowy among the Arumbayas). In 1937, it was collected in a single hardcover volume and published by Éditions Casterman under the title L'Oreille cassée (The Broken Ear). For this collected edition, one small change was made; the minor character of Carajo was renamed Caraco, because the word carajo is Spanish slang for penis, due to the fact Hergé had been unaware of its actual definition during the publication.

The Broken Ear introduced the character General Alcazar to the series, who went on to become a recurring character who appeared in three further Adventures. As noted by Hergé biographer Harry Thompson, The Broken Ear is the first story in the Tintin series to "start and finish in home surroundings" and the first to deal with the pursuit of a MacGuffin. It also marks the last story in which Tintin is seen taking part in journalistic activity and the first time that the Adventures featured Tintin's flat at 26 Labrador Road, in which Chinese mementos from The Blue Lotus are visible. Influenced by Alfred Hitchcock and his frequent cameo appearances in his own films, Hergé inserted an illustration of himself into the second frame. He also made reference to contemporary news stories in the book, having a radio announcer discuss the ongoing Second Italo-Ethiopian War at the start of the story; this was removed in the colour edition. At the end of the story, Hergé killed off Ramón and Alonso and depicted them being dragged to Hell by devils; this would mark the last depiction of the death(s) of a villain in the series until Colonel Boris Jorgen's death in Explorers on the Moon. This upset the editors of Cœurs Vaillants, who asked Hergé to change the scene; annoyed at their request, he later commented: "On the surface it cost me nothing, but that kind of addition was really difficult for me". For their serialisation of the story, he replaced that particular frame with one in which Tintin vouchsafed the souls of Ramón and Alonso for God.

=== Second version, 1943 ===
In the 1940s and 1950s, when Hergé's popularity had increased, he and his team at Studios Hergé redrew and coloured many of the original black-and-white Tintin adventures using the ligne claire ("clear line") (Note: Hergé himself did not use the term ligne claire to describe his drawing style. Cartoonist Joost Swarte first used the term in 1977.) drawing style he had developed so that they visually fitted in with the new Tintin stories being created. The Broken Ear was the first of these early Adventures to undergo the reformatting and colouration, and this second edition was published as a 62-page volume by Casterman in 1943. Unlike some of the earlier adventures, The Broken Ear was not redrawn, save for a few minor revisions. To reduce the length of the book, various sections were excised, including a dream sequence that appeared in the original. As the colouration process was new to the series, the use of colour in The Broken Ear is more basic than in later volumes; as the book progresses, it is evident that Hergé lost interest and rushed the task, for instance, resorting to using block colour backgrounds without any detail.

=== Later publications and legacy ===
Casterman republished the original black-and-white version in 1979 in a French-language collected volume with Cigars of the Pharaoh and The Blue Lotus, the second part of the Archives Hergé collection. In 1986, Casterman published a facsimile version of the original.

Hergé returned to creating fictional nations as allusions to real countries in subsequent Adventures, such as Syldavia and Borduria (based largely on Yugoslavia and Nazi Germany) in King Ottokar's Sceptre and Sondonesia (based on Indonesia) in Flight 714 to Sydney. He also re-used other elements pioneered in The Broken Ear in his later Adventures: a parrot in The Castafiore Emerald, a ravine crash in The Calculus Affair, a fireball and vivid dream in The Seven Crystal Balls, and a firing squad in Tintin and the Picaros. Tintin returned to San Theodores in Tintin and the Picaros, in which the characters Pablo and Ridgewell also made a reappearance.

In 1979, the Palace of Fine Arts in Brussels held an exhibition marking fifty years of The Adventures of Tintin. As part of this, they included artefacts that featured in the series, with the broken-eared Peruvian statue that inspired Hergé's Arumbaya fetish as the centre piece of the show; however, they feared that it might be stolen, so a replica was exhibited rather than the genuine article. Imitating the events of The Broken Ear, a thief broke in and stole the statue. A letter was then sent to Le Soir in which an individual alleging to be the thief stated that the item would be returned if Hergé returned to the scene of the crime at a certain time with a copy of the book under his right arm. Hergé did so, but carried the book under his left arm; the thief never appeared, and the replica fetish was never recovered.

== Critical analysis ==
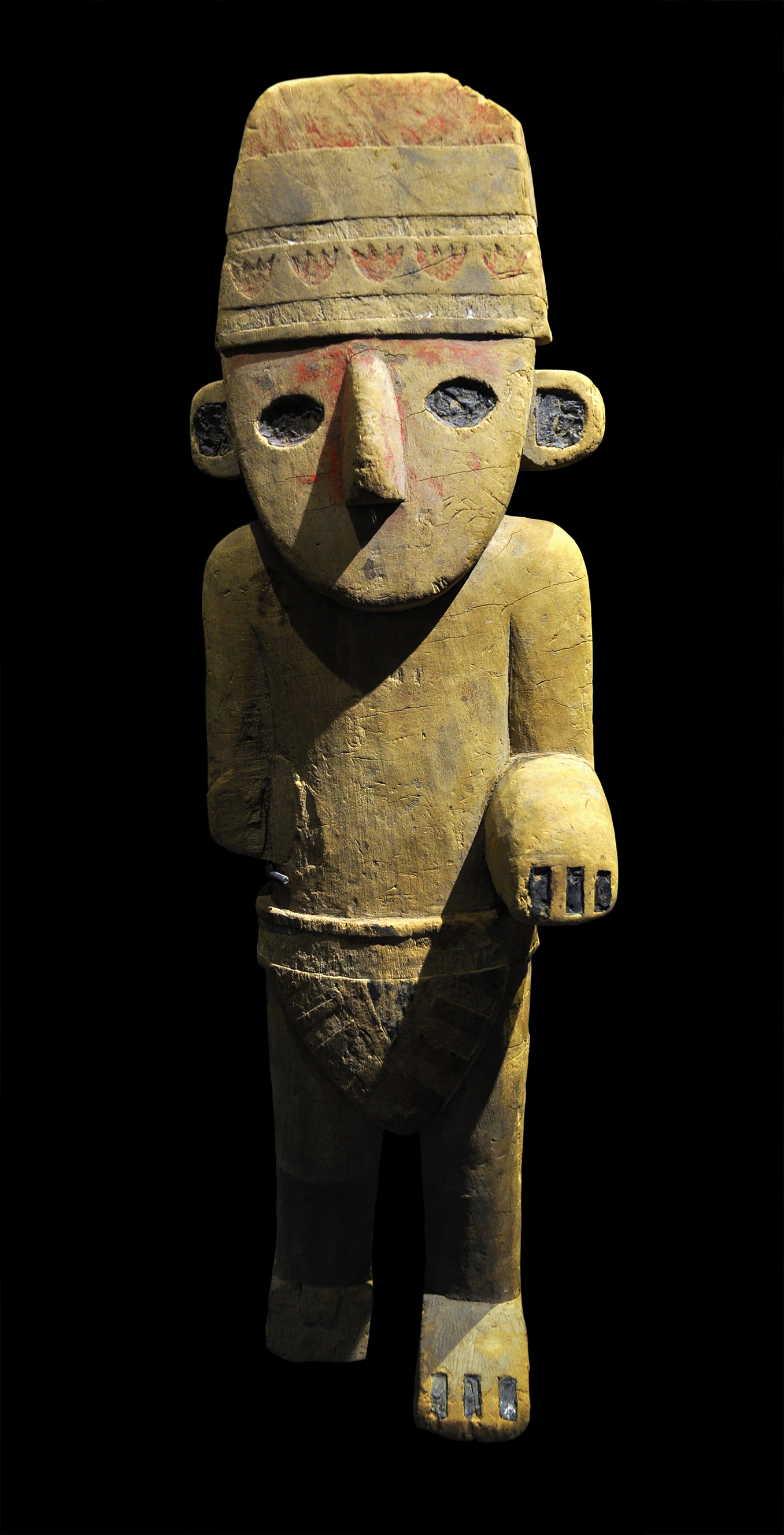
The Chimú statuette from the Cinquantenaire Museum that was copied into the adventure by Hergé.

Jean-Marc and Randy Lofficier described The Broken Ear as "a Blue Lotus-lite", noting that it shared many elements with the previous Adventure, although they also considered it to be "more reminiscent of the earlier, more caricatured books" like Tintin in the Congo and Tintin in America with the inclusion of comical natives and absurdist elements like "comical bombs". They nevertheless thought that it exhibited a "marked improvement" in Hergé's use of plotting, noting that the story was clearly structured, praising the "very effective, dramatic story, with plenty of twists". Overall, they awarded The Broken Ear two stars out of five. Harry Thompson felt that The Broken Ear had a "slightly lacklustre quality" to it, and was "disappointing" due to the fact that the "various elements don't gel well together". He believed that the artistic quality and the use of research deteriorated as the Adventure progressed, although it had "the most complex plot yet, by a long way". Philippe Goddin asserted that in the story, Tintin develops from a "classic reporter to an investigative journalist."

Michael Farr described The Broken Ear as a "moral condemnation of capitalism, imperialism and war", although felt that it was "not as perfectly constructed" as The Blue Lotus, being "less detailed and realistic". He thought that the image in which Ramón and Alonso drown in the sea and are dragged to Hell by demons was "truly medieval" and represented the "most fanciful image" in the entire series. He also opined that Hergé's depiction of South American militaries was "full of humour" and that the detail was "generally very accurate". Biographer Benoît Peeters thought that The Broken Ear was a return to "pure adventure" from the "quasi-documentary realism" of The Blue Lotus, and that in this Adventure, politics remains "in the second line", and that instead Hergé let "the narrative rip and succeeds marvellously". Elsewhere, he praised the work as having a "formidable dynamism" and an "unequaled vitality", containing a "revolution" in narrative structure. He thought that it served as a "perfect metaphor" for the theories of German philosopher Walter Benjamin published in The Work of Art in the Age of Mechanical Reproduction (1936), which Hergé had not read. Literary critic Tom McCarthy thought that Balthazar was an example of the interesting minor characters that imbue the Adventures, commenting that his "down-at-heel garret speaks volumes of loneliness and semi-realised artistry". He also opined that the diamond within the fetish was the clitoris of the Arumbaya, describing it as "their pleasure, wrapped up in a fetish". He also thought that there was a homosexual subtext between Ramón and Alonso, believing that the scene in which a bullet was fired into Ramón's buttocks was symbolic of anal sex.

Writing in Libération, the philosopher Michel Serres opined that The Broken Ear was "a treatise on fetishism". Literary critic Jean-Marie Apostolidès of Stanford University believed that The Broken Ear established a "tintinian" anthropology that would remain throughout the rest of the series. As part of this, Apostolidès argued, Hergé distances himself from western values and looks at his own society as an outsider, accomplishing what Roger Caillois called "sociological revolution". He felt that the comic was "more contrived" and "more superficial" than the previous Adventures, and that here Tintin loses his position as "the sole point of identification" for the reader, with the other characters becoming more identifiable. Opining that there was a constant theme of twos throughout the story (i.e. the real and the fake fetish, Alonso and Ramón), he thought that the character of Ridgewell was "a kind of Tintin, grown old among the natives, solitary and ill humored", noting that Ridgewell's position among the Arumbayas was akin to Tintin's position among the Ba Baorom in Congo. Apostolidès also argued that in the comic, Alcazar was a religious figure, who attained a "sacred" quality through the spilling of blood in his revolt against General Tapioca's government. As part of this, he argued that the threats of assassination would make him a martyr, or a "holy king".

== Adaptations ==
The Broken Ear is one of The Adventures of Tintin that were adapted for the first series of the animated Hergé's Adventures of Tintin by the Belgian studio Belvision in 1957, directed by Ray Goossens and written by Michel Greg. The Broken Ear was divided up into six 5-minute black-and-white episodes that diverted from Hergé's original plot in a variety of ways.

It was also adapted into a 1991 episode of The Adventures of Tintin television series by French studio Ellipse and Canadian animation company Nelvana. Directed by Stéphane Bernasconi, Thierry Wermuth voiced the character of Tintin. The episode deviates significantly from the original story line. The passage containing Tintin's drunkenness has been ignored entirely, keeping the character consistent with how it is seen in the rest of series - upright, conscientious and of commendable moral standards. Besides, the political narratives, almost ubiquitously present in the latter part of the original album, have also been largely overlooked. Tintin's conflict with the military was also replaced with one with Alonso Pérez and Ramón Bada. Pérez and Bada do not die at the end of the story, as occurs in the album, but are rescued by Tintin as he is retrieved from the sea by the ship's crew, and taken to prison.

Tintin critic Tom McCarthy stated in an interview that the plot of his novel Men in Space was "more or less lifted straight" from The Broken Ear. Like The Broken Ear, Men in Space concerns an artist hired to reproduce a priceless artwork; however he ultimately produces more than one copy, fooling the conspirators.
