= The Adventures of Tintin =

Series of 24 comic albums by Hergé

- The main characters of The Adventures of Tintin from left to right: Professor Calculus, Captain Haddock, Tintin and Snowy, Thomson and Thompson, and Bianca Castafiore
- Created by: Hergé

Publication information
- Publisher: Casterman; Le Lombard; Egmont Group; Little, Brown and Company
Title(s)
- Tintin in the Land of the Soviets (1930)
- Tintin in the Congo (1931)
- Tintin in America (1932)
- Cigars of the Pharaoh (1934)
- The Blue Lotus (1936)
- The Broken Ear (1937)
- The Black Island (1938)
- King Ottokar's Sceptre (1939)
- The Crab with the Golden Claws (1941)
- The Shooting Star (1942)
- The Secret of the Unicorn (1943)
- Red Rackham's Treasure (1944)
- The Seven Crystal Balls (1948)
- Prisoners of the Sun (1949)
- Land of Black Gold (1950)
- Destination Moon (1953)
- Explorers on the Moon (1954)
- The Calculus Affair (1956)
- The Red Sea Sharks (1958)
- Tintin in Tibet (1960)
- The Castafiore Emerald (1963)
- Flight 714 to Sydney (1968)
- Tintin and the Picaros (1976)
- Tintin and Alph-Art (1986)
- Formats: Original material for the series has been published as a strip in the comics anthology(s): Le Petit Vingtième (newspaper supplement, 1929–1940); Le Soir (newspaper, 1940–1944); Tintin (magazine, 1946-–1976); and a set of graphic novels.
- Original language: French
- Genre: Action/adventure
- Publication date: 1929–1976
- Main character(s): Tintin; Snowy (Milou); Captain Haddock; Professor Calculus (Tryphon Tournesol); Thomson and Thompson (Dupond and Dupont); Bianca Castafiore

Creative team
- Writer(s): Hergé
- Artist(s): Hergé; Uncredited: Bob de Moor; Edgar P. Jacobs; Jacques Martin; Roger Leloup
- Colourist(s): Edgar P. Jacobs; Josette Baujot; Fanny Rodwell; (all uncredited)

The Adventures of Tintin (French: Les Aventures de Tintin [lez‿avɑ̃tyʁ də tɛ̃tɛ̃]) is a series of 24 comic albums written and illustrated by Belgian cartoonist Hergé (pen name of Georges Remi). One of the most popular European comics of the 20th century, Tintin had been published in more than 70 languages with sales of more than 200 million copies by 2007, with the series also having been adapted for radio, television, theatre, and film.

The series debuted in French on 10 January 1929 in Le Petit Vingtième, a youth supplement to the Belgian newspaper Le Vingtième Siècle. The success of the series led to serialised strips published in Belgium's leading newspaper Le Soir and spun into a successful Tintin magazine. In 1950, Hergé created Studios Hergé, which produced the canonical versions of ten Tintin albums. Following Hergé's death in 1983, the final installment of the series, Tintin and Alph-Art, was released posthumously.

Set in the contemporary world, the series focuses on the titular Tintin, a courageous young Belgian reporter and adventurer aided by his faithful dog Snowy (Milou in the original French publication). Other allies include the brash and cynical Captain Haddock, the intelligent but hard-of-hearing Professor Calculus (French: Professeur Tournesol), incompetent detectives Thomson and Thompson (French: Dupont et Dupond), and the opera diva Bianca Castafiore.

The series has been praised for its clean, expressive drawings in Hergé's signature ligne claire ("clear line") style. Its well-researched plots straddle a variety of genres: swashbuckling adventures with elements of fantasy, mysteries, political thrillers, and science fiction. The stories feature slapstick humour, offset by dashes of political or cultural commentary.

== History ==
=== Le Vingtième Siècle: 1929–1939 ===
"The idea for the character of Tintin and the sort of adventures that would befall him came to me, I believe, in five minutes, the moment I first made a sketch of the figure of this hero: that is to say, he had not haunted my youth nor even my dreams. Although it's possible that as a child I imagined myself in the role of a sort of Tintin".

— Hergé, 15 November 1966.

Georges Prosper Remi, best known under the pen name Hergé, was employed as an illustrator at Le Vingtième Siècle (The Twentieth Century), a staunchly Roman Catholic, conservative Belgian newspaper based in Hergé's native Brussels. Run by the Abbé Norbert Wallez, the paper described itself as a "Catholic Newspaper for Doctrine and Information" and disseminated a fascist viewpoint. Wallez appointed Hergé editor of a new Thursday youth supplement, titled Le Petit Vingtième ("The Little Twentieth"). Propagating Wallez's sociopolitical views to its young readership, it contained explicitly pro-fascist and antisemitic sentiment. In addition to editing the supplement, Hergé illustrated L'extraordinaire aventure de Flup, Nénesse, Poussette et Cochonnet (The Extraordinary Adventure of Flup, Nénesse, Poussette and Cochonnet), a comic strip authored by a member of the newspaper's sport staff. Dissatisfied with this, Hergé wanted to write and draw his own cartoon strip.

He already had experience creating comic strips. From July 1926, he had written a strip about a Boy Scout patrol leader titled Les Aventures de Totor C.P. des Hannetons (The Adventures of Totor, Scout Leader of the Cockchafers) for the Scouting newspaper Le Boy Scout Belge (The Belgian Boy Scout). Totor was a strong influence on Tintin, with Hergé describing the latter as being like Totor's younger brother. Jean-Marc and Randy Lofficier stated that graphically, Totor and Tintin were "virtually identical" except for the Scout uniform, also noting many similarities between their respective adventures, particularly in the illustration style, the fast pace of the story, and the use of humour. He was fascinated by new techniques in the medium such as the systematic use of speech bubbles—found in such American comics as George McManus' Bringing up Father, George Herriman's Krazy Kat, and Rudolph Dirks's Katzenjammer Kids, copies of which had been sent to him from Mexico by the paper's reporter Léon Degrelle.

The front page of the 1 May 1930 edition of Le Petit Vingtième, declaring "Tintin revient!" ("Tintin Returns!") from his adventure in the Soviet Union.

Although Hergé wanted to send Tintin to the United States, Wallez ordered him to set his adventure in the Soviet Union, in order to create antisocialist propaganda for children. The result, Tintin in the Land of the Soviets, was serialised in Le Petit Vingtième from January 1929 to May 1930. Popular in Francophone Belgium, Wallez organised a publicity stunt at the Paris Gare du Nord railway station, following which he organised the publication of the story in book form. The story's popularity led to an increase in sales, so Wallez granted Hergé two assistants. In Tintin in the Land of the Soviets, the Bolsheviks are presented as villains. Hergé drew on Moscow Unveiled, a work given to him by Wallez and authored by Joseph Douillet, the former Belgian consul in Russia, that is highly critical of the Soviet regime, although Hergé contextualised this by noting that in Belgium, at the time a devout Catholic nation, "anything Bolshevik was atheist". In the story, Bolshevik leaders are motivated by personal greed and a desire to deceive the world. Tintin discovers, buried, "the hideout where Lenin, Trotsky, and Stalin have collected together wealth stolen from the people". The Economist stated that while the book is "crude", "the land of hunger and tyranny painted by Hergé was uncannily accurate."

At Wallez's direction, in June Hergé began serialisation of the second story, Tintin in the Congo, designed to encourage colonial sentiment towards the Belgian Congo. Authored in a paternalistic style that depicted the Congolese as childlike idiots, in later decades it was accused of racism, but at the time was uncontroversial and popular, and further publicity stunts were held to increase sales.

For the third adventure, Tintin in America, serialised from September 1931 to October 1932, Hergé finally got to deal with a scenario of his own choice, and used the work to push an anti-capitalist, anti-consumerist agenda in keeping with the paper's ultraconservative ideology. The Adventures of Tintin had been syndicated to a Catholic magazine named Cœurs Vaillants (Brave Hearts) since 1930, and Hergé was soon receiving syndication requests from Swiss and Portuguese newspapers, too.

Hergé wrote a string of Adventures of Tintin, sending his character to real locations such as the Belgian Congo, United States, Egypt, India, Tibet, China, and the United Kingdom. He also sent Tintin to fictional countries of his own devising, such as the Latin American republic of San Theodoros, the East European kingdom of Syldavia, or the fascist state of Borduria—whose leader's name, Müsstler, was a portmanteau of the names of the Nazi German Führer Adolf Hitler and the Italian Fascist Prime Minister Benito Mussolini.

=== Le Soir: 1940–1945 ===
In May 1940, Nazi Germany invaded Belgium as World War II spread further across Europe. Although Hergé briefly fled to France and was considered a self-imposed exile, he ultimately decided to return to his occupied homeland. For political reasons, the Nazi authorities closed down Le Vingtième Siècle, leaving Hergé unemployed. In search of employment, he got a job as an illustrator at Belgium's leading newspaper, Le Soir (The Evening), which was allowed to continue publication under German management. On 17 October 1940, he was made editor of the children's supplement, Le Soir Jeunesse, in which he set about producing new Tintin adventures. In this new, more repressive political climate of German-occupied Belgium, Hergé could no longer politicize The Adventures of Tintin lest he be arrested by the Gestapo. As Harry Thompson noted, Tintin's role as a reporter came to an end, to be replaced by his new role as an explorer. The serialized publication of Land of Black Gold, which was being released in the years immediately preceding the occupation, was put on hold and its publication would not resume until 1948. Six other stories were released in the meantime, which were notably absent of any explicitly political plot or commentary.

=== Le Journal de Tintin: 1946–1983 ===
In September 1944, the Allies entered Brussels and Hergé's German employers fled. Le Soir was shut down and The Adventures of Tintin was put on hold. Then in 1946, Hergé accepted an invitation from Belgian comic publisher Raymond Leblanc and his new publishing company Le Lombard to continue The Adventures of Tintin in the new Le journal de Tintin (Tintin magazine). Hergé quickly learned that he no longer had the independence he preferred; he was required to produce two coloured pages a week for Leblanc's magazine, a tall order.

In 1950, Hergé began to poach the better members of the Tintin magazine staff to work in the large house on Avenue Louise that contained the fledgling Studios Hergé. Bob De Moor (who imitated Hergé's style and did half the work), Guy Dessicy (colourist), and Marcel DeHaye (secretary) were the nucleus. To this, Hergé added Jacques Martin (imitated Hergé's style), Roger Leloup (detailed, realistic drawings), Eugène Evany (later chief of the Studios), Michel Demaret (letterer), and Baudouin Van Den Branden (secretary). As Harry Thompson observed, the idea was to turn the process of creating The Adventures of Tintin into a "veritable production line, the artwork passing from person to person, everyone knowing their part, like an artistic orchestra with Hergé conducting". The studios produced eight new Tintin albums for Tintin magazine, and coloured and reformatted two old Tintin albums. Studios Hergé continued to release additional publications until Hergé's death in 1983. In 1986, a 24th unfinished album was released, the studios were disbanded, and the assets were transferred to the Hergé Foundation.

== Characters ==
=== Tintin and Snowy ===
Tintin is a young Belgian reporter and adventurer who becomes involved in dangerous cases in which he takes heroic action to save the day. The Adventures may feature Tintin hard at work in his investigative journalism, but seldom is he seen actually turning in a story. Readers and critics have described Tintin as a well-rounded yet open-ended, intelligent, and creative character, noting that his lack of backstory and neutral personality permits a reflection of the evil, folly, and foolhardiness which surrounds him. The character never compromises his Boy Scout ideals, which represent Hergé's own, and his status allows the reader to assume his position within the story, rather than merely following the adventures of a strong protagonist. Tintin's cartoonish representation against more realistic backgrounds enhances this aspect, with Scott McCloud noting that it "allows readers to mask themselves in a character and safely enter a sensually stimulating world".

Snowy (Milou in Hergé's original version), a white Wire Fox Terrier dog, is Tintin's loyal companion. Like Captain Haddock, Snowy is fond of Loch Lomond brand Scotch whisky, and his occasional bouts of drinking tend to get him into unintentional trouble, as does his only fear: arachnids.

=== Captain Haddock ===
Captain Archibald Haddock (Capitaine Haddock in Hergé's original version) is a Merchant Marine sea captain and Tintin's best friend. Introduced in The Crab with the Golden Claws, Haddock is initially depicted as a weak and alcoholic character, but later evolves to become genuinely heroic and even a socialite after he finds a treasure from his ancestor, Sir Francis Haddock (Chevalier François de Hadoque). The Captain's coarse humanity and sarcasm act as a counterpoint to Tintin's often-implausible heroism; he is always quick with a dry comment whenever the boy reporter seems too idealistic. The hot-tempered Haddock uses a range of colourful insults and curses to express his feelings, such as "billions of bilious blue blistering barnacles!" (Mille milliards de mille sabords!) or "ten thousand thundering typhoons!"

=== Professor Calculus ===
Professor Cuthbert Calculus (Professeur Tryphon Tournesol in Hergé's original version; tournesol is the French word for 'sunflower') is an absent-minded and partially deaf physicist and a regular character alongside Tintin, Snowy, and Captain Haddock. He was introduced in Red Rackham's Treasure, and based partially on Auguste Piccard, a Swiss physicist.

=== Supporting characters ===
"Everybody wants to be Tintin: generation after generation. In a world of Rastapopouloses, Tricklers and Carreidases—or, more prosaically, Jolyon Waggs and Bolt-the-builders—Tintin represents an unattainable ideal of goodness, cleanness, authenticity".

— Literary critic Tom McCarthy, 2006

Hergé's supporting characters have been cited as far more developed than the central character, each imbued with strength of character and depth of personality, which has been compared with that of the characters of Charles Dickens. Hergé used the supporting characters to create a realistic world in which to set his protagonists' adventures. To further the realism and continuity, characters would recur throughout the series. The occupation of Belgium and the restrictions imposed upon Hergé forced him to focus on characterisation to avoid depicting troublesome political situations. As a result, the colourful supporting cast was developed during this period.

Thomson and Thompson (Dupont et Dupond in Hergé's original version) are two incompetent detectives who look like identical twins, their only discernible difference being the shape of their moustaches. First seen in Tintin in the Congo (as a cameo) and first properly introduced in Cigars of the Pharaoh, they provide much of the comic relief throughout the series, being afflicted with chronic spoonerisms. They are extremely clumsy, thoroughly incompetent, and usually bent on arresting the wrong character. The detectives usually wear bowler hats and carry walking sticks except when sent abroad; during those missions they attempt the national costume of the locality they are visiting, but instead dress in conspicuously stereotypical folkloric attire which makes them stand apart. The detectives were based partly on Hergé's father Alexis and uncle Léon, identical twins who often took walks together, wearing matching bowler hats while carrying matching walking sticks.

Bianca Castafiore is an opera singer of whom Haddock is terrified. She was first introduced in King Ottokar's Sceptre and seems to appear wherever the protagonists travel, along with her maid Irma and pianist Igor Wagner. Although amiable and strong-willed, she is also comically foolish, whimsical, absent-minded, talkative, and seemingly unaware that her voice is shrill and appallingly loud. Her speciality is the Jewel Song (Ah! Je ris de me voir si belle en ce miroir / Ah! My beauty past compare, these jewels bright I wear) from Gounod's opera Faust, which she sings at the least provocation. She is often maternal toward Haddock, of whose dislike she remains ignorant. She often confuses words, especially names, with other words that rhyme with them or of which they remind her; "Haddock" is frequently replaced by malapropisms such as "Paddock", "Stopcock", or "Hopscotch", while Nestor, Haddock's butler, is confused with "Chestor" and "Hector". Her own name means "white and chaste flower": a meaning to which Professor Calculus once refers when he breeds a white rose and names it for the singer. She was based upon opera divas in general (according to Hergé's perception), Hergé's Aunt Ninie (who was known for her "shrill" singing of opera), and, in the post-war comics, on Maria Callas.

Other recurring characters include Nestor the butler, Chang (or Chang Chong-Chen) the loyal Chinese boy, Rastapopoulos the criminal mastermind, Jolyon Wagg the infuriating (to Haddock) insurance salesman, General Alcazar the South American freedom fighter and (on and off) President of San Theodoros, Mohammed Ben Kalish Ezab the Arab emir, and Abdullah his mischievous son, Dr. Müller the evil German psychiatrist, Oliveira da Figueira the friendly Portuguese salesman, Cutts the butcher whose phone number is repeatedly confused with Haddock's, and Allan the henchman of Rastapopoulos and formerly Haddock's first mate.

== Settings ==
The settings within Tintin have also added depth to the strips. Hergé mixes real and fictional lands into his stories. In King Ottokar's Sceptre (revisited once more in Destination Moon, Explorers on the Moon and The Calculus Affair) Hergé creates two fictional countries, Syldavia and Borduria, and invites the reader to tour them in text through the insertion of a travel brochure into the storyline. Other fictional lands include Khemed on the Arabian Peninsula and San Theodoros, São Rico, and Nuevo Rico in South America, as well as the kingdom of Gaipajama in India. Apart from these fictitious locations, Tintin also visits real places such as Switzerland, the United Kingdom, the United States, the Soviet Union, Belgian Congo, Peru, India, Egypt, Morocco, Saudi Arabia, Indonesia, Iceland, Nepal, and China. Other actual locales used were the Sahara Desert, the Atlantic Ocean, and the Moon.

Fictional settings include:

- Black Island, an island off the Scottish coast, The Black Island
- / Borduria is the historical rival of Syldavia and attempts a fascist annexation similar to the 1938 Anschluss of Austria in King Ottokar's Sceptre. Borduria is ruled by the military dictator Marshal Kûrvi-Tasch, who oppresses his own people and attempts to influence Third World conflicts by sending "military advisors" to countries such as San Theodoros.
- Gran Chapo, after the South American Chaco region. The Broken Ear is set in a war inspired by the Chaco War.
- Khemed, in Arabia. Khemed is subject to a revolution in The Red Sea Sharks and in the Land of Black Gold.
- Nuevo Rico, bordering San Theodoros. The two countries go to war over oil in The Broken Ear, which is parallel to the 1930s Chaco War between Paraguay and Bolivia. The capital of Nuevo Rico is Sanfacion (a play on Asunción, which indicates that it is modelled upon Paraguay).
- San Theodoros in South America, a prototypical banana republic where US-based companies and Borduria (meant as an allusion to the Soviet Union or Cuba) vie for power, with "advisors" of local generals. The capital is Los Dopicos, which is later renamed Tapiocapolis.
- São Rico in South America. São Rico was added as a reference in a later versions of The Shooting Star. The original version had the villainous masterminds as stereotypical Jewish American puppet-masters; the later version darkens their skin tone and inserts São Rico as a reference.
- Most of the events of Flight 714 to Sydney take place on the island of Pulau-Pulau Bompa ("pulau-pulau" is Indonesian for "islands") involving people Hergé calls the Sondonesians. Said to be undergoing a civil war or a war for independence and now rebels for hire, the people may be based on separatist fighters of the Republic of South Maluku. It was a self-proclaimed republic of seismically active islands in the Molucca Sea, whose residents fought for independence from Indonesia in the 1950s and 1960s. The inclusion of Jakarta's Kemajoran Airport and the radio message from Makassar just before the plane is hijacked suggests that the location is within the Indonesian archipelago. The Sondonesians' conversations in the album are in Indonesian Malay (Indonesian). The Proboscis monkey, which appears in the album, is exclusive to Borneo.
- Syldavia in the Balkans is, by Hergé's own admission, modelled on Montenegro and is threatened by neighbouring Borduria (an attempted annexation appears in King Ottokar's Sceptre), a situation that parallels respectively Czechoslovakia or Austria and the expansionist Nazi Germany prior to World War II. Both Syldavia and Borduria are stereotyped Balkan countries. Syldavia is later home to Sprodj Atomic Centre, which launches the first rocket to the Moon.

== Research ==
Hergé's extensive research began with The Blue Lotus; Hergé said that "it was from that time that I undertook research and really interested myself in the people and countries to which I sent Tintin, out of a sense of responsibility to my readers".

Hergé's use of research and photographic reference allowed him to build a realised universe for Tintin, going so far as to create fictionalised countries, dressing them with specific political cultures. These were heavily informed by the cultures evident in Hergé's lifetime. Pierre Skilling has asserted that Hergé saw monarchy as "the legitimate form of government", noting that democratic "values seem underrepresented in [such] a classic Franco-Belgian strip". Syldavia in particular is described in considerable detail, Hergé creating a history, customs, and a language, which is actually a Slavic-looking transcript of Marols, a working-class Brussels dialect. He set the country in the Balkans, and it is, by his own admission, modelled after Albania. The country finds itself threatened by neighbouring Borduria, with an attempted annexation appearing in King Ottokar's Sceptre. This situation parallels the Italian conquest of Albania, and that of Czechoslovakia and Austria by expansionist Nazi Germany prior to World War II.

Hergé's use of research would include months of preparation for Tintin's voyage to the Moon in the two-part storyline spread across Destination Moon and Explorers on the Moon. His research for the storyline was noted in New Scientist: "The considerable research undertaken by Hergé enabled him to come very close to the type of space suit that would be used in future Moon exploration, although his portrayal of the type of rocket that was actually used was a long way off the mark". The Moon rocket is based on the German V-2 rockets.

== Influences ==
In his youth, Hergé admired Benjamin Rabier and suggested that a number of images within Tintin in the Land of the Soviets reflected his influence, particularly the pictures of animals. René Vincent, the Art Deco designer, also affected early Tintin adventures: "His influence can be detected at the beginning of the Soviets, where my drawings are designed along a decorative line, like an 'S'". Hergé also readily adopted the image of round noses from George McManus, feeling they were "so much fun that I used them, without scruples!"

During the extensive research Hergé carried out for The Blue Lotus, he became influenced by Chinese and Japanese illustrative styles and woodcuts. This is especially noticeable in the seascapes, which are reminiscent of works by Hokusai and Hiroshige.

Hergé also declared Mark Twain an influence, although this admiration may have led him astray when depicting Incas as having no knowledge of an upcoming solar eclipse in Prisoners of the Sun, an error T. F. Mills attributed to an attempt to portray "Incas in awe of a latter-day 'Connecticut Yankee'".

== Translation into English ==
=== British ===
Tintin first appeared in English in the weekly British children's comic Eagle in 1951 with the story King Ottokar's Sceptre. (Note: Tintin first appeared in Eagle Vol 2:17 (3 August), which ran in weekly parts in the lower half of the centerfold, beneath the cutaway drawings, until Vol 3:4 (2 May 1952).) It was translated in conjunction with Casterman, Tintin's publishers, and starts by describing Tintin as "a French boy". Snowy was called by his French name Milou.

The process of translating Tintin into British English was then commissioned in 1958 by Methuen, Hergé's British publishers. It was a joint operation, headed by Leslie Lonsdale-Cooper and Michael Turner, who worked closely with Hergé to attain a translation as true as possible to the original work. Due in part to the large amount of language-specific word play (such as punning) in the series, especially the jokes which played on Professor Calculus' partial deafness, it was never the intention to translate literally; instead they strove to fashion a work whose idioms and jokes would be meritorious in their own right. Despite the free hand Hergé afforded the two, they worked closely with the original text, asking for regular assistance to understand Hergé's intentions.

The British translations were also Anglicised to appeal to British customs and values. Milou, for example, was renamed Snowy at the translators' discretion. Captain Haddock's Le château de Moulinsart was renamed Marlinspike Hall.

When it came time to translate The Black Island, which is set in Great Britain, the opportunity was taken to redraw the entire book. Methuen had decided that the book did not portray Great Britain accurately enough and had compiled a list of 131 errors of detail which needed to be put right, such as ensuring that the British police were unarmed and ensuring that scenes of the British countryside would be acceptable to British readers. The resulting 1966 album is the dramatically updated and redrawn version most commonly available today. As of the early 21st century, Egmont publishes Tintin books in the United Kingdom and elsewhere.

=== American ===
The Tintin books have had relatively limited popularity in the United States.

The works were first adapted for the American English market by Golden Books, a branch of the Western Publishing Company in the 1950s. The albums were translated from French into American English with some artwork panels blanked except for the speech balloons. This was done to remove content considered to be inappropriate for children, such as drunkenness and free mixing of races. The albums were not popular and only six were published in mixed order. The edited albums later had their blanked areas redrawn by Hergé to be more acceptable, and they currently appear this way in published editions around the world.

From 1966 to 1979, Children's Digest included monthly installments of The Adventures of Tintin. These serialisations served to increase Tintin's popularity, introducing him to many thousands of new readers in the United States. (Note: At that time, Children's Digest had a circulation of around 700,000 copies monthly.)

Atlantic Monthly Press, in cooperation with Little, Brown and Company beginning in the 1970s, republished the albums based on the British translations. Alterations were made to vocabulary not well known to an American audience (such as gaol, tyre, saloon, and spanner). As of the early 21st century, Little, Brown and Company (owned by the Hachette Book Group USA) continues to publish Tintin books in the United States.

=== Digital ===
Moulinsart's official Tintin app in Apple's App Store, launched with the release of the digital version of Tintin in the Congo on 5 June 2015, features brand new English language translations by journalist, writer and Tintin expert Michael Farr.

In 2021, an unused original painting by Hergé for the cover of The Blue Lotus sold at auction for a record 3.2 million euros. The image was later used by Tintinimaginatio to launch the franchise's first non-fungible token (NFT) in an effort to digitalize the brand and reclaim ownership of the artwork.

=== Lettering and typography ===
The English-language Adventures of Tintin books were originally published with handwritten lettering created by cartographer Neil Hyslop. 1958's The Crab with the Golden Claws was the first to be published with Hyslop's lettering. Hyslop was given versions of Hergé's artwork with blank panels. Hyslop would write his English script on a clear cellophane-like material, aiming to fit within the original speech bubble. Occasionally the size of the bubbles would need to be adjusted if the translated text would not fit. In the early 2000s, Tintin's English publishers Egmont discontinued publishing books featuring Hyslop's handwritten lettering, instead publishing books with text created with digital fonts. This change was instigated by publisher Casterman and Hergé's estate managers Moulinsart, who decided to replace localised hand-lettering with a single computerised font for all Tintin titles worldwide.

== Reception ==
=== Awards ===
On 1 June 2006, the Dalai Lama bestowed the International Campaign for Tibet's Light of Truth Award upon the Hergé Foundation, along with South African Archbishop Desmond Tutu. The award was in recognition of Hergé's book Tintin in Tibet, Hergé's most personal adventure, which the executive director of ICT Europe Tsering Jampa noted was "for many ... their introduction to the awe-inspiring landscape and culture of Tibet". In 2001, the Hergé Foundation demanded the recall of the Chinese translation of the work, which had been released with the title Tintin in Chinese Tibet. The work was subsequently published with the correct translation of the title. Accepting on behalf of the Hergé Foundation, Hergé's widow Fanny Rodwell said: "We never thought that this story of friendship would have a resonance more than 40 years later".

=== Literary criticism ===
The study of Tintin, sometimes referred to as "Tintinology", has become the life work of some literary critics in Belgium, France and the United Kingdom. Belgian author Philippe Goddin has written Hergé et Tintin reporters: Du Petit Vingtième au Journal Tintin (1986, later republished in English as Hergé and Tintin Reporters: From "Le Petit Vingtième" to "Tintin" Magazine in 1987) and Hergé et les Bigotudos (1993) amongst other books on the series. In 1983, French author Benoît Peeters released Le Monde d'Hergé, subsequently published in English as Tintin and the World of Hergé in 1988. English reporter Michael Farr has written works such as Tintin, 60 Years of Adventure (1989), Tintin: The Complete Companion (2001), Tintin & Co. (2007) and The Adventures of Hergé (2007), while English television producer Harry Thompson authored Tintin: Hergé and his Creation (1991).

Literary critics, primarily in French-speaking Europe, have also examined The Adventures of Tintin. In 1984, Jean-Marie Apostolidès published his study of the Adventures of Tintin from a more "adult" perspective as Les Métamorphoses de Tintin, published in English as The Metamorphoses of Tintin, or Tintin for Adults in 2010. In reviewing Apostolidès' book, Nathan Perl-Rosenthal of The New Republic thought that it was "not for the faint of heart: it is densely-packed with close textual analysis and laden with psychological jargon". Following Apostolidès's work, French psychoanalyst Serge Tisseron examined the series in his books Tintin et les Secrets de Famille ("Tintin and the Family Secrets"), which was published in 1990, and Tintin et le Secret d'Hergé ("Tintin and Hergé's Secret"), published in 1993.

The first English-language work of literary criticism devoted to the series was Tintin and the Secret of Literature, written by the novelist Tom McCarthy and published in 2006. McCarthy compares Hergé's work with that of Aeschylus, Honoré de Balzac, Joseph Conrad, and Henry James and argues that the series contains the key to understanding literature itself. McCarthy considered the Adventures of Tintin to be "stupendously rich", containing "a mastery of plot and symbol, theme and sub-text" which, influenced by Tisseron's psychoanalytical readings of the work, he believed could be deciphered to reveal a series of recurring themes, ranging from bartering to implicit sexual intercourse that Hergé had featured throughout the series. Reviewing the book in The Telegraph, Toby Clements argued that McCarthy's work, and literary criticism of Hergé's comic strips in general, cut "perilously close" to simply feeding "the appetite of those willing to cross the line between enthusiast and obsessive" in the Tintinological community.

=== Controversy ===
The early Adventures of Tintin depicted controversial images, which Hergé later described as "a transgression of my youth". In 1975, he substituted this sequence with one in which the rhino accidentally discharges Tintin's rifle.

The earliest stories in The Adventures of Tintin have been criticised for animal cruelty; colonialism; violence; and ethnocentric, caricatured portrayals of non-Europeans. While the Hergé Foundation has presented such criticism as naïveté and scholars of Hergé such as Harry Thompson have said that "Hergé did what he was told by the Abbé Wallez", Hergé himself felt that his background made it impossible to avoid prejudice, stating: "I was fed the prejudices of the bourgeois society that surrounded me".

In 1999, the issue of Tintin's politics was the subject of a debate in the French parliament.

Tintin in the Congo has been criticised as presenting the Africans as naïve and primitive. In the original work, Tintin is shown at a blackboard addressing a class of African children: "My dear friends. I am going to talk to you today about your fatherland: Belgium". (Note: "Mes chers amis, je vais vous parler aujourd'hui de votre patrie: La Belgique.") Hergé redrew this in 1946 to show a lesson in mathematics. Hergé later admitted the flaws in the original story, excusing it saying: "I portrayed these Africans according to ... this purely paternalistic spirit of the time". Sue Buswell, who was the editor of Tintin at Methuen, summarised the perceived problems with the book in 1988 as "all to do with rubbery lips and heaps of dead animals", (Note: "Dead animals" refers to the fashion for big-game hunting at the time of the work's original publication.) although Thompson noted her quote may have been "taken out of context".

Drawing on André Maurois' Les Silences du colonel Bramble, Hergé presents Tintin as a big-game hunter, accidentally killing fifteen antelope as opposed to the one needed for the evening meal. However, concerns over the number of dead animals led Tintin's Scandinavian publishers to request changes. A page of Tintin killing a rhinoceros by drilling a hole in its back and inserting a stick of dynamite was deemed excessive; Hergé replaced the page with one in which the rhino accidentally discharges Tintin's rifle while he sleeps under a tree. In 2007, the UK's Commission for Racial Equality called for the book to be pulled from shelves after a complaint, stating: "It beggars belief that in this day and age Borders would think it acceptable to sell and display Tintin in the Congo." In August 2007, a Congolese student filed a complaint in Brussels that the book was an insult to the Congolese people. Public prosecutors investigated, and a criminal case was initiated, although the matter was transferred to a civil court. Belgium's Centre for Equal Opportunities warned against "over-reaction and hyper political correctness".

Hergé altered some of the early albums in subsequent editions, usually at the demand of publishers. For example, at the instigation of his American publishers, many of the African characters in Tintin in America were re-coloured to make their race Caucasian or ambiguous. The Shooting Star originally had an American villain with the Jewish surname of "Blumenstein". This proved controversial, as the character exhibited exaggerated, stereotypically Jewish characteristics. "Blumenstein" was changed to an American with a less ethnically specific name, Mr. Bohlwinkel, in later editions and subsequently to a South American of a fictional country São Rico. Hergé later discovered that 'Bohlwinkel' was also a Jewish name. In recent years, even Tintin's politics of peace have been investigated.

== Adaptations and memorabilia ==
The Adventures of Tintin has been adapted in a variety of media besides the original comic strip and its collections. Hergé encouraged adaptations and members of his studio working on the animated films. After Hergé's death in 1983, the Hergé Foundation and Moulinsart, the foundation's commercial and copyright wing, became responsible for authorising adaptations and exhibitions.

=== Television and radio ===
Two animated television adaptations and one radio adaptation have been made.

Hergé's Adventures of Tintin (Les aventures de Tintin d'après Hergé) (1957) was the first production of Belvision Studios. Ten of Hergé's books were adapted, each serialised into a set of five-minute episodes, with 103 episodes produced. (Note: Two series were created. Series 1: Two books, twelve episodes, were adapted in black and white as a test of the studio's abilities; these were actually faithful to the original albums. Series 2: Eight books, 91 episodes, were adapted in colour; these were often unfaithful to the original albums. The animation quality of the series was very limited.) The series was directed by Ray Goossens and written by Belgian comic artist Greg, later editor-in-chief of Tintin magazine, and produced by Raymond Leblanc. (Note: Belvision had just been launched by Raymond Leblanc, who had created Tintin magazine a decade earlier.) Most stories in the series varied widely from the original books, often changing whole plots.

The Adventures of Tintin (Les aventures de Tintin) (1991–92) was the more successful Tintin television series. An adaptation of twenty-one Tintin books, (Note: The series ran for three seasons, 13 episodes each season; the 21 stories usually presented in two-part segments.) it was directed by Stéphane Bernasconi and was produced by Ellipse (France) and Canadian Nelvana on behalf of the Hergé Foundation. The series adhered closely to the albums to such an extent that panels from the original were often transposed directly to the screen. The series aired in over fifty countries and was released on DVD. It aired in the US on HBO.

The Adventures of Tintin (1992–93) radio series was produced by BBC Radio 5. The dramas starred Richard Pearce as Tintin and Andrew Sachs as Snowy. Captain Haddock was played by Leo McKern in Series One and Lionel Jeffries in Series Two, Professor Calculus was played by Stephen Moore and Thomson and Thompson were played by Charles Kay.

The Adventures of Tintin were also released as radio dramas on LP and compact cassette recordings in French language versions in Belgium, France and Canada, German language versions in Germany, Swedish language versions in Sweden, Danish language versions in Denmark and Norwegian language versions in Norway.

=== Cinema ===
Five feature-length Tintin films were made before Hergé's death in 1983 and one more in 2011.

The Crab with the Golden Claws (Le crabe aux pinces d'or) (1947) was the first successful attempt to adapt one of the comics into a feature film. Written and directed by Claude Misonne and João B Michiels, the film was a stop-motion puppet production created by a small Belgian studio.

Tintin and the Golden Fleece (Tintin et le mystère de la Toison d'Or) (1961), the first live-action Tintin film, was adapted not from one of Hergé's Adventures of Tintin but instead from an original script written by André Barret and Rémo Forlani. Directed by Jean-Jacques Vierne and starring Jean-Pierre Talbot as Tintin and Georges Wilson as Haddock, the plot involves Tintin travelling to Istanbul to collect the Golden Fleece, a ship left to Haddock in the will of his friend, Themistocle Paparanic. Whilst in the city however, Tintin and Haddock discover that a group of villains also want possession of the ship, believing that it would lead them to a hidden treasure.

Tintin and the Blue Oranges (Tintin et les oranges bleues) (1964), the second live action Tintin film, was released due to the success of the first. Again based upon an original script, once more by André Barret, it was directed by Philippe Condroyer and starred Talbot as Tintin and Jean Bouise as Haddock. The plot reveals a new invention, the blue orange, that can grow in the desert and solve world famines, devised by Calculus' friend, the Spanish Professor Zalamea. An emir whose interests are threatened by the invention of the blue orange proceeds to kidnap both Zalamea and Calculus, and Tintin and Haddock travel to Spain in order to rescue them.

Tintin and the Temple of the Sun (Tintin et le temple du soleil) (1969), the first traditional animation Tintin film, was adapted from two of Hergé's Adventures of Tintin: The Seven Crystal Balls and Prisoners of the Sun. The first full-length, animated film from Raymond Leblanc's Belvision, which had recently completed its television series based upon the Tintin stories; it was directed by Eddie Lateste and featured a musical score by the critically acclaimed composer François Rauber. The adaptation is mostly faithful, although the Seven Crystal Balls portion of the story was heavily condensed.

Tintin and the Lake of Sharks (Tintin et le lac aux requins) (1972), the second traditional animation Tintin film and the last Tintin release for nearly 40 years, it was based on an original script by Greg and directed by Raymond Leblanc. Belvision's second feature takes Tintin to Syldavia to outwit his old foe Rastapopoulos. While the look of the film is richer, the story is less convincing. The movie was subsequently adapted into a comic album made up of stills from the film.

The Adventures of Tintin: The Secret of the Unicorn (2011) was Steven Spielberg's motion capture 3D film based on three Hergé albums: The Crab with the Golden Claws (1941), The Secret of the Unicorn (1943), and Red Rackham's Treasure (1944). Peter Jackson's company Weta Digital provided the animation and special effects. The movie received positive reviews and was a box office success.

=== Documentaries ===
I, Tintin (Moi, Tintin, 1976) was produced by Belvision Studios and Pierre Film.

Tintin and I (Tintin et moi, 2003), a documentary film directed by Anders Høgsbro Østergaard and co-produced by companies from Denmark, Belgium, France, and Switzerland, was based on a taped interview with Hergé by Numa Sadoul from 1971. Although the interview was published as a book, Hergé was allowed to edit the work prior to publishing and much of the interview was excised. Years after Hergé's death, the filmmaker returned to the original tapes and restored Hergé's often personal, insightful thoughts—and in the process brought viewers closer to the world of Tintin and Hergé. It was broadcast in the US on the PBS network on 11 July 2006.

Sur les traces de Tintin (On the trail of Tintin, 2010) was a five-part documentary television series which recaps several albums of the book series by combining comic panels (motionless or otherwise) with live-action imagery, with commentary provided.

=== Theatre ===
Tintin and the Black Island at the Arts Theatre in the West End of London, by the Unicorn Theatre Company, in 1980–81

Hergé himself helped to create two stage plays, collaborating with humourist Jacques Van Melkebeke. Tintin in the Indies: The Mystery of the Blue Diamond (1941) covers much of the second half of Cigars of the Pharaoh as Tintin attempts to rescue a stolen blue diamond. Mr. Boullock's Disappearance (1941–1942) has Tintin, Snowy, and Thomson and Thompson travel around the world and back to Brussels again to unmask an impostor trying to lay claim to a missing millionaire's fortune. The plays were performed at the Théâtre Royal des Galeries in Brussels. The scripts of the plays are lost.

In the late 1970s and early 1980s, two Tintin plays were produced at the Arts Theatre in the West End of London, adapted by Geoffrey Case for the Unicorn Theatre Company. These were Tintin's Great American Adventure, based on the comic Tintin in America (1976–1977) and Tintin and the Black Island, based on The Black Island (1980–81); this second play later toured. (Note: Geoffrey Case (adapted), Tony Wredden (directed): Tintin's Great American Adventure, Arts Theatre, London, 18 December 1976 to 20 February 1977, Unicorn Theatre Company. Tintin and the Black Island, Arts Theatre, London, 1980–81, Unicorn Theatre Company.)

A musical based on The Seven Crystal Balls and Prisoners of the Sun premièred on 15 September 2001 at the Stadsschouwburg (City Theatre) in Antwerp, Belgium. It was entitled Kuifje – De Zonnetempel (De Musical) ("Tintin – Temple of the Sun (The Musical)") and was broadcast on Canal Plus, before moving on to Charleroi in 2002 as Tintin – Le Temple du Soleil – Le Spectacle Musical.

The Young Vic theatre company in London ran Hergé's Adventures of Tintin, a musical version of Tintin in Tibet, at the Barbican Arts Centre (2005–2006); the production was directed by Rufus Norris and was adapted by Norris and David Greig. The show was successfully revived at the Playhouse Theatre in the West End of London before touring (2006–2007) to celebrate the centenary of Hergé's birth in 2007.

=== Video games ===
Tintin began appearing in video games when Infogrames, a French game company, released the side scroller Tintin on the Moon in 1989. The same company released a platform game titled Tintin in Tibet in 1995 for the Super NES and Mega Drive/Genesis. Another platform game from Infogrames titled Prisoners of the Sun was released the following year for the Super NES, Microsoft Windows, and Game Boy Color.

In 2001, Tintin became 3D in Tintin: Destination Adventure, released by Infogrames for Windows and PlayStation. Then in 2011, an action-adventure game called The Adventures of Tintin: The Secret of the Unicorn, a tie-in to the 2011 movie, was released by Ubisoft in October. In 2020, a match-3 mobile game called Tintin Match was released by 5th Planet games. An adventure game, titled Tintin Reporter – Cigars of the Pharaoh, was released by Microids in 2023.

=== Memorabilia and merchandise ===
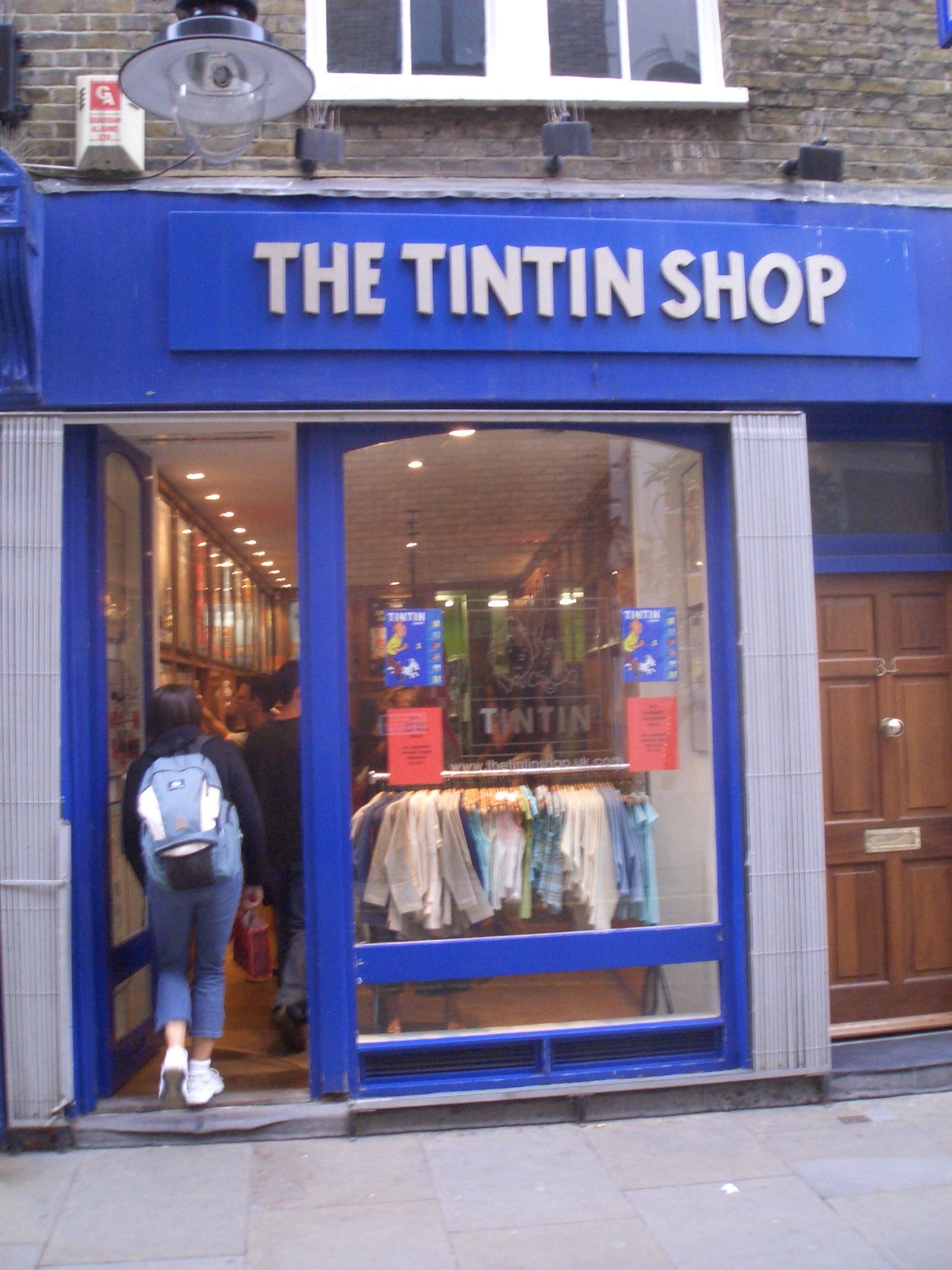
The Tintin Shop in Covent Garden, London

Images from the series have long been licensed for use on merchandise, the success of Tintin magazine helping to create a market for such items. Tintin's image has been used to sell a wide variety of products, from alarm clocks to underpants. Countless separate items related to the character have been available, with some becoming collector's items in their own right.

The Hergé Foundation has maintained control of the licenses, through Moulinsart (now Tintin Imaginatio), the commercial wing of the foundation. Speaking in 2002, Peter Horemans, the then director general at Moulinsart, noted this control: "We have to be very protective of the property. We don't take lightly any potential partners and we have to be very selective ... for him to continue to be as popular as he is, great care needs to be taken of his use". However, the Foundation has been criticised by scholars as "trivialising the work of Hergé by concentrating on the more lucrative merchandising" in the wake of a move in the late 1990s to charge them for using relevant images to illustrate their papers on the series.

Tintin memorabilia and merchandise has allowed a chain of stores based solely on the character to become viable. The first shop was launched in 1984 in Covent Garden, London. Tintin shops have also opened in both Bruges and Brussels in Belgium, and in Montpellier, France. In 2014, a Tintin shop opened in Taguig, the Philippines, only the second of its kind in Southeast Asia. The first Tintin shop in Southeast Asia opened in Singapore in 2010. The British bookstore chain, Ottakar's, founded in 1987, was named after the character of King Ottokar from the Tintin book King Ottokar's Sceptre, and their shops stocked a large amount of Tintin merchandise until their takeover by Waterstone's in 2006.

=== Stamps and coins ===
Belgian Post's series of postage stamps "Tintin on screen" issued 30 August 2011 featuring a chronological review of Tintin film adaptations made through the years.

Tintin's image has been used on postage stamps on numerous occasions. The first Tintin postage stamp was an eight-franc stamp issued by Belgian Post for the 50th anniversary of the publication of Tintin's first adventure on 29 September 1979, featuring Tintin and Snowy looking through a magnifying glass at several stamps. In 1999, a nine-stamp block celebrating ten years of the Belgian Comic Strip Center was issued, with the center stamp a photo of Tintin's famous Moon rocket that dominates the Comic Strip Center's entry hall. To mark the end of the Belgian Franc and to celebrate the seventieth anniversary of the publication of Tintin in the Congo, two more stamps were issued by Belgian Post on 31 December 2001: Tintin in a pith helmet and a souvenir sheet with a single stamp in the center. The stamps were jointly issued in the Democratic Republic of the Congo. In 2004, Belgian Post celebrated its own seventy-fifth anniversary, as well as the fiftieth anniversary of the publication of Explorers on the Moon, and the thirty-fifth anniversary of the Moon landings with a souvenir sheet of five stamps based upon the Explorers on the Moon adventure. To celebrate the centenary of Hergé's birth in 2007, Belgian Post issued a sheet of 25 stamps depicting the album covers of all 24 Adventures of Tintin (in 24 languages) plus Hergé's portrait in the center. A souvenir sheet of ten stamps called "Tintin on screen", issued 30 August 2011, depicts the Tintin film and television adaptations. (Note: "Tintin on screen" depicts both Tintin television programs and four of the five Tintin film adaptations (Lake of Sharks was omitted).)

Tintin has also been commemorated by coin several times. In 1995, the Monnaie de Paris (Paris Mint) issued a set of twelve gold medallions, available in a limited edition of 5000. A silver medallion was minted in 2004 to commemorate the 50th anniversary of the Tintin book Explorers on the Moon, again in a limited run, this time of 10,000. It quickly sold out. In 2004, Belgium minted a limited edition commemorative euro coin featuring Tintin and Snowy celebrating the 75th anniversary of Tintin's first adventure in January 2004. Although it has a face value of €10, it is, as with other commemorative euro coins, legal tender only in the country in which it was issued—in this case, Belgium. In 2006–2012 France issued the Comic Strip Heroes commemorative coin series featuring famous Franco-Belgian comics, beginning in 2006 with Tintin. It was a set of six different euro coins honouring Hergé: three 1½-euro silver coins featuring Tintin and the Professor, Tintin and Captain Haddock, and Tintin and Chang; a €10 (gold) featuring Tintin; and a €20 (silver) and a €50 (gold) featuring Tintin and Snowy. In 2007, on Hergé's centenary, Belgium issued its €20 (silver) Hergé/Tintin coin.

=== Parody and pastiche ===
A frame from Breaking Free, a revolutionary socialist comic that parodies the Adventures of Tintin

During Hergé's lifetime, parodies were produced of the Adventures of Tintin, with one of the earliest appearing in Belgian newspaper La Patrie after the liberation of the country from Nazi German occupation in September 1944. Entitled Tintin au pays de nazis ("Tintin in the Land of the Nazis"), the short and crudely drawn strip lampoons Hergé for working for a Nazi-run newspaper during the occupation.

Following Hergé's death, hundreds more unofficial parodies and pastiches of the Adventures of Tintin were produced, covering a wide variety of different genres. Tom McCarthy divided such works into three specific groupings: pornographic, political, and artistic. In a number of cases, the actual name "Tintin" is replaced by something similar, like Nitnit, Timtim, or Quinquin, within these books.

McCarthy's first group, pornographic parodies, includes 1976's Tintin en Suisse ("Tintin in Switzerland") and Jan Bucquoy's 1992 work La Vie Sexuelle de Tintin ("Tintin's Sex Life"), featuring Tintin and the other characters engaged in sexual acts. Another such example was Tintin in Thailand, in which Tintin, Haddock, and Calculus travel to the East Asian country for a sex holiday. The book began circulating in December 1999, but in 2001, Belgian police arrested those responsible and confiscated 650 copies for copyright violation.

Other parodies have been produced for political reasons: for instance, Tintin in Iraq lampoons the world politics of the early 21st century, with Hergé's character General Alcazar representing President of the United States George W. Bush. Written by the pseudonymous Jack Daniels, Breaking Free (1989) is a revolutionary socialist comic set in Britain during the 1980s, with Tintin and his uncle (modelled after Captain Haddock) being working class Englishmen who turn to socialism in order to oppose the capitalist policies of the Conservative Party government of Margaret Thatcher. When first published in Britain, it caused an outrage in the mainstream press, with one paper issuing the headline that "Commie nutters turn Tintin into picket yob!"

Other comic creators have chosen to create artistic stories that are more like fan fiction than parody. The Swiss artist Exem created the irreverent comic adventures of Zinzin, what The Guardian calls "the most beautifully produced of the pastiches." Similarly, Canadian cartoonist Yves Rodier has produced a number of Tintin works, none of which have been authorised by the Hergé Foundation, including a 1986 "completion" of the unfinished Tintin and Alph-art, which he drew in Hergé's ligne claire style.

The response to these parodies has been mixed in the Tintinological community. Many despise them, seeing them as an affront to Hergé's work. Nick Rodwell of the Hergé Foundation took this view, declaring that "none of these copyists count as true fans of Hergé. If they were, they would respect his wishes that no one but him draw Tintin's adventures". Where possible, the foundation has taken legal action against those known to be producing such items. Others have taken a different attitude, considering such parodies and pastiches to be tributes to Hergé, and collecting them has become a "niche specialty".

As of 1 January 2025, Tintin and other characters appearing in the 1929 comic strips have entered the public domain in the United States, but not in Hergé's native Belgium, which will be in 2054. The French artist Fabrice Sapolsky has announced his plans for a 1929 Tintin reboot.

However, for Alain Berenboom, lawyer for the Hergé Foundation, according to the Berne Convention, Tintin will enter the public domain in 2034.

=== Exhibitions ===
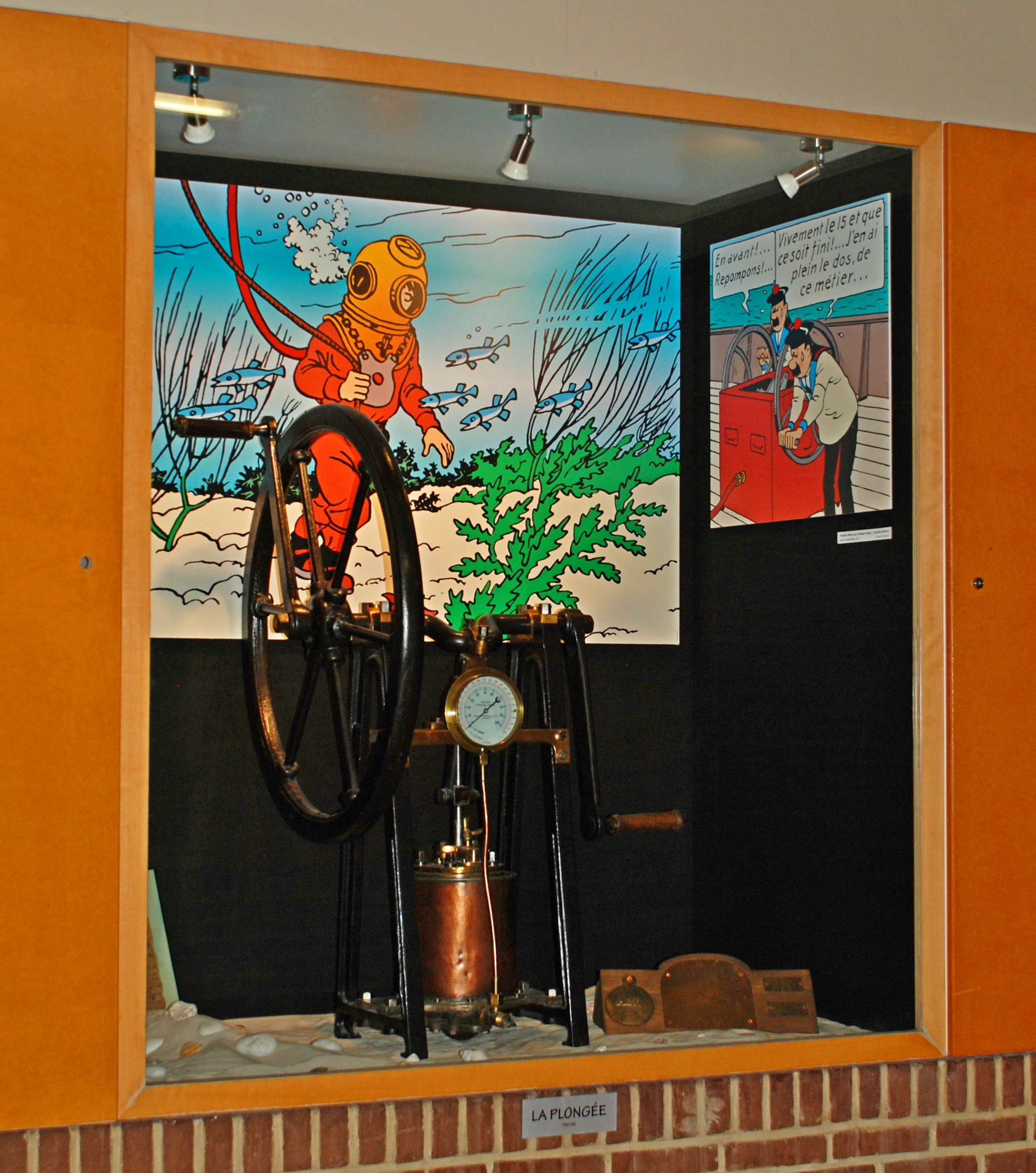
Scenes from the album Red Rackham's Treasure are being used to illustrate the concept of underwater diving in this exhibition, located in the corridors of the Blocry Sports Centre in Louvain-la-Neuve.

Hergé art exhibition at the Centre Georges Pompidou modern art museum in Paris, commemorating the centenary of Hergé's birth in 2007.

After Hergé's death in 1983, his art began to be honoured at exhibitions around the world, keeping Tintin awareness at a high level. The first major Tintin exhibition in London was Tintin: 60 years of Adventure, held in 1989 at the Town Hall in Chelsea. This early exhibition displayed many of Hergé's original sketches and inks, as well as some original gouaches. In 2001, an exhibition entitled Mille Sabords! ("Billions of Blistering Barnacles!") was shown at the Musée national de la Marine in Paris. In 2002, the Bunkamura Museum of Art in Tokyo staged an exhibition of original Hergé drawings as well as of the submarine and rocket ship invented in the strips by Professor Calculus. The National Maritime Museum in Greenwich, London, hosted the exhibition The Adventures of Tintin at Sea in 2004, focusing on Tintin's sea exploits, and in commemoration of the 75th anniversary of the publication of Tintin's first adventure. 2004 also saw an exhibition in the Halles Saint-Géry/Sint-Gorikshallen in Brussels titled Tintin et la ville ("Tintin and the City") showcasing all cities in the world Tintin had travelled.

The Belgian Comic Strip Center in the Brussels business district added exhibits dedicated to Hergé in 2004. The Brussels' Comic Book Route in the center of Brussels added its first Tintin mural in July 2005.

The centenary of Hergé's birth in 2007 was commemorated at the largest museum for modern art in Europe, the Centre Georges Pompidou in Paris, with Hergé, an art exhibition honouring his work. The exhibition, which ran from 20 December 2006 until 19 February 2007, featured some 300 of Hergé's boards and original drawings, including all 124 original plates of The Blue Lotus. Laurent le Bon, organiser of the exhibit said: "It was important for the Centre to show the work of Hergé next to that of Matisse or Picasso". Michael Farr claimed: "Hergé has long been seen as a father figure in the comics world. If he's now recognised as a modern artist, that's very important".

2009 saw the opening of the Hergé Museum (Musée Hergé), designed in contemporary style, in the town of Louvain-la-Neuve, south of Brussels. Visitors follow a sequence of eight permanent exhibit rooms covering the entire range of Hergé's work, showcasing the world of Tintin and his other creations. In addition, the new museum has already seen many temporary exhibits, including Into Tibet With Tintin.

== Legacy ==
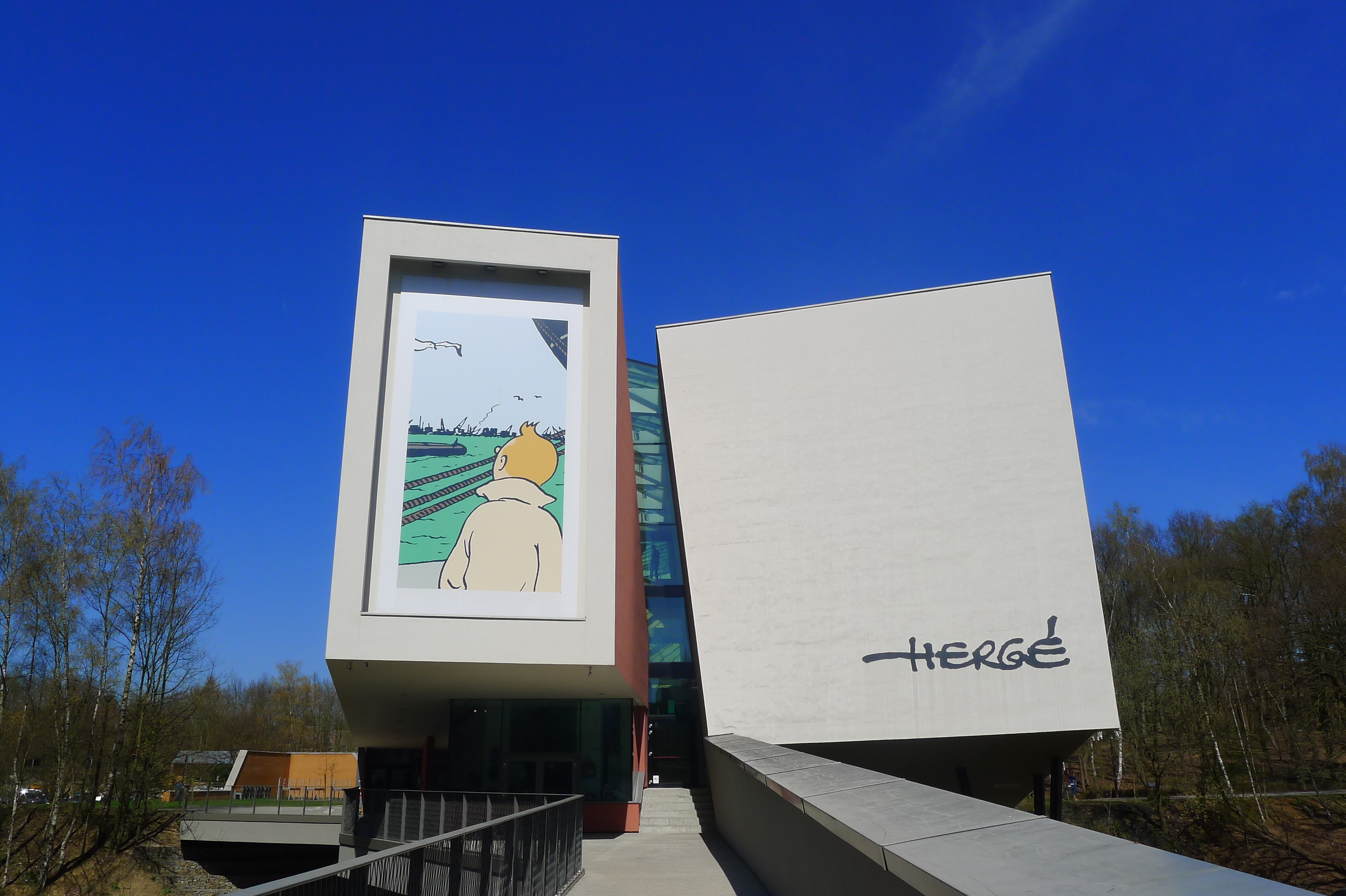
The Musée Hergé, located in the town of Louvain-la-Neuve, south of Brussels, opened in June 2009, honouring the work of Hergé.

Hergé is recognised as one of the leading cartoonists of the twentieth century. Most notably, Hergé's ligne claire style has been influential to creators of other Franco-Belgian comics. Contributors to Tintin magazine have employed ligne claire, and later artists Jacques Tardi, Yves Chaland, Jason Little, Phil Elliott, Martin Handford, Geof Darrow, Eric Heuvel, Garen Ewing, Joost Swarte, and others have produced works using it.

In the wider art world, both Andy Warhol and Roy Lichtenstein have claimed Hergé as one of their most important influences. Lichtenstein made paintings based on fragments from Tintin comics, whilst Warhol used ligne claire and even made a series of paintings with Hergé as the subject. Warhol, who admired Tintin's "great political and satirical dimensions", said, "Hergé has influenced my work in the same way as Walt Disney. For me, Hergé was more than a comic strip artist".

Hergé has been lauded as "creating in art a powerful graphic record of the 20th century's tortured history" through his work on Tintin, whilst Maurice Horn's World Encyclopedia of Comics declares him to have "spear-headed the post-World War II renaissance of European comic art". French philosopher Michel Serres noted that the twenty-three completed Tintin albums constituted a "chef-d'oeuvre" ("masterpiece") to which "the work of no French novelist is comparable in importance or greatness".

In 1966, Charles de Gaulle said: "Basically, you know, my only international rival is Tintin! We are the little ones who don't let themselves be fooled by the big ones". (Note: "Au fond, vous savez, mon seul rival international c'est Tintin! Nous sommes les petits qui ne se laissent pas avoir par les grands." Spoken by Charles de Gaulle, according to his Minister for Cultural Affairs André Malraux. De Gaulle had just banned all NATO aircraft bases from France; "the great ones" referred to USA and USSR. De Gaulle then added, "On ne s'en apperçoit pas, à cause de ma taille." ("Only nobody notices the likeness because of my size".))

In March 2015, Brussels Airlines painted an Airbus A320-200 with registration OO-SNB in a special Tintin livery.

In 2015, a 6 m (20 ft) tall sculpture of the rocket featured in Tintin: Destination Moon was unveiled at Brussels Airport.

Tintin has become a symbol of Belgium and so was used in a variety of visual responses to the 2016 Brussels bombings.

In 2024, the Royal Belgian Football Association unveiled a Tintin-inspired kit for the Belgian national football team. The light blue and brown kit was used for the team's away fixtures in the UEFA Euro 2024.

== List of titles ==
The following are the twenty-four canonical Tintin comic albums, with their English titles. Publication dates are for the original French-language versions.

Tintin comic albums
Album Number	Title	Serialisation	Album (B&W)	Album (colour)	Notes
1	Tintin in the Land of the Soviets	1929–1930	1930	2017	Hergé prevented this book's republication until 1973. It became available in a coloured edition in 2017.
2	Tintin in the Congo	1930–1931	1931	1946	Hergé re-published in colour and in a fixed 62-page format.
3	Tintin in America	1931–1932	1932	1945	Hergé re-published in colour and in a fixed 62-page format.
4	Cigars of the Pharaoh	1932–1934	1934	1955	Hergé re-published in colour and in a fixed 62-page format.
5	The Blue Lotus	1934–1935	1936	1946	Hergé re-published in colour and in a fixed 62-page format.
6	The Broken Ear	1935–1937	1937	1943	Hergé re-published in colour and in a fixed 62-page format.
7	The Black Island	1937–1938	1938	1943, 1966	Hergé re-published in colour and in a fixed 62-page format.
8	King Ottokar's Sceptre	1938–1939	1939	1947	Hergé re-published in colour and in a fixed 62-page format.
9	The Crab with the Golden Claws	1940–1941	1941	1943	Hergé re-published in colour and in a fixed 62-page format.
10	The Shooting Star	1941–1942		1942	Book 10 was the first to be originally published in colour.
11	The Secret of the Unicorn	1942–1943		1943	Books 11 to 15 set a middle period for Hergé marked by war and changing collaborators.
12	Red Rackham's Treasure	1943		1944	Books 11 to 15 set a middle period for Hergé marked by war and changing collaborators.
13	The Seven Crystal Balls	1943–1946		1948	Books 11 to 15 set a middle period for Hergé marked by war and changing collaborators.
14	Prisoners of the Sun	1946–1948		1949	Books 11 to 15 set a middle period for Hergé marked by war and changing collaborators.
15	Land of Black Gold	1939-1940 (Note: The original serialization appeared in the Belgian newspaper Le Vingtième Siècle between 25 September 1939 and 8 May 1940, when it was interrupted due to the shutdown of the newspaper by the German occupation.); 1948–1950		1950, 1971	Books 11 to 15 set a middle period for Hergé marked by war and changing collaborators.
16	Destination Moon	1950–1952		1953	Books 16 to 23 (and revised editions of books 4, 7 & 15) are creations of Studios Hergé.
17	Explorers on the Moon	1952–1953		1954	Books 16 to 23 (and revised editions of books 4, 7 & 15) are creations of Studios Hergé.
18	The Calculus Affair	1954–1956		1956	Books 16 to 23 (and revised editions of books 4, 7 & 15) are creations of Studios Hergé.
19	The Red Sea Sharks	1956–1958		1958	Books 16 to 23 (and revised editions of books 4, 7 & 15) are creations of Studios Hergé.
20	Tintin in Tibet	1958–1959		1960	Books 16 to 23 (and revised editions of books 4, 7 & 15) are creations of Studios Hergé.
21	The Castafiore Emerald	1961–1962		1963	Books 16 to 23 (and revised editions of books 4, 7 & 15) are creations of Studios Hergé.
22	Flight 714 to Sydney	1966–1967		1968	Books 16 to 23 (and revised editions of books 4, 7 & 15) are creations of Studios Hergé.
23	Tintin and the Picaros	1975–1976		1976	Books 16 to 23 (and revised editions of books 4, 7 & 15) are creations of Studios Hergé.
24	Tintin and Alph-Art	1986		2004	Hergé's unfinished book, published posthumously.

The following are double albums with a continuing story arc:

- Cigars of the Pharaoh (no. 4) & The Blue Lotus (no. 5)
- The Secret of the Unicorn (no. 11) & Red Rackham's Treasure (no. 12)
- The Seven Crystal Balls (no. 13) & Prisoners of the Sun (no. 14)
- Destination Moon (no. 16) & Explorers on the Moon (no. 17)

Hergé attempted and then abandoned Le Thermozéro (1958). Outside the Tintin series, a 48-page comic album supervised (but not written) by Hergé, Tintin and the Lake of Sharks, was released in 1972; it was based on the film Tintin et le lac aux requins.

== See also ==
- The Adventures of Jo, Zette and Jocko, another series by Hergé
- List of Tintin media
- List of boats in The Adventures of Tintin
- The Adventures of Tintin publication history
- Quick and Flupke, another series by Hergé
