= Tintin in Thailand =

1999 Belgian parody comic album

Tintin in Thailand (Tintin en Thailande)
- Cover of Tintin in Thailand
- Date: 1999
- Publisher: Farang

Creative team
- Writers: Bud E. Weyser

Original publication
- Language: French

Tintin in Thailand (French: Tintin en Thaïlande) is a parody of The Adventures of Tintin books by Hergé, released in 1999. It is written and designed to emulate a volume of the Tintin books, but is the author's own story. It was written in French by a Belgian author, Baudouin de Duve, who used the alias Bud E. Weyser, a name that is a play on the name of American beer Budweiser.

== Design ==
Tintin in Thailand emulates the style and format of the original Tintin books, with some key differences. With the exception of the cover, the entire volume is in black and white. The characters are imitations of the originals, and are presented as acting uncharacteristically, such as by using profane language. "Bud E. Weyser" is listed as the author, and there is a one-page foreword in French.

Copies were printed in Thailand to be distributed in Belgium, where Tintin in Thailand is thought to have been in circulation from December 1999. Thousands of copies in both French and English were also distributed in Thailand. The quality of the Thai forgeries was found to be superior to that of the Belgian version.

== Plot ==
The plot opens on a rainy and cold night in Marlinspike Hall. The occupants, Tintin and Captain Haddock are unhappy and financially broke, since there are no new Tintin adventures for them because of the death of their creator, Hergé (this is the first of many self-references the plot makes). As they discuss their plight, Jolyon Wagg's wife arrives and ask them to go to Thailand to search for her husband, who went there on a trip he won from his employer, the Rock Bottom Insurance Company, and never returned. She had already sent Thomson and Thompson to look, but without any results. Since it is an all expenses paid trip, Tintin and Haddock immediately accept and are soon on their way to Thailand. Nestor, Snowy and the cat are left behind, but Professor Calculus joins them.

As they check into their Bangkok hotel, they are spotted by Derek Dimwit, a representative of the Marlinsprick Company which holds the rights to the Tintin franchise. He calls his head office and is told he must stop them from going on any more adventures that could be used in a book not controlled by Marlinsprick.

Tintin and his friends go to the red light district, where they run into General Alcazar, now the owner of a Thailand bar after being deposed by General Tapioca. Alcazar tells them he saw Jolyon Wagg in his bar, but he has gone north to Chiang Mai with a kathoey (transsexual). Calculus and Haddock both pick up prostitutes in the bar, but Tintin prefers the company of a young boy instead (this is a reference to questions by fans regarding Tintin's sexuality in the original books).

The next day the adventurers fly north and soon run into Thomson and Thompson. The Thompson twins do not want anyone to find Wagg, since they are enjoying themselves in Thailand at Mrs. Wagg's expense. However, they pick up the trail and Wagg, who is living outside Chiang Mai. They learn he no longer enjoys the company of his kathoey partner. Wagg longs for his wife's cooking, in particular her rabbit marinated in beer. After a series of misadventures, they all find themselves back in Chiang Mai in time to celebrate the new year of 2000. The story ends with Tintin being presented the first copy of Tintin in Thailand. He declares the proceeds will guarantee him many peaceful days in the sun.

== Arrests ==
In February 2001, the Hergé Foundation learned about Bud E. Weyser's attempts to market Tintin in Thailand as an unknown Tintin book to distributors in Belgium. The Belgian police organized a sting, with an officer pretending to be a prospective buyer; two arrests were made in Tournai. They also arrested the designer in Antwerp. The men confessed to printing more than 1,000 copies for sale in Belgium, and the 650 copies found were seized. All three men were subsequently released.

As of 2007 copies of Tintin in Thailand can still occasionally be found in Bangkok. However, the Hergé Foundation takes quick action to remove copies that are posted online.
