= Mr. Boullock's Disappearance =

Play by Hergé and Jacques Van Melkebeke

- Original language: French
- Written by: Hergé and Jacques Van Melkebeke
- Subject: Tintin attempts to search for mysterious Mr. Boullock
- Genre: Adventure
- Setting: India and Syldavia

Premiere
- Date: 1941
- Place: Théâtre Royal des Galeries, Belgium
- Directed by: Paul Riga

Mr. Boullock's Disappearance (French: Monsieur Boullock a disparu) is a 1941 Belgian theatre piece in three acts written by Hergé and Jacques Van Melkebeke. It features Hergé's famous character, Tintin. The events of the story occur without the chronology of Tintin stories.

== History ==
Van Melkebeke wrote the first and third act, with Hergé writing the second act. The writing took only ten days. This was the second time that the two had collaborated on a stage version of Tintin, after Tintin aux Indes, which had been staged April-May 1941. Like the earlier play, Mr. Boullock's Disappearance was produced at the Théâtre Royal des Galeries in Brussels, and was directed by Paul Riga. Performances took place during the Christmas school holidays, on 26, 29 and 30 December 1941, and 3 and 8 January 1942. Critical reception was lukewarm.

== Cast ==
- Marcel André played the two detectives commonly known in English as Thomson and Thompson. Here they are introduced by name for the first time as "Durant and Durand"; they were later renamed as "Dupont and Dupond".
- Tintin: Roland Ravez

== Synopsis ==
Tintin and the Thompsons are called in by Mrs Boullock to find her husband, a millionaire who disappeared two days previously. Before they can even start their enquiries, a man arrives at the house claiming to be suffering from amnesia. Mrs Boullock identifies him as her husband, but he is shortly followed by an identical man also claiming to be suffering from amnesia, throwing her into doubt. To identify which is the real Mr Boullock, and which the impostor seeking to claim his fortune, Tintin and the Thompsons seek the help of Professor Doryford, inventor of a truth-detector. Prosper and Jules, the henchmen of the impostor, try to impede their journey, and ultimately to eliminate both Tintin and Doryford.

The adventure takes Tintin to Casablanca, the virgin forests of Argentina, and to China and Tibet (this being Tintin's first visit to Tibet). The denouement comes about back in Brussels, in the Boullock home, where with the aid of Professor Doryford and his truth-detector the impostor is unmasked and the real Mr Boullock is restored to his wife.

== Characters ==
Characters created especially for the play include Mohamed El Bazoul, the two villains, Prosper and Jules, an Indian, Aztapopotitirolidacatapelt, Chou-Chi-Fou and Chong, and two Tibetan bonzes.
