= King Ottokar's Sceptre =

Comic album by Belgian cartoonist Hergé

King Ottokar's Sceptre (Le Sceptre d'Ottokar)
- Cover of the English edition
- Date: 1939 (black and white); 1947 (colour)
- Series: The Adventures of Tintin
- Publisher: Casterman

Creative team
- Creator: Hergé

Original publication
- Published in: Le Petit Vingtième
- Date of publication: 4 August 1938 – 10 August 1939
- Language: French

Translation
- Publisher: Methuen
- Date: 1958
- Translator: Leslie Lonsdale-Cooper; Michael Turner

Chronology
- Preceded by: The Black Island (1938)
- Followed by: Land of Black Gold (1939) (abandoned); The Crab with the Golden Claws; (1941)

King Ottokar's Sceptre (French: Le Sceptre d'Ottokar) is the eighth volume of The Adventures of Tintin, the comics series by Belgian cartoonist Hergé. Commissioned by the conservative Belgian newspaper Le Vingtième Siècle for its children's supplement Le Petit Vingtième, it was serialised weekly from August 1938 to August 1939. Hergé intended the story as a satirical criticism of the expansionist policies of Nazi Germany, in particular the annexation of Austria in March 1938 (the Anschluss). The story tells of young Belgian reporter Tintin and his dog Snowy, who travel to the fictional Balkan nation of Syldavia, where they combat a plot to overthrow the monarchy of King Muskar XII.

King Ottokar's Sceptre was a commercial success and was published in book form by Casterman shortly after its conclusion. Hergé continued The Adventures of Tintin with Land of Black Gold until Le Vingtième Siècle's forced closure in 1940, while the series itself became a defining part of the Franco-Belgian comics tradition. In 1947, Hergé coloured and redrew King Ottokar's Sceptre in his distinctive ligne-claire style with the aid of Edgar P. Jacobs for Casterman's republication. The story introduces the recurring character Bianca Castafiore, and introduced the fictional countries of Syldavia and Borduria, both of which reappear in later stories. The first volume of the series to be translated into English, King Ottokar's Sceptre was adapted for both the 1956 Belvision Studios animation Hergé's Adventures of Tintin and for the 1991 Ellipse/Nelvana animated series The Adventures of Tintin.

== Synopsis ==
Having discovered a lost briefcase in a Belgian park, Tintin returns it to its owner, the sigillographer Professor Hector Alembick, who informs the reporter of his plans to travel to the Balkan nation of Syldavia. Tintin discovers agents spying on the professor and follows those responsible to a nearby Syldavian restaurant. An unknown man agrees to meet with Tintin but is found unconscious and appears to have amnesia. Shortly after, the reporter receives a threatening note and is then the target of a bomb attack; Tintin survives the latter when police detectives Thomson and Thompson intercept the bomb. Suspecting that these events are linked to Syldavia, Tintin decides to accompany Professor Alembick on his forthcoming visit to the country. On the plane journey there, Tintin notices Alembick acting out of character, and suspects that an imposter has replaced him. Reading a brochure on Syldavian history, Tintin theorises that the imposter is part of a plot to steal the sceptre of the medieval King Ottokar IV from the current King Muskar XII before St. Vladimir's Day, thus forcing him to abdicate.

Forcibly ejected from the plane by the pilot, Tintin survives and informs local police of his fears regarding the plot. However, the police captain is part of the conspiracy, and he organises an ambush in the woods where Tintin will be eliminated. Tintin evades death, and heads to the capital city of Klow in a car carrying the opera singer Bianca Castafiore. Leaving the car to evade Castafiore's singing, Tintin is arrested and survives another assassination attempt before heading to Klow on foot. Arriving in the city, he meets the King's aide-de-camp, Colonel Boris Jorgen, seeking permission to meet the King. However, Jorgen is also a conspirator and organises a further unsuccessful assassination attempt aimed at Tintin. While Bianca Castafiore is singing at a gala opera, Tintin gatecrashes and he is escorted away by a group of security guards. En route to transferring Tintin to prison, the custody van has an accident trying to avoid a careless pedestrian and Tintin suffers a concussion. Meanwhile, the imposter pretending to be Alembick is allowed into Kropow Castle, where the sceptre is kept. Tintin finally succeeds in personally warning the King about the plot and they both rush to Kropow Castle, only to find that the sceptre is missing.

With the aid of Thomson and Thompson, who have recently arrived in Syldavia, Tintin discovers how the conspirators smuggled out the sceptre from the Castle and pursues the thieves, first by car and then on foot across the mountains. He is able to prevent the sceptre being carried over the border into neighbouring Borduria, discovering a letter on one of the conspirators. It reveals that the plot has been orchestrated by Müsstler, a political agitator who runs both the Syldavian Iron Guard and the Zyldav Zentral Revolutzionär Komitzät (ZZRK), a subversive organization which intends to have Borduria invade and annex Syldavia. Entering Borduria, Tintin commandeers a fighter plane and heads to Klow, but the Syldavian military shoot him down. Parachuting, he continues to Klow by foot, returning the sceptre to the King on St. Vladimir's Day and securing the monarchy. In return, the king makes Tintin a Knight of the Order of the Golden Pelican, making him the first foreigner to receive the honour. Tintin later learns that the imposter was Alembick's twin brother after police arrest Müsstler and rescue the real Alembick. Afterwards, Tintin and the Thompsons take a flying boat home.

== History ==
=== Background ===
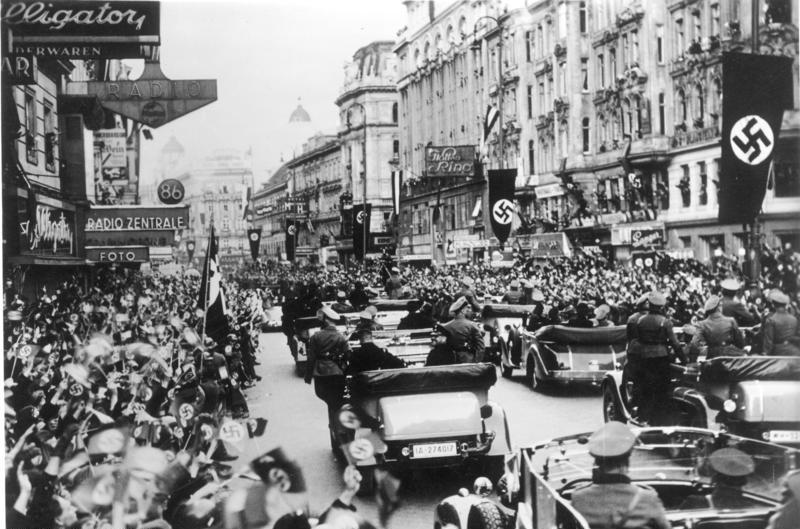
The Anschluss: cheering crowds greet the Nazis in Vienna

King Ottokar's Sceptre was not the first Tintin adventure to draw specifically on contemporary events; Hergé had for instance previously made use of the 1931 Japanese invasion of Manchuria as a political backdrop for the setting in The Blue Lotus. This time, Hergé had closely observed the unfolding events surrounding the expansionist policies of Nazi Germany. In producing this story, he was particularly influenced by the Anschluss, the annexation of Austria by Nazi Germany in March 1938. The Munich Agreement and the subsequent Nazi invasion of the Sudetenland followed in October 1938. Three weeks after King Ottokar's Sceptre finished serialisation, Germany invaded Poland. By this point, the threat to Belgian sovereignty posed by Nazi expansionism was becoming increasingly clear. By 1939, the events surrounding the Italian annexation of Albania made Hergé insist his editor publish the work to take advantage of current events as he felt "Syldavia is Albania". Later, Hergé denied that he had just one country in mind.

Hergé claimed that the basic idea behind the story had been given to him by a friend; biographer Benoît Peeters suggested that the most likely candidate was school and scouting friend Philippe Gérard, who had warned of a second war with Germany for years. Tintin scholars have claimed Hergé did not develop the names Syldavia and Borduria himself; (Note: At first, Hergé named the country "Sylduria".) instead, the country names had supposedly appeared in a paper included in a 1937 edition of the British Journal of Psychology, in which the author described a hypothetical conflict between a small kingdom and an annexing power. Reportedly, the paper, by Lewis Fry Richardson and entitled "General Foreign Policy", explored the nature of inter-state conflict in a mathematical way. Peeters attributed these claims to Georges Laurenceau, but said that "no researcher has confirmed this source". Instead, a paper by Richardson entitled "Generalized Foreign Politics: A Story in Group Psychology" was published in The British Journal of Psychology Monograph Supplements in 1939, but did not mention Syldavia or Borduria. In any case, given the publication date, it is unlikely that it was an influence on King Ottokar's Sceptre.

"At the time, Germany was of course on my mind; Ottokar's Sceptre is nothing other than the tale of a failed Anschluss. But one can take it to be any other totalitarian regime ... Moreover, isn't the villain of Ottokar's Sceptre called Müsstler, evidently a combination of Mussolini and Hitler? It strikes me as a clear allusion".

— Hergé, talking to Numa Sadoul

Hergé designed Borduria as a satirical depiction of Nazi Germany. Hergé named the pro-Bordurian agitator "Müsstler" from the surnames of Nazi leader Adolf Hitler and Italy's National Fascist leader Benito Mussolini. The name also had similarities with the British Union of Fascists' leader Oswald Mosley and the National Socialist Movement in the Netherlands' leader Anton Mussert. Müsstler's group was named after the Iron Guard, a Romanian fascist group that sought to oust King Carol II and forge a Romanian-German alliance. The Bordurian officers wore uniforms based on those of the German SS, while the Bordurian planes are German in design; in the original version Tintin escapes in a Heinkel He 112, while in the revised version this is replaced by a Messerschmitt Bf 109. Hergé adopted the basis of Borduria's false flag operation to take over Syldavia from the plans outlined in Curzio Malaparte's Coup d'État: The Technique of Revolution.

Syldavia's depiction was influenced by the costumes and cultures of Romania and the neighboring Balkan region. The mosques that appear in Hergé's Syldavia are based on those found throughout the Balkans, while the appearance of the Syldavian village, featuring red-tiled roofs and minarets, may have been specifically inspired by the Bosnian town of Mostar. Syldavia's mineral rich subsoil could be taken as a reference to the uranium deposits found under Romania's Carpathian Mountains – later to be mentioned directly in the eventual Destination Moon. Tintin scholars have noted that the black pelican of Syldavia's flag resembles the black eagle of Albania's flag, and that Romania is the only European country to which pelicans are native.

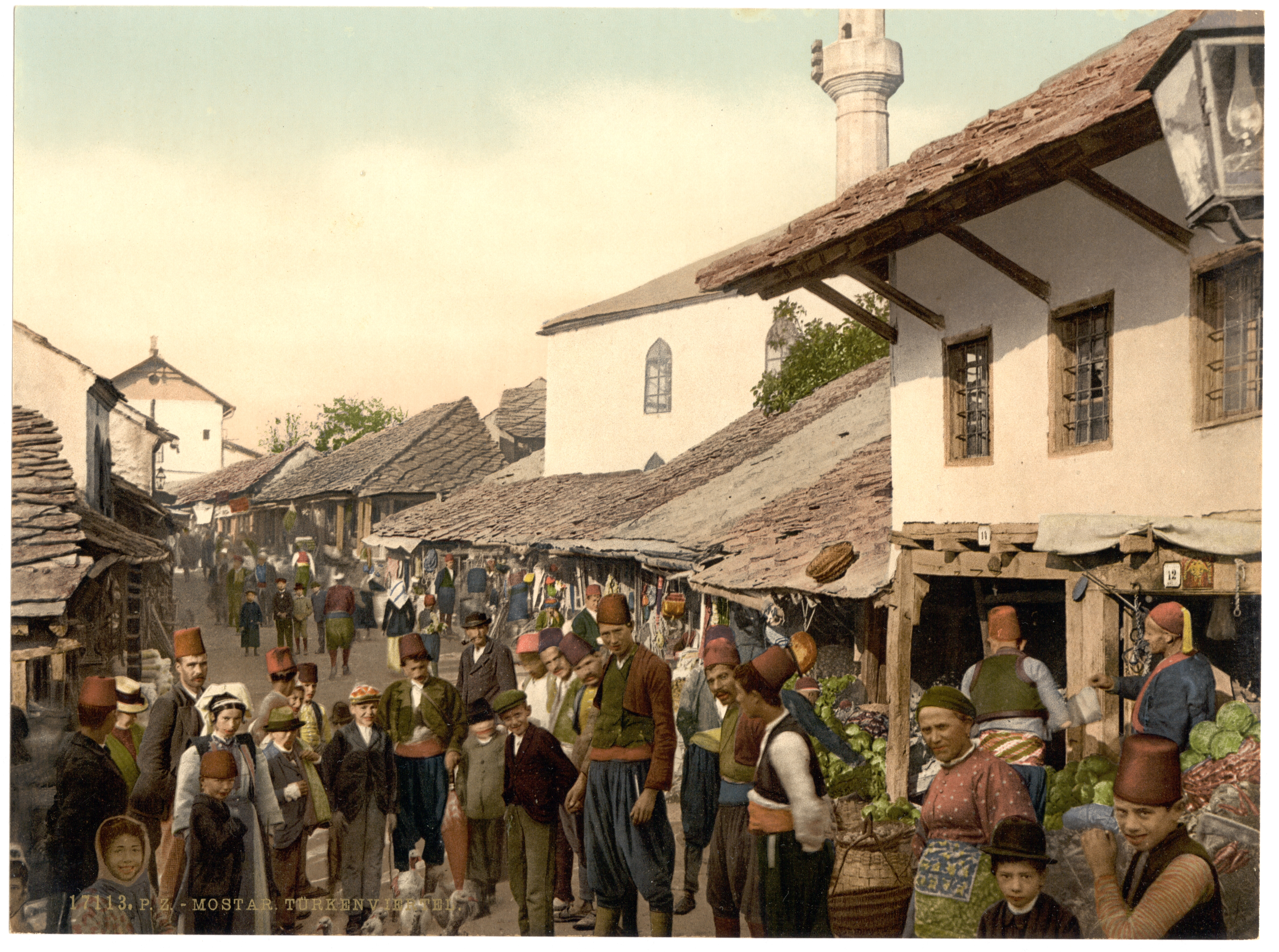
The Bosnian town of Mostar (pictured c.1890-1900) has been suggested as a likely influence on Hergé's depiction of the Syldavian village.

The name Syldavia may be a composite of Transylvania and Moldavia, two regions with historical ties to Romania. Czech, Slovak, and Bohemian history influenced the Syldavian names, while several medieval Bohemian kings were the inspiration for the name "Ottokar". The Polish language influenced Hergé's inclusion of –ow endings to the names of Syldavian places, while Polish history parallels Hergé's description of Syldavian history. The Syldavian language used in the book had French syntax but with Marollien vocabulary, a joke understood by the original Brussels-based readership.

However, despite its Eastern European location, Syldavia itself was partly a metaphor for Belgium – Syldavian King Muskar XII physically resembles King Leopold III of Belgium. (Note: Syldavian King Muskar XII also resembles King Zog I of Albania and Prince Alexandru Ioan Cuza of Romania.) Hergé's decision to create a fictional Eastern European kingdom might have been influenced by Ruritania, the fictional country created by Anthony Hope for his novel The Prisoner of Zenda (1894), which subsequently appeared in film adaptations in 1913, 1915, 1922, and 1937. Many places within Syldavia are visually based on pre-existing European sites: the Diplodocus in the Klow Natural History Museum is based on the one in the Museum für Naturkunde, Berlin; the Syldavian Royal Palace is based on both the Charlottenburg Palace, Berlin and the Royal Palace of Brussels; and Kropow Castle is based on Olavinlinna Castle, constructed in fifteenth century Savonia – a historical province of the Swedish Kingdom, located in modern-day Finland. For the revised version, Kropow Castle was drawn with an additional tower, inspired by Vyborg Castle, Russia. The United Kingdom also bore at least one influence on Syldavia, as King Muskar XII's carriage is based on the British royal family's Gold State Coach.

=== Original publication ===
King Ottokar's Sceptre was first serialised in Le Petit Vingtième from 4 August 1938 to 10 August 1939 under the title Tintin En Syldavie ("Tintin in Syldavia"). It would prove to be the last Tintin adventure to be published in its entirety in Le Petit Vingtième. From 14 May 1939, the story was also serialised in the French Catholic newspaper, Cœurs Vaillants. In 1939, Éditions Casterman collected the story together in a single hardcover volume; Hergé insisted to his contact at Casterman, Charles Lesne, that they hurry up the process due to the changing political situation in Europe. The Nazi–Soviet Molotov–Ribbentrop Pact was signed the day Hergé delivered the book's remaining drawings; finishing touches included the book's original front cover, the royal coat of arms for the title page, and the tapestry depicting the Syldavian's 1127 victory over the Turks in "The Battle of Zileheroum" on page 20. Hergé suggested that for this publication, the story's title be changed to The Scepter of Ottokar IV; Casterman changed this to King Ottokar's Sceptre.

King Ottokar's Sceptre introduced the recurring character of Bianca Castafiore to the series, who appears alongside her pianist Igor Wagner. It also witnessed the introduction of antagonist Colonel Jorgen, who reappears in the later Tintin adventures Destination Moon and its sequel Explorers on the Moon. The Alembick brothers' inclusion echoes the Balthazar brothers' inclusion in The Broken Ear.

After the conclusion of King Ottokar's Sceptre, Hergé continued The Adventures of Tintin with Land of Black Gold until Germany placed Belgium under occupation in 1940 and forced the closure of Le Vingtième Siècle. The adventure Land of Black Gold had to be abandoned. (Note: Land of Black Gold would be successfully re-attempted ten years later, in 1950.)

=== Second version, 1947 ===
The story was redrawn and colourised in 1947. For this edition, Hergé was assisted by Edgar P. Jacobs. Jacobs oversaw changes to the costumes and background of the story; in the 1938 version, the Syldavian Royal Guards are dressed like British Beefeaters, while the 1947 version has them dressed in a Balkanised uniform similar to the National Guards Unit of Bulgaria. Jacobs also inserted a cameo of himself and his wife in the Syldavian royal court, while in that same scene is a cameo of Hergé, his then-wife Germaine, his brother Paul, and three of his friends – Édouard Cnaepelinckx, Jacques Van Melkebeke, and Marcel Stobbaerts. Hergé and Jacobs also inserted further cameos of themselves at the bottom of page 38, where they appear as uniformed officers. While the character of Professor Alembick had been given the forename of Nestor in the original version, this was changed to Hector for the second; this had been done so as to avoid confusion with the character of Nestor, the butler of Marlinspike Hall, whom Hergé had introduced in The Secret of the Unicorn. Editions Casterman published this second version in book form in 1947.

=== Subsequent publications and legacy ===
King Ottokar's Sceptre became the first Tintin adventure to be published for a British audience when Eagle serialised the comic in 1951. Here, the names of Tintin and Milou were retained, although the characters of Dupond and Dupont were renamed Thomson and Thompson; the latter two names would be adopted by translators Leslie Lonsdale-Cooper and Michael Turner when they translated the series into English for Methuen Publishing in 1958.

Casterman republished the original black-and-white version of the story in 1980, as part of the fourth volume in their Archives Hergé collection. In 1988, they then published a facsimile version of that first edition.

== Critical analysis ==
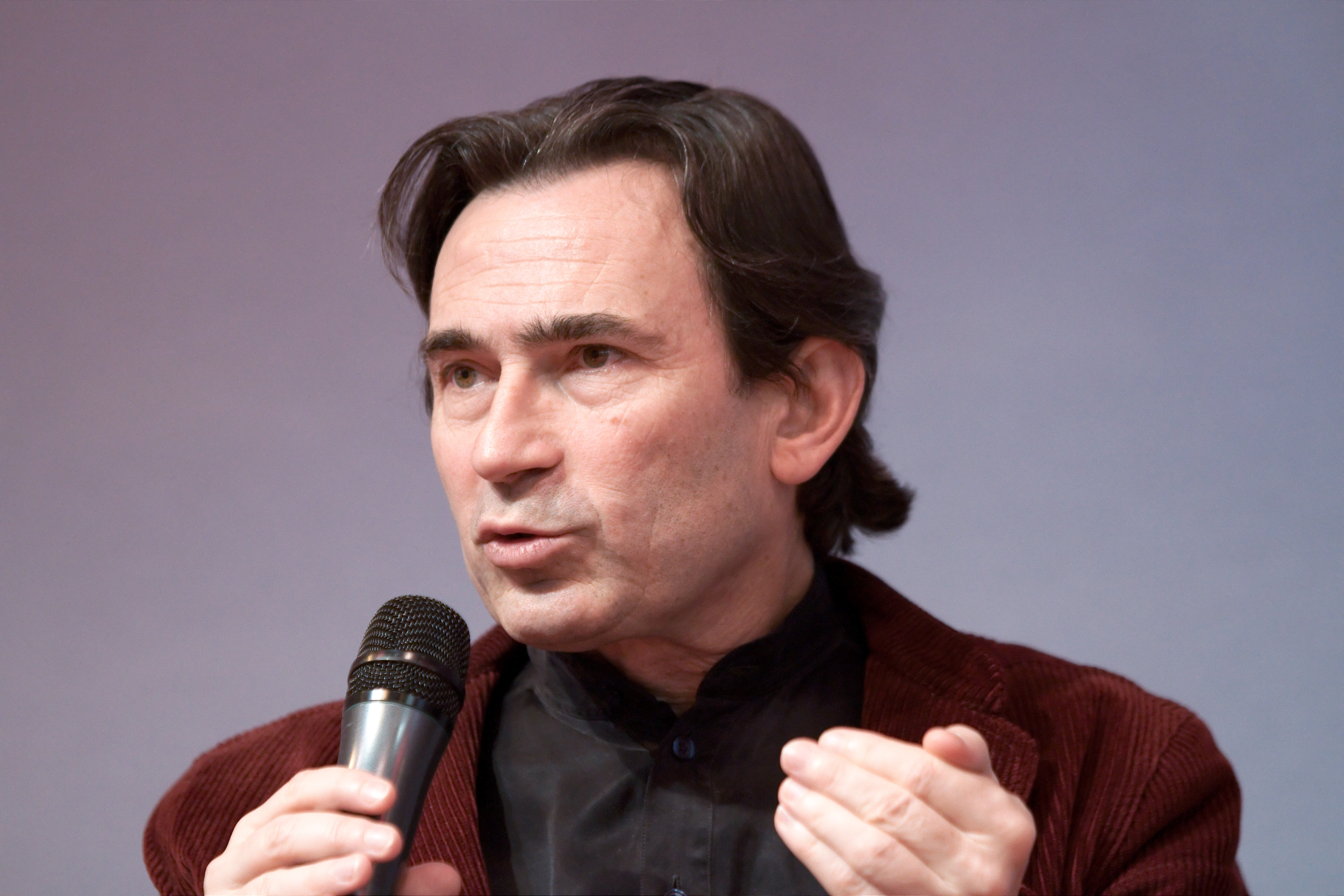
Hergé biographer Benoît Peeters (pictured, 2010) felt that King Ottokar's Sceptre showed "a political maturity".

Harry Thompson described King Ottokar's Sceptre as a "biting political satire" and asserted that it was "courageous" of Hergé to have written it given that the threat of Nazi invasion was imminent. Describing it as a "classic locked room mystery", he praised its "tightly constructed plot". Ultimately, he deemed it one of the best three Tintin adventures written before World War II, alongside The Blue Lotus and The Black Island. He also thought it noteworthy that in 1976, archaeologists discovered a sceptre belonging to a 13th-century King Ottokar in St. Vitus Cathedral, Prague. Hergé biographer Pierre Assouline believed that the story had the atmosphere of Franz Lehár's The Merry Widow, with "added touches" from the films of Erich von Stroheim and Ernst Lubitsch. Fellow biographer Benoît Peeters thought that it exhibited "a political maturity" and "originality". Further, he felt that Hergé was able to break free from the "narrative limits [of] ... too much realism" by the use of Syldavia as a setting.

Jean-Marc Lofficier and Randy Lofficier called King Ottokar's Sceptre "a Hitchcockian thriller" which "recaptures the paranoid ambience" of Cigars of the Pharaoh. They compared the pace of the latter part of the story to that of Steven Spielberg's Indiana Jones films before noting that despite the "horrors of the real world" that are present with Borduria's inclusion, they do not interfere in "the pure escapist nature of the adventure". Ultimately they awarded it three stars out of five.

Michael Farr opined that the adventure has "a convincingly authentic feel" due to the satirical portrayal to Nazi Germany, but that this was coupled with "sufficient scope for invention" with the creation of Syldavia. He compared it to Hitchcock's The Lady Vanishes. Farr preferred the colour version assembled with E.P. Jacobs' aid, however. Deeming it "particularly successful", he thought that it was "one of the most polished and accomplished" adventures in the series, with a "perfectly paced and balanced" narrative that mixed drama and comedy successfully.

Literary critic Jean-Marie Apostolidès of Stanford University asserted that the inclusion of the Iron Guard evoked Colonel François de La Rocque's Croix-de-Feu. Noting that the figure of Müsstler was "the Evil One without a face", he expressed disbelief regarding Hergé's depiction of Syldavia, as there were no apparent economic problems or reasons why Müsstler's anti-monarchist conspiracy was so strong; thus, "mass revolution remains schematic".

Literary critic Tom McCarthy identified several instances in the story that he argued linked to wider themes within the Adventures of Tintin. He identified a recurring host-and-guest theme in Alembick's visit to Syldavia, and believed that the theme of thieving was present in the story as Alembick's identity is stolen. Another theme identified within the series by McCarthy was that of the blurring between the sacred and the political; he saw echoes of this in King Ottokar's Sceptre as the King has to wait three days before appearing to the Syldavian public on St. Vladimir's Day, something that McCarthy thought linked to Jesus Christ and the Resurrection. McCarthy also opined that a number of characters in the book visually resembled Captain Haddock, a character who would be introduced in the subsequent Tintin adventure, The Crab with the Golden Claws.

== Adaptations ==
King Ottokar's Sceptre was the first of The Adventures of Tintin to be adapted for the animated series Hergé's Adventures of Tintin. The series was created by Belgium's Belvision Studios in 1957, directed by Ray Goossens and written by Greg. The studio divided King Ottokar's Sceptre into six 5-minute black-and-white episodes that diverged from Hergé's original plot in many ways. It was also adapted into a 1991 episode of The Adventures of Tintin television series by French studio Ellipse and Canadian animation company Nelvana. The episode was directed by Stéphane Bernasconi, and Thierry Wermuth voiced the character of Tintin.

Tintin fans adopted the Syldavian language that appears in the story and used it to construct grammars and dictionaries, akin to the fan following of Star Trek's Klingon and J. R. R. Tolkien's Elvish.
