= Jacques Laudy =

- Born: 7 April 1907 Schaerbeek, Belgium
- Died: 28 July 1993 (aged 86)
- Areas: Cartoonist, Artist
- Notable works: Hassan et Kadour

Jacques Laudy (7 April 1907 – 28 July 1993) was a Belgian comics artist who contributed to the early issues of the weekly Tintin magazine.

Jacques Laudy was born in Schaerbeek in 1907 as the son of the painter Jean Laudy. He worked mainly as a painter, illustrator, and comics artist. Laudy started his career as an artist for Bravo magazine that, like Spirou magazine, was one of the leading Belgian comics publications before and during World War II. One of the other artists there was Edgar Pierre Jacobs, who had first met Laudy in the 1920s and who would become a lifelong friend. Laudy was the physical example for Blake, one of the main characters of Jacobs' Blake and Mortimer.

Hergé asked Laudy as one of the first artists, together with Jacobs, Paul Cuvelier, and Jacques van Melkebeke, to fill the new Tintin magazine. Laudy created The Legend of the Four Aymon Brothers. His only real series was Hassan et Kadour, while the rest of his oeuvre consisted mainly of one-offs, stories that didn't belong in a series. This lack of a series and lack of album publication also meant that Laudy never became as well known as the others. In 1992, he was the focus of a retrospective exhibition at the Belgian Centre for Comic Strip Art.

His main interest outside art was music. From 1928 on, he was a collector and maker of pipes, mainly Scottish ones. An instrument made by him in 1940 is in the collection of the Musical Instrument Museum of Brussels.

== Bibliography ==
Many works by Laudy have never been published as albums and are only available in the magazines they originally appeared in. This is a list of those comics or illustrations that were published as a book eventually.

- Les mameluks de Bonaparte, editions R.T.P., 1975, published in Dutch as Soldaten van Napoleon by Brabantia Nostra the same year
- De dief van Bagdad, Panda, 1978
- De vrolijcke en heerlijcke daden van Keizer Karel en andere vertelsels, Jonas, 1979
- Silhouetten, Blues, 1981
- Le Royaume d'Edgar J., Himalaya / Magic Strip, 1993, published in Dutch as Het rijk van Edgar J.by Loempia the same year

== Awards ==
- 1974: Grand Prix Saint-Michel
