= Cigars of the Pharaoh =

Comic album by Belgian cartoonist Hergé

Cigars of the Pharaoh (Les Cigares du Pharaon)
- Cover of the English edition
- Date: 1934 (black and white); 1955 (colour)
- Series: The Adventures of Tintin
- Publisher: Casterman

Creative team
- Creator: Hergé

Original publication
- Published in: Le Petit Vingtième
- Date of publication: 8 December 1932 – 8 February 1934
- Language: French

Translation
- Publisher: Methuen
- Date: 1971
- Translator: Leslie Lonsdale-Cooper; Michael Turner

Chronology
- Preceded by: Tintin in America (1932)
- Followed by: The Blue Lotus (1936)

Cigars of the Pharaoh (French: Les Cigares du Pharaon) is the fourth volume of The Adventures of Tintin, the series of comic albums by Belgian cartoonist Hergé. Commissioned by the conservative Belgian newspaper Le Vingtième Siècle for its children's supplement Le Petit Vingtième, it was serialised weekly from December 1932 to February 1934. The story tells of young Belgian reporter Tintin and his dog Snowy, who are travelling in Egypt when they discover a pharaoh's tomb with dead Egyptologists and boxes of cigars. Pursuing the mystery of the cigars, Tintin and Snowy travel across Southern Arabia and India, and reveal the secrets of an international drug smuggling enterprise.

Following on from Tintin in America, Cigars was a commercial success, and was published in book form by Casterman shortly after its conclusion. Hergé continued The Adventures of Tintin with The Blue Lotus, the plot of which followed on from Cigars. The series itself became a defining part of the Franco-Belgian comic tradition. In 1955, it was re-drawn and coloured by Hergé and his assistants at Studios Hergé to match his distinctive ligne-claire style. Critical analysis of the story has focused on its innovation, and the Adventure introduces the recurring characters of detectives Thomson and Thompson and villain Rastapopoulos. The comic was loosely adapted by Hergé and Jacques Van Melkebeke for the 1941 play Tintin in India: The Mystery of the Blue Diamond; a more faithful adaptation was later made for the 1991 Ellipse/Nelvana animated series The Adventures of Tintin.

== Synopsis ==
Holidaying on a Mediterranean cruise ship, Tintin and his dog Snowy meet wealthy film producer Rastapopoulos and eccentric Egyptologist Sophocles Sarcophagus. When two policemen (Thomson and Thompson) accuse Tintin of opium smuggling, he escapes the ship and joins Sarcophagus on his search for the undiscovered tomb of the Pharaoh Kih-Oskh, near Cairo. Tintin discovers that the tomb is full of mummified bodies (previous Egyptologists who tried to find the tomb), and boxes of cigars labelled with the mysterious symbol of Kih-Oskh. Sarcophagus disappears inside the tomb and Tintin and Snowy fall unconscious after an unseen enemy gasses them. They are then taken aboard a ship inside wooden sarcophagi, captained by smuggler Allan, but to avoid the coastguard Allan orders the sarcophagi thrown overboard.

Tintin and Snowy are rescued by a gunrunner who transports them to Arabia. Travelling by land, Tintin meets Sheikh Patrash Pasha, a big fan of his, and encounters Rastapopoulos filming a movie. Escaping Thomson and Thompson again, who believe Tintin is part of the gunrunners, Tintin and Snowy travel through the desert, eventually reaching a city. The local army drafts Tintin and then arrests him as a spy, after he finds more cigars labelled with the symbol of Kih-Oskh. Thomson and Thompson rescue him from execution in order to arrest him. However, when the army storms their hideout, Tintin manages to elude the authorities and escapes Arabia boarding a plane.

Tintin runs out of fuel over India, crashing into the jungle. After saving a sick elephant, Tintin discovers Sarcophagus, who has become insane and thinks he is Pharaoh Ramesses II. While seeking for help at a nearby village, Sarcophagus gets hypnotized by a fakir who commands him to kill Tintin. Tintin then interrogates the poet Zloty, who is visiting the village. Zloty reveals that there is an international drug smuggling ring determined to kill Tintin, but is injected with Rajaijah juice ("the poison of madness") by the fakir and becomes insane. Meeting the Maharaja of Gaipajama, the two become friends, with the Maharaja revealing that his family has long been fighting a criminal opium-smuggling gang, and in the process his father and brother went mad.

The fakir appears and Tintin follows him, discovering the drug cartel's hideout. While holding a conference, all the members are dressed in purple robes strongly reminiscent of the Ku Klux Klan's. After successfully capturing all the members of the gang (except the fakir), the Thompsons arrive and explain to Tintin that the Cairo police managed to discover the hideout of the drug smugglers in Egypt. They also confirm that they have learned Tintin is innocent. The fakir escapes, and kidnaps the Maharaja's son with the aid of the leader of the conspiracy, whose face is not shown. Tintin pursues them in a sports car, rescuing the boy and capturing the fakir, while the leader falls into a chasm, seemingly dying. Tintin returns to Gaipajama, where his return is celebrated. Unwrapping one of the cigars with the mysterious Kih-Oskh symbol, Tintin explains to the Maharaja how opium was smuggled across the world in these cigars.

== History ==
=== Background ===
The Taijitu symbol and the Kih-Oskh symbol.

Georges Remi – best known under the pen name Hergé – was employed as editor and illustrator of Le Petit Vingtième ("The Little Twentieth"), a children's supplement to Le Vingtième Siècle ("The Twentieth Century"), a staunchly Roman Catholic, conservative Belgian newspaper based in Hergé's native Brussels which was run by the Abbé Norbert Wallez. In 1929, Hergé began The Adventures of Tintin comic for Le Petit Vingtième, revolving around the exploits of fictional Belgian reporter Tintin. Wallez ordered Hergé to set his first adventure in the Soviet Union to act as anti-socialist propaganda for children (Tintin in the Land of the Soviets), to set his second adventure in the Belgian Congo to encourage colonial sentiment (Tintin in the Congo), and to set his third adventure in the United States to use the story as a denunciation of American capitalism (Tintin in America).

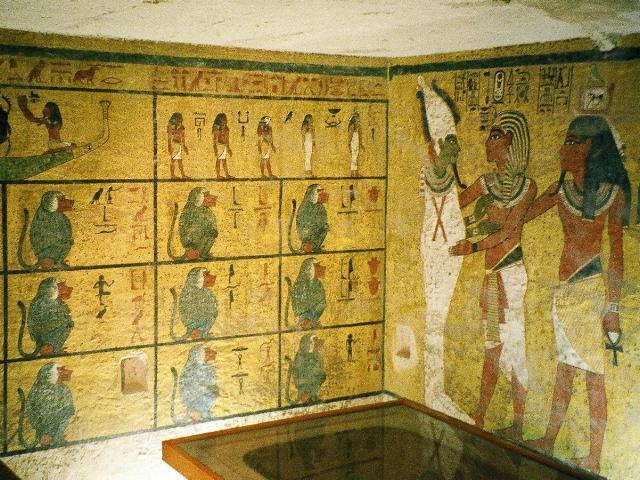
Howard Carter's 1922 discovery of Tutankhamun's tomb (pictured) influenced Cigars.

For his fourth Adventure, Hergé was eager to write a mystery story. The 1930s saw mystery novels flourish across Western Europe with the success of authors like Agatha Christie and Ellery Queen. The decision to create a scenario around the tomb of Kih-Oskh was influenced by the 1922 discovery of Pharaoh Tutankhamun's tomb by Howard Carter and the surrounding tabloid claims regarding a Curse of the Pharaohs. Hergé returned to this theme for The Seven Crystal Balls (1948). The name Kih-Oskh was an allusion to the kiosks where Le Petit Vingtième was sold. The Kih-Oskh symbol was described by Hergé as a distortion of the Taoist symbol of the Taijitu, with biographer Benoît Peeters thinking that it foreshadowed the "Yellow Mark" that featured in the Blake and Mortimer comic The Yellow "M" (1952–54) authored by Hergé's later collaborator Edgar P. Jacobs. Hergé was aided in the production of Cigars of the Pharaoh by his assistant Paul "Jam" Jamin, who was heavily influenced by British magazines The Humorist and Punch.

Hergé took influence from the published works of French adventurer and gunrunner Henry de Monfreid, particularly his books Secrets of the Red Sea and The Hashish Cruise. Having lived through the First World War, Hergé disliked arms dealers, and used Monfreid as the basis for the gunrunner character in Cigars. The idea of mummified bodies being lined up along a wall was adopted from Pierre Benoît's 1919 book L'Atlantide (Atlantis), which had recently been made into a 1932 film by Georg Wilhelm Pabst. The wall paintings depicted on a cover of Le Petit Vingtième was based on a bas-relief of Hathor and Seti I housed in the Louvre, Paris, while the throne featured in Tintin's dream was adopted from that found in the tomb of Tutankhamun. The inclusion of the secret society operating the smuggling ring was influenced by right-wing conspiracy theories about Freemasonry, with Hergé likely gaining information on the brotherhood from a 1932 article by Lucien Farnoux-Reynaud in the radical magazine Le Crapouillot (The Mortar Shell).

=== Original publication, 1932–34 ===
Cigars on the front of Le Petit Vingtième; the frieze is based on an example in the Louvre.

On 24 November 1932, Le Petit Vingtième published a fictional interview between Jamin and Tintin in which the reporter announced that he would be travelling to China via Egypt, India, Ceylon, and Indochina. Later on 8 December, the story began serialisation in the supplement under the title of The Adventures of Tintin, Reporter, in the Orient. As the story began in Egypt rather than China, Hergé briefly renamed the story to The Cairo Affair. The story was not following any plan or pre-written plot, with Hergé as usual devising the story on a week-by-week basis. In Autumn 1934, the adventure was published in a book. Cigars was the first of the Adventures published by Casterman, with whom Hergé had signed a contract in late 1933, although much to his annoyance, they delayed publication until the autumn of 1934, after the culmination of the summer holidays. In 1936, they successfully requested that he produce several colour plates to be inserted into the reprint of the book.

Cigars saw the introduction of several characters who would gain a recurring role in The Adventures of Tintin. The most notable are the two detectives, who were initially called "Agent X33 and Agent X33 bis". In his 1941 Tintin play co-written with Jacques Van Melkebeke, Tintin in India: The Mystery of the Blue Diamond, Hergé named them "Durant and Durand", although he later renamed them "Dupont and Dupond". The series' English-language translators, Michael Turner and Leslie Lonsdale-Cooper, renamed them "Thomson and Thompson." They were based on a combination of the stereotypical Belgian policeman of the 1930s with Hergé's observations of his father and uncle, Alexis and Léon Remi, who were identical twins.

The series introduced Tintin's adversary Roberto Rastapopoulos in Cigars, here depicted as a famous Hollywood film director. It is only in the successor volume, The Blue Lotus, that he is also revealed as the head of an international criminal organisation. His name was developed by one of Hergé's friends; Hergé thought it was hilarious and decided to use it. He devised Rastapopoulos as an Italian with a Greek surname, but the character fitted anti-Semitic stereotypes of Jews; Hergé was adamant that the character was not Jewish. A fourth recurring character introduced in this story was the Portuguese merchant Oliveira da Figueira, who would reappear in both the subsequent Adventures set in the Middle East, Land of Black Gold (1950) and The Red Sea Sharks (1958). One of the core characters of the story was Sophocles Sarcophagus, an Egyptologist who is the stereotype of an eccentric professor. In this respect, he is a prototype for the character of Cuthbert Calculus, whom Hergé would introduce later in Red Rackham's Treasure (1943).

It was during the serialisation of Cigars that Wallez was embroiled in a scandal after he was accused of defaming the Bureau of Public Works. The accusation resulted in a legal case being brought against the newspaper, and in response its owners demanded Wallez's resignation, which was tended in August 1933. Without Wallez, Hergé became despondent, and in March 1934 he tried to resign, but was encouraged to stay after his workload was reduced and his monthly salary was increased from 2000 to 3000 francs. Jamin subsequently took over Hergé's responsibility for the day-to-day running of Le Petit Vingtième.

=== Second version, 1955 ===
Comparisons of the same scene from the 1934 and 1955 versions of the comic.

In the 1940s and 1950s, when Hergé's popularity had increased, he and his team at Studios Hergé redrew many of the original black-and-white Tintin adventures in colour using the ligne claire ("clear line") (Note: Hergé himself did not use the term ligne claire to describe his drawing style. Cartoonist Joost Swarte first used the term in 1977.) drawing style he had developed so that they visually fitted in with the new Tintin stories being created. The Studios reformatted and coloured Cigars in 1955; it was the last of the early works to undergo this process.

In cutting down the length of the story, Hergé removed various isolated scenes that added nothing to the development of the plot, such as those in which Tintin confronts a bat, a crocodile, and snakes. The Arabian city that Tintin and Snowy searched for in the story was no longer identified as Mecca, while the Maharajah's three advisers were removed. New elements were also inserted; Hergé added a depiction of ancient Egyptian pyramids into the background. Hergé also added the character of Allan, who had originally been introduced in the later, 1941 adventure The Crab with the Golden Claws, and also appeared as Rastapopoulos' henchman in later albums. Hergé inserted an allusion to his friend and collaborator Edgar P. Jacobs into the story by including a mummified professor named E.P. Jacobini in the Egyptian tomb.

Whereas the original version had included Sheikh Patrash Pasha showing Tintin a copy of Tintin in America, in the 1955 version this was changed to the earlier Tintin in the Congo, and Hergé would change it again in 1964 for subsequent printings, this time to Destination Moon (1953), an Adventure set chronologically after Cigars. Benoît Peeters exclaimed that with this scene, the reader can imagine Tintin's surprise at encountering an adventure he had not yet had and which included the characters of Captain Haddock and Cuthbert Calculus whom he had not yet met. Another anachronism in this version appears only in the English version, when Snowy refers to Marlinspike Hall, the ancestral home of Captain Haddock, from the much later volumes of the series. Harry Thompson opined that the most important changes to the book were artistic, for in the late 1950s Hergé was at the peak of his artistic ability.

=== Later publications ===
Casterman republished the original black-and-white version in 1979 in a French-language collected volume with The Blue Lotus and The Broken Ear, the second part of the Archives Hergé collection. In 1983, they then published a facsimile version of the original.

== Critical analysis ==
Jean-Marc Lofficier and Randy Lofficier considered Cigars of the Pharaoh to be graphically between Tintin in America and The Blue Lotus, as Hergé was expanding his "visual vocabulary" and making use of "unforgettable moments" such as the dream sequence in the tomb. Although recognising that Hergé was still devising his plot on a week-by-week basis, they thought that the work was an improvement on his earlier stories because of the inclusion of "mystery and fantasy". Awarding it three stars out of five, they thought the book was a "surreal thriller, drenched and atmospheric". Believing that the work not only dealt with madness, but also was madness, they thought the book evoked "a sense of dreamlike suspension of disbelief". They also highlighted the inclusion of the Kih-Oskh symbol throughout the book, describing it as being akin to a recurring musical theme, stating that it added "a note of pure oneirism".

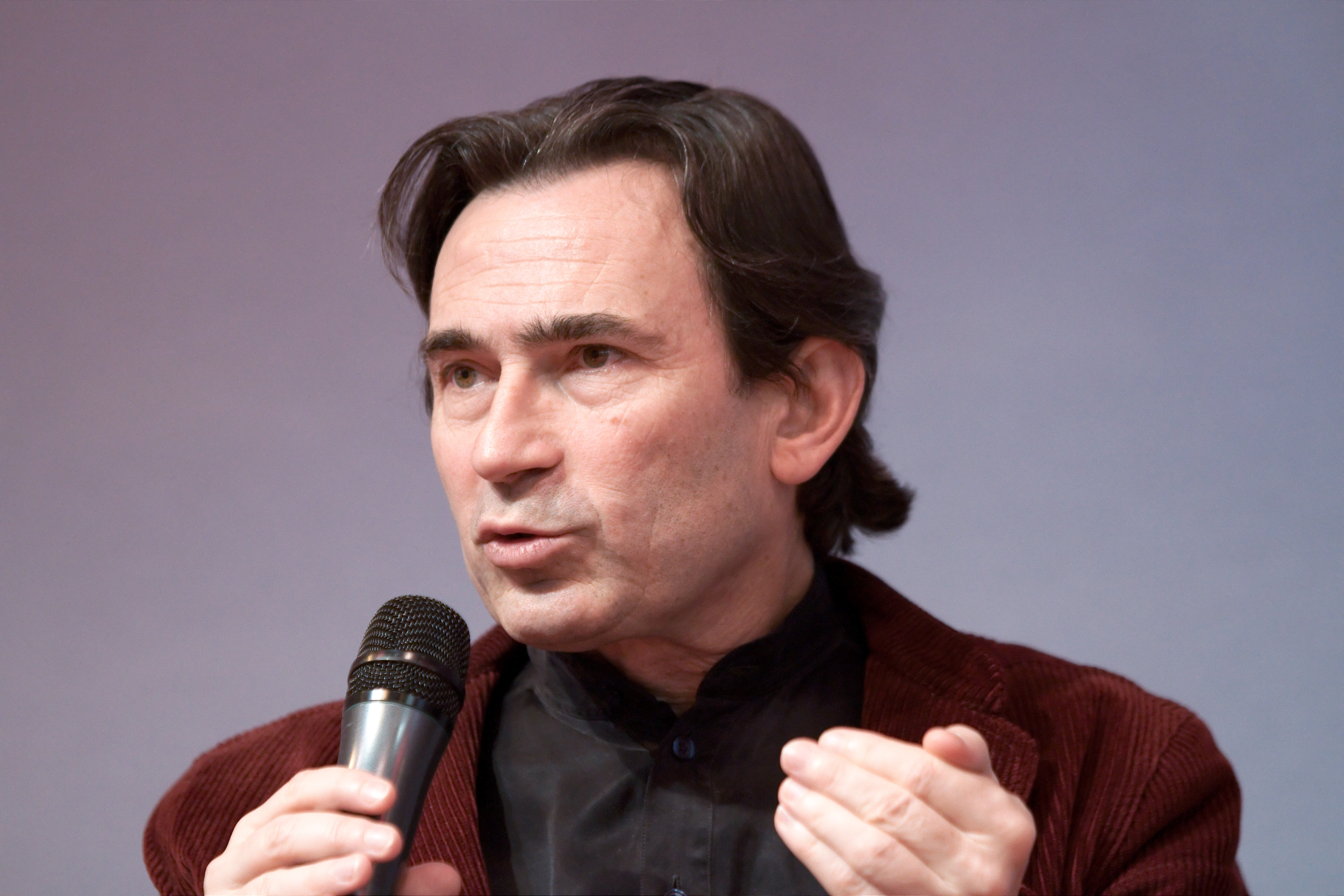
Hergé biographer Benoît Peeters considered Cigars to be the first of The Adventures of Tintin to exhibit "narrative unity".

Harry Thompson considered Cigars "almost completely unrecognisable from its predecessors", praising its "inspired comic characters" and "observed character comedy", which he thought escaped the sheer slapstick evident in the earlier Adventures. He also praised the elements of mystery and suspense that Hergé introduced, opining that it created "a genuine sense of fear without recourse to a deus ex machina". More critically, he thought that the plot's "glaring flaw" was the immediate transposition of events from Egypt to India, also believing that the inclusion of British colonialists as the antagonists made "partial amends" for the colonialist attitude displayed by Tintin in Tintin in the Congo. Michael Farr thought that Tintin was "a maturer hero" in Cigars, being more of a detective than a reporter. He thought that the dream sequence was "one of the most imaginative and disturbing scenes" in the series, illustrating Hergé's "growing virtuosity with the medium". He also praised the scenes set in the Indian colonial bungalow, commenting that it was "claustrophobic and sinisterly dramatic" and worthy of the work of Agatha Christie, opining that the car chase provided "a highly cinematic ending". Overall, he thought it to be a narrative "rich in mystery and drama" which was as much of a landmark in the series as The Blue Lotus.

Hergé biographer Benoît Peeters thought that with Cigars, Hergé was engaging in the "novelesque", and that the opening scene had echoes of Rodolphe Töpffer's Mr Pencil. He also thought it the first of the Adventures to have a "semblance" of "narrative unity". Fellow biographer Pierre Assouline thought that the story was difficult for the reader to follow, because the exoticism of the backdrop faded amid the fast pace of the narrative. Literary critic Tom McCarthy highlighted the prominent role of tobacco in the story, drawing on the ideas of French philosopher Jacques Derrida to suggest the potential symbolism of this. He also suggested that the inclusion of mummified Egyptologists in the story warns readers of the "dangers of mummification through interpretation".

== Adaptations ==
Cigars of the Pharaoh was adapted into a 1991 episode of The Adventures of Tintin television series by French studio Ellipse and Canadian animation company Nelvana. Directed by Stéphane Bernasconi, Thierry Wermuth voiced the character of Tintin. In 2010, the television channel Arte filmed an episode of its documentary series, Sur les traces de Tintin (On the track of Tintin), in Egypt exploring the inspiration and setting of the Cigars.

In August 2022, it was announced that Pendulo Studios and Microids would be creating an adventure video game adaptation titled Tintin Reporter – Cigars of the Pharaoh. Footage of the game was revealed in March 2023. It was released on November 7, 2023 for Microsoft Windows, PlayStation 4, PlayStation 5, Xbox One, Xbox Series X/S and Nintendo Switch. It received mixed reviews at launch due to numerous bugs and technical issues that players encountered.
