= The Mystery of the Blue Diamond =

Tintin in India or The Mystery of the Blue Diamond
- Original language: French
- Written by: Hergé and Jacques Van Melkebeke
- Subject: Tintin attempts to rescue a stolen blue diamond
- Genre: Adventure
- Setting: India and Syldavia

Premiere
- Date: 1941
- Place: Théâtre Royal des Galeries, Brussels
- Directed by: Paul Riga

Tintin in India or The Mystery of the Blue Diamond, is a 1941 Belgian theatre piece in three acts written by Hergé and Jacques Van Melkebeke. It features Hergé's famous character, Tintin, and covers much of the second half of Cigars of the Pharaoh as Tintin attempts to rescue a stolen blue diamond. The events of the story occur within the chronology of Tintin stories, between The Crab with the Golden Claws and The Shooting Star.

== History ==
Van Melkebeke wrote the first and third act, with Hergé writing the second act. This was the first time that Hergé worked so closely with another author to write one of his works. The play was performed at the Théâtre Royal des Galeries in Brussels, directed by Paul Riga, and found success with the public. The script of the play is considered to be lost.

It is possible that the inspiration for the diamond comes from the story about Hope Diamond ("le bleu de france").

== List of characters and cast ==
In order of appearance:

- Prime Minister Badapour: Reginald Dourka Romane
- Durant and Durand: Marcel André — the two detectives commonly known (in English) as Thomson and Thompson. Here they are introduced by name for the first time — as "Durant and Durand", although they were later renamed "Dupont and Dupond".
- Dr. Mickey Nickolson: Georges Keppens
- Ms. Nickolson: Nelly Corbusier
- The Maharajah of Padakhore: Franz Joubert
- Mr. Chippendale (archaeologist): Paul Riga
- Madame Chippendale: Christiane Wéry
- Viscount Koulanky, Ambassador of Ruritania: Paul Saussus
- Tintin : Jeanne Rubens
- Fakir Caudebathimouva Thoubva: Dara Gee
- Maharaja's servant: Jean Dusart
- Rampura Lieutenant: Dara Gee

== Synopsis ==
=== Act one ===
Pedakhore Palace, India. The Maharaja and the invited persons enter: The Ambassador to Syldavie Count Koulansky, Doctor Nicholson and his wife, and the nearly deaf archaeologist Chippendale accompanied by his wife. A telegram announces the arrival of Tintin. Count Koulansky is delighted. Since the affairs surrounding The Sceptre of Ottokar, Tintin is popularly considered a hero in Syldavia. A young reporter arrives and the soirée commences. Caudebathimouva Thoubva is to demonstrate hypnotism, followed by a large Indian ballet. At the end of the soirée, the Maharaja has prepared a presentation for those invited on the celebrated blue diamond. However, it is revealed that the diamond has disappeared. Tintin concludes that the thief is amongst the invited. Durant and Durand investigate, but without success. Tintin suggests that those to be questioned continue with him on the voyage to Syldavia aboard the Rampura.

=== Act two ===
Aboard the Rampura, Tintin questions those who were at the events of the night before, but one of the servants of the Maharaja has departed. Tintin decides to send a telegram before the boat arrives in Syldavia.

=== Act three ===
In the medieval hall of the Chateau of Syldavia, Tintin, with the use of his telegram, catches the thief.
