= Jolyon Wagg =

Comic character by Belgian cartoonist Hergé

Publication information
- Publisher: Casterman (Belgium)
- First appearance: The Calculus Affair (1955); The Adventures of Tintin
- Created by: Hergé

In-story information
- Full name: Jolyon Wagg
- Partnerships: List of main characters
- Supporting character of: Tintin

Jolyon Wagg (French: Séraphin Lampion) is a fictional character in The Adventures of Tintin, the comics series by Belgian cartoonist Hergé. He is a gregarious, simple, and overbearing insurance salesman who enters the story by barging in uninvited.

== Character history ==
Jolyon Wagg is disliked by Captain Haddock, who finds him irritating, although Wagg remains cheerfully oblivious and believes himself a great friend of the Captain. Wagg is portrayed as a clueless tourist in the exotic places where Tintin and the Captain have their adventures. He is an insurance salesman by trade, and he often tries to sell other characters insurance. Wagg often quotes his Uncle Anatole, who was a barber.

Jolyon Wagg is based on a salesman who came to Hergé's door and invited himself in, but also on a stereotype of what Hergé called a belgicain, a petty-minded Belgian lacking self-awareness. Wagg appears late in the series, starting with The Calculus Affair (originally serialised in the Tintin magazine, later published as an album), where his self-importance and insensitivity enrage Captain Haddock. Wagg also appears in The Red Sea Sharks, The Castafiore Emerald, Flight 714 to Sydney and Tintin and the Picaros.

Wagg appears six times in The Calculus Affair: twice inviting himself inside Marlinspike Hall (on one of the occasions inside Calculus' laboratory), hiding from gunshots in the adjoining park, interfering with a critical radio transmission (Haddock was attempting to call the police while pursuing Calculus' captors but Wagg assumed that he was joking), repeatedly interrupting Haddock's phone call to Nestor, and moving into Marlinspike Hall with his family for a holiday while Tintin, Haddock and Calculus are away. Tintin, who rarely shows anger, is unaffected. However the Captain is goaded into memorable rants, for example:

It's pointless, Mr. Wagg, I have every kind of insurance possible and imaginable. Yes, everything! I have life insurance, accident insurance; against damage from hail, rain, floods, tidal waves, tornadoes; against cholera, flu and head colds; against mites, termites and locusts. Everything, I tell you! The only insurance I don't have is an insurance against pains in the neck!" (Translated from the French L'Affaire Tournesol, p. 6) (In the English-language version of the book, this is translated to "The only insurance I don't have is against insurance agents!")

Wagg cannot take a hint. He sees himself as Haddock's friend and does not appear to realise that the Captain's outbursts demonstrate genuine dislike for him. When Bianca Castafiore insured her jewels for a large sum of money, Wagg criticised the Captain, saying that as a common "friend" of his and Bianca's, Haddock should have ensured that Wagg got the deal. In fact, Haddock sees both of them as nuisances rather than friends.

In the final Tintin album, Tintin and the Picaros, the tables are turned when Tintin and the Captain steal the costumes from the group with which Wagg is traveling, the Jolly Follies. Wagg has an unusual role in Tintin albums in that, unlike most recurring characters with a role in the plot, he is a relatively average human being (not being criminal, eccentric, dictatorial, or famous). He facilitated Hergé's bringing in a more realistic, domestic mood into the later books. Perhaps reflecting Hergé's dislike of mediocrity, Wagg never accomplishes much, except to get in the way.

In the animated series, his role is greatly diminished, which includes his scenes in The Calculus Affair. He did not appear neither on television episodes of The Red Sea Sharks, The Castafiore Emerald, nor on Flight 714 to Sydney. He also makes a cameo appearance in the televised episode of The Seven Crystal Balls, whereas in the original comic album, he is absent. (The only story in which he has a major appearance is "Tintin and the Picaros") His family has also been completely removed.

== Naming ==
Names in Tintin are not always literally translated but rather turned into a different joke. What Hergé intended in French is not possible to translate directly, however he "wanted something 'puffed up', a tone which expressed at the same time fleshy and weak." Wagg's original French name, Séraphin Lampion [se.ʁa.fɛ̃ lɑ̃.pjɔ̃], is a contrast between the first name meaning seraphim, and the last name meaning a "chintzy little lamp of the sort Wagg would use to decorate his home", or perhaps alternatively "a show off".

== See also ==
- List of The Adventures of Tintin characters
