= Jacques Van Melkebeke =

Belgian painter, comic strip writer and journalist

- Born: 12 December 1904; Brussels, Belgium
- Died: 8 June 1983 (aged 78)
- Occupations: painter, journalist, writer
- Writing career
- Pen name: George Jacquet

Jacques Van Melkebeke (12 December 1904 – 8 June 1983) was a Belgian painter, journalist, writer, and comic strip writer. He was the first chief editor of Tintin magazine and wrote scripts and articles anonymously for many of their publications.

A friend of Hergé, Van Melkebeke took part in a semi-official way in the development of some of the storylines of The Adventures of Tintin, adding a number of cultural references. He is also supposed to have contributed to certain elements of the Blake and Mortimer series, although Edgar P. Jacobs disputed this fact. Van Melkebeke's personality was one of the main sources of inspiration for the Blake and Mortimer character Philip Angus Mortimer.

== Career ==
Born in Brussels, Van Melkebeke was a childhood friend of Edgar Jacobs and Jacques Laudy. He spent his twenties pursuing fine art painting.

During the German occupation of Belgium during World War II, Van Melkebeke was responsible for main articles in Le Soir Jeunesse, the children's supplement of the daily newspaper Le Soir. During this period, when he first crossed paths with Hergé, Van Melkebeke's strip Les Nouvelles Aventures du Baron de Crac ran in Le Soir as well. As a fine arts painter himself, Van Melkebeke encouraged Hergé's own interest in art, introducing him to art world figures of the time. Van Melkebeke painted a portrait of Hergé which hung in the cartoonist's home for many decades.

Van Melkebeke co-wrote with Hergé two Tintin plays which were staged from 1941 to 1942: Tintin in India: The Mystery of the Blue Diamond and Mr. Boullock's Disappearance.

Although he had primarily written cultural articles, after the war Van Melkebeke's position at Le Soir Jeunesse resulted in a 1945 judgment of collaboration and of incitement of racial hatred. This suspicion of "incivism" prevented Van Melkebeke from continuing a regular career in journalism; for instance, after Van Melkebeke became the first editor of Tintin magazine in 1946, he was immediately forced to step down.

From that point, Van Melkebeke worked under the pseudonym George Jacquet or as a ghostwriter, on such projects as Tintin, Laudy's strip Hassan et Kaddour, and Paul Cuvelier's Corentin.

In the mid-1950s Van Melkebeke worked on a new children's comic strip called Les Farces de l'Empereur for Ons Volkske/Chez Nous.

In 1954, Van Melkebeke suggested to Hergé the idea of setting Tintin in Tibet (1958–1960) in that country, possibly being influenced by the fact that he had set the play Mr. Boullock's Disappearance there.

As a prank, Van Melkebeke once wrote a fake letter to Tintin magazine demanding that an insult Captain Haddock used – "Pneumothorax" – be removed. (A pneumothorax is a medical emergency caused by the collapse of the lung within the chest). The letter was allegedly from a father whose boy was a great fan of Tintin and also a heavy tuberculosis sufferer who had experienced a collapsed lung. According to the letter, the boy was devastated that his favourite comic made fun of his own condition. Hergé wrote an apology and removed the word from the comic.

Van Melkebeke spent his later years returning to the field of fine art painting.

== Personal life ==
Van Melkebeke's daughter Chantal, a teacher, is married to the Japanese film critic and academic researcher Shigehiko Hasumi. He identified himself as an atheist.

== Appearances in Tintin ==
When Hergé started working with collaborators such as Jacobs, he would herald their contribution by having them make cameo appearances in his albums. The ever-smiling Van Melkebeke thus appears in Tintin stories such as:

- The Secret of the Unicorn (1943) – page 2, panel 14, where he is examining a book as a man calls out that his suitcase is being stolen
- Tintin in the Congo (1946, color version) – page 1, panel 1, as one of the reporters seeing Tintin off on his adventure
- King Ottokar's Sceptre (1947) – page 59, panel 6, when Tintin is about to be knighted
- The Seven Crystal Balls (1948) – page 57, panel 2, in the background when General Alcazar is boarding the steamer at Saint-Nazaire harbour
