= Syldavia =

Fictional country in The Adventures of Tintin

- The Adventures of Tintin location
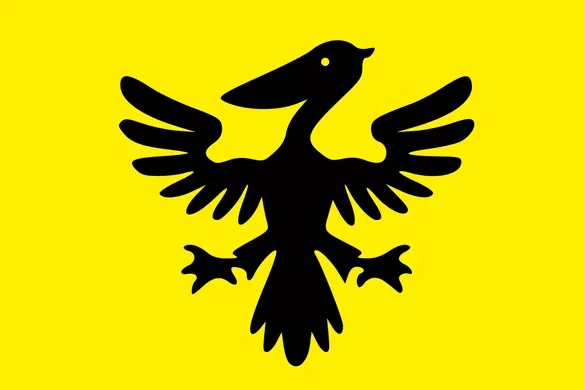
- Flag

- The Balkans, general location of Syldavia and Borduria
- First appearance: King Ottokar's Sceptre (1938–1939)
- Last appearance: Tintin and the Lake of Sharks (1972)
- Created by: Hergé

In-universe information
- Other name: Kingdom of Syldavia
- Type: Absolute monarchy
- Ruled by: King Muskar XII
- Ethnic group: Syldavian
- Locations: Klow (capital)
- Motto: Syldavian/Latin: Eih bennek, eih blavek. Syldavian/Cyrillic: Ейщ беннек, ейщ блавек. English: Here I Am, Here I Stay.
- Anthem: Syldavians unite! Praise our King's might: The Sceptre his right!
- Language(s): Syldavian
- Currency: Khôr

Syldavia (Syldavian: Zyldavja) is a fictional country in The Adventures of Tintin, the comics series by Belgian cartoonist Hergé. It is located in the Balkans and has a rivalry with the fictional neighbouring country of Borduria. Syldavia is depicted in King Ottokar's Sceptre (1938–1939), Destination Moon (1950), Explorers on the Moon (1952–1953, briefly), The Calculus Affair (1954–1956), and Tintin and the Lake of Sharks (1972), and is mentioned in Tintin and the Picaros (1975–1976).

According to Harry Thompson's 2011 Tintin: Hergé and Its Creation, Syldavia "was an idealised portrayal of central Europe between the wars – a benevolent monarchy, peaceful village life, sturdy peasants puffing on large pipes."

Hergé claimed that the country is heavily inspired by the real-world countries of both Albania and Montenegro, and may also be based on larger Balkan nations such as Serbia, Romania and Bulgaria.

== Overview ==
Syldavia is a monarchy, ruled at the time of King Ottokar's Sceptre by King Muskar XII. The capital is Klow, formerly Zileheroum, located at the confluence of the Moltus and Vladir Rivers (after Prague, which is on the Vltava River). Other cities named in the books are Niedzdrow, Istov, Dbrnouk, Douma, Tesznik, and Zlip. The population of Syldavia is 642,000 with 122,000 living in Klow, suggesting the country is similar in size to Montenegro. The national airline is Syldair and the official currency is the khôr. One khôr is subdivided into 100 paroe.

The people speak Syldavian, a language that looks and sounds Slavic but is mostly based on the West Germanic Marols dialect from Brussels. It is written in Cyrillic, but curiously, the Latin alphabet is used in medieval documents, and some of the Cyrillic letters used are a straight transcription from the Latin letters (e.g., "sh" is written "сз" -compare to Polish "sz"- rather than "ш").

The kingdom's motto is "Eih bennek, eih blavek!" which Hergé translates as "Qui s'y frotte s'y pique" "Who rubs himself there gets stung" (in fact, the motto of Nancy, from the Latin non inultus premor, referring to its emblem, the thistle; in the British edition, the translators rendered the motto "If you gather Thistles, expect Prickles"). The motto can also be interpreted as a Brussels dialect rendering of the Dutch phrase "Hier ben ik, hier blijf ik" ("Here I am, here I stay").

Syldavians seem to be fond of mineral water, which does not go down well with the whisky-drinking Captain Haddock, one of Tintin's travelling companions.

The exact location of Syldavia is not given in the comics, and nothing more is known than that it is located on the Balkan Peninsula, bordering another fictional country Borduria, and that it has access to the sea. It is also mistaken for Greece in one instance, but explained as having very different local clothing. In Destination Moon, the trail of the Syldavian-launched rocket points to a location north of the Danube. There are various inspirations for Syldavia. As Hergé noted, the primary inspiration was Montenegro, but the country's history is modeled after many Balkan countries. Har Brok writes that Syldavia "may have been modelled after a country like Romania or Yugoslavia".

Syldavia is also known for exporting violinists.

== History ==
The region of Syldavia was inhabited by nomadic tribes of unknown origin until the 6th century, when it was overrun by Slavs. It was conquered in the 10th century by the Turks, who occupied the plains forcing the Slavs into the mountains (in reality, the Balkans were conquered in the 14th century). The modern Syldavia was formed in 1127 when a tribal chief called Hveghi defeated the Turkish conquerors at the battle of Zileheroum and took the name Muskar, ruling until 1168. Although he was a successful ruler, his son Muskar II was an inferior king as ruler. Borduria conquered the country during the reign of Muskar II in 1195 until Ottokar I (his real name and title being Baron Almaszout) drove them away in 1275.

King Ottokar IV became King in 1360. He took away the power of many upstart nobles. When an enemy, Baron Staszrvitch, claimed the Throne and attacked him with his sword, Ottokar struck him to the ground with his sceptre. The King then said the motto and decreed that the ruler of Syldavia must have hold on the sceptre, otherwise he would lose his authority, as it had saved his life. This custom had the power of law as late as 1939.

In 1939 Syldavia was nearly invaded by its neighbor Borduria, part of a plot to oust King Muskar XII. The sceptre was stolen in the hope that the king would abdicate. Tintin had a hand in defusing the situation by returning the sceptre just before St Vladmir's day. The Bordurians then announced they were withdrawing troops 15 miles from the borders. (The situation was very similar to that of Anschluss in Austria in 1938 though the conclusion was not the same.)

King Muskar XII is a keen motorist who drives himself with only an aide for escort and carries his own pistol for protection. He appears in elaborate hussar dress for court and public ceremonies and in a plainer uniform on other occasions. Muskar XII is an actual ruler rather than a constitutional monarch (see enlightened absolutism). He himself ordered his ministers and generals to make the moves necessary to prevent the coup and the invasion. King Muskar XII is married, but his queen's name is not known.

The king is notably absent from the other stories set in or involving Syldavia – The Calculus Affair and Explorers on the Moon. Both were set after World War II, at a time when the various Balkan monarchies providing models for the fictional Syldavia had been overthrown and their rulers exiled. It is not clear what form of government is in power in the post-war Syldavia.

== National symbols ==
The achievement of arms of Syldavia

The Syldavian achievement of arms is shown on the title page and page 62 of the King Ottokar's Sceptre album. It would be blazoned heraldically as follows:

Quarterly, first and fourth Or a pelican displayed sable, second and third gules two increscents in fess argent; for a crest, on a barred helmet affronty or, mantled azure doubled Or, the Royal Crown of Syldavia proper; behind the shield the Royal Sceptre of Syldavia and a sceptre of justice in saltire; the motto "Eih bennek, eih blavek" on a scroll below the shield, pendent therefrom the badge of the Order of the Golden Pelican.

The flag of Syldavia is seen on page 59 of King Ottokar's Sceptre, as the King's procession passes onlooking crowds. It appears to be identical to first and fourth quarter of the coat of arms, that being Or a pelican displayed sable. The flag is seen earlier, flying on a toy castle, on page 44. A potential maritime ensign is seen on page 61, as Tintin and the detectives are piloted on a boat to a seaplane, on the back of it having a white flag with the words SYLDAVIA written in black.

== Language ==
In their book Tintin Ketje de Bruxelles (Casterman, 2004 ISBN 2-203-01716-3), Daniel Justens and Alain Préaux have documented how the Syldavian language is based on Marols or Marollien, the dialect of the Marollen, a formerly working-class (though now trendy) quarter of Brussels. Marols, which Hergé learnt from his grandmother, is a form of Dutch incorporating many words of French origin as well as a sprinkling of Spanish. Syldavian seems to incorporate features of various Central European languages into the Marols foundation to suit Hergé's taste, such as German, Polish, Czech, and Hungarian. It is written both in Cyrillic and in Latin script, like Serbian.

Educated Syldavians are shown speaking Tintin's language (French in the original). There is a hint that German is the predominant second language among the less educated, as in one scene when Haddock complains he is thirsty, a Syldavian soldier does not understand him until he yells "ich bin durstig". At that time, German was the dominant lingua franca in Central and Eastern Europe, and Syldavians would be expected to have a better command of German than most other Central or Eastern Europeans, as their language is related to German.

Within the universe, the existence of the Germanic Syldavian language (and most likely Bordurian as well) may be explained as having been brought by the in-migration of German-speakers, such as the real-life Transylvanian Saxons and Danube Swabians, perhaps as part of the larger Ostsiedlung, but whose language diverged over a thousand years due to relative isolation from the rest of the Germanic-speaking world and contact with other groups, which is in fact not unlike how Romanian developed.

== Cuisine ==
Syldavian cuisine appears to be typical of Eastern Europe; blini, herbs, sausage and garnish are seen in the kitchen of a Syldavian restaurant in King Ottokar's Sceptre. Mineral water is an important export, and alcohol is scarce, much to Captain Haddock's disgust. When Haddock tries to bring in alcohol with him when visiting Calculus at the research facility, he is hit with high alcohol duty.

It is mentioned that a prime dish in the country is szlaszeck, described by a waiter as the hind leg of a young dog in a heavy Syldavian sauce. However, this may not be true as the waiter was deliberately attempting to disturb Tintin. Szlaszeck (apparently from Polish szaszłyk, "shish kebab") is served to Tintin with mushrooms and a salad.

== Atomic research ==
In the 1950s Syldavia had a secret but successful space program in the area of Sbrodj (named Sprodj in the English edition).

The Sprodj Atomic Research Centre, seen in Destination Moon and Explorers on the Moon, is located in Syldavia. The sprawling complex is located in the Zmyhlpathian Mountains of Syldavia (a play on the Carpathian Mountains), located close to rich deposits of uranium. The Centre is secretive and has very tightly-guarded security, including a large number of security checkpoints, helicopter surveillance, anti-aircraft artillery, and a squadron of fighter aircraft based at the facility. Work at the centre, carried out by a large team of international physicists recruited by the Syldavian government, involves research into protection from the effects of nuclear weapons and is the base for the Syldavian space program. The facility, which seems to be entirely self-sufficient, is administered by the Director, Mr. Baxter. The Sprodj Centre has its own atomic pile for processing uranium into plutonium and has vast facilities for the research and construction of the rocket-ship which carries Tintin and his colleagues to the Moon. The gargantuan complex is last seen at the end of Explorers on the Moon and is never again seen in the Tintin series.

In Destination Moon, the Sprodj Atomic Research Centre invites Professor Calculus to head its space division, and later Tintin and Captain Haddock to be part of the Moon mission. In The Calculus Affair, Syldavia's secret agents compete with archrival Bordurian agents to kidnap Professor Calculus and obtain the secrets to develop sound-based weapons.

== National dance ==
The Blushtika, meaning "Goat Dance Twisting", as seen in Tintin and the Lake of Sharks.

== National lake ==
The national lake is "Pollishoff", meaning "Lake of Sharks". The inspiration for this lake seems to be various lakes in the southern Balkans, particularly the Ohrid, Skadar or Prespa.

== National defence and ceremonial military units ==
By 1930s standards Syldavia has a modern military, equipped with anti-aircraft guns and radar stations. It appears to have well prepared defensive systems with checkpoints and bunkers.

The army has an Eastern European appearance, possibly modeled on that of Poland or Czechoslovakia. The helmets used resemble those of Switzerland however. The uniforms have standing collars and rank indications are worn on the collar. The green-uniformed armed police or gendarmerie are stationed in both rural and urban areas.

The Royal Guard wear hussar uniforms, a style which originated in Eastern Europe. The ceremonial guards at the Royal Treasure House, Klow have elaborate costumes of traditional Balkan design and are armed with halberds.

== Capital ==
The capital of Syldavia is Klow. The city was founded in the 10th century by the invading Turks and was then named Zileheroum. The Magyar nomads that lived there were forced to live in the Zmyhlpathernian mountains, while the Turks themselves settled in the newly founded city located in the lush hills. In the year 1127, the nomads, led by their chief Hveghi, defeated and drove away the Turkish conquerors. Hveghi took the name Muskar, meaning "the brave" and Zileheroum was renamed to Klow, meaning "freetown" from kloho ("freedom") and ow (town). In 1168, Muskar died and was succeeded by his son Muskar II. Muskar II, however, was weak, and the neighboring Bordurians took over the country.

Klow has a wide variety of cultural styles. Mostly typical Yugoslavian, there are also many buildings of Austrian and Turkish appearance, for example, the old mosques. However, the Kropow castle's architecture and decoration are of Bohemian pattern, but this could be because of the fame of Czech architecture.

As a large and relatively well-off capital city, Klow has a large museum of natural science with mounted dinosaur skeletons. Klow is said to be the Capital of Mineral Water, and they are famous for their Klowaswa (Cyrillic: Кловасва), their national mineral water, literally meaning "Klow Water" or "Water from Klow". In contrast to ordinary Syldavians, who use Cyrillic, the Royal Court in Klow uses the Latin alphabet.

== In popular culture ==
The song Sildavia from the Spanish group La Unión (Mil Siluetas, 1984) mentions this country as a land of dreams. The Dutch group Flairck also has a song called Syldavian Waltz, featured in their album The Emigrant (Syldavische wals, De Emigrant, 1989).

Since the 1990s, Syldavia has inspired the creation of fictional Syldavian consulates by Tintin enthusiasts around the world. These artistic projects, parodying official diplomatic institutions, have appeared in various forms including websites, performances, and installations. Cities hosting such symbolic representations include Herstal (Belgium), Poitiers (France), Toronto (Canada), and Bangkok (Thailand).

== Original stories ==
Tintin stories featuring Syldavia:

- Le Sceptre d'Ottokar (King Ottokar's Sceptre, 1939)
- Objectif Lune (Destination Moon, 1953)
- On a marché sur la Lune (Explorers on the Moon, 1954, for Earth scenes only)
- L'Affaire Tournesol (The Calculus Affair, 1956)
- Tintin and the Lake of Sharks (1972)

== See also ==
- Borduria
- Fictional European countries
