= 433 Tactical Fighter Squadron =

433 Squadron
- Active: 1943-1945; 1954-1961; 1968-2005; 2015-
- Country: Canada
- Branch: (Canada) Royal Canadian Air Force
- Nickname: Porcupine
- Mottos: Qui s'y frotte s'y pique ("Who opposes it gets hurt")
- Battle honours: English Channel & North Sea 1944-1945; Baltic 1944-1945; Fortress Europe 1944; France & Germany 1944-1945; Biscay Ports 1944; Ruhr 1944-1945; Berlin 1944; German Ports 1944-1945; Normandy 1944; Rhine; Biscay 1944

433 Squadron is a unit of the Royal Canadian Air Force. It operates CF-18 Hornet fighter jets from CFB Bagotville in Quebec, Canada. As of 2024, its Commanding Officer is Lieutenant Colonel Aaron Dhillon.

== History ==
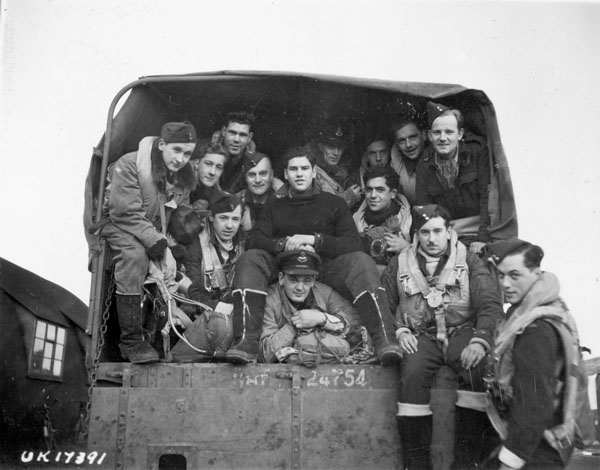
Aircrew of No. 433 (Porcupine) Squadron, RCAF: en route to their Handley Page Halifax B.III aircraft before taking off to raid Hagen, Germany, 2 December 1944

No. 433 Squadron formed at RAF Skipton-on-Swale on 25 September 1943, but was without aircraft for nearly two months. When these arrived they were the latest version of the Handley Page Halifax, the Mk III, and No. 433 worked up on them to begin operations on 2 January 1944. For the next year the squadron was continuously operational on Halifaxes over the Continent by night. In January 1945 the Halifaxes were replaced by Avro Lancaster Mk Is, and No. 433 used these for three months, by which time the war in Europe had come to an end. No. 433 was not disbanded but, as part of No. 1 Group, flew trooping flights from Germany and Italy, bringing back troops and POWs. This continued until 15 October 1945, when the squadron disbanded at Skipton-on-Swale.

No. 433 Squadron reformed as an All-Weather (Fighter) unit at CFB Cold Lake, Alberta, on 15 November 1954, and moved to CFB North Bay, Ontario, in October 1955, the squadron flew CF-100 Canuck aircraft on North American air defence until disbanded on 1 August 1961.

Reformed post-unification No. 433 Escadrille tactique de combat (ETAC) was a French language squadron of Mobile Command based at CFB Bagotville, Quebec. No. 433 Escadrille flew the CF-5 Freedom Fighter in the tactical and reconnaissance role until conversion to the CF-188 Hornet fighter jets in 1984.

The squadron was deactivated in 2005, and its assets and personnel amalgamated into 425 Tactical Fighter Squadron.

The squadron was reactivated on 9 June 2015.

The squadron celebrated its 75th anniversary on 15 September 2018.

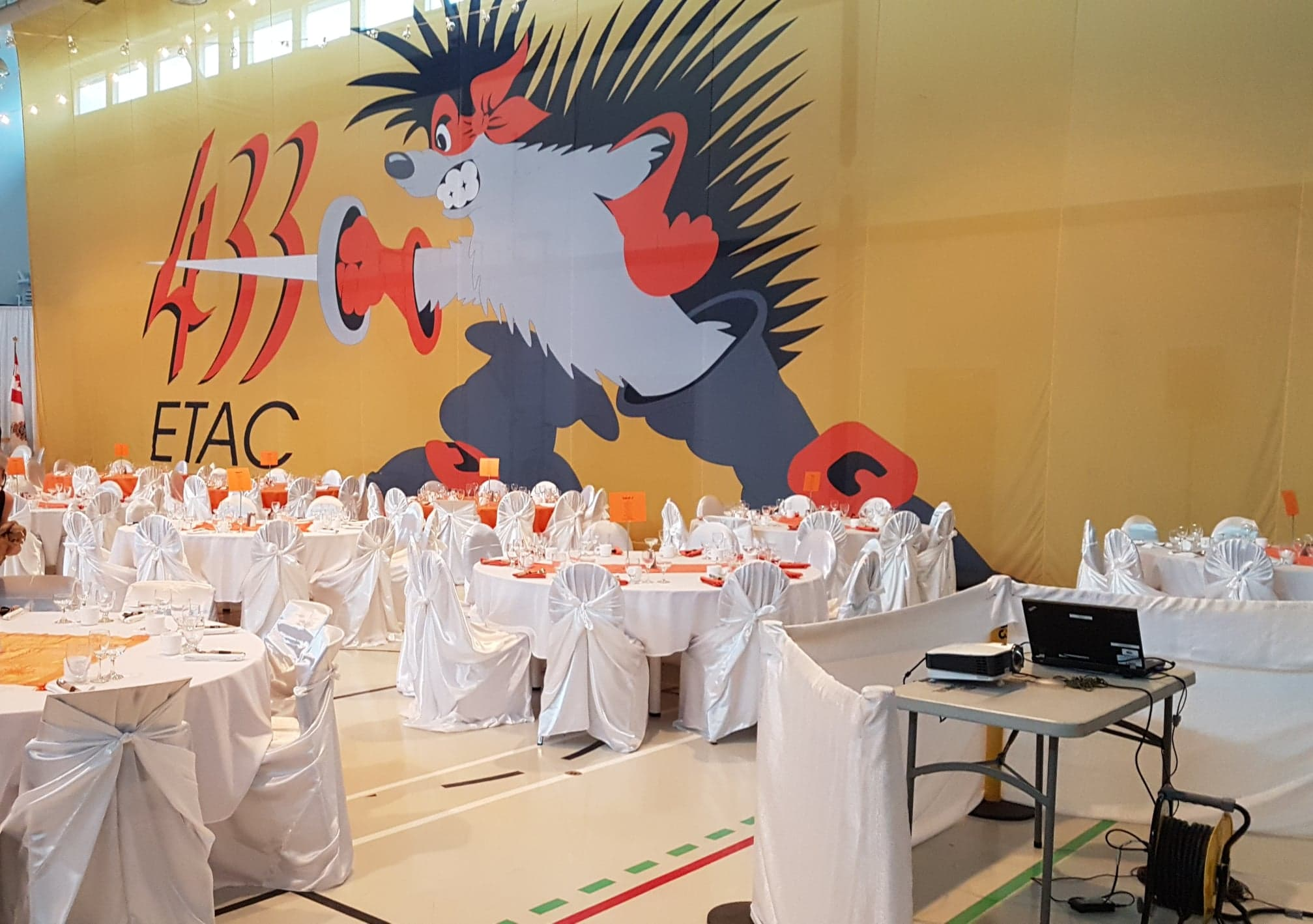
The 433 ETAC Flag at the 75th Anniversary Mess Dinner in Chicoutimi, Qc.

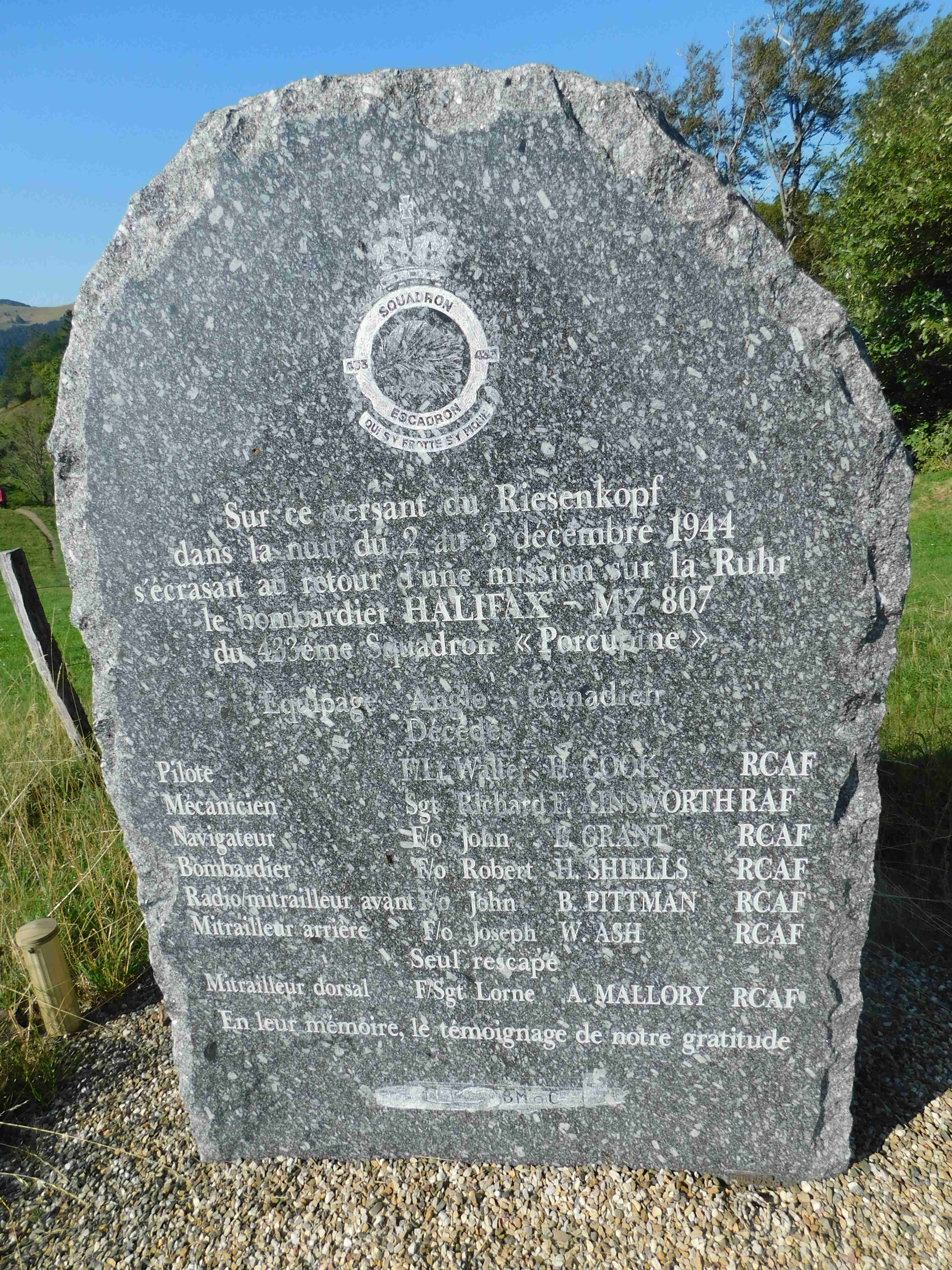
Monument dedicated to 433rd Squadron in Freudstein

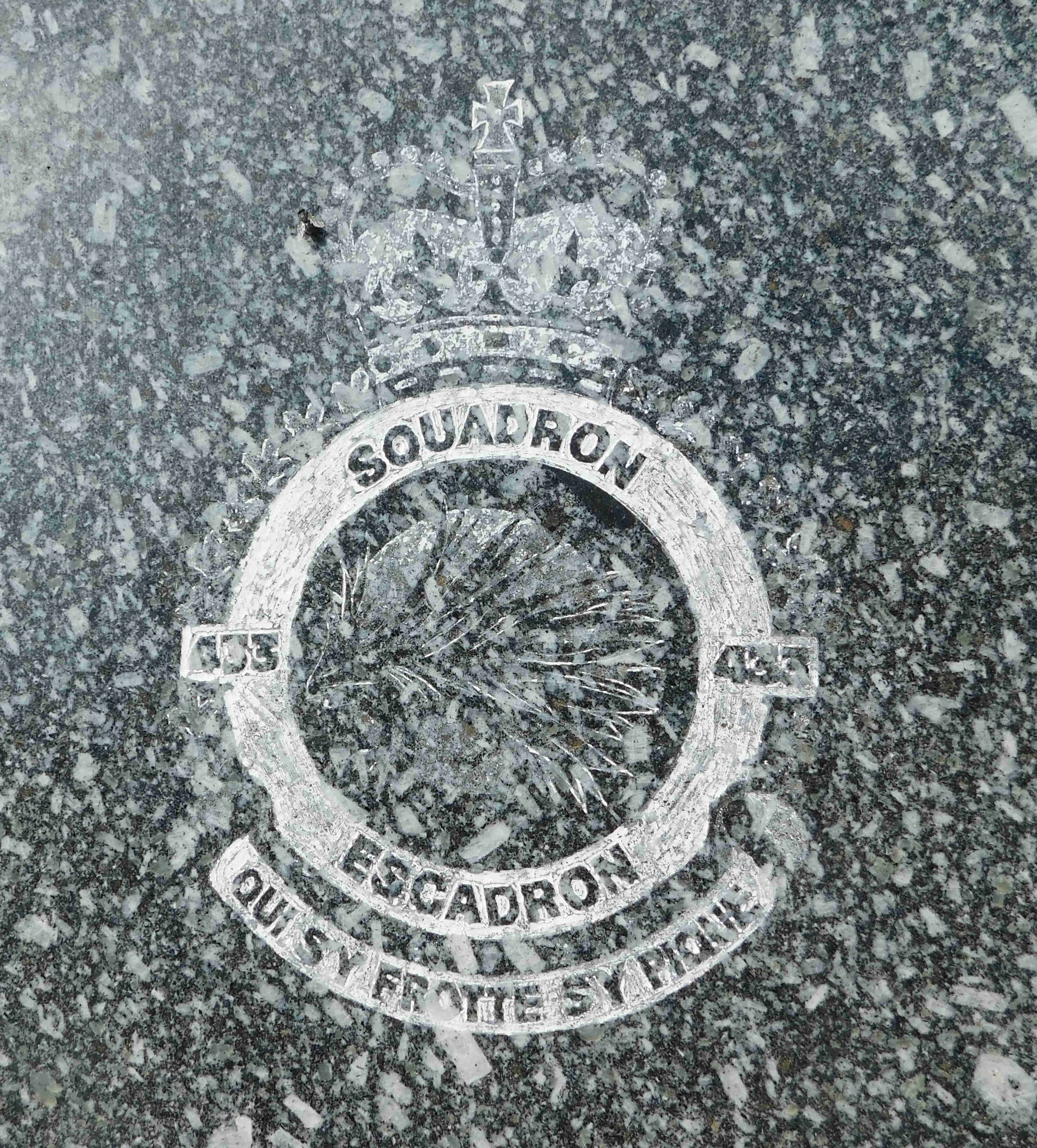
Pucelle du 433rd Squadron

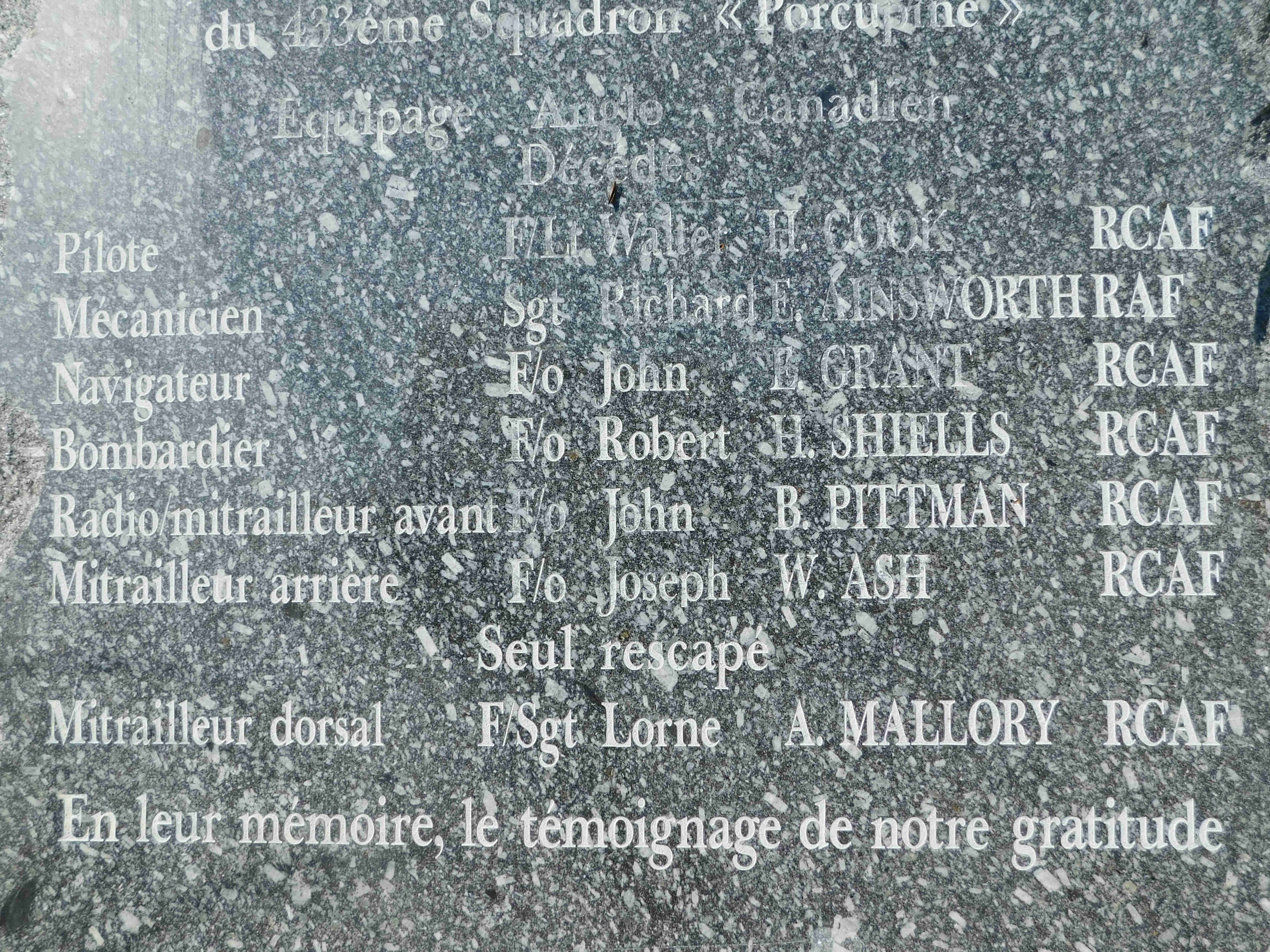
"On this mountainside of the Riesenkopf in the night of the 2nd and 3rd december 1944 crashed coming back from a mission in the Ruhr the bomber HALIFAX - MZ 807 from the 433rd Squadron "Porcupine""
