= Qui s'y frotte s'y pique =

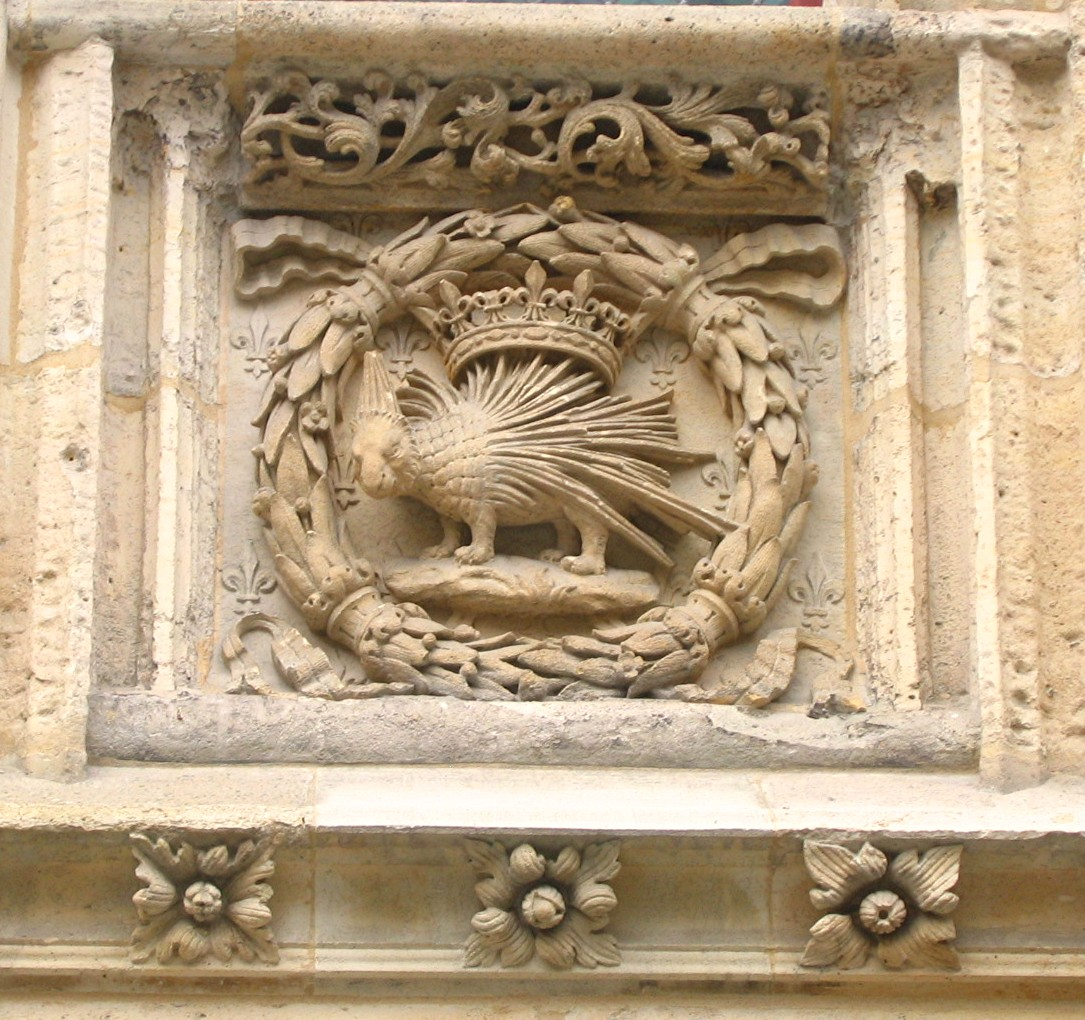
Louis XII's real motto, "Cominus et eminus", on the Hôtel de Bourgtheroulde in Rouen.

Qui s'y frotte s'y pique is a French proverb which appeared at the end of the 16th century, roughly translating as "Whoever rubs it gets pricked". It has been erroneously asserted that it was a motto of the Dukes of Orléans and King Louis XII. It is often associated with an image of a porcupine. However, the original late 14th-century motto with that animal for the Dukes and Louis was a Latin one, "Cominus et eminus" (near and far, referring to the medieval myth that porcupines could shoot their quills at enemies at a distance as well as prick them when touched, making them a symbol of warrior virtues).

It can also be considered as an interpretation of the town motto of Nancy, France, which is linked to an image of a thistle, or to be the ancient Créquy or Villéon families from Brittany. It is similar to nemo me impune lacessit, used in 1687 by James VII of Scotland for his Order of the Thistle or Louis XI's device of a bundle of thistles with the motto "Non nu tus premor" ("Nobody touches me without punishment"), which could be considered a free translation of "qui s'y frotte s'y pique" or vice versa.

== History ==
In 1394 Louis I, Duke of Orléans founded the Order of the Porcupine, and gave it his own device of a porcupine with the motto "cominus et eminus". This became the Dukes' device and was kept by Louis I's grandson when he became Louis XII of France. It appeared on his coinage, coats of arms and official buildings built under him such as the hôtel de Bourgtheroulde in Rouen.

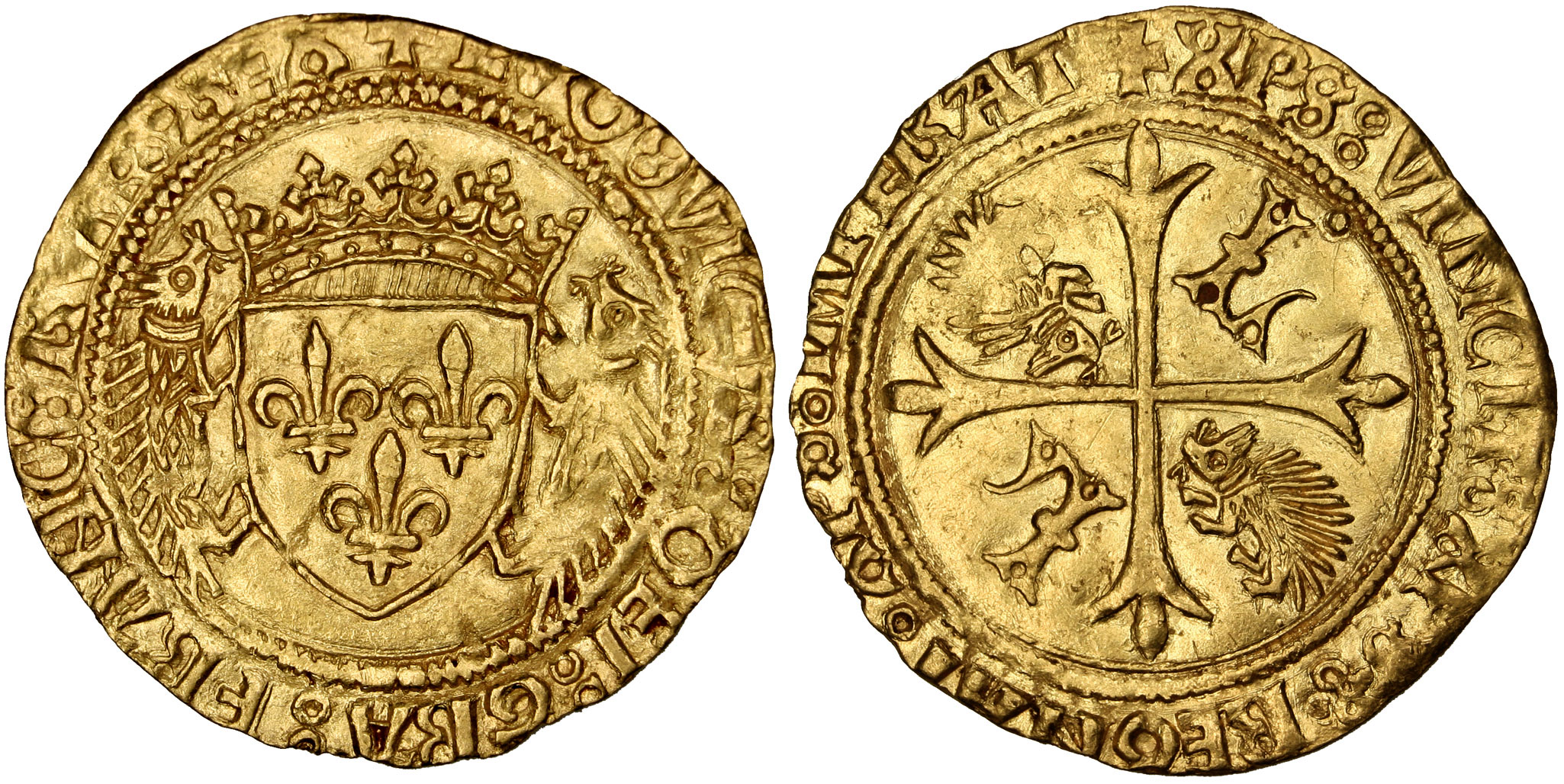
Écu d'or showing a porcupine, minted under Louis XII.

"Qui s'y frotte s'y pique" first appeared at the end of the 16th century and thus was erroneously attributed as part of Louis XII's device. This misattribution was an enduring one, appearing at the end of the 18th century in the Dictionnaire de l'Académie française and in 19th century historical works.

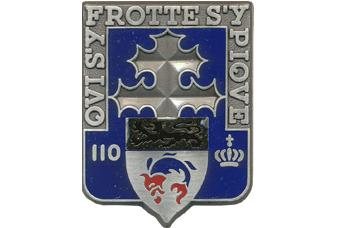
Badge of the 110th Infantry Regiment.

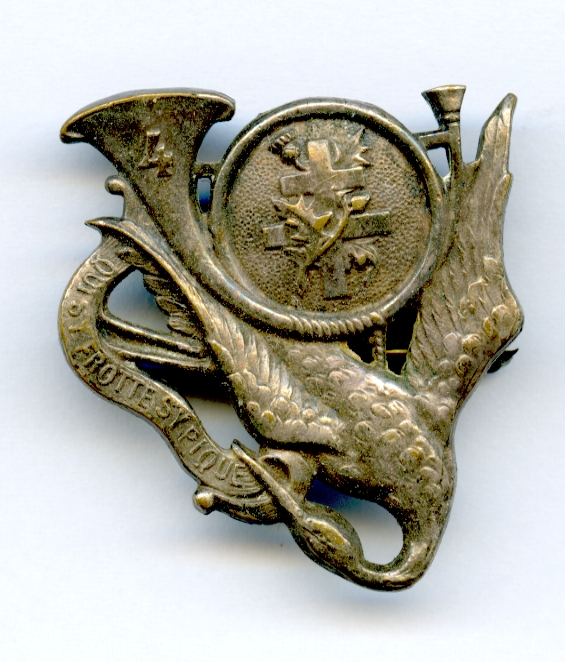
Device on the insignia of the 4th Foot Chasseur Battalion.

Due to the Battle of Nancy in 1477 "Qui s'y frotte..." was often considered as a translation of Nancy's motto "Non inultus premor" ("Don't touch me, I prick" or "Nobody seizes me without wounding himself") in reference to the Lorraine thistle. It was also the motto of France's 110th Infantry Regiment, 4th Foot Chasseur Battalion, SPA 38 Squadron and their successor units and Canada's 433 Tactical Fighter Squadron.

== Uses in fiction ==
In the Tintin book King Ottokar's Sceptre Hergé made Qui s'y frotte s'y pique as a French translation of "Eih bennek, eih blavek", the motto of the fictional state of Syldavia and first uttered by its king Ottokar IV. Later in the book it explains that - to defend himself against an attacker - that king "struck him on the head with his sceptre, knocking him to his feet and crying out in Syldavian "Eih bennek, eih blavek", which roughly means "Qui s'y frotte s'y pique"". The Syldavian version of the phrase was inspired by the Brusselian dialect, which Hergé knew - "Eih bennek, eih blâvek" is the Brusselian pronunciation of the Dutch phrase "Hier ben ik, hier blijf ik" ("Here I stand, here I stay").

"Qui s'y frotte s'y pique" is also the motto of AS Nancy Lorraine and SC Toulon, which has a scorpionfish as its emblem. It is also the Francophone title for the Simpsons episode On a Clear Day I Can't See My Sister and the Mickey Mouse film The Cactus Kid.
