= Syldavian =

Fictional West Germanic language

- Зйлдав, Zyldav
- Pronunciation: /zɪldav/
- Created by: Hergé
- Date: 1939
- Setting and usage: The Adventures of Tintin
- Ethnicity: Syldavians
- Users: 642,000 (1939) (fictional)
- Purpose: Indo-European: Germanic; West Germanic; Weser–Rhine Germanic; Low Franconian; Dutch; Brabantian; Southern; Pajots; Brusselian; Syldavian
- Writing system: Cyrillic; Latin
- Sources: Dutch; Marols

Official status
- Official language in: Syldavia
- Regulated by: unknown

Language codes
- ISO 639-3: None (mis)
- Glottolog: None
- IETF: art-x-syldavia

Syldavian is a fictional West Germanic language created by Hergé as the national language of Syldavia, a fictional Balkan kingdom that serves as a major setting in many of The Adventures of Tintin stories. Hergé modeled the language on Brusselian, a dialect of Dutch spoken in and around Brussels. The entire corpus of the language has been analyzed by Mark Rosenfelder.

== Characteristics ==
As presented in the Tintin books, Syldavian has a superficial resemblance to certain Central European languages, particularly Polish and Hungarian, due to its orthography. Like Serbian, it uses both the Cyrillic and Latin scripts, although apparently in somewhat different contexts; it is most commonly written in the Cyrillic alphabet, albeit with the Latin alphabet by the royal court. It shares numerous orthographic features found in various Eastern European languages, most notably the "sz" and "cz" of Polish.

However, the language is clearly a Germanic language. Its vocabulary and grammar resembles that of Dutch and German and has little in common with any Slavic languages. But while Brusselian, Hergé's native dialect, was used as a basis for the language, Syldavian has a much more complicated grammar, with other Central European influences added.

The language also appears to have been influenced by Bordurian (another fictional language), Slavic languages and Turkish. The Syldavians often bear names of Slavic origin, such as Wladimir; the dish szlaszeck that Tintin encountered also appears to be a borrowing. (Szaszłyk is the Polish word for shish kebab, borrowed in turn from Turkish.) Many words are based on common French slangs. For examples, klebcz is constructed on the French Parisian slang clebs meaning "dog".

This language, which is Germanic but bears a great resemblance to Polish, may be likened to the artificial Romance language Wenedyk, or to the endangered Wymysorys language.

== Phonology ==
Syldavian boasts a rich range of sounds.

=== Vowels ===
In addition to the diacritical marks shown in the chart below, there are acute and grave accents that may indicate stress.

Roman letters are on the left, Cyrillic letters on the right.

	Front		Back
	unrounded	rounded	Back
Close	i ⟨i,и⟩	y ⟨ü,ы⟩	u ⟨u,у⟩
Near-close	ɪ ⟨y,й⟩		ʊ ⟨û,ў⟩
Close-mid	e ⟨e,е⟩	ø ⟨ö,ё⟩	o ⟨o,о⟩
Open-mid	æ~ɛ ⟨ä,я⟩		ɔ ⟨ô,о⟩
Near-open	æ~ɛ ⟨ä,я⟩		
Open	a ⟨a,а⟩		

In addition to these letters, Syldavian also contains several digraphs and letters for which the pronunciation is uncertain:

- ⟨â⟩ - uncertain, possibly /æ/
- ⟨ï⟩ - uncertain. Likely a diaeresis indicating to pronounce as syllabic /i/ rather than /j/, or for the benefit of French-speakers so they do not mispronounce ai as /ɛː/ instead of the correct /aj/.
- ⟨oe⟩ - /ø/
- ⟨ou⟩ - /ou/
- ⟨eu⟩ - uncertain: perhaps the vowel /œ/ or /ø/, perhaps a diphthong /eu/ or /ɛu/. It is only seen in one word: teuïh ("door").
- ⟨ei⟩ - /ei/

=== Consonants ===
Roman letters are on the left, Cyrillic letters on the right.

	Bilabial	Labiodental	Alveolar	Postalveolar	Palatal	Velar	Glottal
Nasal	m ⟨m,м⟩		n ⟨n,н⟩				
Plosive	p ⟨p,п⟩ b ⟨b,б⟩		t ⟨t,т⟩ d ⟨d,д⟩			k ⟨k,к⟩ ɡ ⟨g,г⟩	
Fricative	β ⟨v,ю⟩	f ⟨f,ф⟩ v ⟨w,в⟩	s ⟨s,с⟩ z ⟨z,з⟩	ʃ ⟨sz,сз⟩ ʒ ⟨zs,зс⟩		x ⟨kh,х⟩ ɣ ⟨gh,гз⟩	h ⟨h,щ⟩
Affricate			t͡s ⟨tz,тз⟩ d͡z ⟨dz,дз⟩	t͡ʃ ⟨cz,ч⟩ d͡ʒ ⟨dj,дч⟩			
Trill			r ⟨r,р⟩ r̝ ⟨rz,рз⟩				
Approximant			l ⟨l,л⟩		j ⟨j,й⟩		

Note: As in Czech, the letter ⟨r⟩ can be syllabic, as seen in names such as Staszrvitch and Dbrnouk.

There are some additional digraphs and trigraphs, including ⟨tch⟩ (used in names and pronounced with /t͡ʃ/, the apparent Syldavian version of the common Serbo-Croatian/Balkan surname ending -ić), ⟨chz⟩ (uncertain, but may be an alternative form of ⟨cz⟩ /t͡ʃ/), and ⟨th⟩ /t/. These demonstrate that the Latin-based orthography has a number of irregularities, or else these are old inconsistent spellings that have been preserved in family names but are no longer used in the standard orthography (as in Hungarian, where for example one may find the family name Széchenyi retaining a traditional spelling rather than the orthographically correct *Szécsenyi).

Note that Syldavian Cyrillic diverges in some important respects from Cyrillic as used in real-world languages, most notably by porting over Latin digraphs into the Cyrillic alphabet (for example, /ʃ/ is written "сз" instead of "ш"), and to use a few Cyrillic letters (щ, ю) for sounds for which they are never used in the real world. This, together with the use of Latin script in old medieval manuscripts, may suggest that the Syldavians adopted the Latin alphabet first, and the Cyrillic later, which is the reverse of several real-world languages (most notably Romanian) which switched from Cyrillic to Latin.

== Grammar ==
=== Plurals ===
- Native words are pluralized with -en: klebczen - "dogs"; fläszen - "bottles"
- Loanwords are pluralized with -es: zigarettes - "cigarettes"

=== Definite articles ===
Unlike Marols, but like German (shown in italics in the table), Syldavian definite articles are extensively inflected.

	Masc./Fem.	Neut.	Plural
Nom.	dze der/die	dascz das	dzoe die
Acc.	dzem den/die	dascz das	dzoe die
Dat.	dze dem/der	dza dem	dzem den
Gen.	doscz des/der	doscz des	doscz der

=== Indefinite articles ===
- Singular: on - "a"
- Plural: onegh - "some"

== Adjectives ==
Adjectives precede nouns:

forwotzen zona 'prohibited area'; Zekrett Politzs 'Secret Police'.

There is no sufficient evidence to tell whether adjectives change form. The rules of Dutch, a control language of Syldavian, are very complex.

Note: the derivation Klow > Klowaswa is merely one of many adjectivizations, however, compare Zyldav 'Syldavian'

Adjectives can be used to modify verbs like adverbs:

Nadja Wladimir zekrett löwt. 'Nadja secretly loves Vladimir'

Dzapeih wzryzkar eszt on vaghabontz. 'The guy is surely a tramp.'

== Pronouns ==
=== Personal pronouns ===
	Sub.	Obj.	Poss.
1 sing.	ek	ma	mejn
2 sing.	dûs	da	dejn
3 sing. m.	eih	itd	yhzer
3 sing. n.	itd	ein	zsejn
3 sing. f.	zsoe	irz	yhzer
1 plur.	vei	ohmz	ohmz
2 plur.	jei	jou	öhz
3 plur.	zsoe	khon	khon

3rd person singular neuter objective and possessive and 2nd person plural pronouns are reconstructed based on Dutch and German.

=== Demonstrative pronouns ===
czei - this
tot - that

== Verbs ==
Verbs are either weak or strong. This decides how they are conjugated.

=== Conjugation ===
Strong verb: blavn 'to stay'

	Pres. Ind.	Past Ind.	Subj.	Imp.	Pres. Part.	Past Part.
1 sing.	blav	blev	blavetz	-	blavendz	bleven
2 sing.	*blavszt	*blevszt	*blavetzt	blaveh	blavendz	bleven
3 sing.	blavet	blev	blavetz	-	blavendz	bleven
1 plur.	blaven	bleven	blavendz	-	blavendz	bleven
2 plur.	*blavet	*blevet	*blavetz	blavet	blavendz	bleven
3 plur.	blaven	bleven	blavendz		blavendz	bleven

Weak verb: löwn 'to love'

	Pres. Ind.	Past Ind.	Subj.	Imp.	Pres. Part.	Past Part.
1 sing.	löw	löwda	löwetz	-	löwendz	löwen
2 sing.	*löwszt	*löwdaszt	*löwetzt	löweh	löwendz	löwen
3 sing.	löwt	löwda	löwetz	-	löwendz	löwen
1 plur.	löwen	löwenda	löwendz	-	löwendz	löwen
2 plur.	*löwet	*löwdet	*löwetz	löwet	löwendz	löwen
3 plur.	löwen	löwenda	löwendz		löwendz	löwen

- The 2nd person conjugations are unknown, with reconstructions shown with asterisks. Corresponding German verbs and the 2 pl. imperative were used as a guideline in the reconstructions, with -szt in 2 sing. based upon German -st, although -szcz and -eh (the latter written -ещ in Cyrillic, which would be -esht in Bulgarian Cyrillic) are other possibilities.

=== Negatives ===
To negate a sentence, the particle nietz is placed after the subject, in auxiliary position.

Müsstler nietz dzem könikstz löwt. 'Müsstler does not love the king.'

In copulative sentences, nietz is placed after the verb (or czesztot) :

Müsstler eszt nietz güdd. 'Müsstler is not good.'
Czesztot wzryzkar nietz on waghabontz! 'That's surely not a vagabond!'

== Adverbs ==
Most adverbs tend to be identical to adjectives in form. Adverbs can be used to modify verbs:

Nadja Wladimir zekrett löwt. 'Nadja secretly loves Vladimir'

Dzapeih wzryzkar eszt on vaghabontz. 'The guy is surely a tramp.'

== Interjections ==
szplug - a curse word, perhaps equivalent to "damn". (Not found in original French edition, only English translation.)

szplitz on szplug- a more extreme form of szplug

hamaïh!- praising or surprise, could be something like "hail!" or "wow!"

hält!- a command, probably meaning "stop!" or "halt!"

szcht!- another command, sounds almost like "shh!" and perhaps means "silence!"

zsálu- a greeting, probably "salute" or "hello".

== Syntax ==
=== Verbs ===
The verb normally follows the object:

Ihn dzekhoujchz blaveh! 'In the car stay!'

Ek mejn mädjek löw. 'I love my girlfriend.'

On sprädj werlagh. 'I want some red wine.'

Where there's an auxiliary and a main verb, the main verb remains at the end, and the auxiliary verb moves just after the subject:

Zsoe ghounh dzoeteuïh ebb touhn.' 'They're going to open the doors.'

Ek werlagh ihn Klow blavn. 'I want to stay in Klow.'

=== Pronouns ===
In earlier Syldavian the pronoun may follow the verb, and this form may still be used for emphasis:

Eih bennec, eih blavec. 'Here I am, here I stay.' [medieval spelling]
Wzryzkar kzomme ek! 'I'm coming, for sure!'

You can say either Eihn ben ek, Eihn bennek or Ek ben eihn, but never *Eihn ek ben (unlike English, where you can say 'Here I am'). In general "X is Y" can be inverted to "Y is X". When X is a pronoun, the inversion adds some emphasis:

Güdd eszt itd, 'Good it is.'

In the kzommet sentences in the corpus, prepositional phrases follow the verb. The comma, however, is a signal that the prepositional phrase has been moved for emphasis, or because it is an afterthought:

Kzommet micz omhz, noh dascz gendarmaskaïa! Come with us to the police station!

Forms of 'be' directly follow the subject :

Könikstz eszt güdd. 'The king is good.'

Sbrodj on forwotzen eszt zona . 'Sbrodj is a forbidden zone.'

Dan dzetronn eszt ervöh. 'Then the throne is for him.'

The merged form czesztot 'it is, that is' begins a sentence: Czesztot Tintin. "That's Tintin."

== Historical changes ==
Samples of Syldavian from only two periods - the 14th century and the 20th century - are available. But even with such a small sample, some changes can be seen in the language over a 600-year period:

- pho became vüh ("for")
- cegan became czaïgan ("say")
- eih became eihn ("here")
- coe became kzou ("cow")
- ön became o ("at, about")
- wazs became vazs ("what")
- w and v transposed
- c (/k/) became k

== Sample text ==
From a 14th-century manuscript, Noble Deeds of Ottokar IV:

Medieval spelling

"Pir Ottocar, dûs pollsz ez cönicstz, dan tronn eszt pho mâ." Czeillâ czäídâ ön eltcâr alpû, "Kzommetz lapzâda pacceho." Cönicstz itd ön alpû clöppz Staszrvitchz erom szûbel ön. Dâzsbíc fällta öpp ön cârrö.

Modern spelling

"Pir Ottokar, dûs pollsz ez könikstz, dan tronn eszt vöh mâ." Czeillâ czäídâ o eltkâr alpû, "Kzommetz lapzâda pakkeho." Könikstz itd o alpû klöppz Staszrvitchz erom szûbel o. Dâzsbíck fällta öpp o kârrö.

Cyrillic spelling

"Пир Оттокар, дўс поллсз ез кёникстз, дан тронн есзт вёщ мӕ.” Чеиллӕ чяѝдӕ о елткӕр алпў, “Кзомметз лапзӕда паккещо.” Кёникстз итд о алпў клёппз Стасзрвитчз ером сзўбел о. Дӕзсбѝк фяллта ёпп о кӕррё.

English translation:

"Father Ottokar, thou falsely art king; the throne is for me." This one said thus to the other, "Come seize the sceptre." The king thus hit him, Staszrvitch, on his head. The villain fell onto the floor."

More examples

Czesztot on klebcz. - "That's a dog."

Hamaïh! - "Hail!" (The Bordurian language borrows this as Amaïh)

Kzommet micz omhz, noh dascz gendarmaskaïa. - "Come with us to the Police Station." (politzski in the English translation.) Gendarmaskaïa is a borrowing from French gendarme. The suffix -skaïa is also apparently borrowed from the Russian feminine adjective ending -ская.

On fläsz Klowaswa vüh dzapeih... Eih döszt! - "A bottle of Klow water for this guy... He's thirsty!" (cf. Dutch dorst & cf. Swedish törst, "thirst". (Lit. 'He thirsts!')

Czesztot wzryzkar nietz on waghabontz! Czesztot bätczer yhzer kzömmetz noh dascz gendarmaskaïa? - "That's surely not a tramp! Isn't it better for him to come to the police station?" (Lit. probably "Is it better [that] he comes to the police station?")

Rapp! Noh dzem buthsz! - "Quick! Into the boat!" (cognate literally to German Nach dem Boot!)

== See also ==
- Bordurian
