= Borduria =

Fictional country in The Adventures of Tintin

- The Adventures of Tintin location
- Flag

- The Balkans, general location of Syldavia and Borduria
- Created by: Hergé

In-universe information
- Other name: Republic of Borduria
- Type: Semi-totalitarian Fascist dictatorship
- Ruled by: Marshal Kûrvi-Tasch
- Ethnic groups: Bordurian (Mixed Ottoman Turkish and Southern Slavic roots)
- Locations: Szohôd (capital)
- Language(s): Bordurian
- Currency: Bordurian Dinar

Borduria is a fictional country in The Adventures of Tintin, the comics series by Belgian cartoonist Hergé. It is located in the Balkans and has a rivalry with the fictional neighbouring country of Syldavia. Borduria is depicted in King Ottokar's Sceptre (1938–1939) and The Calculus Affair (1954–1956), and is referred to in Tintin and the Picaros (1975–1976). Another international rival is Khemed.

== Appearances in Tintin books ==
In King Ottokar's Sceptre, Tintin reads a Syldavian tourist pamphlet that reveals the early history of Syldavia and its relationship with Borduria. In 1195, Syldavia was annexed by neighbouring Borduria due to the weakness of King Muskar II, and was under its rule until 1275, when Baron Almaszout drove the Bordurians away and established himself as King Ottokar I. In the later Tintin stories, this ancient rivalry continues, with the Bordurians continually trying to invade or undermine Syldavia.

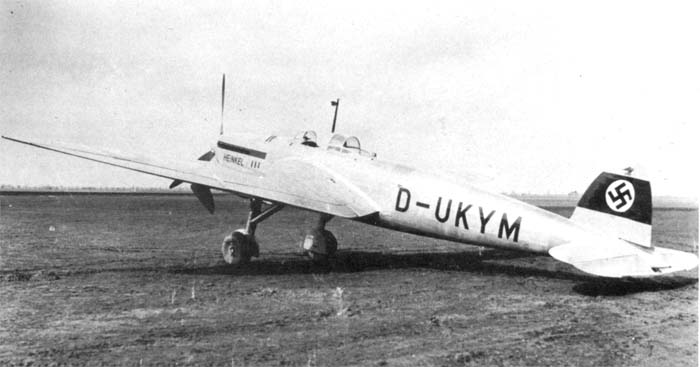
The Nazi German Heinkel He 118 used by Hergé to draw his airplane in 1939. The Swastika was replaced by another geometrical form.

King Ottokar's Sceptre (written in 1939 by Hergé) depicts an unsuccessful Bordurian attempt to stage a coup d'état against Syldavia by stealing the royal sceptre. Without the sceptre, the King will be forced to abdicate, after which the Bordurians intend to invade the country with the support from Syldavian sympathizers. Tintin recovers the sceptre and returns it. The Bordurians then withdraw their troops 15 miles from the border to prove their peaceful intentions.

In The Calculus Affair (1956), Professor Calculus is kidnapped by the Bordurians after developing an ultrasonic weapon. Borduria is depicted as a stereotypical Eastern Bloc country with its own secret police (ZEP) (led by Colonel Sponsz) and a military dictator, Marshal Kûrvi-Tasch. A statue of Kûrvi-Tasch appears in front of a government building, in which he wears a moustache similar to Joseph Stalin's and gives a Nazi-like salute. The Bordurian military of this period is depicted as technologically inept. Due to defective mines and anti-tank guns, they are unable to stop a stolen tank commandeered by Tintin and his companions, and the Professor is rescued.

In Tintin and the Picaros (1976), Bordurian military advisors, including Colonel Sponsz, arrive in the South American banana republic of San Theodoros, ruled by General Tapioca, to support an alliance between the two countries. In an unpublished page drawn by Hergé for this book, a bust of Kûrvi-Tasch can even be seen in the office of a San Theodorean colonel. Eventually, Tapioca is deposed by Tintin's friend General Alcazar, and Sponsz is repatriated to Borduria.

== Geography ==
The Bordurian countryside is set in dramatic mountainous terrain. The craggy landscape and towering peaks are most similar to the Balkan Mountains in Moesia. Therefore, it is possible that Borduria is set roughly in the present-day locations of Bulgaria and Serbia. The capital of Borduria is Szohôd, which is also the seat of government.

== Government and military ==
Old flag of Borduria (from 1939 black and white edition of King Ottokar's Sceptre)

Alternative interpretation of 1939 black and white edition

Old flag of Borduria (from 1947 color edition of King Ottokar's Sceptre)

Post-war flag of Borduria (from 1956 The Calculus Affair)

Variant of post-war flag

Borduria is a fascist country with a totalitarian government. Several Central European countries such as Hungary, Croatia, Albania and Romania were ruled by fascist governments before or during World War II. Many became client states of the Soviet Union after the war; Borduria may be presumed to be in a similar situation. In Tintin post-war stories it is not depicted as a typical Eastern Bloc country, however, but as a fascist state. The fact that the president of state bears the military rank of Marshal is a reference to Soviet leader Joseph Stalin, Romania's wartime leader Ion Antonescu and Yugoslavia's post-war president Josip Broz Tito. However, the leader's cult of personality most resembles Joseph Stalin.

The army in pre-war King Ottokar's Sceptre is depicted as German-supplied, the main aircraft depicted being the Bf 109. In post-war stories it has all the characteristics of the Soviet military. In Tintin and the Picaros the San Theodoros army is supplied by Borduria with Beretta AR70/90 assault-rifles and Mil Mi-1 helicopters. Also the government state limousine with Kurvi-Tasch's mustaches is inspired by the Soviet ZIL-114.

In King Ottokar's Sceptre, the Bordurian flag is black with a red circle and two black triangles, reminiscent of the stark, eye-catching symbols used by several Fascist movements. In The Calculus Affair, it is red, with the emblem of Kurvi-Tasch's mustache inside a white circle, resembling it closer to the Nazi flag, and this was also worn as military armbands by the Bordurian military personnel. In King Ottokar's Sceptre, the Bordurian army uses the Gewehr 98, vz. 24 and Karabiner 98k bolt-action rifles. In The Calculus Affair, Bordurian soldiers and agents were armed with Italian Beretta Model 38 Submachine Guns. Due to the nature of its government and its military's weaponry, Borduria was most likely an affiliate of the Axis during World War II, although there is no explicit mention of that in the books.

The post-war emblem of Borduria is similar to the circumflex symbol, and is modelled in the likeness of the mustache of Marshal Kûrvi-Tasch. In The Calculus Affair, evidence of the cult of personality surrounding the Marshal can be found in countless objects in Borduria, from the lettering on signs and buildings to the logos of Bordurian companies and even certain characteristics and details on cars, including the car bumpers, include the shape in their designs.

== Language ==
The Tintin books depict the country's language, Bordurian, only in fragments. Like Syldavian, the language seems to be based on the Dutch Brussels dialect Marols, such as mänhir for "mister" or "sir" (cf. Dutch mijnheer). Unlike Syldavian, it uses the Latin alphabet exclusively, and makes heavy use of the digraph sz (possibly borrowed from Hungarian), as well as ô.
