= Flight 714 to Sydney =

Comic album by Belgian cartoonist Hergé

Flight 714 to Sydney (Vol 714 pour Sydney)
- Cover of the retitled English edition
- Date: 1968
- Series: The Adventures of Tintin
- Publisher: Casterman

Creative team
- Creator: Hergé

Original publication
- Published in: Tintin magazine
- Issues: 936 – 997
- Date of publication: 27 September 1966 – 28 November 1967
- Language: French

Translation
- Publisher: Methuen
- Date: 1968
- Translator: Leslie Lonsdale-Cooper; Michael Turner

Chronology
- Preceded by: The Castafiore Emerald (1963)
- Followed by: Tintin and the Picaros (1976)

Flight 714 to Sydney (French: Vol 714 pour Sydney; originally published in English as Flight 714) is the twenty-second volume of The Adventures of Tintin, the comics series by Belgian cartoonist Hergé. It was serialised weekly from September 1966 to November 1967 in Tintin magazine. The title refers to a flight that Tintin and his friends fail to catch, as they become embroiled in their arch-nemesis Rastapopoulos' plot to kidnap an eccentric millionaire from a supersonic business jet on a Sondonesian island.

Hergé started work on Flight 714 to Sydney four years after the completion of his previous Adventure, The Castafiore Emerald. At this point in his life, he was increasingly uninterested in continuing the series, and used the story to explore the paranormal phenomena that deeply fascinated him. After its serialisation in Tintin magazine, the story was collected for publication in book form by Casterman in 1968. Although noted for its highly detailed artwork, critical reception of Flight 714 to Sydney has been mixed to negative, with its narrative being criticised by commentators for the farcical portrayal of its antagonists, the nescience of its protagonists, and for leaving its central mystery unresolved. Hergé continued The Adventures of Tintin with Tintin and the Picaros, while the series itself became a defining part of the Franco-Belgian comics tradition. The story was adapted for the 1991 animated Ellipse/Nelvana series The Adventures of Tintin.

== Synopsis ==
During a refueling stop at Kemajoran Airport, Jakarta en route to an international space exploration conference in Sydney, Australia (as guests of honour for being the first men on the Moon), Tintin, his dog Snowy, and their friends Captain Haddock and Professor Calculus chance upon their old acquaintance Skut (introduced in The Red Sea Sharks). Skut is now the personal pilot for aircraft industrialist and eccentric millionaire Laszlo Carreidas, who is also attending the conference. Tintin and his friends join Carreidas on his prototype private jet, the Carreidas 160, crewed by Skut, co-pilot Hans Boehm, navigator Paolo Colombani, and steward Gino. Carreidas' secretary Spalding, Boehm, and Colombani hijack the plane and bring it to the (fictional) volcanic island of Pulau-pulau Bompa, situated in the Celebes Sea, where the aircraft makes a rough landing on a makeshift runway. While disembarking from the plane, Snowy bolts from Tintin's arms and runs off into the jungle under gunfire. The mastermind of the plot then reveals himself as Rastapopoulos, intent on seizing Carreidas' fortune. Captain Haddock's corrupt ex-shipmate, Allan, is present as Rastapopoulos's henchman, and Sondonesian nationalists have been hired as mercenaries.

Tintin, Haddock, Calculus, Skut and Gino are bound and held in a Japanese World War II-era bunker, while Rastapopoulos takes Carreidas to another bunker where his accomplice, Dr. Krollspell, injects him with a truth serum to reveal Carreidas's Swiss bank account number. Under the serum's influence, Carreidas becomes eager to confide his life of greed, perfidy, and theft, revealing every detail thereof except the actual account number. Furious, Rastapopoulos strikes at Krollspell, who is still holding the truth serum syringe, and is accidentally injected, whereupon he too boasts of past crimes until he and Carreidas quarrel over which of them is the most evil. In the process, Rastapopoulos reveals that nearly all of the men he recruited, including Spalding, the aircraft pilots, the Sondonesians and Krollspell himself, are marked to be eliminated after he gets the account number.

Snowy helps Tintin and his friends escape, and they find the bunker where Carreidas is held prisoner. Tintin and Haddock bind and gag Rastapopoulos, Krollspell and Carreidas, and escort them to lower ground, intending to use Rastapopoulos as a hostage. The serum's effect wears off, and Rastapopoulos escapes; Krollspell, eager to stay alive, continues to accompany Tintin and Haddock. After a run-in with Allan, the pilots, and the Sondonesians, Tintin, led by a telepathic voice, guides the other protagonists to a cave, where they discover a temple hidden inside the island's volcano, guarded by an ancient statue resembling a modern astronaut. Inside the structure, Tintin and his friends reunite with Calculus and meet the scientist Mik Kanrokitoff, whose guiding voice they have followed via a telepathic transmitter obtained from an extraterrestrial race that was formerly worshipped on the island as gods and are now working with Kanrokitoff to communicate with Earth's scientists. An altercation breaks out between Calculus and Carreidas as Krollspell, Mik Kanrokitoff, Haddock and Tintin try to calm them down. Tintin, Haddock, Snowy, Calculus, Krollspell, Mik Kanrokitoff and Carreidas are reunited with Skut and Gino. An earthquake and explosion set off by Rastapopoulos and his men triggers a volcanic eruption; Tintin and his party reach relative safety in the volcano's crater. Rastapopoulos and his henchmen flee the eruption outside the volcano and launch a rubber dinghy from Carreidas' plane.

Kanrokitoff puts Tintin and his compatriots under hypnosis and summons a flying saucer piloted by the extraterrestrials, which they board to escape the eruption. Kanrokitoff spots the rubber dinghy and exchanges Tintin and his companions (except Krollspell, who is returned to his clinic) for Allan, Spalding, Rastapopoulos, and the treacherous pilots, who are whisked away in the saucer to an unknown fate. Tintin, Haddock, Calculus, Skut, Gino and Carreidas awaken from hypnosis and cannot remember what happened to them; Calculus retains a crafted rod of alloyed cobalt, iron, and nickel, which he had found in the caves. The cobalt is of a state that does not occur on Earth, and is the only evidence of an encounter with its makers. Only Snowy, who cannot speak, remembers the hijacking and alien abduction. After being rescued by a scouting plane, Tintin, Haddock, Skut, Calculus and Carreidas are interviewed about what they can recall of their ordeal; meanwhile in Europe, Jolyon Wagg and his family members watch their interviews on television. Afterwards, Tintin, his companions, and Carreidas catch Qantas Flight 714 flight to Sydney.

== History ==
Hergé began writing Flight 714 to Sydney four years after he had ended The Castafiore Emerald. His enthusiasm for The Adventures of Tintin had declined, and instead his main interest was abstract art, both as a painter and a collector. He initially planned on titling his new story Special Flight for Adelaide before changing it to Flight 714 to Sydney. While working on the story, Hergé told English translator Michael Turner that "I've fallen out of love with Tintin. I just can't bear to see him".

With Flight 714 to Sydney, Hergé stated that he wanted a "return to Adventure with a capital A ... without really returning there". He sought to provide answers to two questions: "Are there other inhabited planets? And are there 'insiders' who know it?" Hergé had a longstanding interest in paranormal phenomena, and believed that a story with such elements would appeal to the growing interest in the subject. He was particularly influenced by Robert Charroux's Le Livre des Secrets Trahis ("The Book of Betrayed Secrets"), which expounded the idea that extraterrestrials had influenced humanity during prehistory. The character of Mik Ezdanitoff (Mik Kanrokitoff in the English translation) was based on Jacques Bergier, a writer on paranormal topics; Bergier was pleased with this. The name "Ezdanitoff" is a pun on "Iz da nie tof", a Marols (Brussels dialect) phrase which means "Isn't that great". The television presenter who interviews the protagonists at the end of the story was visually modelled on the Tintin fan Jean Tauré, who had written to Hergé asking if he could be depicted in the series shaking Haddock's hand.

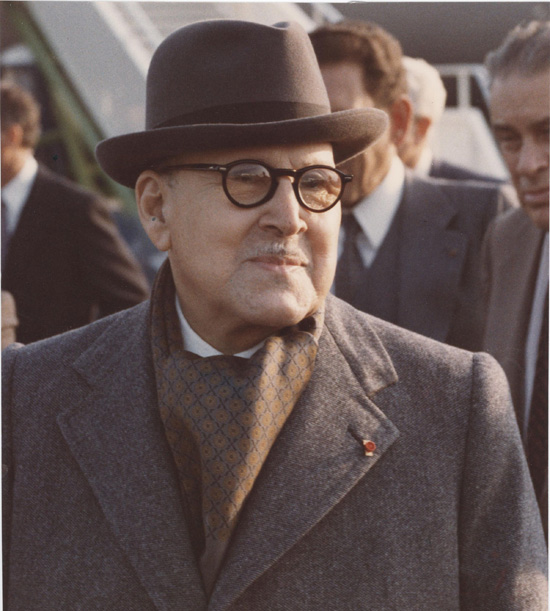
The character of Laszlo Carreidas, devised for this story, was based on Marcel Dassault.

Rastapopoulos, a recurring villain in the series who had last appeared in The Red Sea Sharks, made a return in Flight 714 to Sydney. In his interviews with Numa Sadoul, Hergé noted that he was consciously shifting the nature of the villains in the book, relating that "during the story, I realised that when all was said and done Rastapopoulos and Allan were pathetic figures. Yes, I discovered this after giving Rastapopoulos the attire of a de luxe cowboy; he appeared to me to be so grotesque dressed up in this manner that he ceased to impress me. The villains were debunked: in the end they seem above all ridiculous and wretched. You see, that's how things evolve". Other characters that Hergé brought back for the story were Skut, the Estonian pilot from The Red Sea Sharks, and Jolyon Wagg, who is depicted watching television at the very end of the story.

Hergé also introduced new characters into the story, such as Laszlo Carreidas, who was based on the French aerospace magnate Marcel Dassault. In his interview with Sadoul, Hergé also observed that "[w]ith Carreidas, I departed from the concept of good and bad. Carreidas is one of the goodies of the story. It does not matter that he is not an attractive personality. He is a cheat by nature. Look at the discussion between him and Rastapopoulos when, under the influence of the truth serum, they both boast of their worst misdeeds[…] A good example for small children: the rich and respected man, who gives a lot to charity, and the bandit in the same boat! That's not very moral". Hergé also created a secretary for Carreidas in the form of Spalding, whom Hergé remarked off in an interview with The Sunday Times in 1968 as "an English public school man, obviously the black sheep of his family". Another character he invented for the story was Dr. Krollspell, whom he later related had "probably 'worked' in a Nazi camp". He was thus implied to be a former doctor in one of the Nazi extermination camps — perhaps based partly on Josef Mengele — who had fled Europe after the Second World War and settled in New Delhi, where he established his medical clinic.

Although Hergé drew the basis of Flight 714 to Sydney, his assistants at Studios Hergé, led by Bob de Moor, were largely responsible for the story's final look, which included drawing all of the background details and selecting colours. To depict the erupting volcano, Hergé utilised photographs of eruptions at Etna and Kilauea that were in his image collection. He also turned to this collection for a photograph of a flying saucer that he used as the basis for the extraterrestrial spacecraft depicted in the story. Later, Hergé regretted explicitly depicting the alien spacecraft at the end of the story, although he was unsure how he could have ended the story without it.

=== Carreidas 160 ===
The Carreidas 160 cross-sectional view, as it appeared in Tintin magazine

Hergé wanted the Carreidas 160 supersonic business jet in Flight 714 to Sydney to have at least the same detailed attention that he had put into all of his fictional vehicles, from the Unicorn ship in The Secret of the Unicorn (1943) to the Moon rocket in Explorers on the Moon (1954). The faster-than-sound jet aircraft called for by the new Tintin adventure, while fanciful, could not be viewed as implausible and needed to meet the same exacting standards. Hergé, who had reached his sixtieth birthday and whose drawing hand had begun suffering from eczema, left the design and drawing of the jet to Roger Leloup, his younger colleague at Studios Hergé. Leloup, a technical artist and aviation expert, had drawn the Moon rocket, the de Havilland Mosquito in The Red Sea Sharks (1958), and all aircraft in the recently redrawn The Black Island (1966). Leloup was described by British Tintin expert Michael Farr as "the aeronautical expert in the Studios" and his design of the Carreidas 160 as "painstakingly executed and, of course, viable".

A "meticulous design of the revolutionary Carreidas 160 jet" was prepared, according to entertainment producer and author Harry Thompson, "a fully working aircraft with technical plans drawn up by Roger Leloup". Leloup's detailed cross-sectional design of the Carreidas 160 and its technical specifications were published in a double-page spread for Tintin magazine in 1966.

=== Publication ===
Flight 714 to Sydney was serialised in Belgium and France in Le Journal de Tintin from September 1966. The series was serialised at a rate of one page a week in the magazine. It was then published in collected form by Casterman in 1968. For this collected version, Hergé had to cut the number of final frames due to a mistake in numbering the pages. Hergé designed the cover for the volume, which Casterman initially thought was too subdued, so he brightened the colours and enlarged the central figures. A launch party for the publication of the book was held in Paris in May 1968, but was overshadowed by that month's student demonstrations and civil unrest.

When originally published in English by Methuen that same year, the volume was presented under the shortened title of Flight 714; since the series' republication by Egmont Publishing, it has been referred to as Flight 714 to Sydney, corresponding to the original French title. Among the alterations made to the story by translators Leslie-Lonsdale Cooper and Michael Turner were shifting Carreidas' birth from 1899 to 1906, and changing the location of Krollspell's medical clinic from New Delhi to Cairo.

== Critical analysis ==
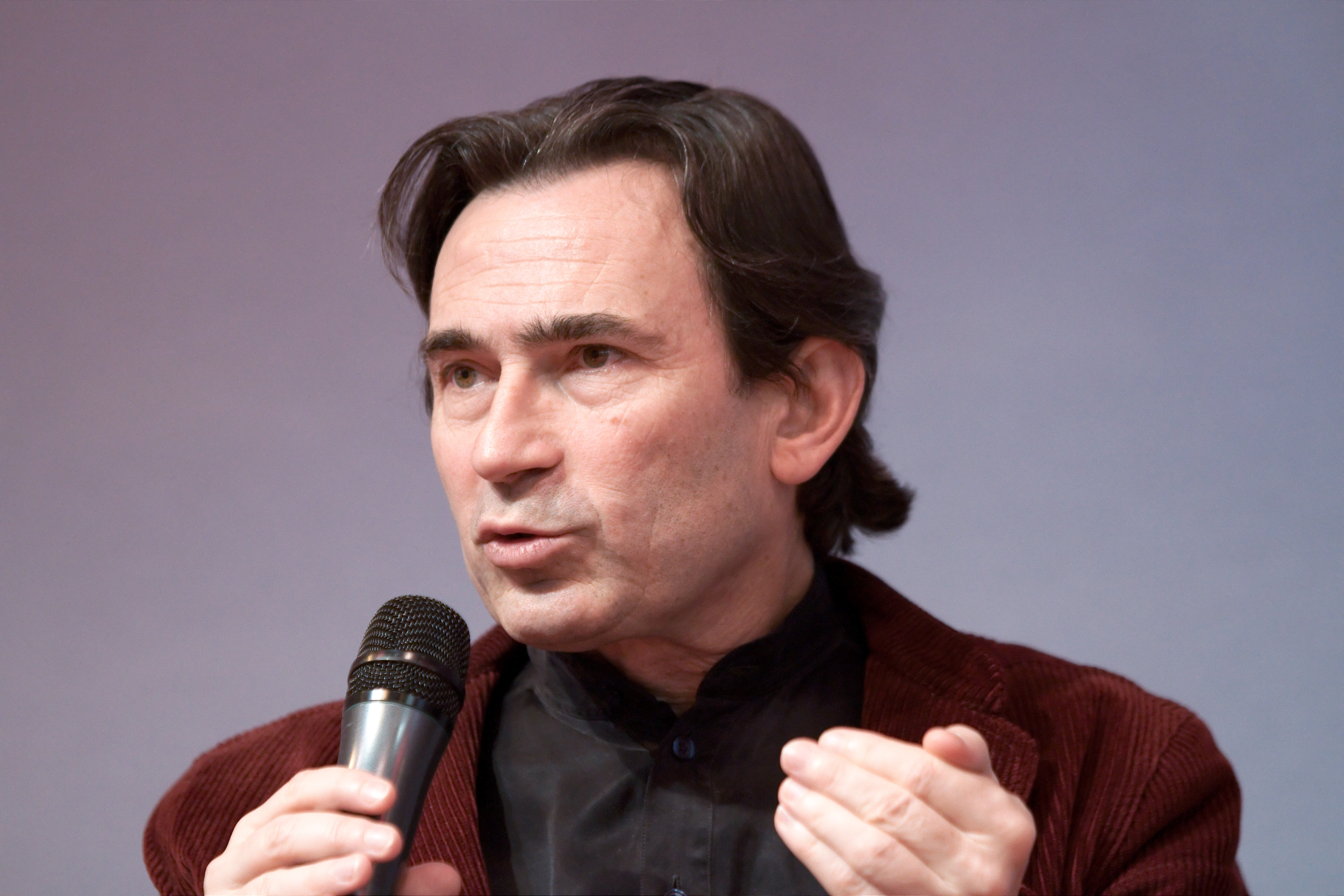
Hergé biographer Benoît Peeters felt that the villains in Flight 714 to Sydney were "objects of parody".

Hergé biographer Benoît Peeters noted that Flight 714 to Sydney "continues the debunking process" of the most recent books, with the villains becoming "objects of parody". He suggested that the character of Carreidas was "one of the most marked features" of the book, for he represented "a more ambiguous character than Hergé's earlier creations". He thought that in doing so, Hergé was "trying to make his world more subtle by eliminating the certainties on which it had been built" and in doing so was "attacking the very foundations he had created", and that this "self-destructive tendency" became more fully "explicit" in the subsequent instalment, Tintin and the Picaros. Peeters noted that the book "smacks somewhat of [Hergé's] hesitation" as he was unsure whether to include an explicit depiction of the extraterrestrial ship. Peeters also thought that the final scene in the book, featuring Wagg and his family, was "tailored to perfection".

Jean-Marc Lofficier and Randy Lofficier felt that the volume "totally demystifies" Rastapopolous, who has been transformed from a "criminal mastermind" into "a farcical villain" akin to a character from the Pink Panther films. They also noted that Allan had similarly changed from a "cunning, brutal henchman" into a "low-brow, buffoonish thug". They also noted that Carreidas was "a villain to rival Rastapopolous". Lofficier and Lofficier saw the "memory erasure" twist at the end of the story as being "lame", arguing that it would have been interesting to see Tintin interact with extraterrestrials. Thus, they thought that this tactic displayed "Hergé's lack of confidence in his storytelling abilities". They awarded it three stars out of five, characterising it as "a disappointing book in spite of its high promise".

Michael Farr suggested that Flight 714 to Sydney represented the "most far-fetched adventure" in the series. He suggested that the narrative got off to a "promising start" but that it "degenerates" as it progresses. He also criticised the artwork, suggesting that as a result of its reliance on the artists of Studios Hergé, it contained "excesses" not present in earlier volumes. Farr thought that the addition of extraterrestrials was "esoteric and speculative enough to weaken and trivialise the whole adventure".

Harry Thompson praised Flight 714 to Sydney, believing that with it, Hergé was at the "top of his form". Thompson thought that "artistically, the book is his greatest achievement", demonstrating a "cinematic ingenuity of his composition", particularly in its scenes inside the temple and of the volcanic eruption. He also noted that the scene of the extraterrestrial spacecraft bore similarities with the depiction of the alien ship in the 1977 film Close Encounters of the Third Kind, highlighting that the film's director, Steven Spielberg, was a known fan of The Adventures of Tintin. Thompson also highlighted the "parallel with big business and crime" that was used in the story, noting that this theme had earlier been present in Tintin in America.

The literary critic Tom McCarthy believed that Flight 714 to Sydney exhibited a number of themes that recurred throughout the Adventures of Tintin more widely. He opined that the troubles faced by Tintin and Haddock aboard Carreidas' jet reflected the theme of the "troubled host–guest relationship". He believed that Rastapopoulos' activities below the area that he could be located by radar reflected the theme of eluding detection. In addition, he expressed the view that the flagging relationship of Haddock and Calculus, as it is depicted in Flight 714 to Sydney, is a form of the wider theme of strained relationships in the series. McCarthy also highlighted the scene at the start the story in which Haddock mistakes Carreidas for someone trapped in poverty and gives him some money accordingly; McCarthy drew parallels between this scene and a similar one from Charles Baudelaire's poem "La Fausse Monnaie", suggesting that Hergé might have been thinking of Baudelaire's scene when creating his own.

Flight 714 may seem like a totally pointless adventure because the characters do not remember anything that happens and their stay on the island does not change them in any way. While showing us something of their daily lives and desire for roots, this adventure otherwise alienates the characters from their readers and encloses them in a fictional universe.

— Jean-Marie Apostolidès

In his psychoanalytical study of The Adventures of Tintin, the literary critic Jean-Marie Apostolidès expressed the view that the philosophical concept of "the void" appeared repeatedly in Flight 714 to Sydney, referring to the existence of World War II bunkers and the underground temple as examples. He added that whereas early Adventures of Tintin reflected a keen division between "Good and Evil", in this story this dichotomy has been replaced by a "meaningless void", with Rastapopoulos having degenerated from the role of criminal mastermind to that of "a mere hoodlum" who "sinks to the level of mere farce". Apostolidès further expresses the view that one of the "best scenes" in the story was that involving an interchange between Rastapopoulos and Carreidas, stating that "their opposition is merely superficial", in this way comparing them to the competing figures of General Alcazar and General Tapioca in Tintin and the Picaros.

Apostolidès believed that Flight 714 to Sydney exhibited many of the same themes as were present in Prisoners of the Sun and the Destination Moon/Explorers on the Moon story arc. He compares the character of Carreidas with that of Baxter from the moon adventure, yet notes that the former is "craftier, more childish and inhumane, less interested in research itself than in technological applications", working for profit rather than the good of humanity. Turning his attention to comparisons with Prisoners of the Sun, he highlights that both stories feature ancient temples, "weird animals", and dramatic natural phenomena, as well as the prominent inclusion of amnesia.

== Adaptations ==
In 1991, a collaboration between the French studio Ellipse and the Canadian animation company Nelvana adapted 21 of the stories into a series of episodes, each 42 minutes long. Flight 714 was the twentieth story of The Adventures of Tintin to be adapted. Directed by Stéphane Bernasconi, the series has been praised for being "generally faithful", with compositions having been actually directly taken from the panels in the original comic book.
