= The Calculus Affair =

Comic album by Belgian cartoonist Hergé

The Calculus Affair (L'Affaire Tournesol)
- Cover of the English edition
- Date: 1956
- Series: The Adventures of Tintin
- Publisher: Casterman

Creative team
- Creator: Hergé

Original publication
- Published in: Tintin magazine
- Date of publication: 22 December 1954 – 22 February 1956
- Language: French

Translation
- Publisher: Methuen
- Date: 1960
- Translator: Leslie Lonsdale-Cooper; Michael Turner

Chronology
- Preceded by: Explorers on the Moon (1954)
- Followed by: The Red Sea Sharks (1958)

The Calculus Affair (French: L'Affaire Tournesol) is the eighteenth volume of The Adventures of Tintin, the comics series by the Belgian cartoonist Hergé. It was serialised weekly in Belgium's Tintin magazine from December 1954 to February 1956 before being published in a single volume by Casterman in 1956. The story follows the attempts of the young reporter Tintin, his dog Snowy, and his friend Captain Haddock to rescue their friend Professor Calculus, who has developed a machine capable of destroying objects with sound waves, from kidnapping attempts by the competing European countries of Borduria and Syldavia.

Like the previous volume, Explorers on the Moon, The Calculus Affair was created with the aid of Hergé's team of artists at Studios Hergé. The story reflected the Cold War tensions that Europe was experiencing during the 1950s, and introduced three recurring characters into the series: Jolyon Wagg, Cutts the Butcher, and Colonel Sponsz. Hergé continued The Adventures of Tintin with The Red Sea Sharks, and the series as a whole became a defining part of the Franco-Belgian comics tradition. The Calculus Affair was critically well-received, with various commentators having described it as one of the best Tintin adventures. The story was adapted for both the 1957 Belvision animated series Hergé's Adventures of Tintin, the 1991 Ellipse/Nelvana animated series The Adventures of Tintin, and the 1992–93 BBC Radio 5 dramatisation of the Adventures.

== Synopsis ==
During a thunderstorm, glass and porcelain items at Marlinspike Hall shatter inexplicably. Insurance salesman Jolyon Wagg arrives at the house to take shelter, annoying Captain Haddock. Gunshots are heard in the Hall's grounds, and Tintin and Haddock discover an unconscious man with a foreign accent who soon disappears with an accomplice. The next morning, Professor Calculus leaves for Geneva to attend a conference on nuclear physics. Tintin and Haddock use the opportunity to investigate Calculus' laboratory, discovering that his experiments were responsible for the glass-shattering of the previous night. While exploring, they are attacked by a masked stranger, who then takes off. While escaping, Snowy rips the stranger's coat, causing a cigarette packet to fall off. On the packet, the name of "Hotel Cornavin, Geneva" where Calculus stays was written on it. Tintin fears that Calculus is in danger. Tintin, Haddock, and Snowy head for Geneva. In Geneva, they learn that Calculus has gone to Nyon to meet Professor Topolino, an expert in ultrasonics. After missing their train journey, the group travel there in a taxi instead, but their car is attacked by two men in another car, who force the taxi into Lake Geneva. Surviving the attack, Tintin, Haddock and Snowy continue to Nyon, where they find Topolino bound and gagged in his cellar. As Tintin questions the professor, the house blows up, but they all survive.

Tintin and Haddock meet the detectives Thomson and Thompson, who reveal that the man at Marlinspike was Syldavian. Tintin surmises that Calculus had invented an ultrasonic device capable of being used as a weapon of mass destruction, which Bordurian and Syldavian intelligence agents are now seeking to obtain. Suspecting that Bordurian spies have kidnapped Calculus and are holding him hostage in their Rolle embassy, Tintin and Haddock seek to rescue him. During the attempt, a scuffle breaks out between Syldavian and Bordurian agents, in which Tintin is knocked down, and Calculus is captured by the Syldavian agents, who are able to escape by plane to their home country. The next morning, Tintin and Haddock learn that Bordurian fighter aircraft forced down the Syldavian plane and recaptured Calculus, who is now being held in Borduria. They travel to Borduria's capital, Szohôd, intent on rescuing him.

In the city, they are escorted to their hotel by agents of the Bordurian secret police, who have been ordered by police chief Colonel Sponsz to monitor the duo. Aware that they are being monitored, Tintin and Haddock escape the hotel and hide in the opera house, where Bianca Castafiore is performing. When police come searching for them, they hide in Castafiore's closet. When Sponsz comes to visit Castafiore in her dressing room, Tintin is able to steal papers from his overcoat pocket that will secure Calculus' release from the fortress of Bakhine. After disguising themselves as officials from the International Red Cross, Tintin and Haddock are able to get Calculus released from prison. During their escape, they drive off the road, but are able to hijack a tank and narrowly escape across the border.

At the lost property office, a relieved Calculus finally collects the black umbrella by Snowy alongside Tintin and Haddock. Back at Marlinspike Hall, Wagg moves his family in. Meanwhile, Calculus reveals that he forgot to take his plans for the ultrasonic device with him to Geneva, and that he had left them at home all along; he announces his intention to destroy the plans so they cannot be used to create a weapon. Haddock lights his pipe with the intention of smoking it, but Calculus uses it to burn the plans. Haddock's fit of rage over the plans literally burning up in his face leaves the hard-of-hearing Calculus believing that Haddock has chickenpox; Calculus relays this to Wagg, who moves his family out of Marlinspike Hall to avoid a contagious disease.

== History ==
=== Background ===
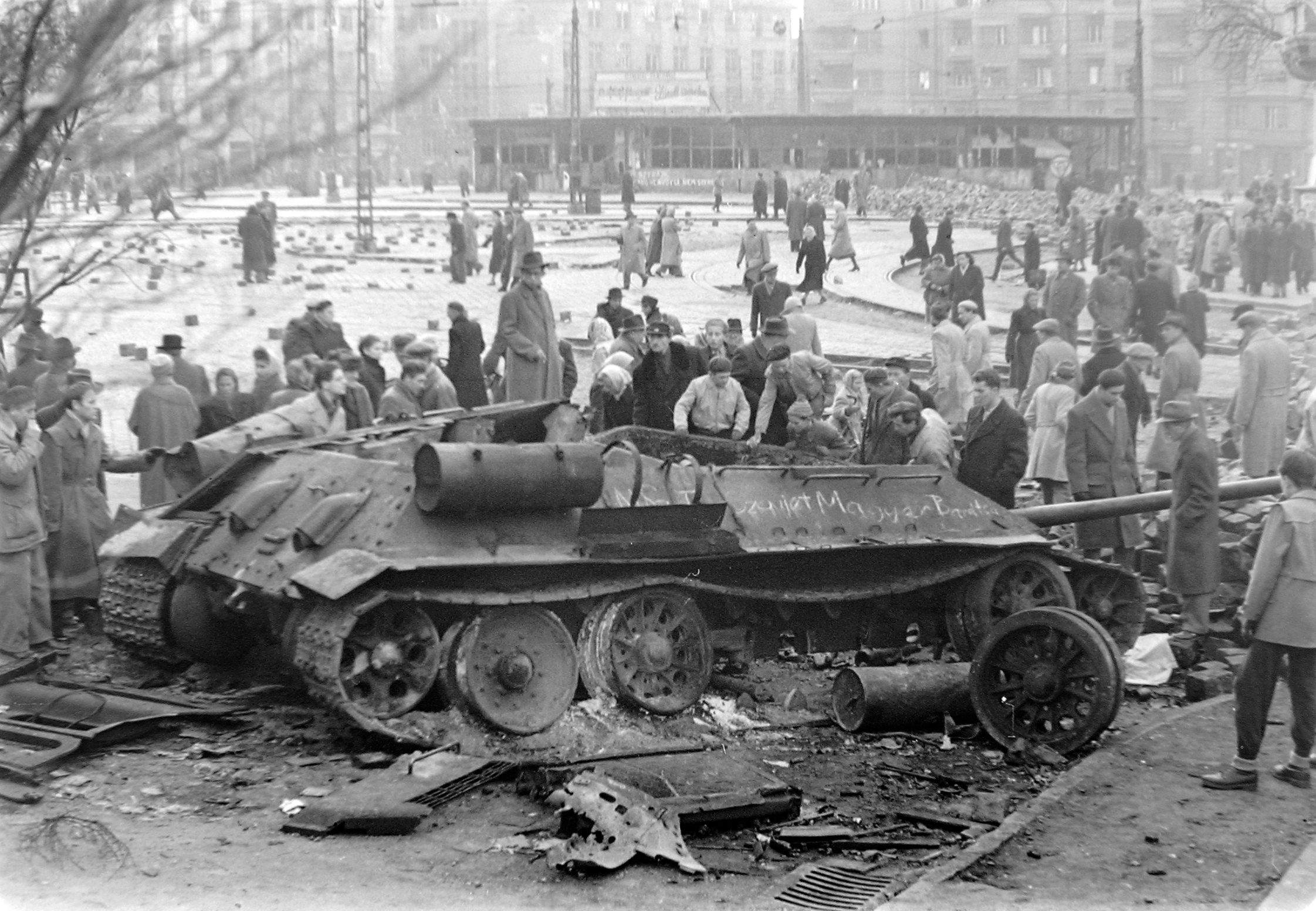
A Soviet tank destroyed in the Hungarian Revolution of 1956, one of the pivotal moments of the Cold War

Reflecting Cold War tensions, The Calculus Affair was published at a time when espionage thrillers were popular in France and Belgium. The Calculus Affair marked a return to the single-volume format which was to persist for the rest of The Adventures of Tintin. The volume started its publication in Tintin magazine in December 1954. Before working on the book, Hergé would make sketches in pencil; subsequently he would work over the drawings and text in ink. With the development of his own Studios Hergé, he selected the best sketch from a number of versions and traced it onto the page he was creating.

In The Calculus Affair Hergé introduced Jolyon Wagg, a Belgian insurance salesman, who appeared in each subsequent adventure with the exception of Tintin in Tibet. Wagg was intended as "the proverbial bore", who provides comic relief by repeatedly annoying Captain Haddock and inviting himself to Marlinspike. For the name, Séraphin Lampion in the original French version, Hergé initially chose Crampon, which was derived from the French expression "Quel crampon!" (English: "What a leech!"), but ultimately preferred the less explicit and harsh-sounding Lampion. Lampion's insurance company was Assurances Mondass, which in the English translation became the Rock Bottom Insurance Company.

Also introduced in this volume were Cutts the butcher (originally Sanzot from the French sans os; "without bones") and the Bordurian chief of secret police Colonel Sponsz, whose name is derived from the Brussels dialect term for a sponge (éponge in French). Hergé used his brother, Paul Remi, as the model for Sponsz, although he was also influenced by the image of the Austrian American filmmaker Erich von Stroheim.

=== Influences ===
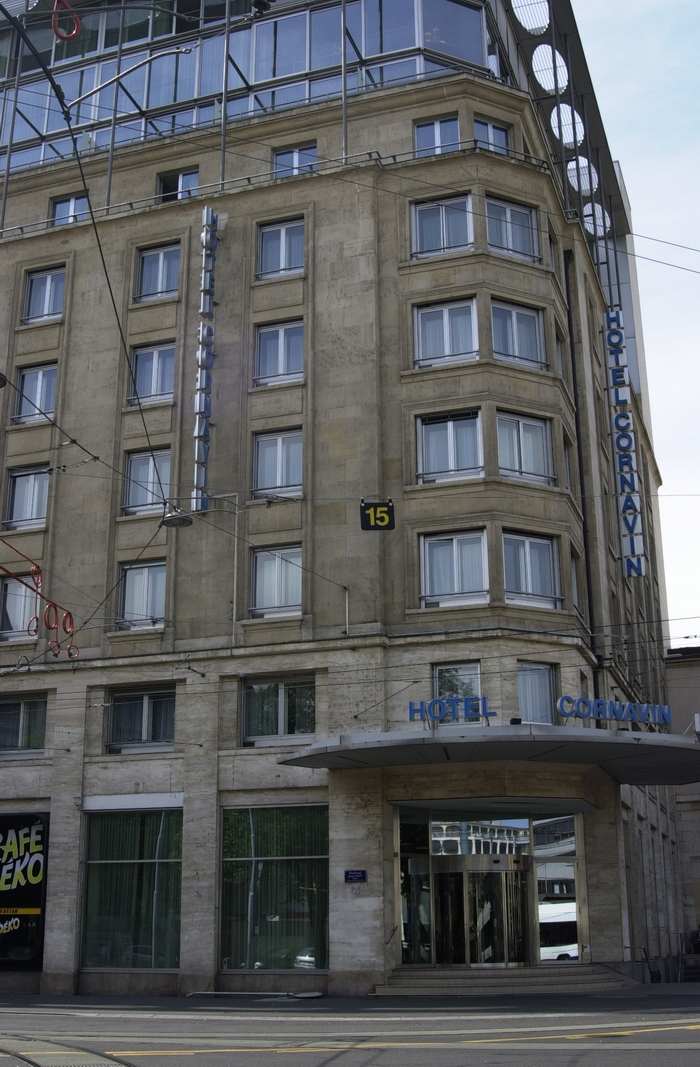
The Cornavin Hotel, where Calculus stays before leaving to meet Professor Topolino

A key influence on the plot of The Calculus Affair was an article that Hergé had read in a February 1954 issue of the Belgian weekly La Face à Main, reporting that there had been a number of incidents along the road from Portsmouth to London in southern England in which motorists' car windscreens had spontaneously shattered; the article's author suggested that it may have been caused by experiments undertaken in a nearby secret facility. To develop this plot further, Hergé consulted Professor Armand Delsemme, an astrophysicist at Liège.

Hergé's depiction of Switzerland avoided repeating national clichés, instead seeking a high level of realism. Hergé requested that Jean Dupont, the editor of L'Écho illustré – the magazine in which The Adventures of Tintin was serialised in Switzerland – send him documentation on Swiss railways from which he could draw. He also requested that his Swiss friend Charly Fornora send him a bottle of Valais wine, which he could again use as a model from which to draw. Hergé subsequently travelled to Switzerland in person to produce accurate sketches of scenes around Geneva, which he could then incorporate into the story; these included at Geneva Cointrin International Airport, Genève-Cornavin railway station, and the Cornavin Hotel, (Note: The room at the Cornavin Hotel in which Calculus stays (Room 122, fourth floor) did not exist. The hotel management later sent Hergé a letter explaining that it was not possible to stay in the Professor's room. In response to the number of letters received addressed to Professor Calculus, the hotel management later put up a plaque for room 122.) as well as the road through Cervens and Topolino's house in Nyon. Despite this realism, a number of minor errors were made in Hergé's depiction of Geneva.

The fictional flag created for Kûrvi-Tasch dictatorship

Hergé's depiction of Borduria was based on Eastern Bloc countries. Their police force was modelled on the Soviet KGB. Hergé named the political leader of Borduria Plekszy-Gladz, a pun on Plexiglas, although the English translators renamed him Kûrvi-Tasch ("curvy tash"), a reference to the fact that the leader's curved moustache, inspired by that of Soviet leader Joseph Stalin, was a prominent symbol in Borduria. All of the furniture in the Bordurian police headquarters was drawn from that found in the Studios Hergé premises.

The idea of a sonic weapon was one that had been unsuccessfully pioneered by German scientists under the control of Albert Speer during World War II. A book that Tintin examines in Professor Topolino's house, German Research in World War II by Leslie E. Simon – a retired major general in the United States Army – really existed and was published in 1947. In the strip, Hergé preserved the English-language title of the book rather than translating it into French, although altered the book's cover design to remove a prominent swastika. The inclusion of the book is one of the few instances that there is any reference to the Second World War within The Adventures of Tintin. The photograph of the sonic weapon is also authentic.

Hergé's decision to name a character Topolino was a reference to Walt Disney, whose character of Mickey Mouse was known as Topolino in Italian. Hergé included a reference to his friend and colleague, the former opera singer Edgar P. Jacobs, in the story, adding a figure named Jacobini to the billing on the opera performance alongside Castafiore. He also inserted a cameo of himself as a reporter.

=== Publication ===
The Calculus Affair began serialisation in Tintin magazine's Christmas edition on 22 December 1954, and continued to appear in the pages of that publication until 22 February 1956. It would be the first of The Adventures of Tintin to be serialised without interruption since Red Rackham's Treasure (1944). Serialisation began in the French edition of Tintin in February 1955. It was subsequently published in single form as L'Affaire Tournesol by Casterman in 1956. For this volume Hergé had designed a front cover; initially, it simply showed Tintin and Haddock hiding Calculus from Bordurian soldiers, but he subsequently added shattered yellow glass around the edges of the image for dramatic effect.

== Critical analysis ==
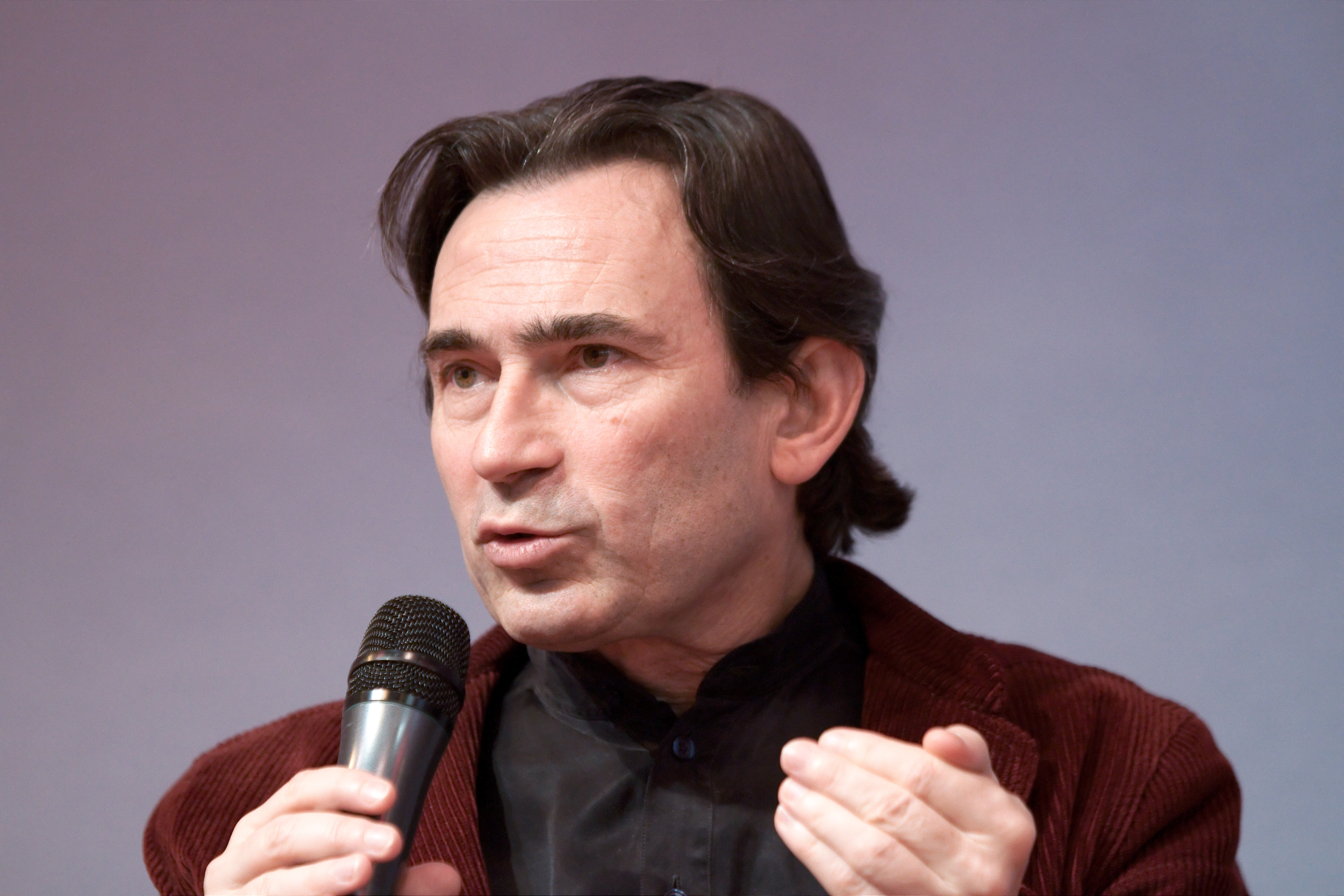
Hergé biographer Benoît Peeters described The Calculus Affair as "Hergé's masterwork".

Harry Thompson opined that while the story's ending was somewhat unsatisfactory and rushed, it remained "probably the best of all the Tintin books". Biographer Benoît Peeters agreed, describing it as "Hergé's masterwork", "a masterpiece of the classic strip cartoon". Elsewhere, he referred to it as "one of his most brilliant books", describing Wagg as "the last great figure of The Adventures of Tintin". Peeters added that the story had "the atmosphere of a spy novel worthy of John Buchan or Eric Ambler". Similarly, Farr described The Calculus Affair as "one of Hergé's finest creations". Biographer Pierre Assouline stated that the "illustrations and the scenario are vibrant and rich; the story thread holds from beginning to end".

Jean-Marc Lofficier and Randy Lofficier stated that the introduction of Wagg and Cutts the butcher represented "yet another turning point in the series", praising the characterisation of Wagg as "bitter and successful social satire". They were critical of Syldavia's inclusion as an antagonist in the story, stating that the Syldavian attempts to kidnap Calculus "strains believability" because they had appeared as allies of Calculus and Tintin in both the preceding two-volume story arc, Destination Moon (1953) and Explorers on the Moon (1954), and in the earlier King Ottokar's Sceptre (1939). The Lofficiers felt that "the plot seems somewhat shoe-horned into the familiar universe" and "one feels that Hergé's heart was not really much into the action part of the story", ultimately awarding it three stars out of five.

In his psychoanalytical study of The Adventures of Tintin, the literary critic Jean-Marie Apostolidès declared that The Calculus Affair marked the beginning of the third and final period of the series, which he believed could be characterised by Hergé's depiction of a world run by "wheeling and dealing" and in which "detective work takes precedence over any mystical quest". Apostolidès considered The Calculus Affair to be both Calculus' "triumph and his defeat". He felt that while Calculus had become "an impartial figure" in the preceding two-volume story arc, Destination Moon and Explorers on the Moon, here he had become "the Bad Mother" through his creation of an ultrasonic weapon and the threat that he poses both to the tranquility of Marlinspike and to world peace. He viewed the scene at the end of the story in which Calculus burns the plans to his ultrasonic device as "a symbolic castration", allowing the character to become "the Oedipal Father with whom the sons [Tintin and Haddock] can compete", thus stabilising "the family hierarchy" of the series.

Literary critic Tom McCarthy believed that The Calculus Affair aptly illustrated how Tintin was no longer political in the manner that he was in earlier works like Tintin in the Land of the Soviets (1930) and Tintin in the Congo (1931); instead, Tintin travels to Borduria to rescue Calculus, "not to fight or expose totalitarianism". Calculus became "a genius compromised", with his role being a "counter-position to, or flip-side of, the one he represented in the moon books". When Tintin and Haddock arrive in Borduria, they are "treated as honoured guests but are in fact prisoners of the police state", a reversal of the situation in The Blue Lotus in which Tintin believes himself a prisoner but is in fact a guest. As with The Crab with the Golden Claws (1941), The Calculus Affair was "one long tobacco-trail" with cigarettes representing clues throughout the story. As for the opera house scene in which Tintin and Haddock spy upon Sponsz and Castafiore, he compared it to the scene in David Lynch's 1986 film Blue Velvet in which Jeffrey Beaumont spies on the sexual activities of Dorothy Vallens and Frank Booth.

== Adaptations ==
In 1957, the animation company Belvision Studios produced a string of colour adaptations based upon Hergé's original comics, adapting eight of the Adventures into a series (named Hergé's Adventures of Tintin) of daily five-minute episodes. The Calculus Affair (renamed The Calculus Case) was the eighth such story in the second series, being directed by Ray Goossens and written by Greg, himself a well-known cartoonist who in later years would become editor-in-chief of Tintin magazine.

In 1991, a collaboration between the French studio Ellipse and the Canadian animation company Nelvana adapted 21 of the stories into a series of episodes, each 22 minutes long. The Calculus Affair was the sixteenth and seventeenth episodes of The Adventures of Tintin to be produced. The adaptation only had Borduria as the antagonist country with no mention of Syldavia. Directed by Stéphane Bernasconi, the series has been praised for being "generally faithful", with compositions having been actually directly taken from the panels in the original comic book.
