= Attempted assassination of Bob Marley =

1976 assassination attempt on Bob Marley

- Location: 18°01′11″N 76°46′47″W; Hope Road, Kingston, Jamaica
- Date: 3 December 1976; 49 years ago 8:55 (Eastern Time)
- Target: Bob Marley
- Deaths: None
- Injuries: Bob Marley; Rita Marley; Don Taylor; Louis Griffiths
- Perpetrator: Seven armed gunmen (mainly Lester Lloyd Coke)
- Motive: To halt the "politically progressive" music of Marley

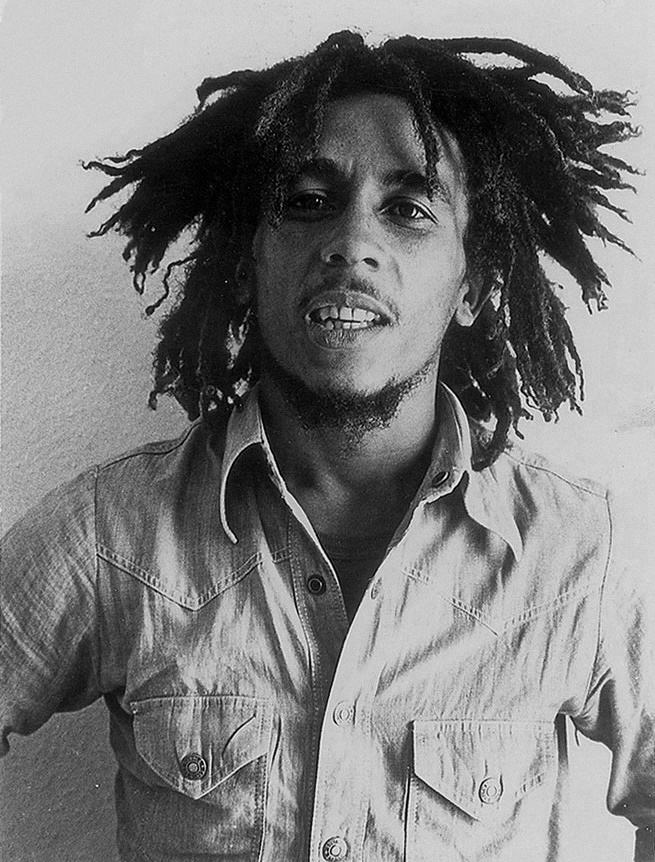
Marley in 1976

On 3 December 1976, seven armed men raided the residence of reggae musician Bob Marley in Kingston, Jamaica, two days before Marley was to stage the Smile Jamaica Concert in an attempt to quell recent violence. Politicians from across the political spectrum hoped to capitalize on Marley's support. While Marley remained neutral, many viewed him as tacitly supporting the prime minister Michael Manley and his democratic socialist People's National Party (PNP). Marley and four others were shot, but all survived.

== Shooting ==
At 8:30 pm, on 3 December 1976, two days before the Smile Jamaica Concert, seven men armed with guns raided Marley's house at 56 Hope Road while Marley and his band were on break from rehearsal. Marley's wife, Rita, was shot in the head in her car in the driveway. The gunmen shot Marley in the chest and arm. His manager, Don Taylor, was shot in the legs and torso. Band employee Louis Griffiths took a bullet to his torso as well. There were no fatalities.

=== Motives and perpetrators ===
Timothy White, in his Marley biography, wrote that information he received from Jamaican Labour Party (JLP) and PNP officials, as well as US law enforcement officials, led him to believe that Carl Byah "Mitchell", a JLP gunman, was contracted by the Central Intelligence Agency (CIA) to organize the Marley shooting and that Lester Coke, aka Jim Brown, led the charge on Hope Road. Don Taylor, Marley's manager, said that both he and Marley were present at the court when the gunmen who shot Marley were tried and executed. According to Taylor, before one of the shooters was killed, he said the job was done for the CIA in exchange for cocaine and guns. Marley told concert chairman Trevor Philips that the leader of the JLP, Edward Seaga – Michael Manley's political opponent – was alleged to have ordered his bodyguard, Lester "Jim Brown" Coke, to be present during the shooting. Nancy Burke, Marley's neighbour and friend, recalled hearing Wailers percussionist Alvin Patterson say "Is Seaga men! Dem come fi kill Bob!" After the shooting, numerous reports indicated that the gunmen returned to Tivoli Gardens, a neighbourhood loyal to the JLP and home to the notorious Shower Posse.

After the attack, the American embassy sent a cable titled "Reggae Star Shot: Motive probably political". In the cable, Ambassador Gerard wrote:

"Some see the incident as an attempt by JLP gunmen to halt the concert, which would feature the "politically progressive" music of Marley and other reggae stars. Others see it as a deep-laid plot to create a progressive, youthful Jamaican martyr to the benefit of the PNP. Those holding the latter view note that the four persons shot, three of them including Marley, only suffered minor wounds."

== Aftermath ==
Despite the shooting, Marley promised he would perform one song at the Smile Jamaica Concert on 5 December at National Heroes Park, Kingston. In the event, Bob Marley & The Wailers played for 90 minutes.

=== Depictions in media ===
A book called A Brief History of Seven Killings (2014) by Marlon James features a fictional account of the shooting.

The documentary ReMastered: Who Shot the Sheriff? (2018) is about the attempted assassination.

The biopic Bob Marley One Love (2024) features the shooting at the start of the film.

== See also ==
- A Brief History of Seven Killings by Marlon James
