= 2010 Kingston unrest =

Armed conflict between the Jamaican government and the Shower Posse gang

- Part of the Jamaican political conflict in the war on drugs
Date	23 May – 23 June 2010 (1 month)
Location	Kingston, Jamaica
Result	700+ people arrested; Christopher Coke arrested; 2 police stations burnt down; 85+ guns, 14,000+ rounds of ammunition, and an unknown number of hand grenades, dynamite, ballistic helmets, and protective vests recovered

Belligerents
Jamaica: Jamaica Constabulary Force; Jamaica Defence Force; Foreign support: United States: DEA; Department of Homeland Security	Shower Posse

Commanders and leaders
(Jamaica) Patrick Allen (Jamaica) Bruce Golding (Jamaica) Dwight Nelson (Jamaica) Peter Phillips (Jamaica) Stewart Saunders (Jamaica) Owen Ellington (United States) Janet Napolitano	Christopher Coke

Strength
1000+ soldiers comprising elements of the 1st, 2nd and 3rd Battalions; 300+ police officers DHS P-3 Orion	500+ gunmen (est.)

Casualties and losses
JDF: 1 killed 30 injured JCF: 3 killed 28 injured	26 killed 25 wounded
- 73+ civilians killed (including the estimates for the gunmen and policemen killed); 35+ civilians injured

The 2010 Kingston unrest, dubbed locally the Tivoli Incursion, was an armed conflict between Jamaica's military and police forces in the country's capital Kingston, and the Shower Posse drug cartel. The conflict began on 23 May 2010 as security forces began searching for Christopher "Dudus" Coke, a major drug lord, after the United States requested his extradition, and the leader of the criminal gang that attacked several police stations. The violence, which largely took place over 24–25 May, killed at least 73 civilians and wounded at least 35 others. Four soldiers and police were also killed and more than 500 arrests were made, as Jamaican police and soldiers fought gunmen in the Tivoli Gardens district of Kingston.

Much of the unrest happened in the constituency of the then Prime Minister of Jamaica, Bruce Golding, who said he was "taken aback" by its scale. He was described by the American Broadcasting Company (ABC) as a "known criminal affiliate" of Coke; Golding retorted that this was "extremely offensive". Although the U.S. government considered Golding one of Coke's associates, it said it supported the Jamaican government's attempt to capture Coke.

When prompted as to his whereabouts three days after the mission was launched, police stated they did not know where Coke was. Coke was eventually captured on 23 June, after initial rumors that he was attempting to surrender to the United States. Kingston police arrested him on the outskirts of the city, apparently while a local reverend, Reverend Al Miller, was helping negotiate Coke's surrender to the United States Embassy.

== Background ==
=== History of Shower Posse ===
Lester 'Jim Brown' Coke was the father of Christopher Coke and leader of the Shower Posse gang. The gang gained traction due to material support from the CIA, which would give arms to gangsters supportive of the Jamaican Labour Party in the Jamaican political conflict, such as Shower Posse. After his father's mysterious death in the 1990s, Christopher Coke took over the leadership of Shower Posse and its political garrison in Tivoli Gardens.

=== Manatt, Phelps, & Phillips and Christopher "Dudus" Coke extradition request ===
In a sitting of Parliament on 16 March 2010, Opposition member Dr. Peter Phillips made reference to an alleged contractual arrangement between the Government and a United States law firm Manatt, Phelps & Phillips to lobby the US Government on a treaty dispute between the two countries that had arisen as a result of the Jamaican Government refusing to sign the extradition request for Christopher 'Dudus' Coke, who was wanted in the US on charges relating to narcotics, arms and ammunition trafficking. The Golding Administration refused to sign the extradition request on the claimed basis that the evidence was obtained contrary to Jamaican laws. Golding denied claims that Manatt, Phelps & Phillips was contracted to represent the Jamaican Government.

A US Justice Department filing under the Foreign Agents Registration Act (FARA) showed that Manatt, Phelps & Phillips had secured a contract worth US $400,000 to represent the Jamaican government in the treaty dispute. Karl Samuda, Minister of Industry, Investment and Commerce, made a statement in which he noted that unnamed members of the Jamaica Labour Party had approached Harold Brady, to see whether—through his wide network of international contacts—he could assist in facilitating the opening of discussions between the US authorities and the Government of Jamaica, and thereby seek to resolve what had become a treaty dispute between the US and Jamaica. In a statement made by Golding on 11 May 2010 in Parliament, he revealed that he had sanctioned the initiative to lobby the US Government but that the initiative was to be undertaken by the Jamaica Labour Party and not on behalf of the government.

Following his revelation, the Opposition People's National Party; its youth arm, the PNPYO; and the National Democratic Movement called for his resignation as prime minister. Manatt, Phelps & Phillips maintains that they were contracted on behalf of the Jamaican Government through Harold C.W. Brady of Brady and Co and have since severed ties with the Jamaican Government.

On 17 May 2010, in a televised address to the nation, Golding apologised to the Jamaican people for his involvement in the Manatt affair. He stated that he was prepared to step aside as prime minister and leader of the Party in a meeting of the party executive. The executive rejected his offer and reassured their support for his role as party leader and prime minister. In his statement he outlined new measures including assigning some of his portfolio responsibilities to other government Ministers, and a renewed thrust to enact legislation for: the impeachment of parliamentary members, term limits for the office of prime minister and political party finance reform. He also confirmed that Attorney General and Minister of Justice Dorothy Lightbourne will sign the authorization for the US authorities to commence the extradition case against Christopher Coke.

== Initial unrest ==
=== 23 May 2010 ===
Following the televised address, supporters of Christopher Coke began erecting barricades to the entrances of the Tivoli Gardens Community. This continued for several days as the security forces prepared to enter Tivoli Gardens to serve Coke with the warrant for his arrest. The unrest started on 23 May 2010, when gangsters assaulted four police stations in southwestern Kingston and managed to loot and partially burn out one of the stations. A second police station was also later burnt down.

Afterward, some 1,000 police and soldiers assaulted a public housing complex occupied by heavily armed gangsters defending Christopher "Dudus" Coke, considered one of the world's most dangerous drug lords, who had been indicted in the United States on drug and arms trafficking charges. Cartel gunmen swarmed through West Kingston, battling police and soldiers, and trapping civilians in their homes. The aim of the joint police-military operation was to enter the community, with the objectives being to arrest Coke, clear the blockades, restore law and order and recover illegal guns believed to be in the community.

Coke has a heroic reputation in Kingston's garrisons. He has been likened to Robin Hood because he has helped the community by handing out food, sending children to school and building medical centres.

== State of emergency ==
=== 24–25 May 2010 ===
On the night of 24/25 May 2010, the Jamaican government declared a state of emergency in the capital Kingston and in the parish of St Andrew to last for one month while gunmen were pursued by the security services. 24 May 2010 was also a public holiday (Labour Day).

Security forces broke through barbed-wire barricades and fought their way into the warren-like Tivoli Gardens neighbourhood well into 24 May. While fighting raged in Tivoli Gardens, gun battles spread to other volatile garrisons close to Kingston.

Tivoli was heavily fortified by gangsters in preparation for the inevitable onslaught by the security forces. Molotov cocktail "factories" as well as storage dumps for ammunition were created in various sections of the community to provide quick supply to the gunmen besieging Tivoli.

Electrified barbed wires were used to block the main entrance to the community along with old burnt out cars and sharp metal scraps and cement. These barriers were further fortified by the use of improvised explosive devices made from cooking gas cylinders armed with electronically detonated fuses. Manholes were uncovered and filled with spikes and the roads were lined with additional hidden improvised explosive devices.

Recon operations by JDF helicopters showed well-organized roadblocks made of sandbags, each with three to four men armed with AK-47s and Molotov cocktails. Snipers had also been stationed on roofs so as to kill as many of the lawmen as possible before they could start disassembling the barriers.

According to Colonel Rocky Meade the level of defensive work was becoming of a very well organized militia. Ground reports suggested that it took the soldiers two hours to advance a distance of 200 meters at the start of the operation, a distance that usually takes five minutes.

A surveillance aircraft was seen flying over Kingston on 24 May, bearing identifying marks that belonged to the United States Department of Homeland Security. The aircraft took live video of Tivoli Gardens, which was given to Jamaican ground forces via U.S. law enforcement officers. The aircraft was identified as a Lockheed P-3 Orion. The Jamaican government denied the presence of the aircraft. The denials were repeated by National Security Minister Dwight Nelson after The New Yorker published an article on the raids in Tivoli Gardens. Prime Minister Andrew Holness later admitted that an aircraft from the United States had been involved in gathering information in the raids.

=== 26 May ===
On 26 May, police stated that they had more than 500 people in custody. The civilian death toll was raised to 44.

An independent assessment team said there were "appalling conditions" to be seen in Tivoli Gardens as people were stuck in houses. Lack of food, running water and a surplus of visible bodily waste were reportedly problems faced by many, while dozens of children and toddlers were lost in Rasta City with one wounded woman losing her 18-month-old son on the way to hospital. Corpses belonging to young men under the age of 30 were said to be lining the morgue. Prime Minister Golding said: "The government deeply regrets the loss of lives, especially those of members of the security forces and innocent, law-abiding citizens caught in the crossfire."

Journalists were ordered to "keep back" by the military while buildings were burnt by cartel gunmen, and looting occurred.

=== 27–28 May ===
On 27 May, police said they had located the corpses of 73 civilians. Three members of the security forces (2 JCF and 1 JDF) were reported dead.

Journalists who reported on the scene received conflicting information. While soldiers commented little on the events which occurred, the residents of the neighborhood expressed that a massacre took place, a massacre which soldiers were attempting to cover up.

However, independent observers, such as Political Ombudsman Bishop Herro Blair and Public Defender Earl Witter, who visited the community expressed satisfaction with conditions. Residents were also quick to praise the conduct of soldiers.

By 28 May, a total of 22 illegal firearms and 8,550 rounds of ammunition had been seized from the area of operations.

=== 29 May ===
On 29 May, it was reported that 58 members of the security forces had been injured in the operation (30 soldiers and 28 policemen). While rumours persisted that Coke had fled the island, the Police Commissioner Owen Ellington revealed that the police had intelligence that Coke was still in Jamaica. Speaking further on the operation, the head of communications of the Jamaica Defence Force, Colonel Rocky Meade said of Coke's militia "They were very well-organized, they knew what they were doing. We encountered very sophisticated defensive layouts. The resistance was fierce and lasted for about 12 hours,". The security forces presented a slide show and video footage from the operation showing improvised explosive devices rigged to barricades, plastic explosives, shrapnel, rifles and handguns recovered and men walking freely with firearms and using binoculars from high-rise buildings in the community. The soldiers also reportedly found that the explosive devices were attached by wires to remote devices which led to houses in the community with one photograph showing the sprawled body of a man posted at one of these remote control points and who was taken out by a JDF sniper before he could trigger the device. Up to the evening of 29 May a total of 28 guns and 8,885 rounds of assorted ammunition were recovered from West Kingston.

The security forces also discovered a closed circuit television system inside Coke's Presidential Click office, which monitored all the entrances into Tivoli Gardens. They also found large amounts of local and foreign currency in the office.

Referring to the persons who died during the firefight, Commission Ellington said that some of the men who died in the firefight were dressed like females at the time they were killed, emphasized that the police had not interred any bodies, and said the badly decomposed corpses which were slated to be buried in the May Pen cemetery had been removed to a facility with the capability to store them until they were properly identified. Post-mortem examinations were to be conducted on the 73 persons killed by the security forces on Monday, Tuesday and Wednesday of the next week, and the photographs of the dead persons were to be posted on a billboard in Tivoli Gardens. There were two women among the dead, one of whom—based on the state of decomposition of the body—appeared to have been killed before the offensive started.

=== 30 May ===
On 30 May, the last group of persons detained during the nearly week-long operation were released. Over 700 men were detained during the operation, 400 of whom had no address in Tivoli Gardens. The police ended up processing these men to determine if they were wanted by the police in other divisions. These men were suspected to be members of other criminal networks from across the island who had gone into Tivoli Gardens to lend support to Christopher Coke. "They gave false names and they have no address in Tivoli Gardens", reported Commissioner Ellington. After processing most of the approximately 700 persons were released, however more than 50 of these men were wanted by the police for various crimes and remained in custody, and a large number of them were listed as persons of interest and remained under police watch.

Deputy Commissioner of Police (DCP) Charles Scarlett rejected claims that the detainees had been abused and denied basic amenities such as toilets. He said that several interest groups, including the Red Cross, had been allowed to visit the detention centers and expressed satisfaction with the measures that were in place to deal with the persons detained.

Meanwhile, an explosives expert, supported by other former members of the JCF and JDF (who had been dismissed for varying reasons) and thugs loyal to Coke, was suspected of masterminding the elaborate defensive systems established around Tivoli Gardens prior the events of 23 May. The elaborate defence network included booby traps (such as LPG cylinders laced with explosives) and explosive devices. Some which were similar to devices used in Afghanistan by the Taliban and included bits of steel for maiming. Other explosive devices found included Molotov cocktails. Supplementing these booby traps and explosives was an army of thugs estimated to be over 400 strong and arriving from as far away as Montego Bay, Claredon, St. Catherine and St. Thomas. Road blocks consisting of old cars, scrap metal, crates, pallets, sandbags, barrels and discarded household items also formed a part of the defensive systems. The more elaborate road blocks consisted of sandbag-camouflaged concrete slabs with peepholes. The high-rise buildings in the neighbourhood were also prepared as lookout points and signalling centres, with truck tyres placed there, intended to be lit to create smokescreens against possible helicopter assaults.

Ultimately, all of these defensive systems were overcome during the joint JCF/JDF operation mounted in response to the attacks on police stations on 23 May. At the end of the violence a total of 14 police stations had been attacked, including two that had been burnt to the ground.

Ongoing searches for guns in the West Kingston area unearthed 8 more illegal firearms (five of which were discovered on 29 May and the other three (pistols) discovered on 30 May). This brought the total number of illegal weapons retrieved up to 36, along with 9,241 rounds of assorted ammunition for use by SLRs, AK-47s and M16s.

== Aftermath ==
=== Vote of no confidence in the government; Gun count rises ===
Following the revelation that Prime Minister Golding had sanctioned the initiative for the Jamaica Labour Party to hire US lobbying firm Manatt, Phelps & Phillips, and his handling of the extradition request for Christopher "Dudus" Coke, members and groups of civil society, church groups and political parties called for his resignation. With the backing of his party, the Prime Minister maintained that he would continue his term as prime minister. This prompted the opposition People's National Party to table a motion of no confidence. The opposition leader, Portia Simpson-Miller, led the debate in Parliament outlining the arguments for Golding's removal from office and moving that he be censured. The debate lasted for four hours on 1 June 2010, and at the end the motion was defeated 30–28, with members of the House of Representatives voting strictly on party lines.

By 31 May, a total of 40 firearms and more than 9,200 rounds of assorted ammunition had been discovered in the ongoing secondary searches conducted by the security forces with 12 weapons having been discovered around 29 May to 30 May and an additional 7 weapons being found between 30 May and 31 May. The latest discovery (of 7 guns) had been made among debris in garbage trucks leaving the Tivoli Gardens community.

In explaining the difficulties faced in recovering illegal weapons in the area, Commissioner Ellington noted that many of the thugs who were shooting at members of the security forces were themselves hit from distances of over 300 yards. Thus there would be ample time for some residents to retrieve weapons from the slain gunmen as the members of the security forces themselves would have to proceed with caution before attempting to retrieve those firearms after hitting the gunmen.

The Police Commissioner also voiced his doubts about whether or not all the bodies recovered in West Kingston were of persons killed during the security forces' operations; the advanced state of decomposition of some of the bodies led him to believe that they might have been killed prior to the security forces entering Tivoli Gardens.

On 3 June, two more firearms were recovered in Tivoli Gardens, bringing the total number of guns recovered to 52. along with over 10,000 rounds of assorted ammunition.

=== Capture of Coke; Gun count continues to rise ===
Coke was arrested on 22 June 2010 at a police roadblock near the outskirts of Kingston. He had been trying to reach the US Embassy to surrender himself. Reverend Al Miller, an influential evangelical priest who tried to facilitate the surrender, was interrogated by police; he stated that Coke had decided to give himself up, but had feared he would be killed if he surrendered directly to police and decided to give himself up at the Embassy instead, and claimed to have been asked for aid by Coke. Coke was reportedly disguised as a woman when he was arrested.

Two days after Coke's capture, the security forces found more guns and ammunition in Tivoli Gardens, bringing the total number of guns recovered to 88 with over 14,000 rounds of ammunition also recovered. These illegal guns included over 40 pistols and 45 rifles/shotguns, ranging from sub-machine guns and Type 56 assault rifles to .22 pistols. The recovered ammunition included a wide assortment such as 7.62mm, and 5.56mm rounds for rifles, to 9mm rounds which can be used in handguns and submachine guns. In addition to guns and ammunition the security forces also recovered 19 grenades, 32 improvised explosive devices (IEDs) and 34 "other forms of explosives".

=== Extradition of Coke ===
In a 15-minute hearing, Coke waived his right to an extradition trial before a judge. The hearing took place under heavy security at a military outpost in Kingston, due to fears of possible attacks by supporters. Coke was then taken to Norman Manley International Airport by a military helicopter, transferred to a US aircraft, and flown to New York, where he was taken into custody by DEA agents.

In 2011, Coke pleaded guilty to racketeering and drug-related charges in a New York Federal court, and was sentenced to 23 years in prison on 8 June 2012.

== International response and legacies ==
Several airlines cancelled flights to and from Kingston after foreign governments issued emergency warnings against travel to the city. Canadians were told not to travel to Kingston unless their journey was essential. Meanwhile, the fifth one-dayer cricket match and first Test cricket match between West Indies and South Africa were transferred to Trinidad due to security fears. On 27 May 2010, the Inter-American Commission on Human Rights called for an impartial inquiry into the unrest. Amnesty International and Jamaica's third party have echoed these sentiments. In 2013, the Government of Jamaica announced it would set up a Commission of Inquiry to investigate and report on the operation: the commission, informally known as the Tivoli Inquiry, started sitting in December 2014. It is chaired by Barbados judge Sir David Simmons with Justice Hazel Harris and Professor Anthony Harriott. The Kingston unrest is memorialized in a documentary entitled "Four Days in May: Kingston 2010" created by Deborah A. Thomas of the University of Pennsylvania Department of Anthropology with Junior "Gabu" Wedderburn and Deanne M. Bell. Thomas also developed an installation commemorating the unrest entitled ''Bearing Witness: Four Days in West Kingston'' at the Penn Museum.
