= Jamaican political conflict =

- Part of the Cold War and War on drugs
Date	Since 1943
Location	Jamaica
Status	Ongoing

Belligerents
Jamaica Labour Party; Shower Posse	Jamaica; JCF; JDF	People's National Party

Commanders and leaders
Andrew Holness		Mark Golding

Casualties and losses
- In total 1,081+ deaths

The Jamaican political conflict is a long-standing feud between right-wing and left-wing elements in the country, often involving violence. The Jamaican Labour Party (JLP) and the People's National Party (PNP) have fought for control of the island for years and the rivalry has led to urban warfare in Kingston. Each side claims the other side is controlled by foreign elements; the JLP was accused of being backed by the American Central Intelligence Agency (CIA) and the PNP was accused of being backed by the Soviet Union and Cuba.

== History ==
=== Pre-Independence beginnings ===
By 1943, the JLP and PNP had established themselves as Jamaica's main rival political parties coming out of the recent Caribbean labour unrest. After the election of 1944 violence became a common aspect of their rivalry. Alexander Bustamante began to encourage the attack of PNP sympathizers, claiming they were communists. Alexander Bustamante also started to cater specifically to his political constituents, in such ways as offering migrant work visas specifically along political lines that favoured him.

=== Formation of garrisons ===
Jamaica gained independence in 1962, and by 1963 political parties were paying off members of the "rude boy" subculture to engage in turf warfare with political rivals. Once the JLP came to power, they would demolish a PNP sympathising slum and construct Tivoli Gardens in its place, starting in 1965. The project would be monitored by Edward Seaga and Tivoli Gardens would be a JLP garrison, and the PNP reacted by forming its own garrisons; solidifying the tradition of violent garrison communities in Jamaica. By the 1966 election, gunfights became common, bombings occurred, and police were routinely shot at. This resulted in more than 500 people injured, 20 people dead, and 500 arrested during police raids.

=== Escalation of political violence ===
Sporadic political violence evolved into outright urban warfare after a series of violent outbursts. The Henry rebellion, the Coral Gardens incident, the anti-Chinese riots of 1965, the state of emergency of 1966–67, and finally the Rodney riots. These events were the beginnings of an ethnic nationalist element to Jamaican politics and a further normalisation of political violence in general in Jamaican society.

Political violence became commonplace in Jamaica. Political parties began paying off crime bosses for local gang support. Assassination threats and attempts also started becoming more frequent. By 1974, the PNP openly avowed their support for the principles of democratic socialism. PNP candidate Michael Manley began public praise of Fidel Castro. The JLP emerged as a right-wing counter to this new emerging leftism. The Central Intelligence Agency began supplying weapons to JLP vigilantes.

By the 1976 election, more than a hundred had been murdered during the conflict and political parties began forming paramilitary divisions. In 1978, five JLP supporters were massacred by official Jamaican soldiers. Reggae music became a voice for peace in the country and the landmark One Love Peace Concert was held in hopes of peace. By the 1980 election, 844 people were murdered in political violence preceding the vote.

=== Involvement in the drug trade ===
By the 1980s, the JLP gained control of the country and embraced neo-liberal policies. Gangs began to be unsatisfied with the lessening handouts given by their political leaders and due to DEA campaigns turned away from marijuana smuggling and to the cocaine trade. Newly enriched, these gangs began to be more involved in governing the garrison communities they controlled. The JLP-aligned gang Shower Posse was one of these newly enriched gangs. The CIA was accused of providing Shower Posse with arms, training, and transport to the United States.

=== 2010 Kingston unrest ===
The 2010 Kingston unrest, an armed conflict between Jamaica and Shower Posse, started on 23 May 2010, when members of the group assaulted four police stations in southwestern Kingston and managed to loot and partially burn out one of the stations, with a second police station also burnt down.

On the night of 23 May 2010, the Jamaican government declared a state of emergency in the capital of Kingston and in the parish of St Andrew to last for one month.

After international pressure, the Jamaican government agreed to arrest and extradite famed gang leader Christopher Coke. Some in the Jamaican media speculated that the long time it took to arrest Coke was connected to Prime Minister Bruce Golding's political assistance received from Coke. During the raids and attempts to arrest Coke, violent gunfights would break out throughout Kingston by his allies to prevent his capture.

=== Recent developments ===
Despite many peace accords, it is still common for political parties to pay off criminals for support and encourage paramilitary garrisons. On 7 February 2016, during the campaign for the 2016 Jamaican general election, three people were killed and two other wounded in a shooting at a rally of the Jamaica Labour Party, then part of the opposition. Throughout 2024, a gang war between two gangs, the Ants Posse Gang and the King Valley Gang, for competition over turf and proceeds of criminal activities caused over 50 deaths in Westmoreland Parish, in Western Jamaica.

== Garrison communities ==
Garrison constituencies in Jamaica are housing developments erected by the government, who house carefully selected residents that will wholly support a local politician. As of 2001, about 15 hardcore garrison communities exist in Jamaica. The residents of garrisons form vigilante groups that engage in ongoing political turf wars. Originally these groups were solely politically motivated but eventually they all came to be invested in the drug trade and became what are known as Jamaican posses. These posses are well armed, often equipped with assault rifles and grenade launchers. Since the 1980s, these posses have participated more in the drug trade and relied less on politicians to arm them. Now about 80 per cent of their weapons arrive from South Florida, while other weapons and armour appear to be police-issued – suggesting that corrupt police officials are trading them with the posses.
