= Willie Haggart =

Jamaican gangster

- Born: William Augustus Moore; March 14, 1961; Kingston, Jamaica
- Died: April 18, 2001 (aged 40); Kingston, Jamaica
- Other names: The Chief Of Staff, Willie HogHeart, Willy GoodHeart,
- Spouse: Angela Moore (m. 1993)
- Children: 18

William Augustus Moore (14 March 1961 – 18 April 2001), better known as Willie Haggart, was a Jamaican gangster, believed to have been an underworld kingpin, and the reputed leader of the Black Roses Crew. Because of his nature, as a young man he was given the nickname "Willie Haggart", a patois corruption of "hog-heart".

== Early life ==
William Moore was in Kingston, the third child born to his parents and attended Jones Town Primary. As a teenager, he was a member of the Wild Bunch crew, led by Anthony "General Starky” Tingle, before linking up overseas, after his mentor General Starky was brutally murdered in Jamaica sometime in 1981.

== Criminal career ==
Haggart was convicted on November 11, 1980 in the Half-Way Tree Court for unlawful possession and fined JMD$50. Police records show that on November 30, 1993 he was convicted for possession of marijuana and was fined JMD$100 or 30 days and in 1995 he was charged with robbery with aggravation, but the case was later dismissed.

=== Black Roses Crew ===
Around the early 1990s, Haggart was invited by Bogle to join his entertainment/party crew Roses which made him popular within the dancehall community worldwide. The 'Willie Bounce' dance move was created and named in his honour.

== Marriage and family ==
Haggart moved back to Jamaica in 1993. On December 18, he married his then common law wife Angela 'Likkle Miss' Moore. The union produced two children, Siobhan and Andrea.

Haggart died acknowledging 18 kids, six of whom were males: "Red Man", Steve, Ryan, "Little Willie", and twins Khorian and Kharian. However, since his death others have come forward claiming that he is their father, potentially raising the figure to over 20 children.

== Death ==
On the afternoon of April 18, 2001, Haggart was sitting and talking with two friends from the Black Roses Crew, Ned "Big Bunny" Hinds and Albert "Blacka Douche" Bonner, on Lincoln Avenue, Kingston 13.

A Toyota Corolla pulled up and three men got out, who immediately opened fire. Hinds and Bonner died instantly, while Haggart died on the way to the hospital. His funeral was very controversial as several members of then Prime Minister P.J. Patterson's government were among the estimated 5,000 who showed up at the National Arena to pay their last respects to the community leader. Among these were Finance Minister and Member of Parliament for South St. Andrew Omar Davies, Minister of Water and Housing Karl Blythe and then Minister of Transport and Works Peter Phillips.

Paul Burke, then chairman of the People's National Party Region Three also attended, as did East Kingston businessman Danhai Williams, Kenneth 'Skeng Don' Black of Clarendon/Mandeville who arrived in a motorcade consisting of several bulletproof cars with motorcycle outriders and Grammy winning deejay, Moses "Beenie Man" Davis.

== Portrayal in popular media ==
- Referenced in Jamaican dancehall musician Junior Cat's 1992 song Top Dog
- Referenced in Jamaican dancehall musician Beenie Man's 1994 song Mobster ( Faada Pump Rifle ), 2006 We Set Di Trend and 1998 song Year Four (Bagpipe Riddim 1998)
- Referenced in Jamaican dancehall musicians Elephant Man (musician) and Spragga Benz's song Warrior Cause
- Referenced in Jamaican dancehall musician Buju Banton's song TOP A TOP (TOPPA DI TOP)

He was featured in several music videos

- Video for Barrington Levy's song Work ft Jigsy King
- Video for Beenie Man's song World Dance
- Video for Bling Dawg's song Zip It Up

== See also ==
- Vivian Blake
- Christopher Coke
- Ranking Dread
- Claude Massop
- Shower Posse
