= Vivian Blake =

Jamaican drug kingpin

- Born: 11 May 1956; Tivoli Gardens, Kingston, Jamaica
- Died: 21 March 2010 (aged 53); Kingston, Jamaica
- Occupation: Smuggler
- Status: Deceased
- Convictions: Drug trafficking and smuggling, Racketeering

Vivian Blake (11 May 1956 – 21 March 2010) was a Jamaican drug kingpin who founded and operated the American operations of the Jamaican Shower Posse.

== Background ==
Blake was born to a poor family in West Kingston, but was granted a scholarship to a private high school, St. George's College. He moved to New York City in 1973, where he started distributing marijuana and cocaine, eventually expanding his network nationwide.

According to New York Daily News columnist Patrice O'Shaughnessy, in a column printed on 30 March 2010, Blake is credited with the dubious distinction of being "one of the creators of crack."

During the 1980s, also according to O'Shaughnessy, Blake was responsible for flooding Bronx localities such as Soundview, Crotona Park and the Bronx River with tons of cocaine and crack cocaine.

Blake and other gang members were charged in a multiple killing in Miami, but he escaped apprehension by travelling to Jamaica. After later charges were added, he was extradited to the United States in 1999. In 2000, he pleaded guilty to charges including racketeering and conspiracy, and admitted to his role in the gang. He was sentenced to 28 years, but was released on parole after eight.

After being released from prison, Blake returned to Jamaica.

Blake died on 21 March 2010 at the age of 53 after being admitted to University Hospital of the West Indies for a heart attack. At the time of his death, he was suffering from kidney disease and undergoing dialysis.

== See also ==
- Willie Haggart
- Lester Lloyd Coke
- Christopher Coke
