= Bob Marley: One Love =

2024 film by Reinaldo Marcus Green

- Theatrical release poster
- Directed by: Reinaldo Marcus Green
- Screenplay by: Terence Winter; Frank E. Flowers; Zach Baylin; Reinaldo Marcus Green
- Story by: Terence Winter; Frank E. Flowers
- Produced by: Robert Teitel; Dede Gardner; Jeremy Kleiner; Ziggy Marley; Rita Marley; Cedella Marley
- Starring: Kingsley Ben-Adir; Lashana Lynch; James Norton
- Cinematography: Robert Elswit
- Edited by: Pamela Martin; Nick Houy
- Music by: Kris Bowers
- Production companies: Plan B Entertainment; State Street Pictures; Tuff Gong Pictures
- Distributed by: Paramount Pictures
- Release dates: January 23, 2024 (Carib 5); February 14, 2024 (United States)
- Running time: 107 minutes
- Country: United States
- Languages: English; Jamaican Patois
- Budget: $70 million
- Box office: $181 million

Bob Marley: One Love is a 2024 American biographical musical drama film based on the life of reggae singer and songwriter Bob Marley, played by Kingsley Ben-Adir, from his rise to fame in the mid-1970s to his death in 1981. The film is directed by Reinaldo Marcus Green, who co-wrote the screenplay with Terence Winter, Frank E. Flowers, and Zach Baylin. It also stars Lashana Lynch as Rita Marley and James Norton as Chris Blackwell.

Bob Marley: One Love premiered at the Carib 5 in Kingston, Jamaica, on January 23, 2024, and was released in the United States by Paramount Pictures on February 14, 2024. It received mixed reviews from critics and grossed $181 million worldwide.

== Plot ==
In 1976, amidst armed political conflict that is affecting daily life in Jamaica, Bob Marley announces that he will perform at Smile Jamaica Concert, promoting peace amongst the warring factions. While preparing for the concert, Marley, his wife Rita, and several other members of his band, Bob Marley and the Wailers, are shot by assailants. Rita and Marley are hospitalized, but survive and recover from their injuries in time for the concert. After performing, Marley, saddened that his own countrymen would try to kill him and his wife, shows the crowd his bullet wounds and walks off stage. He tells Rita to take their children to Delaware, United States, as he and the rest of his band venture to London to record their next two albums.

After struggling to come up with a new album concept, Marley asks Rita to rejoin him and the band in England. Taking inspiration from the soundtrack of the film Exodus and their own situation, he and the band begin recording what would become their album of the same name, in conjunction with a second album that is released in 1978. The album becomes a hit and helps further popularize reggae music and the Rastafari movement around the world. When the recording company schedules a tour in Europe, Marley also aims for stops throughout Africa to inspire the people there. That leads to friction with Rita, as she and Marley argue about his responsibilities and about their infidelities, in addition to having given up on promoting peace back in Jamaica. Marley also gets into an altercation with manager Don Taylor over a financial dispute.

After a toenail infection, caused by being hit by a football, raises concern from Rita and his record producer Chris Blackwell, Marley is later diagnosed with a rare skin cancer. Blackwell confronts Marley about treatment choices, but a firm Marley reluctantly dismisses him. Marley, faced with his own mortality, reconciles with Rita and Taylor and finally decides to return to Jamaica in 1978, where he is welcomed back by a crowd at the airport. Back home, the gunman who had shot him and the others arrives and begs for forgiveness, to which Marley states he "keeps no vengeance." After Marley debuts Redemption Song to Rita and the children about reconciliation, she finally deems him ready to perform a peace concert. The film ends as Marley and his band gear up to perform again for the Jamaican crowd with the song "One Love."

A pre-credits montage shows clips of the real Marley and his band during the One Love Peace Concert, which sees them joined on-stage by the heads of both of Jamaica's political parties, and also reveals that Marley and his band performed in Zimbabwe to celebrate the nation's independence before he died of his cancer in 1981, at the age of 36.

== Cast ==
- Kingsley Ben-Adir as Bob Marley
  - Quan-Dajai Henriques as teenage Bob
  - Nolan Collignon as young Bob
- Lashana Lynch as Rita Marley
  - Nia Ashi as teenage Rita
- James Norton as Chris Blackwell
- Tosin Cole as Tyrone Downie
- Aston Barrett Jr. as Aston "Family Man" Barrett
- Anthony Welsh as Don Taylor
- Hector Roots Lewis as Carlton Carly Barrett
- Alexx A-Game as Peter Tosh
  - Narado Williams as teenage Peter
- Abijah "Naki Wailer" Livingston as Bunny Wailer
  - Courtney Edwards as teenage Bunny
- Stefan A.D Wade as Seeco Patterson
  - Matthew Malcolm Blake as young Seeco
- Sevana as Judy Mowatt
- Michael Gandolfini as Howard Bloom
- Nadine Marshall as Cedella Malcolm
- Umi Myers as Cindy Breakspeare
- Gawaine "J-Summa" Campbell as Antonio "Gillie" Gilbert
- Naomi Cowan as Marcia Griffiths
- David Kerr as Junior Marvin
- Sheldon Sheperd as Neville Garrick
- Andrae Simpson as Donald Kinsey
- Jeff Crossley as Clement "Coxsone" Dodd
- Sundra Oakley as Diane Jobson

== Production ==
=== Development ===
In June 2018, it was announced that Paramount Pictures was developing a biographical drama film based on the life of singer and songwriter Bob Marley, with Marley's son Ziggy Marley serving as a producer. In March 2021, Reinaldo Marcus Green had been hired to direct, with Zach Baylin (who wrote Green's 2021 film King Richard), Frank E. Flowers, and Terence Winter writing the screenplay. In February 2022, Kingsley Ben-Adir was cast as the titular character, after an extensive, year-long, and globe-spanning search by the studio. In August, Lashana Lynch had joined the cast playing as Bob's wife, Rita Marley. In February 2023, Michael Gandolfini, Nadine Marshall, James Norton, and Anthony Welsh had joined the cast.

=== Filming ===
Principal photography began in December 2022 in London and Jamaica in Kingston, Trench Town, Norman Manley International Airport, Bull Bay and Cane River Falls and wrapped in April 2023. The film's title, Bob Marley: One Love, was announced by producer Ziggy Marley at CinemaCon that same month.

=== Music ===
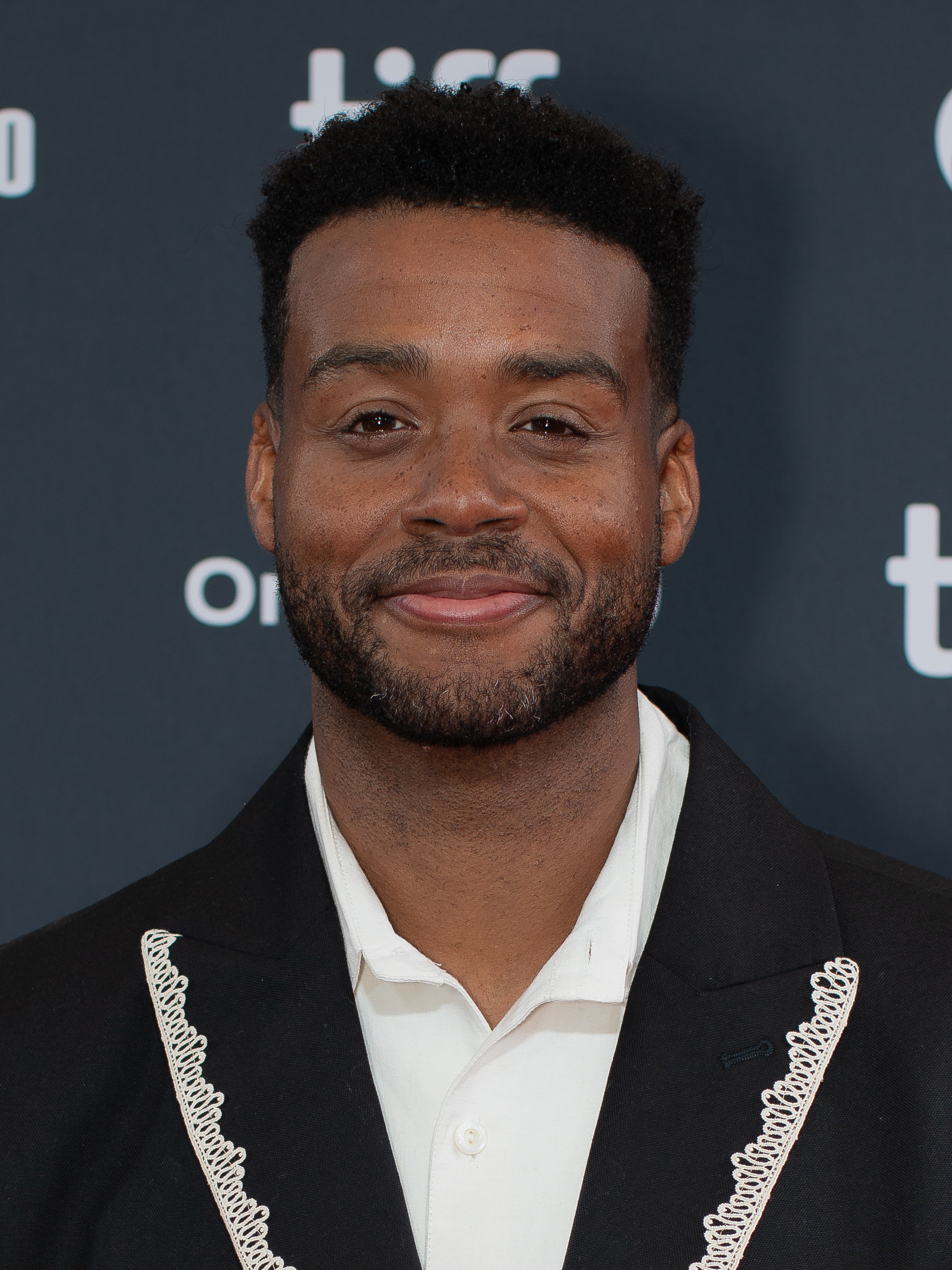
Kris Bowers composed the film's score.

In October 2023, it was reported that Kris Bowers had composed the film's score, after working with Green on Monsters and Men (2018) and King Richard. On January 26, 2024, American country singer Kacey Musgraves released a cover of the Wailers' "Three Little Birds" (1977), part of the film's soundtrack. The soundtrack EP of the film was released on February 14, 2024, by Island Records and Tuff Gong.

== Release ==
Bob Marley: One Love held its world premiere in Marley's hometown of Kingston, Jamaica, on January 23, 2024. It was released theatrically in the United States on February 14, 2024. It was originally scheduled to be released on January 12, 2024. It was released in the United Kingdom on the same day as the North American release.

=== Home media ===
It premiered on Paramount+ and MGM+ in the US and Canada on April 12, 2024, with a linear streaming on the same day.

It was released on 4K Ultra HD, DVD and Blu-ray on May 28, 2024, by Paramount Home Entertainment.

== Reception ==
=== Box office ===
Bob Marley: One Love grossed $97 million in the United States and Canada, and $84 million in other territories, for a worldwide total of $181 million.

In the United States and Canada, One Love was released alongside Madame Web, and was initially projected to gross $30–35 million from 3,536 theaters over its six-day opening frame. The film made $14 million on its first day, a Valentine's Day mid-week record (surpassing The Vow's $11.5 million in 2012), and $3.8 million on its second. After making $7.5 million on Friday, six-day estimates were raised to $46 million. It went on to debut to $51 million over its first six days (including $27.7 million in its opening weekend), finishing first at the box office and marking one of the best openings for a music biopic. In its second weekend the film made $13.5 million (a drop of 53%), remaining in first. It made $7.4 million in its third weekend, finishing second behind newcomer Dune: Part Two.

In Jamaica, the film's opening day gross of $100,000 and an 89% market share set a record for the biggest box office opening of all time in the country.

=== Critical response ===
On the review aggregator website Rotten Tomatoes, 43% of 198 critics' reviews are positive. The website's consensus reads: "Kingsley Ben-Adir does an admirable job in the central role, but Bob Marley: One Love is ultimately a standard biopic that doesn't do justice to its brilliant subject." Metacritic, which uses a weighted average, assigned the film a score of 43 out of 100, based on 36 critics, indicating "mixed or average" reviews. Audiences surveyed by CinemaScore gave the film an average grade of "A" on an A+ to F scale, and those polled at PostTrak gave it a 91% positive score, with 80% saying they would definitely recommend the film.

Lovia Gyarkye of The Hollywood Reporter wrote: "[Ben-Adir] wholly conjures Marley's charisma while also teasing the musician's sense of isolation, stemming from a childhood marked by abandonment. His compelling performance enlivens a film that otherwise feels like it's perpetually struggling to take off." Javier Ocaña of El País called the film "a serviceable biopic that is saved by its soundtrack" while Expresso thought it "showed the man beyond the myth."

Brian Lowry of CNN called the film "a dutiful addition to a recent wave of such biographies (see Rocketman and Bohemian Rhapsody), but a largely uninspired one." The Age's Jake Wilson gave it 1.5/5 stars, called it a "routine biopic" and wrote that "considering this is unlikely to be the last attempt to dramatise Marley's life story, next time it wouldn't hurt if a Jamaican filmmaker had a go." The Atlantic's Hannah Giorgis wrote, "One Love might offer a less daunting entry point than Marley, which can feel intimidating in its scope. But his music and ideas—and all the people who helped usher them into this fractured world—deserve better."

=== Accolades ===
Award	Date of ceremony	Category	Recipient(s)	Result	Ref.
BET Awards	June 30, 2024	Best Movie	Bob Marley: One Love	Won	
Black Reel Awards	February 10, 2025	Outstanding Supporting Performance	Lashana Lynch	Nominated	
Black Reel Awards	February 10, 2025	Outstanding Hairstyling & Makeup	Nadia Stacey and Carla Farmer	Nominated	
Black Reel Awards	February 10, 2025	Outstanding Score	Kris Bowers	Nominated	
Black Reel Awards	February 10, 2025	Outstanding Soundtrack	Bob Marley: One Love (Soundtrack)	Nominated	
NAACP Image Awards	February 22, 2025	Outstanding Motion Picture	Bob Marley: One Love	Nominated	
NAACP Image Awards	February 22, 2025	Outstanding Directing in a Motion Picture	Reinaldo Marcus Green	Nominated	
NAACP Image Awards	February 22, 2025	Outstanding Actor in a Motion Picture	Kingsley Ben-Adir	Nominated	
NAACP Image Awards	February 22, 2025	Outstanding Actress in a Motion Picture	Lashana Lynch	Nominated	
NAACP Image Awards	February 22, 2025	Outstanding Ensemble Cast in a Motion Picture	The cast of Bob Marley: One Love	Nominated	
NAACP Image Awards	February 22, 2025	Outstanding Soundtrack/Compilation Album	Bob Marley: One Love (Soundtrack)	Nominated	
