= Smile Jamaica Concert =

1976 reggae concert headlined by Bob Marley

The Smile Jamaica Concert was a reggae concert held on 5 December 1976 at the National Heroes Park in Kingston, Jamaica, aimed at countering political violence. Bob Marley had agreed to perform, but, two days before the concert, he was shot in his home. He recovered and, with The Wailers, played a 90-minute set for the 80,000 people in attendance.

== Background ==
A general election was due in Jamaica in early 1977, and in 1976 there was an escalation in pre-existing political conflict between supporters of the Democratic Socialist People's National Party (PNP) of Prime Minister Michael Manley and the pro-US opposition Jamaica Labour Party (JLP). A state of emergency was declared in June. In October the Ministry of Culture planned a free concert to bring people together to defuse tension, and asked Marley to participate. Marley was sympathetic, having played the 1975 Wonder Dream Concert. He made several conditions to reduce the apparent link to the PNP, including changing the venue from Jamaica House to National Heroes Park. He wrote the cheery "Smile Jamaica" as a theme song. Although Marley had declared himself politically neutral, and some of his earlier songs had been banned by the government, the JLP now saw his participation as an endorsement of the PNP, especially once Manley, to Marley's chagrin, brought the general election forward to 15 December. While rehearsing with the Wailers at his home studio, Marley, his wife Rita, and two others were shot by assailants, who were never arrested but were suspected to have links to a JLP-affiliated drug gang.

== The concert ==
Poster to the concert

Besides headliners Bob Marley and the Wailers, others on the bill were Third World, Ras Michael, Kiddus I, Richard Ace, and Richard Ace Junior on drums. and Bunny Rugs. The emcee was Elaine Wint, a current affairs broadcaster. An unreleased film of the concert was made by Carl Colby, son of former CIA director William Colby.

Despite the shooting, Marley promised to perform one song ("War") at the concert. The crowd that gathered in National Heroes Park were unsure whether he would turn up until the moment he arrived at the venue. While his injured arm prevented him playing guitar, Marley sang for 90 minutes and rolled up his sleeve at one point to show the crowd his wound, saying "Bang bang, I'm OK".

Marley had previously asked the original Wailers Peter Tosh and Bunny Wailer to participate but they refused for political reasons. All musicians present huddled to decide what songs and parts to play. All current Wailers performed, although Cat Coore of Third World stood in for bassist Aston "Family Man" Barrett, who had gone into hiding after the shooting and arrived late. The I Threes sang backing vocals, Rita Marley still wearing the hospital gown she had been discharged with hours earlier. Others included the horn section from Zap Pow and five hand drummers from the Sons of Negus. There were "over two hundred" people on stage, many providing a human shield for Marley. Prime Minister Manley came on stage before watching the performance from the roof of a van.

The set list was as follows:

1. "War" / "No More Trouble" / "Get Up, Stand Up"
2. "Crazy Baldhead" / "Positive Vibration"
3. "Smile Jamaica"
4. "Rat Race"
5. "Trenchtown Rock"
6. "Keep on Moving"
7. "Want More"
8. "Them Belly Full (But We Hungry)"
9. "Jah Live"
10. "Rastaman Chant"
11. "Rebel Music (3 O'Clock Roadblock)"
12. "So Jah Seh"

== Legacy ==
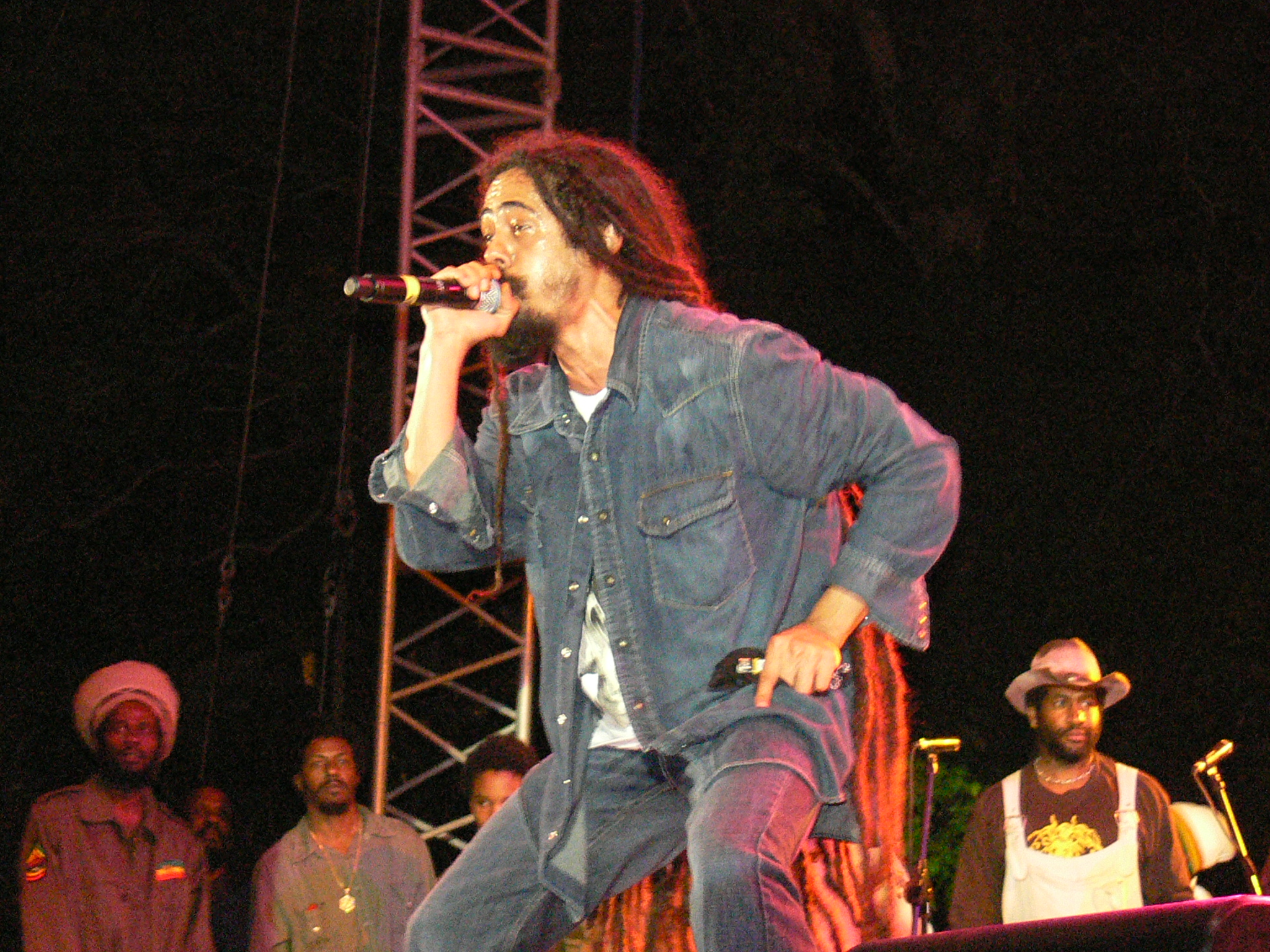
Damian Marley at Smile Jamaica 2008

Marley's performance has been credited with helping the PNP to win the ensuing election. After the concert Marley left Jamaica for Nassau, Bahamas and later London where he stayed for 16 months. He returned in 1978 for the One Love Peace Concert, at which he brought Manley and Seaga on stage for an "awkward" embrace.

Television Jamaica has a morning show named Smile Jamaica, an obvious nod to the popularity of the concert series.

A "Smile Jamaica Hurricane Appeal" concert was held at the Dominion Theatre in London on 16 October 1988, to raise funds for disaster relief after Hurricane Gilbert. It featured U2, Eddy Grant, Boy George, The Christians, Aztec Camera, Five Star, and Joan Armatrading.

"Africa Unite — Smile Jamaica 2008" was a festival organised by Rita Marley and the Bob Marley Foundation, originally scheduled for South Africa but moved for financing reasons to Jamaica in February 2008. Performers included Rihanna, Bunny Wailer, and members of Bob Marley's family.

Stir It Up: The CIA Targets Jamaica, Bob Marley and the Progressive Manley Government, an alternative historical novel by David Dusty Couples, weaves fact and fiction to dramatize the concert.

The novel A Brief History of Seven Killings by Marlon James dramatizes the attempt on Marley's life, including other events leading up to the Smile Jamaica concert.

== See also ==
- List of reggae festivals
- Reggae

== Sources ==
- Salewicz, Chris (2010). Bob Marley : the untold story. New York: Faber and Faber. ISBN 978-0-86547-999-9 – via Internet Archive.
