= Ardenne High School =

High School in Kingston, Jamaica

Location
- 10 Ardenne Road; Caribbean; New Kingston, St. Andrew Parish, Surrey, Kingston 10; Jamaica; 18.014179°N 76.78507°W

Information
- School type: Public school (government funded)
- Motto: Motto : Deo Duce Quaere Optima (With God as Guide, Seek the Best)
- Religious affiliation: Christianity
- Denomination: Church of God
- Established: 1927
- Founder: Reverend George Olson and Nellie Olson
- Status: Open
- Dean: Reverend Mario Samuels
- Principal: Dr. Jacqueline Pinto
- Staff: Approximately 140
- Faculty: 104
- Grades: 7-13
- Age range: 10-20
- Enrollment: 2300
- Sixth form students: Approx. 320
- Language: English
- Hours in school day: 8.5
Colours
Royal blue and gold
- Song: Ye Valiant Youth Arise!
- Accreditation: Ministry of Education, Jamaica
- Newspaper: The Flame
- Yearbook: the torch
- Website: .ardennehighschool.edu.jm

Ardenne High School is a coeducational, first-to-sixth form secondary school located in St. Andrew, Jamaica. The institution is best known for its high academic standards, among the highest in the Caribbean, and for its achievements in the performing arts and several sports. Most notably basketball and netball. The school's only principal is Nadine A Molloy.

== History ==
In 1907, just after the great earthquake that destroyed much of Kingston, the Rev. George and Nellie Olson came to Jamaica as Church of God missionaries from Anderson, Indiana in the United States, where the Church of God has its headquarters. In 1929 the Ardenne property of 12 acres was purchased through funds received from the Missionary Board of the Church of God in the U.S. and other private donors. The main block of buildings was erected. However, it was not until January 1938 that the school was transferred to its present location.

== Achievements ==
- First Female President of York College, Marcia Keisz
- JCDC Marcus Garvey Award winner 6 years Straight 2011-2017

== Alumni ==
- Mikayla Victoria Simpson, who performs under the stage name Original Koffee
- Jody-Anne Maxwell
- Stephen McGregor, singer, songwriter and music producer
- Alkaline, dancehall artist
- Christopher Coke, convicted drug lord and leader of the Shower Posse

== Former headteachers ==
Nellie Olson, the first principal, held office until 1944 when she was succeeded by her daughter Mary Olson. Mary Olson served as principal through most of the schools formative years until 1969 when E.M. Claire Gayle, who had previously served as vice principal, succeeded her. Gayle was succeeded by the fourth principal, Roy J. Ebanks in 1979. When he retired in 1996, Winston Roberts became the fifth principal after serving as vice principal from 1979.During the interim May 1998 to December 1999, as a result of Roberts' illness and ultimate death, Erma J. Hutton served as acting principal. Esther Tyson assumed responsibility as the sixth principal in January 2000, until September 2011. The Reverend Claude Ellis served as acting principal until Miss Nadine A Molloy, past president of the Jamaica Teachers' Association, was appointed the school's seventh principal in September 2012. Since January 2024, Jacqueline Pinto has been serving as the Acting Principal.
