= Christopher Coke =

Jamaican drug lord (born 1969)

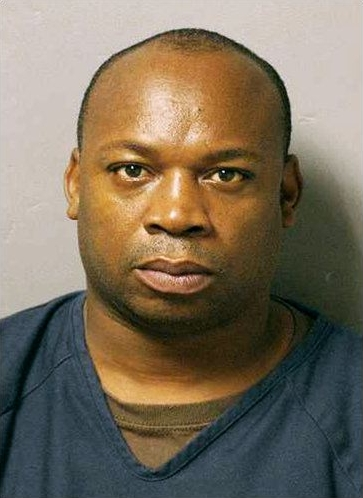
- Born: Christopher Michael Coke; 13 March 1969 (age 57); Tivoli Gardens, Kingston, Jamaica
- Other names: Dudus, Paul Christopher Scott, Presi, President, General, Shortman, Omar Clark
- Education: Ardenne High School
- Occupation: Head of the Shower Posse
- Status: Serving a 23-year sentence at the Federal Correctional Institution, Fort Dix

Christopher Michael Coke (born 13 March 1969), also known as Dudus, is a convicted Jamaican drug lord and the leader of the Shower Posse, a violent drug gang started by his father Lester Coke in Jamaica, which exported "large quantities" of marijuana and cocaine into the United States.

Due to their father's drug profits, Christopher and his siblings grew up amidst wealth and attended elite private schools. His sister and brothers were killed in drug-related violence, in 1990, 1992, and 2005, respectively. Coke was gradually brought into his father's organisation.

After his father died in 1992, Coke, at the age of 23, became the leader of the gang and the de facto authority of the Tivoli Gardens community in West Kingston. He developed community programs to help the poor and had so much local support that Jamaican police were unable to enter the neighbourhood without community consent.

Coke was arrested on drug charges and extradited to the United States in 2010. His arrest had provoked violence among Coke's supporters in West Kingston. In 2011, Coke pleaded guilty to federal racketeering charges in connection with drug trafficking and assault. On 8 June 2012, he was sentenced by the United States District Court for the Southern District of New York to 23 years in federal prison.

== Early life ==
Christopher Michael Coke was born in Kingston, Jamaica in 1969, the youngest son of Lester Lloyd Coke and Patricia Halliburton. He had an older sister and brother.

His father Lester Coke, who was also known as "Jim Brown", was the founder of a violent drug gang called the Shower Posse. Together with the gang's co-founder Vivian Blake, Lester Coke oversaw the distribution of huge amounts of cocaine and marijuana throughout Jamaica and the United States; they were blamed for more than 1000 murders in both countries during the late 1980s and early 1990s.

The gang ruled the Tivoli Gardens neighbourhood of West Kingston, where the Coke family lived. Although the area had a history of extreme poverty, Coke earned immense wealth from the gang's profits and his family lived in luxury. Christopher Coke and his siblings attended school with children of the country's political elite, in Coke's case, Ardenne High School. The family suffered from the violence associated with the competition of the drug trade and their father's activities. Coke's sister was fatally shot in 1990. Coke's brothers were killed in 1992 and 2005.

The United States Department of Justice indicted Lester Coke and other key members of the gang, including Vivian Blake, on drug trafficking and murder charges in 1990. Jamaican authorities arrested them. Two years after his arrest, the senior Coke died in a mysterious fire at the General Penitentiary in Kingston, where he was being held pending extradition proceedings.

== First U.S. convictions ==
Coke spent time in the United States as a teenager. In February 1988 he was arrested in North Carolina and later convicted in Wake County Superior Court of possession of stolen property. On or about 9 May 1988 he received a suspended three-year sentence. Later that year, on or about 16 December 1988, he was convicted in the Eastern District of North Carolina of transporting a firearm in interstate commerce while an illegal alien. After these cases he was deported to Jamaica.

These earlier convictions were not used to enhance his sentence when he pleaded guilty in New York in 2011, because they fell outside the time window the court applied.

== Early criminal charges ==
Coke first came to wider public attention in Jamaica in the early 1990s. In January 1994 he was arrested by the Special Anti-Crime Task Force and charged over a triple murder that took place in Hannah Town on 29 June 1993. The dead were seven-year-old Lamar Mitchell, his five-year-old sister Audrey Anna Collins, and an elderly man named Earl Hines. Their mother, Valerie Barrett, was also shot and left with lasting injuries to one of her hands.

At the same time he faced additional counts of illegal possession of a firearm and of both cocaine and ganja. Court appearances followed in the Kingston Resident Magistrate’s Court and later the Gun Court.

These were not his first brushes with the law. The year before he had been charged with assault and possession of a small quantity of cocaine and ganja; those charges were later dismissed.

=== 1997 kidnapping and "bodies in barrels" discovery ===
In late August and September 1997, Coke was implicated in a high-profile extortion and homicide case following the disappearance of Trinidadian national Stephanie Douglas and two Jamaican men, Roger Henry and Fitzroy Walker. The three individuals had last been seen alive on 27 August 1997, after allegedly visiting a commercial business on Skibo Avenue in Kingston to collect money utilizing Christopher Coke's name without authorization.

During the subsequent investigation, a police detail led by Senior Superintendent Reggie Grant searched the Tivoli Gardens Community Centre on 10 September, detecting spent ammunition casings and apparent human bloodstains on the walls of an interior room. Community centre coordinator Donovan Bowman disputed the forensic value of the find, publicly stating the room was used to keep and slaughter goats for community events. Two days later, on 12 September, investigators acting on intelligence discovered an advanced dumping ground approximately 200 metres west of the train line directly behind the Tivoli Gardens Comprehensive High School.

The search team recovered four sealed cardboard barrels off Industrial Terrace containing the heavily decomposed remains of five individuals, which included two headless and handless corpses, alongside two human skulls. Following an identification parade held at the Criminal Investigation Bureau (CIB) headquarters in Kingston, Coke was formally arrested and charged with triple kidnapping in connection with the disappearances.

== Succession dispute and internal fracture ==
Following the death of Lester Lloyd "Jim Brown" Coke in a February 1992 prison fire, leadership of the West Kingston organization transitioned to his son, Christopher "Dudus" Coke. According to sworn cooperating witness statements submitted by United States federal prosecutors during Christopher Coke's 2012 sentencing phase, this transition marked a violent generational fracture within the gang's hierarchy. Prior to Jim Brown's death, his eldest son, Mark Anthony "Jah-T" Coke, had been slated to take control of the organization but was fatally shot on Maxfield Avenue on 2 February 1992 by former, disloyal members of the Tivoli Gardens system who had embedded themselves in rival territory. Coke's assumption of authority faced immediate resistance from a dissident faction of his father's veteran inner circle who questioned his paternal legitimacy, weaponizing localized street rumors within the Tivoli Gardens enclave that Coke was not Jim Brown's biological son but rather an illegitimate child—locally referred to as a "jacket"—pointing to his short 5-foot-4-inch stature and lack of physical resemblance to his father.

To solidify his authority over his father's old guard and break the internal resistance, Christopher Coke summoned senior members of the organization to a meeting, where he aggressively questioned a veteran lieutenant named "Stumbo" to force him to declare his allegiance. When Stumbo appeared hesitant to accept Coke as the new leader, Coke drew a handgun and fired a shot directly over his head, coercing Stumbo and other older members into compliance. Coke subsequently told gang associates that his father's old guard were no longer his friends and that he intended to permanently restructure the gang's operations by replacing handguns with high-powered automatic weapons to assert complete dominance.

Coke held a veteran member of his father's inner circle, Ludlow Wilson (alias "Blood"), directly responsible for Jah-T's assassination. Internal community accounts indicate the Coke family held Blood culpable for provoking the rival Maxfield Avenue gunmen by conducting an unauthorized shootout in their territory shortly before Jah-T—who was traveling to purchase materials to organize a memorial for Claudie Massop—unwittingly rode his motorcycle directly into the retaliatory ambush. Contemporary police reporting confirmed that Wilson fell sharply out of favor within the Tivoli Gardens community following the 1992 assassination. Coke labeled Wilson an "informer" who was "for dead" and ordered a hit squad to execute him. On the night of Wednesday, 11 August 1993, Wilson was ambushed and shot nine times—including wounds to the forehead, right eye, left ear, and abdomen—near 17 Zacky Avenue, where his bullet-riddled motorcycle was later recovered by investigators. The following morning, witnesses observed two men wheeling Wilson's body on a handcart before abandoning it at the intersection of West Street and Barry Street. At the time of his death, Wilson had four previous criminal convictions and was out on bail awaiting a Gun Court trial for a shooting committed on Nomination Day during the March 1993 general election cycle. Local authorities subsequently arrested and charged a Tivoli Gardens resident, Devon Orville Griffiths (alias "Zion Train"), with the murder.

While U.S. federal prosecutors framed the murder as a direct retaliation for Jah-T's death, alternative accounts within West Kingston suggest that Ludlow Wilson (alias "Blood") had functioned not merely as an inner-circle lieutenant, but effectively as a co-ruler of the Tivoli-based organization alongside Mark Anthony Coke. Consequently, critics and local observers view Christopher Coke's decision to label Wilson an informer and blame him for Jah-T's assassination as a political pretext designed to eliminate a powerful veteran rival, thereby clearing his own path to consolidate absolute authority as the supreme Don.

Approximately one month after Wilson's execution, Christopher Coke retaliated further against the rival faction by gathering senior shooters and high-powered automatic rifles, instructing them to randomly "shoot up the Avenue." This mass assault targeted the area disloyal ex-shower posse elements were thought to be living or hiding on Maxfield Avenue and resulted in multiple deaths and casualties (four or five people were shot on Maxfield Avenue by the shooters that evening, including two women killed as a result of Dudus' orders), finalizing the internal purge and establishing a strict new disciplinary system under Christopher Coke that removed the immunity previously granted to older inner-circle loyalists. This generational rift erupted into a major operational fracture years later, in May 2005, when the police killing of Griffiths ("Zion Train") prompted Coke's younger half brothers, Christopher "Chris Royal" Coke and Leighton "Livity" Coke, to sanction unauthorized retaliatory hits on law enforcement, a direct military escalation that Christopher Coke fiercely opposed to protect his multi-million dollar corporate and construction front companies.

== Transnational distribution and visa coercion ==
In addition to internal community enforcement, federal prosecutors utilized sworn affidavits and testimonies from auxiliary witnesses to substantiate Coke's international operations. A second cooperating witness (CW-2), who managed the organization's American branch, testified that the Shower Posse operated a systematic crack cocaine and heroin distribution network in the Bronx, New York, specifically concentrated between 240th and 241st Streets. Proceeds from these street-level operations were directly funneled back to Jamaica to finance the cartel's high-powered firearms inventory.

Furthermore, during pre-sentencing evidentiary hearings in May 2012, testimonies revealed that Coke utilized severe physical coercion to exploit local sports and travel facilitators. A former high school track coach testified under oath that Coke forced him to secure fraudulent U.S. travel visas for drug couriers by meeting him in a vehicle with a handgun resting in his lap. The witness detailed an instance in late 1998 where a girl aged 12 or younger was brought to him crying, stating that her father had been brutally beaten by Coke's enforcers to compel her participation as a courier in the trafficking scheme. The facilitator ultimately threw away a subsequent batch of passports and fled Jamaica in 2000 out of fear for his life.

=== Other Evidentiary hearing disclosures ===
During special pre-sentencing evidentiary hearings (known as a Fatico hearing) held in May 2012, federal prosecutors introduced detailed under-oath testimony from Coke's former lieutenant, Jermaine "Cowboy" Cohen, to establish the inner workings of the cartel. Cohen testified to the existence of a concrete-slab detention facility within Tivoli Gardens known colloquially as "Java" or "the jail," where individuals who crossed Coke were held, tortured, and executed. Witnesses at the hearing alleged that Coke personally used power tools, including a chainsaw, to dismember a drug dealer nicknamed "Tall Man" who had stolen contraband from the organization. According to Cohen, Coke enforced a strict recruitment rule upon handing over firearms to new members, dictating that losing an assigned weapon or executing unauthorized targets would result in the subordinate's death.

Cohen's testimony also detailed the intersections between Coke's criminal enterprise and prominent Jamaican political and business figures. He identified West Kingston businessman Justin O'Gilvie as Coke's "chief finance minister" who managed the organization's corporate and monetary interests. Furthermore, Cohen testified that a high-profile political mediation meeting took place in 2004 involving Coke, O'Gilvie, businessman Saleem Lazarus, and senior politicians Bruce Golding and Edward Seaga. The meeting was allegedly convened in an effort to mediate and suppress a violent internal gang feud within West Kingston involving Coke's loyalists and a breakaway faction. Cohen stated under oath that he ultimately fled Jamaica via boat through the Bahamas to become a U.S. government informant after his own physical altercation with one of Coke's maternal relatives marked him for execution by the gang.

== Extradition request and violence ==
In 2009 the United States first asked the Jamaican government for the extradition of Coke on drug trafficking charges.

Bruce Golding, the Prime Minister of Jamaica and leader of the Jamaica Labour Party, initially refused to extradite Coke. He claimed that the US had used warrantless wiretapping to gather evidence on Coke. Eavesdropping evidence precipitated the US call for extradition. On 17 May 2010, Golding relented and the government issued a warrant for Coke's arrest.

The Senator Tom Tavares-Finson withdrew as Coke's attorney on 18 May 2010 "in order to avoid conflict of interest."

Following this news, Coke's supporters began protesting and arming themselves. In late May 2010, the national government placed Kingston under a state of emergency after a series of shootings and firebombings within the city. On 24 May 2010, military and police forces launched a large-scale operation in Kingston to arrest Coke. By 27 May, at least 73 people had been killed in clashes between Jamaican security forces and gunmen in West Kingston, primarily in the neighbourhood of Tivoli Gardens. This casualty toll has climbed to a confirmed number of 76 dead victims. Mattathias Schwartz, writing for The New Yorker, reported the death toll at 74, including one soldier.

In 2013, the Government of Jamaica announced it would set up a Commission of Inquiry to investigate and report on the operation: the commission, informally known as the Tivoli Inquiry, first sat in December 2014. It is chaired by Barbados judge Sir David Simmons with Justice Hazel Harris, Professor Anthony Harriott and Velma Hylton QC.

== Capture ==
Coke was detained during a routine roadblock while trying to reach the US Embassy in Kingston for surrender. He attempted to disguise himself as a woman, wearing a woman's wig and possessing a second one and a pair of women's sunglasses; however, the security forces recognised him through his disguise. Reverend Al Miller, an influential evangelical priest, was also detained while trying to facilitate the surrender. Miller told police Coke feared for his life if he surrendered directly to the police, and was asked for aid by Coke. Miller had previously facilitated the surrender of Coke's brother one month earlier.

Fearing for his safety, Coke voluntarily waived his right to an extradition trial so that he could be taken to the US to be tried. Coke's father had died in 1992 in a mysterious prison fire while awaiting an extradition trial in Jamaica. Coke was held under heavy guard while awaiting extradition, as the police feared an attack by his supporters.

Coke said that his decision to surrender and face charges was based on a desire to end the drug-related violence in Jamaica, to which he had lost his sister, brothers and father. He said:

"I take this decision for I now believe it to be in the best interest of my family, the community of western Kingston and in particular the people of Tivoli Gardens and above all Jamaica."

== US Federal court proceedings ==
Coke was held at the federal New York City Metropolitan Correctional Center during the court proceedings. Coke initially pleaded not guilty to federal drug trafficking and weapons trafficking charges in May 2011. On 30 August 2011, he pleaded guilty in front of Judge Robert P. Patterson, Jr. of United States District Court for the Southern District of New York to the following charges: racketeering conspiracy for trafficking large quantities of marijuana and cocaine into the United States, and conspiracy to commit assault in aid of racketeering, for his approval of the stabbing attack of a marijuana dealer in New York City.

Initially scheduled for 8 December 2011, Judge Patterson postponed Coke's sentencing several times to provide time for Coke's defence attorneys and federal prosecutors to obtain information supporting their arguments as to the sentence. Defense attorneys cited members of Coke's family and other supporters, who portrayed him as a benevolent, philanthropic, and well-mannered individual. By contrast, federal prosecutors presented documents depicting Coke as willing to commit brutal acts of violence to support his drug empire, and implicating him in at least five murders. In one, he allegedly dismembered the victim with a chainsaw for stealing drugs from him. The Jamaican government provided evidence derived from wiretapping Coke's cellphone prior to his arrest; it had recorded at least 50,000 conversations dating back to 2004. On 8 June 2012 Coke was sentenced to 23 years in prison. He is now held at the Federal Correctional Institution, Fort Dix in Fort Dix, New Jersey with a release date of 29 January 2028. He has a register number of 02257-748.

== See also ==
- Willie Haggart
- Ranking Dread
- Claude Massop
