= Deborah Thomas =

Deborah Thomas may refer to:

- Deborah A. Thomas, American anthropologist, professor, and filmmaker
- Deborah Thomas (businesswoman), Australian businesswoman
