= A Brief History of Seven Killings =

2014 novel by Marlon James

- Cover of the 2014 hardcover edition
- Author: Marlon James
- Cover artist: Gregg Kulick
- Language: English
- Publisher: Riverhead Books
- Publication date: 2 October 2014 (hardcover, e-book)
- Publication place: United States
- Media type: Print
- Pages: 688
- Awards: 2015 Booker Prize
- ISBN: 978-1780746357

A Brief History of Seven Killings is the third novel by Jamaican author Marlon James. It was published in 2014 by Riverhead Books. The novel spans several decades and explores the attempted assassination of Bob Marley in Jamaica in 1976 and its aftermath, through the crack wars in New York City in the 1980s, and a changed Jamaica in the 1990s.

== Synopsis ==
A Brief History of Seven Killings is introduced by one of its point-of-view narrators, the ghost of Sir Arthur George Jennings, a murdered politician based on Ken Jones, a Jamaican Labour Party (JLP) cabinet minister. There are then five sections, each named after a musical track and covering the events of a single day:

- "Original Rockers: December 2, 1976"
- "Ambush in the Night: December 3, 1976"
- "Shadow Dancin: February 15, 1979"
- "White Lines/Kids in America: August 14, 1985"
- "Sound Boy Killing: March 22, 1991"

The first part of the novel is set in Kingston, Jamaica, in the build-up to the Smile Jamaica Concert (called the Peace Concert in the novel) held on 5 December 1976, and describes politically motivated violence between gangs associated with the JLP and the People's National Party (PNP), especially in the West Kingston neighbourhoods of Tivoli Gardens and Matthews Lane (renamed in the novel as Copenhagen City and Eight Lanes), including involvement of the CIA in the Jamaican politics of the time. As well as Marley (who is referred to as "the Singer" throughout), other real-life characters depicted or fictionalized in the book include Kingston gangsters Winston "Burry Boy" Blake and George "Feathermop" Spence, Claude Massop (an inspiration for Papa-Lo) and Lester Lloyd "Jim Brown" Coke (called Josey Wales in the novel) of the JLP and Aston "Buckie Marshall" Thomson of the PNP.

== Reception ==
James' novel was praised for its mastery of voice and genre, encompassing historical epic, spy novel, gang thriller and mythical saga all at once. Writing in Literary Review, Kevin Power praises Marlon James's energy and imagination in his characters' voices: "his command of a range of tones and voices approaches the virtuoso." However, Power notes the novel's lack of narrative momentum necessary to propel it through nearly 700 pages.

== Awards ==
The book was awarded the 2015 Booker Prize. This was the first time that a Jamaican-born author had won the prize. According to the BBC: "[Booker chair of judges Michael] Wood said the judges came to a unanimous decision in less than two hours. He praised the book's 'many voices'—it contains more than 75 characters—which 'went from Jamaican slang to Biblical heights'".

In a podcast interview, James said he spent part of the £50,000 Booker Prize money on a lamp in the shape of a life-size horse.

Awards for A Brief History of Seven Killings
Year	Award	Category	Result	Ref.
2014	National Book Critics Circle Award	Fiction	Shortlisted	
2015	Andrew Carnegie Medals for Excellence	Fiction	Longlisted	
2015	Anisfield-Wolf Book Award	Fiction	Won	
2015	Green Carnation Prize	—	Won	
2015	Man Booker Prize	—	Won	
2015	Minnesota Book Award	Novel & Short Story	Won	
2015	OCM Bocas Prize for Caribbean Literature	Fiction	Won	
2015	PEN Open Book Award	—	Longlisted	
2016	International Dublin Literary Award	—	Shortlisted	

== Television ==
HBO optioned the novel in May 2015 and is planning a television series, although no debut date has been announced.
