= Danhai =

Danhai may refer to:

- Danhai light rail, a light rail transit line in Tamsui District, New Taipei
- Danhai New Town, a large residential development in Tamsui District, New Taipei, Taiwan
- Danhai Williams, an East Kingston businessman
