= One Love Peace Concert =

1978 Jamaican concert

- Genre: Reggae
- Dates: 22 April 1978
- Location: The National Stadium in Kingston, Jamaica

The One Love Concert (OLPC) was a large concert held on 22 April 1978 at the National Stadium in Kingston, Jamaica.

This concert was held during a political civil war in Jamaica between opposing parties Jamaican Labour Party and the People's National Party. The concert came to its peak during Bob Marley & The Wailers' performance of "Jamming", when Marley joined the hands of political rivals Michael Manley (PNP) and Edward Seaga (JLP).

== Background ==
After he was elected Prime Minister of Jamaica in 1972, Michael Manley pursued a socialist agenda intended to redistribute wealth by nationalizing the country's major export industries. His agenda proved to be financially unsustainable, as his policies deterred foreign investment in Jamaica. Manley was also aggressively opposed by the CIA and American business interests, as had happened to similar reformist governments in Guatemala, the Dominican Republic, and multiple other countries throughout the Americas. Beginning in 1974, he was also opposed by the more conservative Edward Seaga of the Jamaica Labour Party (JLP), and the two politicians hired local gangsters to help them increase their hold on power.

Ironically, the idea for the One Love Peace Concert came from two such gangsters from rival political factions, who happened to be locked up in the same jail cell together and who both wanted to alleviate the violence. Claudius 'Claudie' Massop (JLP) and Aston 'Bucky' Marshall (PNP) decided that the best means to bring the country together was to use music as a uniting factor and organize a major concert. Quickly realizing that Bob Marley, living in exile in London, was a critical element upon which their success depended, Massop flew to London after being released from jail to convince Marley to perform at the event. Marley accepted the invitation, and the concert was Marley's first performance in Jamaica since the "Smile Jamaica" concert held days after he was shot in 1976.

== Concert ==
The One Love Peace Concert brought together 16 of Reggae's biggest acts, and was dubbed by the media as the "Third World Woodstock", "Bob Marley plays for Peace" and simply, "Bob Marley Is Back." The concert attracted more than 32,000 spectators with the proceeds of the show going towards "much needed sanitary facilities and housing for the sufferahs in West Kingston." The concert was kicked off at exactly 5:00 PM with a message from Asfa Wossen, the crown prince of Ethiopia, praising the concert organizers’ efforts to restore peace in Jamaica. This introduction to the event is important in illustrating the growing prevalence of the Rastafari movement in everyday Jamaican culture. The concert was divided into two halves, with the first half devoted to showcasing some of reggae's newer talent, and the second half devoted to the more established artists.

Jacob Miller energetically launched the second half of the concert, during which time Edward Seaga and Michael Manley got to their seats. The highlight of Miller's performance came when he "leaped onto the field with lighted spliff herb and offered it to a police man, donned the lawman’s helmet, jumped back onto the stage and continued the number as he paraded the herb." Alternatively, Peter Tosh took the opportunity during his performance to berate the two political leaders sitting directly in front of him for their positions against legalizing marijuana. His set lasted 66 minutes, and Tosh spent almost half of that time denouncing the problems prevalent in society. At around 12:30 AM, Bob Marley took the stage to perform some of his biggest hits. The climax came during his performance of Jammin’ when he called both Manley and Seaga to the stage, and in a symbolic gesture, the three held up their hands together to signify their unity.

Bob Marley said the following as he called the two politicians onstage, and while he held their hands above his head and said while improvising on "Jammin'":

Just let me tell you something (yeah), to make everything come true, we gotta be together. (Yeah, yeah, yeah) and through the spirit of the Most High, His Imperial Majesty Emperor Haile Selassie I, we're inviting a few leading people of the slaves to shake hands...To show the people that you love them right, to show the people that you gonna unite, show the people that you're over bright, show the people that everything is all right. Watch, watch, watch, what you're doing, because I wanna send a message right out there. I mean, I'm not so good at talking but I hope you understand what I'm trying to say. Well, I'm trying to say, could we have, could we have, up here onstage here the presence of Mr. Michael Manley and Mr. Edward Seaga. I just want to shake hands and show the people that we're gonna make it right, we're gonna unite, we're gonna make it right, we've got to unite. The moon is right over my head, and I give my love instead. The moon was right above my head, and I give my love instead.

== Impact ==
Unfortunately, the event did little to quell the political violence. The event's two organizers, Claude Massop and Bucky Marshall were both killed within two years after the concert. The following election year in 1980 would see 889 reported murders in Jamaica, over 500 more than the previous year.

== Performances ==
This is an incomplete list of the performances. Source:

- The Meditations
  - "Life Is Not Easy"
  - "Woman Is Like A Shadow"
- Althea and Donna
  - "Uptown Top Ranking"
- Dillinger
  - "Teeth And Tongue"
  - "The War Is Over"
  - "Eastman Skank"
- The Mighty Diamonds
  - "Keep On Moving"
  - "There's No Me Without You"
  - "I Need A Roof"
- Junior Tucker
  - "Happy"
  - "Mrs Melody"
- Culture
  - "Natty Never Get Weary"
  - "Natty Dread Taking Over"
  - "Stop This Fussing & Fighting"
- Dennis Brown
  - "Children of Israel"
  - "Love Me Always"
  - "Milk & Honey"
  - "Whip Them Jah"
  - "How Could I Leave"
- Trinity
  - "Who Say They A Gone"
  - "Already"
  - "Yabby You Sound"
- Leroy Smart
  - "Ballistic Affair"
- Jacob Miller and Inner Circle
  - "Forward Jah Jah Children"
  - "I'm A Natty"
  - "Discipline Child"
  - "Shakey Girl"
  - "Top Ranking Special"
  - "Tired Fe Lick Weed"
  - "Peace Treaty Special"
- Big Youth
  - "I Pray Thee"
  - "Every Nigger Is A Star"
  - "In This Ya Time"
  - "House of Dreadlocks"
  - "Isiah The First Prophet Of Old"
  - "Peace At Last"
  - "Old Man River"
  - "Hit The Road Jack"
- Beres Hammond
  - "Smile"
  - "I Miss You"
  - "One Step Ahead"
- Peter Tosh
  - "Igziabeher"
  - "400 Years"
  - "Stepping Razor"
  - "Intro Rap"
  - "Burial/Speech"
  - "Equal Rights"
  - "Speech"
  - "Legalize It"
  - "Get Up Stand Up"
- Bunny Wailer
  - "Blackheart Man"
  - "Fighting Against Convinction"
  - "The Oppressed Song"
  - "Fig Tree"
  - "Dream Land"
  - "Rasta Man"
  - Reincarnated Souls"
  - Armaddeggon"
  - "Bide Up"
  - "This Train"
- Ras Michael and The Sons of Negus
  - "Ethiopian National Anthem"
  - "None A Jah Jah Children No Cry"
  - "Come Down"
  - "in a Amagideon"
  - "A New Name"
- U-Roy
  - "Natty Don't Fear"
  - "Soul Rebel" with The Wailers
- Judy Mowatt
  - "Black Woman"
- Bob Marley & The Wailers
  - "Lion of Judah"
  - "Natural Mystic"
  - "Trenchtown Rock"
  - "Natty Dread"
  - "Positive Vibration"
  - "War"
  - "Jammin"
  - "Jah Live"

== In popular culture ==
The One Love Peace Conference is part of the plot of the 2024 film Bob Marley: One Love, starring Kingsley Ben-Adir as Marley.

== See also ==
- List of reggae festivals
- Reggae
