= Lester Lloyd Coke =

Jamaican gang leader, founder of the Shower Posse gang

- Born: 1947
- Died: 23 February 1992; General Penitentiary, Kingston, Jamaica
- Other names: Jim Brown, Don Dadda
- Occupation: Leader of the Shower Posse gang
- Successor: Christopher Coke

Lester Lloyd Coke, commonly known as Jim Brown, was a Jamaican drug lord and the founder of the Shower Posse, a gang based out of the Tivoli Gardens garrison community in West Kingston. Coke was identified by the Netflix documentary ReMastered: Who Shot the Sheriff? as present and a party to the shooting of Bob Marley on 3 December 1976.

== Shower Posse ==
After Tivoli Gardens strongman Claudius Massop was killed by police in February 1979, Lester Lloyd "Jim Brown" Coke did not immediately inherit an absolute leadership vacuum. Senior Phoenix Gang leader Carl "Byah" Mitchell remained alive and highly influential within Tivoli Gardens and Denham Town through the 1980 election cycle. Coke consolidated authority over the local remnants of the Phoenix Gang gradually, stepping fully into the primary leadership role as Mitchell's mental and physical health collapsed from years of heavy drug abuse prior to his death at St. Joseph's Hospital on January 10, 1984. Coke subsequently fled Jamaica for the United States later in 1984 following his implication in the Rema killings. While in the U.S., Coke teamed up with Vivian Blake, whose established drug distribution lines integrated with Coke's local enforcers to form the international Shower Posse.

The Shower Posse dealt cocaine and cannabis across Jamaica and the United States. They are also tied to a large number of murders in both countries.

== Criminal history in the United States ==
=== 1984 Miami drug house homicide ===
Following his lead involvement in the May 1984 Rema Killings, an arrest warrant was issued for Coke, prompting him to flee Jamaica for the United States. In late 1984, just six weeks after arriving in the United States, Coke smoked crack cocaine and passed out inside a Miami drug house, making him an easy target for a robbery. The perpetrators stole cash and jewellery from him. In response to the theft, Coke mobilized a heavily armed faction of the Shower Posse to locate the individuals responsible. The search culminated in a retaliatory raid on an inner-city crack house in November 1984, during which gunmen shot and killed five people. One victim, a pregnant woman, was found in a praying position that suggested she was begging for her life, according to officials.

=== Federal racketeering indictment ===
The November 1984 quintuple homicide subsequently served as a foundational component of a federal Racketeer Influenced and Corrupt Organizations Act (RICO) investigation into the organization's activities. In October 1988, a federal grand jury in Miami unsealed a 62-count indictment charging Coke, co-leader Vivian Blake, and dozens of associates with racketeering, drug conspiracy, and multiple counts of murder. The legal proceedings marked the first time federal prosecutors utilized the RICO statute against a Jamaican criminal organization. Coke avoided immediate prosecution on these charges because he was deported to Jamaica in March 1987 to face murder charges re the Rema Killings, where he remained until his arrest and subsequent death during extradition proceedings in 1992.

=== 1985 Miami raid, 1987 deportation, and 1990 detention ===
In July 1985, a U.S. Marshals task force tracked Coke to a safe house in the Norland neighbourhood of Northwest Miami-Dade County, Florida. A heavily armed Special Response Team conducted a morning raid on the residence, arresting Coke along with ten other individuals. Inside the home, law enforcement seized more than 100 pounds (45 kg) of marijuana. Although Coke was initially booked on federal drug trafficking charges, the charges against him were subsequently dropped after another member of the Shower Posse stepped forward to claim sole ownership of the contraband.

Despite evading local drug charges, Coke remained under federal scrutiny. He was subsequently arrested by Immigration and Naturalization Service (INS) agents in Miami after attempting to apply for permanent residency (Green Card) status. Following this arrest, U.S. federal authorities held him in a maximum-security detention facility for over a year before his eventual removal. Jamaican law enforcement initiated extradition proceedings against him relating to a standing May 1985 arrest warrant accusing him of orchestrating a mass shooting in the Rema neighborhood of Kingston in May 1984. However, due to significant delays in the Jamaican bureaucratic system, U.S. federal authorities chose to bypass the lengthy extradition process and deported him to Jamaica on 12 March 1987. Upon arrival, Coke was indicted alongside three co-defendants—Delroy Cephas, Carl Robinson, and Joseph Dunbar—for the fatal shooting of seven people in Rema. The state's case ultimately collapsed after key witnesses recanted their statements, leading to his acquittal.

Coke's legal entanglements continued into the next decade. On 12 July 1990, police detained him in the Corporate Area of Kingston for interrogation regarding an outbreak of gang warfare in the Hannah Town and Fletcher’s Land neighbourhoods. The violence, which had resulted in a shootout on 3 July that wounded five police officers, was reportedly triggered by a search for individuals accused of stealing cocaine, weapons, and having knowledge of the 2 May 1990 murder of Coke's 16-year-old daughter, Bridgette Coke, in West Kingston. Within days of his imprisonment, extradition charges were brought against him. This kept him in jail continuously until he lost his life to a mysterious cell fire almost two years later.

== Criminal history in Jamaica ==
=== Murder of Jerome White (1988) ===
On the night of 10 June 1988, Kingston minibus driver Jerome White was dragged from behind the steering wheel of his Route 40 bus on Spanish Town Road near Darling Street. He was accused by a group of men of “bad-driving” them in their car, taken down the street, and later found stabbed and battered to death.

Coke, described as a building contractor of Building 14, Tivoli Gardens, was arrested by detectives on 6 September 1988 and formally charged with White’s murder following a ruling by the Director of Public Prosecutions. A preliminary enquiry began in the Kingston Resident Magistrate’s Court before Resident Magistrate Mahadev Dukharan.

The enquiry was repeatedly delayed. On 5 October 1988 it was adjourned because the main civilian witness failed to appear. On 31 October–1 November 1988 the Crown called witnesses including Glen Graham, who testified that he had sold a blue Honda Accord to a man known only as “James or Jim Brown” earlier that year; Graham said he could not identify the purchaser in court. The bus owner, Henry Bryan, and Det. Insp. Arthur Martin of the Homicide Squad also gave evidence. The conductor of the bus, Dalton Gayle, could not be located despite repeated efforts by police. Coke was remanded in custody and the enquiry adjourned to 7 November 1988.

=== January 1989 Spanish Town Road incident ===
In January 1989, Coke was involved in a physical altercation at an Esso gas station located at 76½ Spanish Town Road in Kingston. The confrontation began when the gas station's operator attempted to push Coke's smoking vehicle away from a fuel pump to mitigate a fire hazard, leading to an exchange of blows involving Coke, his son Tony(Jah T), and senior gang associate Ludlow "Blood" Wilson. A plainclothes police officer intervened to defuse the initial altercation after Wilson and other members of the mobile party threatened to return with firearms, after which Coke's group temporarily withdrew toward Tivoli Gardens.

Shortly following the initial dispute, responding police units intercepted the returning convoy near Mother White's Bridge on Spanish Town Road. A shootout ensued between the authorities and individuals in the convoy, resulting in the injury of a police constable and the death of a Tivoli Gardens enforcer named Michael Powell. The incident escalated security concerns in the area, requiring a continuous police guard at the gas station due to subsequent bomb threats, and it drew public statements from People's National Party (PNP) officials Michael Manley and Portia Simpson, who clarified that the dispute was entirely non-political.

=== Rema killings (1984) ===
In May 1984, a violent clash broke out between factions of the Jamaica Labour Party (JLP) in the neighbouring West Kingston communities of Tivoli Gardens and Wilton Gardens (better known as Rema). The attack arose from an internal political fracture among the neighboring garrison strongholds; activists in Rema felt that Tivoli Gardens was receiving disproportionate political patronage, while Tivolites accused Rema residents of acting as informants. On the morning of 8 May, gunmen from Tivoli Gardens entered Rema, firing into the high-rise blocks. Fighting continued through the night and into the following day. Seven people were killed and several others wounded. Among the dead were Owen Brown, Keith Marshall, and Keith Graham. Houses and businesses were burned, and hundreds of residents fled the area. Following the initial raid, retaliatory feuds spread to Denham Town and Rose Town, ultimately claiming at least 11 lives by late May.

Contemporary reports described gangs of armed youths, some carrying M16s, patrolling the streets and demanding to know the whereabouts of “rats.” The violence was internal to the JLP rather than the usual party-versus-party confrontations of the period. Prime Minister Edward Seaga, who was also the member of parliament for West Kingston, later said the trouble had started with the maltreatment of a young woman from Rema who had a boyfriend in nearby Rose Town. Attacks followed, people from Rose Town fled into Tivoli, and the situation escalated beyond control despite Seaga's direct intervention on 10 May.

In the subsequent police sweep, authorities detained 51 suspects at the Maximum Security facility in Spanish Town. Nine individuals were formally charged with murder in connection with the riots, including 24-year-old Justin O'Givlie of Rema—who would later emerge as a prominent West Kingston businessman and close financial associate of Coke's son, Christopher "Dudus" Coke—and Patrick "Pec Wei" Edward, who was indicted for the Moore Street mass shooting of four laborers, including a seven-year-old schoolgirl.

Coke was widely named in later accounts as having organised or led the raid from Tivoli Gardens. An arrest warrant was issued, prompting his immediate flight from Jamaica to the United States. Several other men from Tivoli were charged. In April 1986, two of them, George Graham and Arthur Morrison, were convicted of the murder of Owen Brown and sentenced to death. Carl Robinson and Joseph Dunbar still faced trial at that time. Coke himself was eventually deported to Jamaica in 1987 and faced charges connected to the killings, though the cases against him were repeatedly delayed by problems with witnesses.

- The Edward Seaga Connection to the REMA KILLINGS and JIM BROWN

Coke's close proximity to the political establishment of West Kingston became a frequent point of public controversy and partisan debate.

Following his acquittal in this high-profile, late-1980s murder trial—which occurred after key eyewitnesses recanted their testimony—celebrating supporters wildly fired gunshots into the air in the vicinity of Supreme Court. This forced judges, prosecutors, and other courtroom staff to scurry for cover in fear, sending shockwaves through both the judicial system and Jamaican society as a whole.—local accounts reported that Jamaica Labour Party (JLP) leader Edward Seaga took Tivoli men and JLP Cabinet to Rema to drink a toast, Let bygones be bygones.

These allegations were later heavily weaponized in national political campaigns; during the 1993 election cycle, the People's National Party (PNP) published national advertisements asserting that Seaga had been photographed drinking beer with Coke and other men in Rema following local shootings.

=== Death of daughter and related violence (1990) ===
On the night of 2 May 1990, Coke’s 16-year-old daughter, Bridgette (also known as "Mumpi", pronounced MUM-PIE or MUMP-EYE), was found shot in the forehead in the West Street area of Kingston. Bridgette was a student at Tivoli Comprehensive High School and a resident of Chang Avenue, Tivoli Gardens. She was rushed to Kingston Public Hospital, where she succumbed to her injuries. Two men were subsequently questioned in connection with the killing, including a Special Constable employed by the Transport Authority.

Localized street rumours at the time alleged that she was targeted because she was romantically involved with a member of the rival Spanglers gang—a sworn enemy of the Shower Posse. According to these unverified accounts, Lester Coke and her eldest half brother(Jah T Coke) had reportedly ordered a hit specifically targeting her boyfriend, and she was unintentionally killed during the execution of the ambush.

Two months later, on the evening of 3 July, a well-known Tivoli Gardens political activist — widely identified as Lester JIM BROWN Coke — drove into Hannah Town looking for a man believed to have knowledge of Bridgette’s murder and who was also accused of stealing cocaine and guns. His car was shot up and one of the occupants wounded. The vehicle left the area. Later that night, a group of about 20 youths from Tivoli, some as young as 12 and 13 years old and armed with semi-automatic weapons, entered Hannah Town and engaged in a gun battle with local gunmen. One man was killed and several others, including five policemen caught in the crossfire, were wounded. An AR-15 rifle was recovered at the scene.

Police sources later linked the July violence to the earlier killing of Coke’s daughter and to ongoing disputes over drugs and weapons. A special task force formed by the Commissioner of Police to deal with the upsurge of shootings in West Kingston was reported to be focusing on Coke. He was picked up for questioning a few days later.

== Slaying of Mark Anthony "Jah-T" Coke (1992) ==
Prior to his death, Coke's eldest son, Mark Anthony "Jah-T" Coke—who was known within the West Kingston underworld and law enforcement circles as "Jim Brown 2"—had been heavily investigated by homicide detectives and was slated for a Gun Court trial in August 1990 for his alleged involvement in the April 1990 reprisal gunslaying of 18-year-old Donald Edmondson. Though he had previously secured acquittals on separate motor vehicle larceny charges, his street-level operations increasingly entangled him in violent inner-city feuds. On 2 February 1992, Jah-T was ultimately shot and killed while riding his motorcycle near the intersection of Maxfield Avenue and Spanish Town Road in Kingston, leaving behind his partner, Deborah Golding aka Foxy, and his young children, Lester, Toni, Oneil, Bini, and Javan.

Sworn cooperating witness statements later unsealed in United States federal court revealed that Jah-T was not targeted by an outside faction, but was assassinated by former, disloyal members of the Tivoli Gardens and Shower Posse system who had fallen out with the leadership and embedded themselves within the rival Maxfield Avenue territory. The internal assassination severely fractured the organization's hierarchy and triggered an immediate, bloody retaliatory gang war across West Kingston. Court documents disclosed that the Coke family held veteran inner-circle lieutenant Ludlow "Blood" Wilson directly responsible for the betrayal, accusing him of intentionally baiting enemies into the ambush. Devastated by the murder of his firstborn son, Lester Coke reportedly engaged in a severe narcotics binge inside his jail cell at the General Penitentiary while awaiting extradition, heavily contributing to the volatile circumstances surrounding his own death by fire on 23 February 1992—the exact day Jah-T's funeral was carried out.

== Arrest and death ==
On 12 July 1990, Coke was apprehended by security forces in the Corporate Area following an intensive interrogation sweep related to localized gang violence and the retaliatory investigations surrounding the May 1990 murder of his daughter, Bridgette. Following his detention, he was formally indicted by the United States Department of Justice and remanded without bail to the General Penitentiary in Kingston, where he remained continuously incarcerated for over nineteen months while aggressively contesting his federal drug trafficking and murder extradition orders until his death in custody.

Throughout his adult life, Coke reportedly battled a severe addiction to hard drugs. Those who knew him from childhood recalled a calm, generally pleasant individual, but noted that he changed drastically over time. His heavy crack cocaine use throughout the 1980s is widely speculated to have fuelled his bold, overtly violent actions. On the night of his death, devastated by the murder of his firstborn son, Mark Anthony 'Jah T' Coke, he allegedly engaged in a heavy crack binge inside his jail cell, which is suspected to have triggered the fatal fire.

== Funeral and coroner's inquest ==
Throughout his life, Coke maintained an extensive criminal record with charges ranging from murder and rape to shooting and shop-breaking; however, he was never convicted, as key witnesses consistently failed to appear at his trials, resulting in his release due to a lack of evidence. At the time of his death, he was being held at the General Penitentiary pending a court hearing against an extradition order to the United States to face drug and murder charges. Outside of his garrison enterprise, Coke operated as a legitimate contractor under his construction firm, Reliable Enterprise, and resided with his family at Crawford Avenue in the affluent Kingston 8 district.

Following his death in custody, formal funeral services were arranged for Sunday, 8 March 1992. His body initially lay in state for public viewing at St. Anthony’s Catholic Church during the morning hours before being transferred at 1:00 p.m. to the Tivoli Gardens Community Centre on Seaga Boulevard for a massive 2:00 p.m. ritual service. The proceedings drew large crowds and were heavily managed by members of the local community. During the service, one section was reserved for the Coke family, including his common-law wife Beverly Burgess and their children, while another was occupied by senior figures of the Jamaica Labour Party (JLP). Attendees included Opposition Leader and Member of Parliament for Western Kingston Edward Seaga, who read the first scripture lesson, alongside political figures Bruce Golding, Mike Henry, Ryan Peralto, Olivia Grange, and Tom Tavares-Finson. Coke was buried at May Pen Cemetery alongside his son, Mark “Jah T” Coke, whose burial arrangements had been adjusted earlier that day to accommodate his father's interment.

A coroner's inquest into the death began on 9 March 1992 before Coroner Mahadev Dukharan and a jury. Government consultant forensic pathologist Dr. Royston Clifford testified that Coke was alive when the fire started in his cell, concluding that the cause of death was smoke and soot inhalation with possible carbon monoxide intoxication. When questioned about Coke's failure to raise an alarm, Clifford noted that individuals in the depressive phase of cocaine use can exhibit abnormal behavior and might fail to respond to an immediate fire.

Testimony from inmates regarding prison conditions, warder patrols, and the events on the night of the fire continued through 25–26 March 1992, after which the coroner was scheduled to sum up the evidence for the jury.

== Personal life ==
Outside of his garrison enterprise, Coke operated as a legitimate contractor under his construction firm, Reliable Enterprise, and resided with his family at Crawford Avenue in the affluent Kingston 8 district, while maintaining an official community residence on Seaga Boulevard within Tivoli Gardens. He maintained a centralized household with his common-law wife, Beverly Burgess, who functioned as the family's primary matriarch alongside his mother, Estriana. Together, Burgess and Coke parented five children within their immediate union, which included an eldest daughter Prudence, Mark Anthony ("Jah-T") born 1967 [d. 1992], Camille ("Sandy") born 1972, Leighton ("Livity") born 1977 and Christopher "Chris Royal" Coke born 1981 [d. 2005]. At the time of her father's death in 1992, his daughter Camille was studying overseas as a student at Morley College in London, England. Following decades spent preserving the family's central anchor at the Crawford Avenue estate, Burgess made her transition on Saturday, 23 April 2022, at the age of 72, leaving behind her three surviving nuclear children—Livity, Prudence, and Camille—alongside 17 grandchildren and 17 great-grandchildren.

Coke also fathered several additional children through separate relationships outside of his primary union, including Bridgette Coke born 1974 [d. 1990], Claudia Coke born 1970, Lanchester "Bamma T" Coke born 1991, and Christopher Michael "Dudus" Coke (known intimately within the family as "Mikey"). Sibling testimonies later revealed that Christopher "Dudus" Coke was integrated into the central family household as a young child, living with Burgess and his paternal siblings for a duration of time before ultimately moving back to reside with his biological mother. Under the household's structural dynamics, Burgess acted as a unifying maternal and stepmother figure to all of the outside children, rearing the siblings together within the same domestic environment to forge a fierce, lifelong family bond that persisted long after Lester Coke's 1992 death. Domestically, family members described Coke as a highly protective, stern patriarch who kept his external criminal network fully insulated from his household and strictly prohibited the discussion of Shower Posse operations within the home.

== Legacy and familial aftermath ==
The violent operational philosophies of Lester Coke's children continued to shape West Kingston long after his 1992 death. In April 2005, the police killing of veteran Tivoli Gardens gangster Devon "Zion Train" Griffiths—who had originally been charged with the 1993 retaliatory murder of Ludlow "Blood" Wilson—triggered a sharp tactical rift within the Coke family hierarchy.

Seeking blood revenge for the senior gangster's death, one of Lester Coke's youngest sons, 23-year-old Christopher "Chris Royal" Coke (alias "Royal Blend"), launched an unauthorized ambush on 3 May 2005 alongside an associate at a stoplight on Waterloo Road, fatally shooting Police Corporal Hewitt Chandler. Responding authorities immediately returned fire, killing Chris Royal at the scene. The incident sparked a night of coordinated retaliatory raids against multiple Kingston police stations and exposed a severe fracture between the surviving brothers; Christopher "Dudus" Coke fiercely condemned the killings as an "idiot thing" that threatened his corporate construction interests, placing him sharply at odds with his brother Leighton "Livity" Coke, who led the more aggressive street-level faction.

Chris Royal Coke's son, Shakwon Coke, later achieved prominent international recognition as a junior and collegiate long jump athlete representing Jamaica.

The family's multi-generational association with motorcycle-related fatalities in downtown Kingston re-emerged decades later. On 25 July 2025, Lester Coke—the namesake grandson of Jim Brown and son of the late Mark Anthony "Jah-T" Coke—was killed at the entrance of Tivoli Gardens when his motorcycle collided with a taxi. His death triggered immediate civil unrest downtown, causing residents to mount volatile roadblocks across the corporate area and forcing local security forces onto high alert.
