= Deborah A. Thomas =

American anthropologist

Deborah Ann Thomas
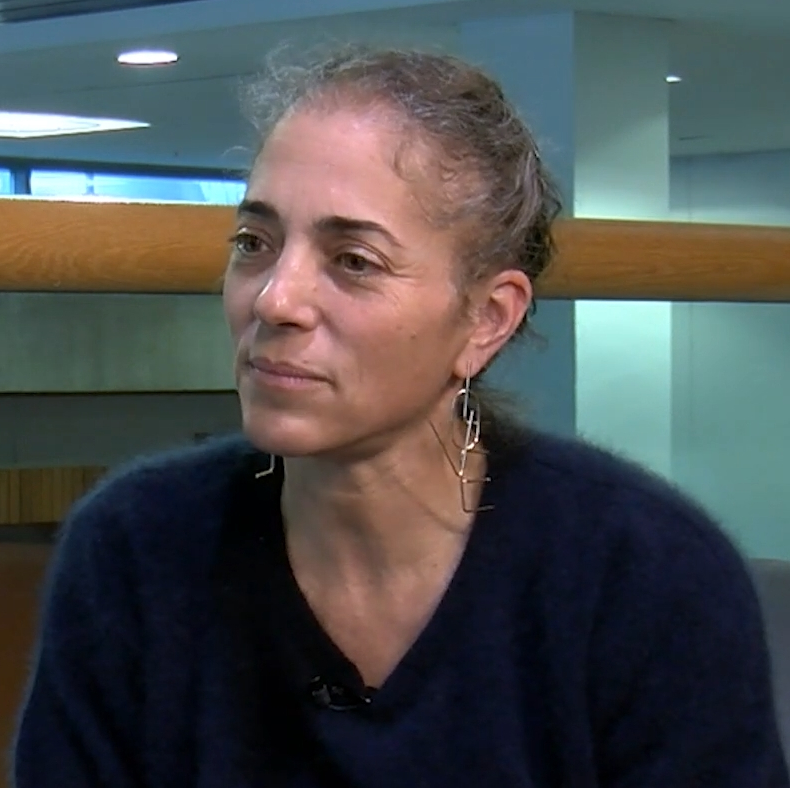
- Thomas in 2019
- Born: 1966 (age 59–60)
- Education: Brown University (BA); New York University (MA, PhD)
- Occupations: Professor of Anthropology, Director of the Center for Experimental Ethnography
- Organization: University of Pennsylvania
- Scientific career
- Fields: Cultural anthropology Ethnic studies
- Thesis: “Tradition's not an intelligence thing”: Jamaican cultural politics and the ascendence of modern blackness (2000)

Deborah Ann Thomas (born 1966) is an American anthropologist and filmmaker. She is the R. Jean Brownlee Professor of Anthropology and Director of the Center for Experimental Ethnography at the University of Pennsylvania. She has published books and articles on the history, culture, and politics of Jamaica; and on human rights, sexuality, and globalization in the Caribbean arena. She has co-produced and co-directed two experimental films, and has co-curated a multimedia exhibit at the University of Pennsylvania Museum of Archaeology and Anthropology. In 2016, she began a four-year term as editor-in-chief of the journal American Anthropologist.

Before pursuing her career as an anthropologist, Thomas performed as a professional dancer with Urban Bush Women, a New York dance company that used art to promote social equity by illuminating the experiences of disenfranchised people.

== Education and career ==
Thomas received her B.A. in semiotics with honors from Brown University in 1988. She continued her education at New York University, earning an M.A. in 1994 from the Center for Latin American and Caribbean Studies and a Ph.D. in 2000 from the Department of Anthropology. Her dissertation, entitled "'Tradition's not an intelligence thing': Jamaican cultural politics and the ascendence of modern blackness," focused on the intersection of identity and politics in Jamaica in the 1990s. It served as the foundation for her first book, Modern Blackness: Nationalism, Globalization, and the Politics of Culture in Jamaica.

After a short time as adjunct professor at NYU, Thomas was a Mellon Postdoctoral Fellow in the Center for the Americas at Wesleyan University from 2000 to 2002. From there, she secured an appointment at Duke University, where she was an assistant professor, in both the Department of Cultural Anthropology and the Women's Studies Program (now Gender, Sexuality & Feminist Studies), between 2002 and early 2006. In January 2006, she was promoted to associate professor.

In 2006, Thomas joined the faculty in the department of anthropology at the University of Pennsylvania as an associate professor. In 2011, she became the R. Jean Brownlee Professor of Anthropology, and between 2009 and 2012 and 2015–2017, she served as chair of the anthropology graduate group. In addition to her appointment in the department of anthropology, Thomas was an affiliate in Penn's Gender, Sexuality, and Women's Studies program; and secured a secondary appointment in Penn's Graduate School of Education.

== Scholarship ==
Deborah A. Thomas has written three books and has published one edited volume, focusing on Jamaican culture and politics. Her studies of Jamaican life have illuminated what is known as the "rude boy" street subculture in Kingston, whose participants have often drawn inspiration in their fashion and comportment from Hollywood cowboy and gangster films and from jazz and soul musical genres. Her research has also explored the continuing legacies of colonial-era violence, and the impact of trauma on memory, in postcolonial Jamaica, while sometimes also bringing the study of Jamaican music, violence, and politics together.

Deborah A. Thomas has directed and produced several films related to her research. Her first film was Bad Friday: Rastafari after Coral Gardens (2011). which blended the use of archival sources and oral histories with Rastafari elders to consider how violence and legacies of trauma persist in shaping postcolonial Jamaican politics and popular beliefs, Her second film was Four Days in May (2018), which again blended visual and textual materials, in this case while giving participants in oral histories the opportunities to memorialize loved ones who died during the 2010 State of Emergency in Kingston, Jamaica. She has described this film as a work of "experimental ethnography". In 2018, Thomas began serving as Director of the Center for Experimental Ethnography at the University of Pennsylvania, which promotes the use of multi-media, "extra-textual", and digital scholarship for the diffusion of learning in the humanities and social sciences.

Deborah A. Thomas has also disseminated scholarship through the medium of a museum exhibit, called Bearing Witness: Four Days in West Kingston, which the University of Pennsylvania Museum of Archaeology and Anthropology featured from November 18, 2017, to March 31, 2020. The exhibit used audio and video footage featuring first-hand accounts of peoples' experiences during the "Tivoli Incursions," which took place at Tivoli Gardens in Kingston Jamaica in May 2010. Bearing Witness: Four Days in West Kingston combined the qualities of an art installation, memorial, and call to action to shed light on how violence impacted people within this Jamaican community. It grew out of a collaborative oral history project called "Tivoli Stories", which Thomas led in 2012 with colleagues including Deanne M. Bell, Junior "Gabu" Wedderburn, and Varun Baker.

In an article about the work of black British feminist theorist Hazel V. Carby, Thomas expressed a major question that runs through her scholarship, which is, "What histories do we inherit?" In 2024, she was elected to the American Academy of Arts and Sciences

== Major publications ==
- Deborah A. Thomas, Modern Blackness: Nationalism, Globalization, and the Politics of Culture in Jamaica. Durham, NC: Duke University Press. 2004. ISBN 978-0-8223-3408-8.
- Kamari Maxine Clarke and Deborah A Thomas, eds., Globalization and Race: Transformations in the Cultural Production of Blackness. Durham, NC: Duke University Press. 2006. ISBN 978-0-8223-3772-0.
- Deborah A. Thomas, Exceptional Violence: Embodied Citizenship in Transnational Jamaica. Durham, NC: Duke University Press. 2011. ISBN 978-0-8223-5086-6.
- Deborah A. Thomas, Political Life in the Wake of the Plantation: Sovereignty, Witnessing, Repair. Durham, NC: Duke University Press. 2019. ISBN 978-1-4780-0669-5.
