= West Kingston, Jamaica =

West Kingston
- Area of Kingston
- Interactive map of West Kingston
- Location within Jamaica
- Coordinates: 17°58′34″N 76°48′04″W
- Country: Jamaica
- Parish: Kingston
- City: Kingston
- Includes Tivoli Gardens and Denham Town
- Time zone: UTC-5 (EST)
  - Summer (DST): UTC-4 (EDT)
- ISO 3166 code: JM-01

West Kingston is an area of Kingston, Jamaica, that includes the communities of Tivoli Gardens and Denham Town. It is known for violence, gangs, and reggae musicians who have emerged from the area.

Violent clashes with police have taken place here, especially in the Tivoli Gardens, including the 2010 Kingston unrest, known locally as the "Tivoli Incursion". CVM Television aired a documentary on this conflict with the military and police that took place in Tivoli Gardens.
