= Dwight Nelson (politician) =

Jamaican politician (1946–2018)

Dwight Nelson (22 July 1946 – 24 December 2018) was a former Jamaican politician. He is the former Minister of National Security of Jamaica until 2011 when his party lost the election.

== Loss ==
He was a former senator and was put as a candidate for MP but lost to Julian Robinson. Dwight Nelson was then excluded from the senate.
