= Rasta City =

Gang in Trinidad and Tobago

Rasta City, also called Seven or 7, is a gang in Trinidad and Tobago. Their main rival used to be Muslim City, but after a falling out between some Rasta City members, a split occurred, leading to the formation of Sixx/6ixx/6 and Seven, the latter of which is now called Rasta City. Their current enemies also include 6 and ABG (Anybody Gets It). The current leader of Rasta City is "Prezzi".

In July 2019, Rasta City leader Akini "Dole" Adams was killed during a police raid in Sea Lots.

In the summer of 2019, musicians Marlon Asher (Marlon Sobers), Izac King (Shaquille Selkridge) and Orlando Octave released a single named "UniTTy" calling for both sides of the war to learn the truth of their faiths and end their gangland killings.

In November 2023 it was reported in the news that Rasta City had agreed to a peace deal with Sixx. However, shootings continued soon after, including an attempted assassination of singer "Kman 6ixx" in December. Several local singers have been alleged to have affiliations with different gangs at various times.
