= Ministry of Culture, Gender, Entertainment and Sport =

Government ministry of Jamaica

The Ministry of Culture, Gender, Entertainment and Sport is a ministry of the Government of Jamaica. The minister since the 2016 election has been Olivia Grange.

Predecessors of the current ministry include the Ministry of Culture and the Ministry of Sports, Youth and Culture; the youth remit from the latter title is now under the Ministry of Education, Youth and Information.

The ministry includes the following agencies:

- Jamaica Cultural Development Commission
- Women's Centre of Jamaica Foundation
- Jamaica Anti-Doping Commission
- The Institute of Jamaica
- Jamaica National Heritage Trust
- National Library of Jamaica
- Sports Development Foundation
