= Ranking Dread =

- Also known as: Winston Brown, Errol Codling, Michael Dicks, Boyark
- Born: Robert Anthony Blackwood c. 1955; Trelawny Parish, Jamaica
- Origin: Kingston, Jamaica
- Died: 1996 (aged 40–41)
- Genres: Reggae, dancehall
- Occupation: Deejay
- Years active: Mid-1970s–early 1980s
- Labels: Burning Sounds, Greensleeves

Ranking Dread (born Winston Brown; c. 1955 – 1996) was a Jamaican reggae deejay and was born in the Jamaican parish of Trelawny but grew up in the Kingston ghettos of Rema and Tivoli. He became famous for his work with the Ray Symbolic sound system in the 1970s. His later years in the UK and North America were ended by legal issues.

== Biography ==
Ranking Dread first became known as a deejay on the Ray Symbolic sound system in Jamaica, but by the late 1970s he had moved to London, where he worked with Lloyd Coxsone's sound system. He released four albums starting with Girls Fiesta in 1978, produced by Linval Thompson, and worked with producer Sugar Minott on his third album, Lots of Loving. He had a minor UK success in the early 1980s with "Fattie Boom Boom", but in the mid-1980s, he faded from the music scene and became more notorious for his criminal activities, where he was labelled "the most dangerous man in Britain and the number one Yardie Godfather". This was backed up by his appearance on a British television programme in the late 1980s entitled The Cook Report. However, when interviewed by the television journalist Ben Chin in 1990 for a Canadian TV documentary, he denied all allegations put to him.

He had been involved with Jamaican gang leader Claude Massop, and was wanted by Jamaican police in connection with over 30 murders. He travelled to the United Kingdom, where he lived under several aliases including Errol Codling, became the head of a Hackney drug-dealing and armed robbery gang, and was wanted by the police there. He was arrested at an illegal drinking club in 1988 and found to be in possession of illegal drugs and deported later that year, officially for entering the country illegally, after being branded the most dangerous foreign national living in Britain. In 1990, after being deported from the United States, he was arrested in Canada for allegedly slashing his girlfriend's face with a knife after entering the country illegally on a fake passport, and attempted to gain refugee status there, claiming that he feared for his life in Jamaica due to his political affiliations.

He was eventually extradited back to Jamaica where he died in prison in 1996.

== Discography ==
=== Albums ===
- Girls Fiesta (1978), Burning Sounds
- Kunta Kinte Roots (1979), Burning Sounds
- Lots of Loving (1980), Stand Firm
- Ranking Dread in Dub (1982), Silver Camel
- 2 Dread Inna Babylon (2006), Silver Kamel (with Massive Dread)
- Most Wanted (2007), Greensleeves

=== Singles and EPs ===
- Disco E.P. Showcase (EP) (1980), Art & Craft
- "I Don't Want To Be No General" (1980), D.E.B.
- "Fattie Boom Boom" (1981), Greensleeves
- "Poor Man Story" (1981), Live And Love
- "Wah We Do" (1981), Live And Love
- "My Mammy" (1982), Greensleeves
- "Shut Me Mouth" (1982), Greensleeves
- "Stylelily" (1998), High Power Music
- "Love A Dub" (2007), Greensleeves
