= Denham Town =

- Residential neighbourhood
- Location within Jamaica
- Coordinates: 17.983509°N 76.8061924°W
- Country: Jamaica
- Parish: St Andrew
- City: Kingston
- Named after: Edward Brandis Denham
- Time zone: UTC-5 (EST)

Denham Town is a predominantly residential neighbourhood in western Kingston, Jamaica. It has a reputation as one of Kingston's more violent areas. It was named in memory of Edward Brandis Denham, Governor of Jamaica 1935–1938.

== Amenities ==
There is a police station, and three schools: Denham Town Primary, St. Alban's Primary (the oldest of the three. It is 127 years old,) and Denham Town High.

== See also ==
- List of cities and towns in Jamaica
