= Jamaican posse =

Loosely affiliated criminal gangs

Jamaican posses
- Founded: 1970s
- Founding location: Kingston, Jamaica
- Years active: 1970s–present
- Territory: Jamaica, United States, Canada, and Great Britain
- Ethnicity: Jamaican
- Activities: Drug trafficking, money laundering, arms trafficking, robbery, kidnapping, fraud, murder, contract killing
- Rivals: Zoe Pound, Junior Black Mafia

Jamaican posses, often referred to simply as posses or massives, is a general term referring to Jamaican organised crime gangs, based predominantly in Kingston, Spanish Town and Montego Bay, and in Jamaican diaspora communities in New York City, Miami, Toronto and London. First being involved in drugs and arms trafficking in the early 1980s, posses have links to the main Jamaican political parties, the Jamaica Labour Party (JLP) and the People's National Party (PNP).

== History ==
Jamaican posses originated in the slums of Kingston as gangs of enforcers for the Jamaica Labour Party, led by Edward Seaga, and the rival People's National Party, headed by Michael Manley. The term "posse" was adopted from Hollywood Western films, which were popular in Kingston and other impoverished areas in Jamaica. Many posses are named after streets or neighbourhoods in Jamaica. The widespread poverty and violence of Jamaican society provided the catalyst for the development of posses. Posses served as an informal system of control over local neighbourhoods, and their development was connected to political nationalism and Rastafari. By the time of the 1980 Jamaican general election, the gangs had killed around 800 people. Although initially political in nature, posses evolved into structured and organised criminal gangs.

=== In the United States ===
Following his election victory, Edwards Seaga launched a crackdown on political opponents, leading many rival posse members to flee to the United States to escape the political infighting of Jamaica. The two largest Jamaican posses in the U.S., the Shower Posse and the Spangler Posse, trace their origins to political parties in Kingston. Many of the other posses in the U.S. are splinter groups of the Shower and Spangler posses.

The first Jamaican posses in the U.S. were first identified in Brooklyn, New York in the 1970s. The groups' activities were initially confined largely to the New York City and Miami areas. Posses later expanded to other cities throughout the country, including Newark, Philadelphia, Hartford, Boston, Washington, D.C., Baltimore, Fort Lauderdale, Cleveland, Chicago, Kansas City, Dallas, Houston, Denver and Los Angeles. Applying their unique form of organisation, structure, violence, and leadership, posses established a foothold in the illegal drug trade soon after their arrival in the U.S., initially in the importation and sale of marijuana before shifting emphasis to the street-level distribution of cocaine in the early 1980s. The change in emphasis from marijuana to cocaine was accompanied by an increased use of violence. Posses also established working relationships with Colombian cartels, traditional organised crime groups, and West Coast street gangs.

Jamaican gangs were largely responsible for the rapid spread of crack cocaine into the American heartland at the height of the crack epidemic in the mid-1980s. The posses' expansion into territories previously controlled by other drug gangs brought them into conflicts with African-American organised crime groups. According to the Bureau of Alcohol, Tobacco and Firearms (ATF), posses were responsible for approximately 1,000 murders between 1985 and 1989. By 1989, posses composed of 10,000 to 20,000 members and associates, most of them illegal aliens, affiliated with approximately 40 gangs operating in 15 metropolitan areas, and controlled an estimated 35 to 40 percent of the crack cocaine market in the U.S.

=== In Canada ===
Members of the Shower Posse took up residence in Canada in the 1970s after fleeing Jamaica when the government of Michael Manley took power. The Shower Posse became heavily involved in the drug trade in Toronto through its connections with local gangs.

=== In Great Britain ===
In the United Kingdom, Jamaican organised crime gangs are known as "yardies". Such gangs proliferated in the UK due to the country's association with former colonies in the Caribbean, and are typically involved in drug-related crime and gun crime. Jamaican crime groups have relatively small organisational structures and operate in association with other Jamaican gangs, although occasional conflicts between groups are manifested in street violence.

After taking control of the crack cocaine trade in London, yardie gangs spread throughout the south of England, and into parts of the Midlands, Wales, the north of England, and Scotland.

== Structure and activity ==
Jamaican posses function as independent groups, each led by their own leaders. Most posses are headed by one or more national leaders, known as "generals". Regional leaders are known as "captains" or "lieutenants". The groups range in membership size from as few as 25 to as many as several hundred. Some posses are composed of autonomous cells. Membership is generally restricted to residents of a particular area of Kingston from which the gang's leaders originate. Posse members are typically single, unemployed males aged between 18 and 35. They live a transient lifestyle, incessantly moving between Jamaican diaspora communities in various cities, and often using false identification. Law enforcement may also struggle to establish the identities of members as they are usually only known to associates by street names.

Posses are involved principally in importing and distributing narcotics, primarily marijuana and crack cocaine. During the 1970s, Jamaican drug gangs in the United States were known for trafficking in "Jamaica gold", a sinsemilla strain famed for its potency. Later, during the crack epidemic of the 1980s, Jamaican posses began sourcing cocaine from Colombian wholesale dealers, and took control of the retail crack market in many black neighbourhoods in the U.S. by forcing out competitors with violence, efficient organisation, a higher quality product, and discount prices.

Another profitable racket for posses has been the theft or illegal purchase of firearms. In 1987, an automatic pistol bought for $350 in Florida could be sold in Jamaica for $1,200. Posse members have a preference for automatic firearms, with the TEC-9 machine pistol being especially popular. Members also partake in armed home invasion robberies. Some members operate as killers for hire. Posses use legitimate businesses to mask or assist illegal activities. The proceeds of criminal activity by Jamaican posses in the U.S. has been used to fund Jamaican political parties in electoral politics and to buy and stockpile weapons for use in political violence in Jamaica, such as coup attempts and intimidation.

=== Violence ===
Posses have a strong propensity to violence, which they use to acquire and maintain territory. Posse members have little regard for public safety or human life. As part of their code, extreme violence is directed at anyone they feel has disrespected them or is in their way. Once in prison, however, their violence is savage but not regular. In 1987, Stephen E. Higgins, Director of the U.S. Bureau of Alcohol, Tobacco and Firearms (ATF), called posses "probably this country's most violent" gangs. James L. Brown, special agent in charge of the Miami district office of the ATF, described a "total disregard for human life" as a hallmark of posses. Explaining the modus operandi of the gangs, William D. West, coordinator of the Mid-Atlantic Organized Crime Drug Enforcement Task Force (OCDETF), said: "I've never seen a group splatter themselves like the Jamaicans do. They actually try to take people out in public places. They don't care if innocent people get hit in the cross fire". U.S. Attorney General Dick Thornburgh called the posses' methods "urban terrorism".

Posse members are known for gun battles with the police and drive-by shootings in disputes with rival gangs over drug turf, as well as for ritualised murders of members who steal drug profits or cooperate with police. Posses have employed a practice known as "jointing", in which an informant is dismembered at the joints using a hacksaw, and the body parts sent to the informant's family. In Jamaica, posses exhibit the attitude that police officers who cannot be corrupted must be killed.

The alleged head of the One Order Gang, Andrew "Bun Man" Hope, was murdered in Spanish Town on 8 February 2006, which sparked a riot the following day.

== Law enforcement investigations and prosecutions ==
Operation Caribbean Cruise, an investigation into Jamaican posses in Washington, D.C. by the Metropolitan Police Department of the District of Columbia, resulted in 27 arrests and the seizure of 13 weapons and $27,000 worth of drugs on February 22, 1986.

A nationwide crackdown on Jamaican gangs across the United States known as Operation Rum Punch led to the arrests of over 150 gang members on drug, homicide and weapons charges during a series of raids by the Bureau of Alcohol, Tobacco and Firearms (ATF) in New York City, Miami, Philadelphia, Boston, Cleveland, Dallas, Denver, Kansas City, Houston, Baltimore, Chicago, Atlanta, Detroit, Los Angeles and the District of Columbia between October 19 and 21, 1987.

At the conclusion of Operation Rum Punch II, a two-year federal investigation, 304 posse members and associates were arrested on charges involving cocaine trafficking, illegal immigration and use of illegal firearms. The suspects were taken into custody during nationwide raids coordinated by the Organized Crime Drug Enforcement Task Force (OCDETF) and centred in Houston, Miami and New York City, as well as Atlanta, Baltimore, Boston, Chicago, Cleveland, Dallas, Denver, Detroit, Hartford, Kansas City, Las Vegas, Los Angeles, Martinsburg, New Orleans, Norfolk, Philadelphia, Raleigh, and Washington, D.C. between October 12 and 14, 1988.

== List of posses ==
- Banton Posse, in Miami, New York City, and Washington, D.C.
- Cuban Posse, in Philadelphia
- Dog Posse, in Boston and Philadelphia
- Dunkirk Boys, in New York City
- Fatherless Crew, in Kingston and New York City
- Jungle Posse, in Philadelphia
- Montego Bay Posse, in Philadelphia and Pittsburgh
- Ragamuffin Posse, in Philadelphia
- Reems Posse, in Philadelphia and Pittsburgh
- Riverton Posse, in Washington, D.C.
- Shower Posse, in Dallas, Miami, New York City, Philadelphia, Pittsburgh, Toronto, and Washington, D.C.
- Spangler Posse, in Miami, New York City, Philadelphia, Pittsburgh, Toronto, and Washington, D.C.
- Super Posse, in Washington, D.C.
- Spanish Town Posse, in Philadelphia
- Tel Aviv Posse, in Boston, Miami, New York City, and Washington, D.C.
- Valley Boys, in New York City
- Waterhouse Posse, in Kansas City, Philadelphia and Washington, D.C.

== See also ==
- Crime in Jamaica
- Politics of Jamaica
