= Claude Massop =

Gang leader

Claude Massop (12 May 1947 – 4 February 1979) was the leader and strongman of the Phoenix Gang, later renamed the Shower Posse, belonging to Tivoli Gardens, Wellington Street, Rema, Denham Town and the surrounding areas of West Kingston, Jamaica.

== Biography ==
=== Early life ===
Massop, who was nicknamed Jack, was born in 1947 in West Kingston's Denham Town. He spent his early life in petty criminal activity mostly as a street hustler and pimp. He then moved into construction work as the chief contractor. By the time he was 18 (1965) he was already the acknowledged leader of what would later become known as the infamous Shower Posse, a gang that was later headed by the notorious Lester Lloyd "Jim Brown" Coke.

=== Gangleader and gangland don ===
By 1967 Massop was a big influence in what would later become Tivoli Gardens, which was at that time nothing more than emerging housing projects for the urban poor. By 1967, Massop's main gang rivals were George "Feathermop" Spence, Winston "Burry Boy" Blake and Anthony (Tony) Welch from the nearby area of Arnett Gardens (Jungle). They were known for their infamous violence and the methods they used to enforce their edicts. Blake and Spence led a motorcycle gang for nearly ten years (1967–76). They were political thugs and enforcers for the then housing minister Anthony Spaulding. The gang included at least thirty men at this time and terrorised victims in Tivoli Gardens, Rema and surrounding areas. Massop had a string of arrests, which included several charges of murder and armed robbery, perjury and shooting with intent but no charges could produce convictions. In January 1978, his chief claim to fame was the so-called "political truce" (Peace Treaty) between him, his close associate and chief lieutenant, Carl "Bya" Mitchell (JLP) and Aston "Buckie Marshall" Thomson (PNP). Before that time, a brutal bloody battle ensued between the two political factions, producing more than 800 deaths by the 1980 general elections between the two political parties (PNP and JLP).

=== Death ===
Massop died on 4 February 1979 after being shot by police (at least 40 times, according to newspaper reports) along with two other men named Lloyd Frazer and Alphonson Trevor Tinson, following a police car chase after leaving a football match in Spanish Town involving the Tivoli Gardens Football Club.
