= Shower Posse =

Jamaican gang which is involved with drug and arms smuggling

- Founded: c. 1981; 45 years ago
- Founders: Vivian Blake and Lester Lloyd Coke
- Founding location: Tivoli Gardens, Kingston, Jamaica
- Years active: c. 1981–present
- Territory: Jamaica, Canada, United States and United Kingdom
- Ethnicity: Jamaican
- Activities: Drug trafficking, firearms trafficking, contract killing, kidnapping, robbery, human trafficking, money laundering, murder
- Allies: Jamaica Labour Party
- Rivals: Zoe Pound, Junior Black Mafia

The Shower Posse is a Jamaican gang, started by Lester Lloyd Coke, which is involved in drug and arms smuggling. Its home is in Tivoli Gardens in Jamaica. It has several North American branches. The North American branches were first founded by Vivian Blake in the Canadian city of Toronto, Ontario. The gang operates in expatriate Jamaican communities in the US states of New York, New Jersey, Pennsylvania, and the city of Miami, Florida.

== Name ==
There are differing reports on the origin of the name. One theory is that it comes from the promises of its associated politicians to shower supporters with gifts. Another view is that it is a reference to the gang showering opponents with bullets. A third theory is that the gang got its name from the Jamaica Labour Party (JLP) election slogan 'Shower', which was a response to the PNP's 'Power' that was coined from Manley's 'Power for the people' slogan in the 1970s.

== Background (Pre-1981) ==
The origins of the Shower Posse are rooted in the localized partisan street warfare that characterized West Kingston during the late 1960s and 1970s. Prior to transitioning into an international drug trafficking syndicate in the 1980s, the organization operated as a political enforcement unit known as the Phoenix Gang (alternatively referred to as the "Phoenix City" gang), based out of the Jamaica Labour Party (JLP) stronghold of Tivoli Gardens.

During this era, the Phoenix Gang was locked in a violent, multi-decade turf war with the Vikings Gang, a rival street faction that aligned with the socialist-leaning People's National Party (PNP) and defended PNP enclaves in neighboring areas like Trench Town. The Phoenix Gang's primary role was to protect JLP loyalists and secure territory for the development of Edward Seaga's newly constructed Tivoli Gardens housing complex, which had replaced the "Back o' Wall" slum.

The conflict between the two groups escalated significantly following the September 30, 1966 assassination of early Phoenix enforcer Rudolph Lewis in Jones Town. Lewis, a prominent 35-year-old JLP organizer attached to Seaga's constituency team and widely known by the street monikers "Zacky" or "Zekie," was targeted and killed, triggering massive retaliatory violence, street bombings, and institutionalizing the "garrison" model of armed, politically homogeneous neighborhoods in West Kingston. Throughout the 1970s, under the leadership of Claude Massop, the Phoenix Gang gradually weaponized and transitioned toward illicit maritime smuggling to self-finance its territorial defenses, establishing the foundational hierarchy and drug smuggling pipelines that Lester "Jim Brown" Coke would later restructure into the international Shower Posse.

The local government later recognized Lewis's foundational role by naming a prominent residential street in the heart of Tivoli Gardens "Zacky Avenue" in his honor. The street remained a central corridor for the community's subsequent internal conflicts, serving as the August 11, 1993 ambush site of veteran inner-circle lieutenant Ludlow "Blood" Wilson, who was executed under orders from Christopher "Dudus" Coke during a violent generational succession dispute.

== Structure and internal rivalries ==
Historically, the Shower Posse did not operate as a single monolithic entity, but functioned overseas as a loose confederation of multiple independent crews aligned under the broader Jamaica Labour Party (JLP) garrison network. Major factions—such as the Vivian Blake crew and the "Black Tony" crew—operated with separate leadership hierarchies, which frequently sparked severe internal feuds over territory and resource distribution. This operational fracture was further demonstrated by a Florida-based crew loyal to exiled Tivoli Gardens enforcer Carl "Bya" Mitchell. Mitchell's crew launched a series of armed robberies directly targeting Vivian Blake's distribution hubs, culminating in an internal contract hit where Blake was marked for death by Mitchell's gunmen during a targeted raid.

== History ==
After Tivoli Gardens strongman Claudius Massop was killed by police in February 1979, Lester Lloyd "Jim Brown" Coke did not immediately inherit an absolute leadership vacuum. Senior Phoenix Gang leader Carl "Byah" Mitchell remained alive and highly influential within Tivoli Gardens and Denham Town through the 1980 election cycle. Coke consolidated authority over the local remnants of the Phoenix Gang gradually, stepping fully into the primary leadership role as Mitchell's mental and physical health collapsed from years of heavy drug abuse prior to his death at St. Joseph's Hospital on January 10, 1984. Coke subsequently fled Jamaica for the United States later in 1984 following his implication in the Rema killings. While in the U.S., Coke teamed up with Vivian Blake, whose established drug distribution lines integrated with Coke's local enforcers to form the international Shower Posse.

In exchange for the United States' support, the JLP embarked on a campaign of ganja eradication. As ganja was a major cash crop for some Jamaicans, the destruction of acres of the seedlings, sometimes with chemicals which also destroyed legal crops, paved the way for Jamaica to become a major trans-shipment point for cocaine from South America to the United States. The Shower Posse exploited the cocaine trade to amass wealth and influence. The JLP-aligned Shower Posse has been provided with arms, training, and transport to the United States by the Central Intelligence Agency (CIA). The gang's primary activities involve the distribution of crack cocaine and marijuana, and the theft or illegal purchase and exportation of firearms, using violence to expand into new territories.

Coke led the Shower Posse from Kingston while Vivian Blake, who was the other of the two leading figures in the gang, became the gang's most senior member in the United States. According to Metro-Dade Police Department Sergeant Kevin Dougherty, who investigated Coke: "It seemed like Miami was their secondary base of operations". Blake established the Shower Posse's U.S. operations, with cells in Miami, New York City, Kansas City, Chicago, Philadelphia, Los Angeles and other cities, primarily on the East Coast. The Shower Posse became the first Jamaican gang to branch out of New York City into South Jersey. In New Jersey, the gang formed drug networks in Newark, East Orange, Irvington, Camden, Atlantic City, Vineland, Trenton and Bridgeton.

In 1985, Donovan Clarke founded a Shower Posse cell in Philadelphia and the South Jersey counties of Atlantic, Burlington and Camden. The Dog Posse challenged the Shower Posse for control of operations in New Jersey and Philadelphia. On 4 August 1985, a gun battle erupted at a picnic attended by approximately 2,000 Jamaicans in Oakland, New Jersey, during which elements of the Shower Posse and Spangler Posse from Brooklyn and the Bronx fought with the Boston-based Dog Posse and Tel Aviv Posse. Three people were killed, nine were wounded, and police retrieved thirty-three handguns from the scene.

In September 1988, a federal grand jury in Miami indicted 34 members of the Shower Posse, including Blake and Coke. Blake's two half-brothers, Errol Hussing and Tony Bruce, who headed the New York City operations of the Shower Posse, were also indicted.

The Shower Posse was involved in a drug war with the Junior Black Mafia in Southwest Philadelphia during the 1980s and early 1990s.

In 1989, former member Charles "Little Nut" Miller was charged with drug trafficking but agreed to testify against other gang leaders in order to receive immunity. In his testimony – in which he implicated himself in nine murders – Miller revealed his connection to the JLP as a "political enforcer", as well as to the CIA, going as far to state that "the United States made me what I am."

=== 1992–1993 leadership succession ===
Following the death of Lester Lloyd "Jim Brown" Coke in a February 1992 prison fire, leadership of the Shower Posse transitioned to his son, Christopher "Dudus" Coke. According to sworn cooperating witness statements submitted by United States federal prosecutors during Christopher Coke's 2012 sentencing phase, this transition marked a violent generational fracture within the gang's hierarchy. Prior to Jim Brown's death, his eldest son, Mark Anthony "Jah-T" Coke, had been slated to take control of the organization but was fatally shot on Maxfield Avenue.

The New York federal court documents revealed that Christopher Coke held a veteran member of his father's inner circle, Ludlow Wilson (alias "Blood"), directly responsible for Jah-T's assassination, claiming Wilson had deliberately provoked rival gunmen on Maxfield Avenue just prior to Jah-T's arrival to orchestrate an ambush. Upon assuming power, Coke reportedly told gang associates that his father's old guard were no longer his friends and that he intended to reorganize the gang's operations by replacing handguns with high-powered automatic rifles.

Coke labeled Wilson an "informer" and ordered a hit squad to execute him. On Thursday, 12 August 1993, Wilson was killed after being shot nine times along Darling Street near the Tivoli Gardens housing scheme. Following the shooting, his body was loaded onto a handcart and abandoned on nearby Barry Street. The Denham Town Criminal Investigation Bureau (CIB) subsequently arrested and charged a Tivoli Gardens resident, Orville Griffiths (alias "Zion Train"), with Wilson's murder. This internal purge established a strict new disciplinary system under Christopher Coke, removing the immunity previously granted to older inner-circle loyalists.

In 2009, the United States began to demand that Christopher Coke, then leader of the Shower Posse, with extensive and well-known links to the JLP, be extradited to New York, where he would face charges of smuggling drugs and weapons. Then prime minister of Jamaica, Bruce Golding, who was also the Member of Parliament for that district (West Kingston), initially questioned the legality of the request, claiming that warrantless wiretapping had been used to collect information on Coke. However, he eventually relented, after public indignation to what many Jamaicans viewed as a cover-up to protect a politically connected drug trafficker, and on 17 May 2010, an arrest warrant was issued for Coke, leading to a state of civil unrest within Kingston, and especially Tivoli Gardens. Coke was eventually arrested outside of Kingston on 22 June 2010. On Friday, 15 June 2012, a New York federal district court sentenced Coke to two consecutive sentences: 20 years for racketeering and conspiracy, and an additional three years for conspiracy to commit assault.

In January 2021, the former lieutenant of the Shower Posse, Harry "Harry Dog" McLeod, was shot and killed in an attack in Kingston.

== Transnational distribution and media infiltration ==
During its operational peak in the 1980s and 1990s, the Shower Posse's transnational narcotics network relied heavily on an elite infrastructure that intersected with high-profile Jamaican media and political circles. Sworn depositions later unsealed by federal authorities and presented before the Supreme Court of the United States unmasked veteran national journalist and Jamaica Labour Party (JLP) activist Tino Geddes as a long-term operative deeply embedded within the gang's central hierarchy.

Geddes, who maintained intimate personal and operational access to successive Shower Posse leaders—including Claudie Massop, Lester Lloyd "Jim Brown" Coke, and Christopher "Dudus" Coke—coordinated logistics alongside Colombian syndicate handlers. Federal investigative briefs disclosed that this alliance with the Medellín Cartel facilitated widespread arms trafficking, international money laundering pipelines, and major enforcement operations in South Florida, including the October 1986 DuPont Plaza Hotel double homicide in Miami orchestrated to eliminate rogue cartel launderers.

== In popular culture ==
The 2014 novel A Brief History of Seven Killings by Marlon James features a gang called Storm Posse, who share many features with Shower Posse, based in a fictionalised version of Tivoli Gardens named "Copenhagen City".

Christopher Coke and the Shower Posse were the subject of an episode of the Netflix documentary series, Drug Lords, released in 2018. 34 members of the Jamaican Shower Posse were indicted by the Bureau of Alcohol, Tobacco and Firearms in 1988 for RICO which included 62 count indictment. All listed in the indictment including Jim Brown a.k.a. Lester Coke and Vivian Blake were arrested and convicted. Jim Brown however died in Jamaican Police custody right after he was ordered to be extradited to the US.
