= The Disappearers =

2026 novel by Marlon James

- Author: Marlon James
- Set in: Jamaica
- Publisher: Hamish Hamilton (UK); Riverhead Books (US)
- Publication place: London; New York
- English publication date: 1 September 2026 (US); 3 September 2026 (UK)
- Media type: Print
- Pages: 640
- ISBN: 9780241714409
- Website: Hamish Hamilton

The Disappearers is a 2026 novel by Jamaican writer Marlon James, published in the UK by Hamish Hamilton and in the United States by Riverhead Books. It is his sixth novel overall and the first since 2015's A Brief History of Seven Killings to be set in Jamaica. The Disappearers focuses on a group of gay men in Jamaica in the 1980s.

The book was shortlisted for the 2026 Booker Prize.

== Background ==
Marlon James won the 2015 Booker Prize for his novel, A Brief History of Seven Killings, about life in Jamaica in the 1970s. The Disappearers is his first novel set in Jamaica since then. Focused on a group of gay men, the story contains frequent references to 1980s popular culture and gay icons such as Oscar Wilde and Edmund White. The Atlantic describes it as "a gay novel about the uses of a gay novel".

The Disappearers was inspired by an unconfirmed attack on a group of gay men in the author's youth. The alleged victims never came forward. James has said: "I always remember that because of who I am, it could have been me." Having grown up closeted in Jamaica before moving to the United States, he aimed to portray the LGBTQ culture that he had not experienced. He interviewed individuals from a variety of backgrounds, conducted part of his research at the Schomburg Center for Research in Black Culture in New York, and visited London to reconstruct that city's underground gay scene for a flashback set in the 1940s. The finished novel is told in five parts, each from a different perspective.

Jean Genet, a pioneering gay French author, influenced James's choice to have his characters produce the play Fortune and Men's Eyes. The play asks difficult questions about homophobia and The Disappearers focuses on the aftermath of gay bashing. Although there is a lesbian character, James chose to focus on gay men. He felt that Jamaican women such as Michelle Cliff, Patricia Duncker, and Staceyann Chin had represented their communities better than their male counterparts. "The women got it going on. In some ways this was me trying to catch up, 'cause our queer female literature is on point, and it's been going on since the '70s." The characters have a variety of motivations and forms of sexual expression, but all are closeted.

The idea for the novel came to James while he was promoting Moon Witch, Spider King, the second book in a planned fantasy trilogy, in 2022. He sent his initial draft to Jake Morrissey, his editor at Riverhead Books, in June 2025. The editing process concluded in July 2026.

James featured on the BBC Radio 4 programme Take Four Books in October 2026, discussing how The Disappearers connects with three other works that have influenced him: Jessica Hagedorn's Dogeaters (1990), John Rechy's The Sexual Outlaw (1977), and Roberto Bolaño's The Savage Detectives (2007).

== Plot ==
The story centres on a homophobic attack on a gay theatre troupe preparing to stage John Herbert's Fortune and Men's Eyes in 1980s Kingston, Jamaica, and the different strategies the actors adopt to deal with the aftermath.

== Themes ==
Like A Brief History of Seven Killings before it, The Disappearers is violent and graphic. James said that violence was accepted in action movies, but gave people pause when they were faced with the aftermath. In The Atlantic, Stephanie Burt felt that while both books were realist novels, in Burt's view the former concerned characters striving for power while The Disappearers explored how internalized rejection can drive people to self-erasure or revenge. The New Yorker added that despite the book's focus on homophobia and internalized hatred, "Many of the characters don't shun their homosexuality; rather, they see it as beautiful."

Racism and its intersection with homophobia inform the novel's depiction of the queer community. According to James, "When I lived in Minneapolis, I was far more likely to run into racism in the gay community than homophobia in the Black." It has been observed that the character of Eddy Porteus is spared some of the novel's worst violence due to his light skin. On whether Eddy's mixed-race status represented the tragic mulatto archetype, James expressed interest in his character's thoughts on the subject. He described Eddy as aware that his light skin afforded him some privilege but could not provide happiness. The character "understands the tricky, perverse racial dynamics of a country that thinks it has no racial dynamics".

James did not want to "come across as a hater" when asked about how his novel compared with portrayals of gay men by women authors in A Little Life and The Great Believers. However, he questioned whether depictions of gay men aimed at women risked "de-queer[ing] the gayness even when they amp up the sex. Why are none of these boys ever femme? Is this like lesbian pornography for straight men?"

== Reception ==
In his review, New York Times book critic Dwight Garner called it "the novel of the decade, if not the century thus far". He also called it "one of the signal reading experiences of my adult life" and predicted that James would be nominated for the Nobel Prize in Literature in the coming decades. In a newsletter, New York reported that the review had coincided with the selling-out of the book's 37,000 copies then for sale. The book's American publisher Riverhead Books ordered a second print run of 50,000. A starred review in Publishers Weekly praised the novel's depiction of "the self-annihilating effects of trauma" and concluded, "The author has outdone himself." Kirkus Reviews also gave the novel a starred review, stating "Even when it stress-tests your senses, this sprawling depiction of gay life in Jamaica is galvanizing."

The Guardian's reviewer Yagnishsing Dawoor criticized the pacing of parts of the "overlong" narrative but praised the novel's engagement with figures from the queer canon and its prose, which he characterized as "bitter and hilarious, lyrical, bawdy, pugnacious and scorchingly, ravishingly queer". Sam Sacks of The Wall Street Journal singled out Eddy's chapters early in the book as its strongest. He suggested that James's interruption of the Dark Star trilogy to write The Disappearers both signalled its importance to the author and may have contributed to an ending that "seems merely tacked on".

The novel was shortlisted for the 2026 Booker Prize. It was longlisted for the 2026 National Book Award for Fiction.
