= Barry Blitt =

American political cartoonist

- Born: April 30, 1958 (age 68); Côte Saint-Luc, Quebec, Canada
- Education: Ontario College of Art and Design
- Known for: Illustrator, cartoonist
- Spouse: Angie Silverstein

Barry Blitt (born April 30, 1958 in Côte Saint-Luc, Quebec) is a Canadian-born American cartoonist and illustrator, best known for his New Yorker covers and as a regular contributor to the op-ed page of The New York Times. Blitt creates his works in traditional pen and ink, as well as watercolors.

== Early life and education ==
Blitt grew up in Côte Saint-Luc, Quebec, a municipality on the Island of Montreal. The artist's first publication credit came at age 16: a series of drawings in the Philadelphia Flyers 1974 yearbook. He graduated from The Ontario College of Art and Design in 1982 and moved to the US in 1989.

== Work ==
Blitt first began drawing political cartoons at the Toronto Magazine. He worked for ten years at Entertainment Weekly drawing half-page celebrity cartoons.

In 1993 Blitt began contributing to The New Yorker, Blitt's illustration work has also been featured by publications such as Vanity Fair, Rolling Stone, The Atlantic and others.

The artist is also well known for illustrating Frank Rich's Sunday op-ed column in The New York Times. Regarding that work, Rich is quoted as saying, "It's a long-distance collaboration – me in New York City, Barry in Connecticut – but one of the most satisfying I've had in my career."

Many of Blitt's New Yorker covers have been finalists for the Cover of the Year from the American Society of Magazine Editors, including, in 2008, Narrow Stance and I'll Get It!,First Anniversary in 2010, and The Book of Life in 2012.

Blitt is also credited with animation design by Saturday Night Live Since 2018, Blitt has been designing the program covers for Hunter Theater Project's productions, beginning with Richard Nelson's translation of Anton Chekhov's Uncle Vanya.

== Awards and honors ==
Blitt won the 2020 Pulitzer Prize for editorial cartoons "for his watercolor style and gentle caricatures of the personalities and policies that come from the Trump White House."

Other awards and honors Blitt has received include:

- Les Usherwood Lifetime Achievement Award 2016
- Cover of the Year for Deluged published by The New Yorker, awarded by The American Society of Magazine Editors (2006)
- Art Directors Club, Hall of Fame (2012)
- Work showcased at the Norman Rockwell Museum in Stockbridge, Massachusetts, the Royal Ontario Museum and the Museum of American Illustration in New York

== Controversy ==
Blitt's 2008 New Yorker cover depicting Michelle and Barack Obama standing in the Oval Office was labeled "tasteless and offensive" by Obama campaign spokesman Bill Burton. A campaign spokesman for Senator John McCain also condemned the art. In the cover art, Obama is shown wearing traditional Muslim clothes, including sandals, robe, and turban. His wife Michelle is shown dressed in camouflage, combat boots and has an assault rifle over her shoulder. Behind them, an American flag is burning in the fireplace. Titled The Politics of Fear, the cover satirized the rumors about Obama and his wife as he ran for the presidency.

The controversial art was covered by numerous media outlets, including the Los Angeles Times, PBS, the Houston Chronicle, and others. In defense of the art, Eric Bates of Rolling Stone was quoted as saying, "I don't think it (The New Yorker) crossed the line. I would question whether there's much of a line to be crossed. I think their intent was clear, but I think it's clear from the response that a lot of people didn't get the joke." The New York Times called it the most memorable image of the 2008 presidential campaign, and Françoise Mouly, the Art Editor of the New Yorker, said she was "extremely proud" of the piece. Regarding the controversy, Blitt was quoted as saying "Anytime I produce a cover, I always regret it afterward".

The cover art was parodied later the same year by Entertainment Weekly, with a photograph by Jake Chessum featuring Jon Stewart and Stephen Colbert.

In spite of the controversy and condemnation by the Obama campaign, after taking office President Barack Obama chose one of Blitt's New Yorker covers to hang in the White House. The cover depicts the President picking the family dog at the same time as he is vetting candidates for his national security cabinet. Additionally, President Obama requested and received a signed New Yorker cover by the artist, which depicts the President walking on water.

== Bibliography ==
- Blitt, Barry (June 29, 2015). "Paint by number". Sketchbook. The New Yorker. 91 (18): 43.
- — (2017). Blitt. New York: Riverhead Books.
- — (September 21, 2020). "Starting work on the Joe Biden Presidential Library". Sketchbook. The New Yorker. 96 (28): 40.
- — (August 22, 2022). "Saul Goodman takes on his sleaziest client yet". Sketchbook. The New Yorker. 98 (25): 21.

Children's book illustrator

- Kloske, Geoffrey & Barry Blitt (2005). Once upon a time, the end : asleep in 60 seconds. New York: Atheneum Books for Young Readers.
- The 39 Apartments of Ludwig Van Beethoven by Jonah Winter, Schwartz & Wade (2006)
- What's the Weather Inside? by Karma Wilson, Simon & Schuster (2009)
- The Adventures of Mark Twain by Huckleberry Finn by Robert Burleigh, Simon & Schuster (2011)
- George Washington's Birthday (a mostly true tale) by Margaret McNamara, Random House (2012)
- The Founding Fathers!Those Horse-Ridin', Fiddle-Playin', Book-Readin', Gun-Totin' Gentlemen Who Started America by Jonah Winter Simon & Schuster (2015)

Book illustrator

- Baby's First Tattoo: A Memory Book for Modern Parents by Jim Mullen, Simon & Schuster (2002)
- Peculiar Questions and Practical Answers by the New York Public Library, St. Martin's Griffin (2019)

Magazine covers

- Mouly, Françoise (2012). Blown covers. New York: Abrams.

== Personal life ==
Blitt currently resides in Connecticut His younger brother, Ricky Blitt, is a screenwriter, based in West Hollywood.

Blitt is married to Angie Silverstein.
