= Black Leopard, Red Wolf =

2019 novel by Marlon James

- First edition
- Author: Marlon James
- Audio read by: Dion Graham
- Cover artist: Pablo Gerardo Camacho
- Language: English
- Series: Dark Star Trilogy #1
- Genre: Dark Fantasy
- Publisher: Riverhead Books
- Publication date: February 5, 2019
- Publication place: United States
- Media type: Print, ebook, audiobook
- Pages: 620 pp
- ISBN: 9780735220171
- OCLC: 1047524543
- Dewey Decimal: 813.6
- LC Class: PR9265.9.J358 B58 2019
- Followed by: Moon Witch, Spider King

Black Leopard, Red Wolf is a 2019 fantasy novel by Jamaican writer Marlon James. It is the first book of the Dark Star Trilogy. The novel draws on African history and mythology, blended into the landscape of the North Kingdom and the South Kingdom, and the political tensions between these two warring states, as well as various city-states and tribes in the surrounding landscape. The rights to produce a film adaptation were purchased by Michael B. Jordan in February 2019 prior to release of the book.

== Plot ==
The plot is narrated in flashbacks with non-chronological episodes. In a frame story, a man named Tracker recounts his tale to prison interrogators from the South Kingdom. Once Tracker has identified someone’s scent, he can follow them anywhere. As a young adult, he abandons his abusive grandfather, whom he believes is his father, and returns to the Ku tribe, home of his uncle and his extended family, where he learns of his deceased father and of his brother, also now dead. He meets a shapeshifter known as Leopard and a young Ku man named Kava, with whom Tracker begins a sexual relationship. They rescue mingi children, who are born with birth defects and/or strange powers. These children are cared for by the Sangoma, an anti-witch.

On one mission to rescue children, Tracker is caught by a flesh-eating monster named Asanbosam. He and Leopard kill the creature and escape. Kava betrays the Sangoma. She and most of the children are killed, but she is able to place a protective enchantment on Tracker before she dies. Tracker leaves the surviving mingi children with the Gangatom tribe and sets out on his own.

Years later, in the city of Malakal, Tracker is hired to find a mysterious boy. The boy was abducted from the home of Basu Fumanguru, an elder in the city of Kongor. Basu and his family were all killed, and the boy is the sole survivor. He is now being held captive by a group of monsters. His captors include an Ipundulu, a vampire who drains his victims and replaces their blood with lightning, as well as Sasabonsam, brother of Asambosam. In addition to Tracker, members of this expedition include Leopard; Leopard’s bowman and lover Fumeli; Nyka, a man who previously betrayed Tracker by selling him into slavery; Nsaka, a mercenary and Nyka’s lover; Sadogo, a giant; Bunshi, a river spirit; and Sogolon, the Moon Witch, a sorceress who is hunted by the spirits of those she has killed.

The expedition falls apart almost immediately. Nsaka and Nyka leave the group early. The remaining group members survive a trip through the Darklands, a forest where time flows abnormally. They reunite in the city of Kongor. Tracker and a city prefect named Mossi learn that the boy is the son of Lissisolo, King Kwash Dara’s sister, and thus the true heir to the throne. The boy’s captors are using the nineteen doors, magical portals, to traverse the North Kingdom. Kwash Dara and his necromancer the Aesi want to kill the child to protect their claim to the throne.

Tracker, Mossi, Sogolon, Sadogo, and Venin (a young girl rescued by Sogolon) travel to the city of Dolingo to intercept the boy and his captors. Sogolon betrays the three men by selling them into slavery. Amidst a slave rebellion, the group loses track of the boy. The boy reaches one of the nineteen doors and returns to Kongor. Venin, possessed by one of the spirits hunting Sogolon, drags her through the portal and seemingly kills her. The group returns to Kongor. Along the way, Tracker and Mossi begin a sexual relationship. They reunite with Leopard and Fumeli. Nsaka and Nyka are also in the city; Nyka has been drained by the Ipundulu. The group rescues the boy and kills the Ipundulu, but Sasabonsam escapes. Lissisolo is taken hostage by the Aesi. Bunshi, Sadogo, and the Aesi are killed. Lissisolo takes her son to the Mweru wilderness. Mossi and Tracker return for the mingi children; they raise them together in the city of Mitu.

Five years later, Sasabonsam has again captured the boy, although Tracker suspects that the boy went with the monster willingly. Sasabonsam and the boy attack the home in Mitu while Tracker is away, killing Mossi and the mingi children. Tracker finds Nyka, who has killed Nsaka and become an Ipundulu himself. The boy is now addicted to vampire blood, so Tracker plans to use Nyka to draw him out of hiding. They work with the Aesi, who has somehow survived the previous fight. Eventually, they kill Sasabonsam. They find the boy waiting with Leopard and Sogolon. Leopard tries to kill the boy, but Sogolon kills Leopard first. Nyka kills both himself and the boy with lightning. Tracker wanders to the Southern Kingdom, where he is arrested. He ends his tale by asking if his testimony matches Sogolon’s.

== Themes ==
Themes that the novel explores include the fundamentals of truths, the limits of power, the excesses of ambition, desire, Machiavellianism, duty and honor. James offers a clue to his underlying theme early on in the saga: "Truth eats lies just as the crocodile eats the moon."

=== Meaning ===
The novel's extensive exploration of meaning informs its linguistic and narrative structure and has led it to be generally considered a difficult text; Jia Tolentino noted that "nearly every bit of dialogue is immediately challenged by another character." Tracker frequently challenges the authority of the inquisitor and deliberately misleads him; his account begins with a story for which he provides two possible endings.

James sets the conventions of the secondary-world novel, (Note: John Clute argues in The Encyclopedia of Fantasy that Tolkien's abiding principle as a creator of secondary worlds was that "external descriptions or verifications of a secondary world, or the nature of any route into a secondary world, must be extrinsic to the reader's belief in that world.") in which the "real world" is escaped and hence in which stories are vitally important, against the Tracker's nihilist philosophy, which governs the novel and which ultimately rejects stories as fundamentally flawed ways of apprehending the world. Gautam Bhatia argues that the extent to which the novel "denies us refuge in meaning" makes it unprecedented in epic fantasy.

=== Queer sexuality ===
The book is pervaded by queerness; the integral role of shoga men in Tracker's society is referred to early. James, when writing Tracker's relationships, attempted to "separate masculinity from sexuality": both Tracker and the Leopard are gay, and their relationship, though non-sexual, is "charged in a way that is comprehensible only within a worldview where" queerness is fundamental. Several writers have noted that the book's frank portrayal of sex ("really aggressive queerness") is continuous from James's previous work as well, which treats masculinity as "a wide, complex spectrum."

James has commented that the pervasive queerness of the book is an accurate depiction of Africa before the influence of evangelical Christianity.

== Development ==
James conceived the idea for the book long before his reception of the 2015 Man Booker Prize for his novel A Brief History of Seven Killings; he has repeatedly expressed his desire to build a "vast playground of [African] myth and history and legend that other people can draw from," analogously to J. R. R. Tolkien's similar efforts for Britain. His research, which began "in August 2015," two months before he won the Booker, took two years and was largely focused on the condition of "the pre-Christian, pre-Islam, original African religious Africa." The cultures which James principally drew on were "central and west African with a bit from the east"; the cultures of the Omo valley informed the Ku and Gangatom villages, and West African empires (Mali, Songhai, and Ghana) were the inspiration for the book's depiction of cities.

James has acknowledged his debt to the fluid nature of African oral storytelling and poetry, celebrating "the whole idea that nothing is fixed in this universe"; the implications of the unreliability of the narrator in traditional Anansi stories, he argues, "[are] not just shifting truth, it’s shifting shape, it’s shifting identity, it’s shifting sexual preference." In addition, he has noted that the idea of "an authentic story" or "director's cut" is alien to African storytelling, in which multiple versions of the same story may be given equal weight.

He began writing after a conversation with Melina Matsoukas, who mentioned the television series The Affair, in which both halves of a troubled couple remember their affair in subtly different ways; James intends the Dark Star trilogy to comprise three characters' conflicting accounts of the same events; the sequel, Moon Witch, Spider King, is the witch Sogolon's account. James completed approximately one hundred pages of the novel before the end of the fall semester in 2016, having begun writing at the beginning of the semester.

Before the book's release, James referred to the planned trilogy as "African Game of Thrones". He later said that the description was a joke, although he does not regret the comparison, commenting that both series retain supernatural elements while telling "decidedly adult" stories.

=== Adaptation ===
Michael B. Jordan purchased the rights to produce a film adaptation of the novel in February 2019. James has expressed curiosity about a potential adaptation, noting that "our cinematic language of sci-fi and fantasy is still very European—particularly fantasy. And Black Leopard, Red Wolf is not even remotely European."

== Reception ==
The style of the book has been much praised by reviewers, variously hymned as "a voice of almost overwhelming confidence, earthiness, and brio," one of "beautiful flexibility," and an "adroit mingling of ancient and modern tones." Many have commented on the book's place in the tradition of linguistically daring post-colonial literature; Bhatia has argued that the book's language, unusual for epic fantasy, can be made sense of only when this struggle with a colonial language is accounted for, comparing James's situation to the self-expressed plight of Dambudzo Marechera: "For a black writer the language is very racist; you have to have harrowing fights and hair-raising panga duels with the language before you can make it do all that you want it to do."

James's unsparing depiction of violence was much discussed; Bhatia remarked that the book "should come along with multiple trigger warnings for rape, bestiality, dismemberment, mutilation, and sudden and violent death." Some interviewers noted that this was a theme continuous from James's previous work, particularly Brief History. James has repeatedly contended that to separate violence and the resultant suffering is distasteful; he remarked that "if you don’t read the scene of the murder of a child and find it unbearable, then that scene failed."

Amal El-Mohtar said that comparisons to J.R.R. Tolkien and George R. R. Martin "are wildly inaccurate to the experience of reading this book," describing it as "more like if Toni Morrison had written Ovid's Metamorphoses."

The book was named one of the top ten books of 2019 by The Washington Post.

== Awards ==
In October 2019 Black Leopard, Red Wolf was named a finalist in the National Book Award for Fiction. It won the 2019 the Ray Bradbury Prize, one of the Los Angeles Times Book Prizes. It also won the 2020 Locus Award for Best Horror Novel.

Awards for Black Leopard, Red Wolf
Year	Award	Category	Result	Ref.
2019	Foyles Books of the Year	Fiction	Shortlisted	
2019	Goodreads Choice Award	Fantasy	Shortlisted	
2019	Los Angeles Times Book Prize	Ray Bradbury Prize	Won	
2019	National Book Award	Fiction	Shortlisted	
2020	American Book Award	—	Shortlisted	
2020	American Library Association's Over the Rainbow Book List	—	Top	
2020	Audie Award	Fiction	Shortlisted	
2020	Lambda Literary Award	Science Fiction, Fantasy and Horror	Shortlisted	
2020	Locus Award	Horror Novel	Won	
2020	Minnesota Book Award	Genre Fiction	Won	
2020	Leopardo negro, lobo rojo Premios Kelvin Award with Javier Calvo (trans)	Mejor Novela Traducida (Translated Novel)	Shortlisted	

== Sequels ==
The sequel, Moon Witch, Spider King, was released on February 15, 2022; it is narrated in-universe by the witch Sogolon. The third volume will tentatively be titled White Wing, Dark Star. The titles were initially given as Moon Witch, Night Devil and The Boy and the Dark Star. In 2019, James described the plan of the trilogy: "this one is more picaresque, adventure, odyssey. The second one is probably more historical, magical realist. And the third one is gonna be mostly horror."
