= Ascension (Binge novel) =

2023 novel by Nicholas Binge

- Dust cover of the first US edition, 2023
- Author: Nicholas Binge
- Language: English
- Genre: Science fiction
- Publisher: Harper Voyager / Riverhead Books
- Publication date: 2023
- Publication place: United States / United Kingdom
- Media type: Print (hardback & paperback), Audiobook, Ebook
- Pages: 352
- ISBN: 978-0008505813
- Preceded by: Professor Everywhere
- Followed by: Dissolution

Ascension is a 2023 novel by Nicholas Binge, published in the UK by Harper Voyager, and in the US by Riverhead Books. It is published or forthcoming in twelve languages, and a film adaptation is in development. The novel tells the story of Harold Tunmore, a physicist, who joins a team to climb a mountain that has appeared in the middle of the Pacific Ocean.

The book was nominated for the 2023 Goodreads Choice Awards and the 2024 Premio Ignotus.

== Synopsis ==
The book opens with a frame narrative and a fictional 'foreword' from Ben Tunmore. He describes how his brother Harold went missing without a trace decades before, only to turn up as an old man in a psychiatric facility in the UK. Harold is scarred both physically and mentally and speaks nonsensically about things that Ben cannot understand. Ben finds a collection of letters in a briefcase written by Harold to his niece, Ben's daughter Harriet. Harold then commits suicide by setting himself on fire. The rest of the narrative is told primarily through these letters.

In the letters, Harold describes being recruited by a shadowy military organisation for a secret mission by a man who refers to himself as The Warden. He is shown an old friend and colleague who claims to be able to see the future and when he talks to this friend it is clear that he is mentally unwell. His friend shoots himself in the head. When Harold presses as to where his friend had been, The Warden says that he must join the expedition to find out. He also learns that his ex-wife Naoko will be there too.

He boards a plane that flies over the Pacific Ocean and eventually comes across the mountain: it is impossibly tall — taller than Everest — and it has appeared out of nowhere just months previously. Harold discovers that he is part of a second expedition to climb the mountain and discover its secrets. The first all died, with the exception of Naoko, who appears to have gone mad.

A diverse crew of scientists are put together led by a soldier and mountaineer Roger Bettan. They begin to climb the mountain and encounter strange anomalies. Harold sees people's faces change, as if they are de-aging. Time becomes elastic. He begins to see visions on the ice.

In the night, they are attacked by a giant octopus creature and one of the crew - Jet - is severely injured and appears to be affected mentally as well. Harold follows Jet, along with fellow crew member Polya, into a portal that sends them into a cave system beneath the mountain. This is where the octopus creatures live.

He discovers that they worship some a deity and see this mountain as their rightful home. They do not want the humans there. The octopus creatures call themselves the Leviathans and through their hive mind, they are able to exert emotional control over the crew and Jet is becoming increasingly lost to them. They discover a map of the portals and cave system, which Polya photographs, but Jet discovers and murders Polya. Harold just barely escapes.

Upon return to the camp, Harold reveals that he believes the mountain is a tesseract, a four-dimensional structure in spacetime, which is what allows them to move around it in time and space. He tells the others, who are growing increasingly paranoid, that there might be a way to the surface through the portals. More of the crew are dying, either from altitude sickness or being attacked.

In their final push, they ascend the mountain through the portals, but are attacked once again. Most of the crew die. In order to not be overcome by the mental power of the Leviathans, Harold must come to terms with what happened between him, Naoko, and his adopted son Santi many years ago.

Only Harold and Bettan make it to the summit, where they discover that fellow crew member Neil has been one of the deities the Leviathans worship all this time. He tells them that the mountain has been a test, set for humankind periodically through history, and they have passed it and are ready for the next stage of the evolution. Bettan accepts the next stage of evolution, but then proceeds to shoot himself in the head because he refuses to have his destiny decided for him. The mountain disappears and Harold is transported back to England.

In the afterword, written by Ben Tunmore, he explains that much analysis has been made of the letters since they were published, and it is left ambiguous whether what happened was just a creation of Harold's mind to deal with the trauma of losing his son or if it was real.

== Critical reception ==
Reviews of Ascension were largely favourable. A starred review from Publishers Weekly called it "incredible" and "pitch-perfect", saying that Binge "elevates this above similar genre fiction." The Booklist review referenced both Bram Stoker and H.P. Lovecraft, saying that "Binge earns his place among these literary lights with an expert story of creeping dread and cosmological horror."

It was selected as a New York Times 'Editor's Choice Pick', with Lincoln Michel praising "Binge's crisp prose [which] moves well between science fiction concepts, Gothic terror and fast-paced action sequences."

Additionally, The Wall Street Journal wrote that "'Ascension' is thoroughly recommended—a macabre, escapist pleasure for the thoughtful set" and The Washington Post said that "Binge's eerie speculative thriller looks both outward at the edges of scientific understanding, and inward at the meaning of responsibility, remorse and the human capacity for salvaging mercy from tragedy."

In the UK, the Financial Times called it "A vertiginous tale of discovery, horror and weird, time-bending phenomena". However, the Kirkus review was less positive, calling it an "entertaining SF thriller that's unable to catch up to its vision."

Since release, Ascension was named as one of Vulture's "Best Books of 2023", and has appeared in the Los Angeles Times "Best Tech Books of 2023", The Financial Times' "Best Summer Books of 2023" and was picked by Goodreads as one of "The Top New Sci-Fi Books of the Past Three Years".

The Spanish translation, published by Ediciones Minotauro, hit #5 on the national bestseller lists in Spain.
