= Dissolution (Binge novel) =

2025 novel by Nicholas Binge

- Dust cover of first US edition, 2025
- Author: Nicholas Binge
- Language: English
- Genre: Science fiction
- Publisher: Harper Voyager / Riverhead Books
- Publication date: 2025
- Publication place: United States / United Kingdom
- Media type: Print (hardback & paperback), Audiobook, Ebook
- Pages: 384
- ISBN: 978-0593852163
- Preceded by: Ascension
- Followed by: Extremity

Dissolution is a 2025 science fiction novel by Nicholas Binge, published in the UK by Harper Voyager, and in the US by Riverhead Books. It is published or forthcoming in multiple languages, including Spanish, German, Hungarian, and Arabic. The novel tells the story of Margaret (Maggie) Webb, who discovers that her husband Stanley’s Alzheimer’s is a false cover for the fact that his memories are being purposefully erased to keep something he did in his past hidden. The book alternates between Maggie and Stanley’s perspectives as they move through multiple decades of their relationship.

== Synopsis ==
The story opens with Maggie Webb, an eighty-three-year-old woman, being interrogated in what looks like an empty swimming pool by a man named Hassan, who is prompting her to recall the events of the past few days. In her recollection, she tells of the first time Hassan arrived at her door, telling her that her husband Stanley’s Alzheimer’s is a cover to hide the fact that his memories are being removed. Hassan prompts her to help break Stanley out of the memory ward that he has been unwittingly imprisoned in and take him to the mysterious Lazarus Institute — a facility in London where Stanley once worked.

Once there, Hassan introduces Maggie to the memory spade, a piece of technology designed to allow people to enter the memories of others. Maggie enters Stanley’s mind to try and find whatever it is that others are trying to bury. Hassan insists that the fate of the world relies on her doing so, but also suggests if she’s able to find the answer, she may be able to reverse the memory loss and get her husband back.

Meanwhile, the narrative also explores Stanley’s youth from his perspective. Escaping from a broken home, he arrives as a scholarship student at the illustrious Whelton College, where he feels deeply out of place. He is inducted into the chess and memory club of the blind and esoteric Professor Waldman, along with two students named Jacques and Raph. Together, they train their memories and play chess against one another, forming a tight bond. As they grow up, Professor Waldman introduces Stanley to his life’s work: unlocking perfect, objective recall. But before they can complete it, Waldman takes his own life and leaves an ominous note warning Stanley away. Some years later, Stanley reunites with Jacques and Raph and they continue the research.

In the present day, Maggie begins to explore Stanley’s memories and finds strange inconsistencies that don’t quite match up with Hassan’s explanation of events. At certain points, a strange black phenomenon appears and erases the memory around her, and she is forced to exit the memory spade. When she visits her own wedding day, young Stanley isolates a cabin in the woods and talks to her present eighty-three-year-old self. Two things become clear: one, the memory spade doesn’t just let you see someone else’s memories, it lets you travel in time and engage with the past; two, the Hassan in Maggie’s present is actually Jacques from the past who has somehow unnaturally extended his life. Maggie learns that the force deleting memories is, in fact, a supernatural entity they have labelled Omega, a fail-safe to stop people from travelling in time and playing with the past. Hassan believes that Stanley has the key to stopping Omega, and presses Maggie to find it out, his earlier pleas turning to violent threats. He has also used the time-travelling technology to develop a device he calls the ‘Dissolution Engine’, which allows him to loop short moments in time until he can get what he wants.

In trying to save Stanley and keep the answers from Hassan, Maggie realises she herself is stuck in a dissolution loop, and that Hassan has played this scenario through with her hundreds of times, trying to find the right one. In an act of rebellion, she stabs Hassan in the eye with a needle and slices his throat — though these do not kill him — and escapes to the basement of the Lazarus Institute to unleash Omega for good. We return to where we were at the start of the novel, the empty swimming pool a protective cage from the unleashed force, and Hassan pressing Maggie for the way out. She realises there is no way out that can save her or Stanley, but decides that she can happily wait out Hassan forever, as she will be living in a loop of her favourite memories forever.

== Critical reception ==
Reviews of Dissolution have been positive, with it having been selected as a best book of 2025 by both The New York Times and Esquire Magazine.

It received a starred review from Library Journal, describing it as “A mind-blowing science-fiction novel that plumbs the edges of memory and time.” Both Booklist and Kirkus compared the book to the work of Philip K. Dick, the latter commenting that the story “twists and turns like a spacecraft in a wormhole, rocketing toward an unforeseeable and unresolved ending."

On release in the US, the New York Times highlighted it as one of the month’s best thrillers, calling it “suspenseful, provocative and surprisingly tender.” In the UK, The Herald said that "this mindbender is a genuinely gripping work of speculative fiction”, New Scientist praised it as “an expertly crafted puzzle of a story” and, writing for The Guardian, sci-fi and fantasy columnist Lisa Tuttle called it a “twisty, absorbing thriller [that] is both a moving love story and fascinating speculative fiction exploring memory, time and reality.”

== Film adaptation ==
In 2024, Deadline Hollywood announced that an adaptation of the book was in development at Sony Pictures in association with Temple Hill Entertainment, with Oscar-nominated Eric Heisserer penning the script.
