= John Crow's Devil =

Book by Marlon James

- First edition
- Author: Marlon James
- Language: English
- Genre: Fiction
- Set in: 1957 Jamaica
- Publisher: Akashic Books
- Publication date: 2005
- Publication place: United States
- Media type: Print, e-book, audiobook
- Pages: 226 pp
- ISBN: 9781888451825; 1st paperback
- OCLC: 255009594
- LC Class: PR9265.9.J358 J64 2005
- Followed by: The Book of Night Women

John Crow's Devil is the 2005 debut novel by author Marlon James. The book was first published by Akashic Books in New York. The story is set in 1957 in the fictional town of Gibbeah, Jamaica, where two men fight to be the town's singular religious leader. James portrays the fight between the two men as a struggle between good and evil and incorporates magical realism, with miracles woven into the plot, similar.

== Synopsis ==
Hector Bligh is a preacher in the small Jamaican town of Gibbeah, where his public struggles with alcoholism have earned him the nickname The Rum Preacher. Bligh's congregation tolerates his misbehavior, while Bligh overlooks the sins and stray paths of his congregants.

This unspoken agreement is broken when a fire-and-brimstone preacher, Apostle York, abruptly appears during mass one day. York violently removes Bligh from the Pulpit and savagely beats him.

While Bligh recovers under the care of a villager, York assumes Bligh's congregation, residence, and church. The congregation is drawn to York's lead as he fills the spiritual vacuum left by Bligh's vacant and soft-hearted ministry. Bligh returns to the church only to find that his congregation no longer wants him and York is willing to resort to violence to repel him.

The story follows the two men as their conflict grows to biblical proportions.

== Reception ==
The New York Times Book Review states that: "Writing with assurance and control, James uses his small-town drama to suggest the larger anguish of a postcolonial society struggling for its own identity. But he mixes this with an evocation of a cultlike religious fervor that recalls the People's Temple and the Jonestown massacre of the 1970's." In a 2015 review, The Independent wrote that the novel is "undoubtedly breathtaking for its imagination and its storytelling, its 78 rejections mystifying, but there seems to be a baroque, spectacular side to the darkness."

== See also ==
Subsequent novels by Marlon James:

- The Book of Night Women (2009)
- A Brief History of Seven Killings (2014)
