= Lightning bird =

Legendary creature in the folklore of the tribes of South Africa

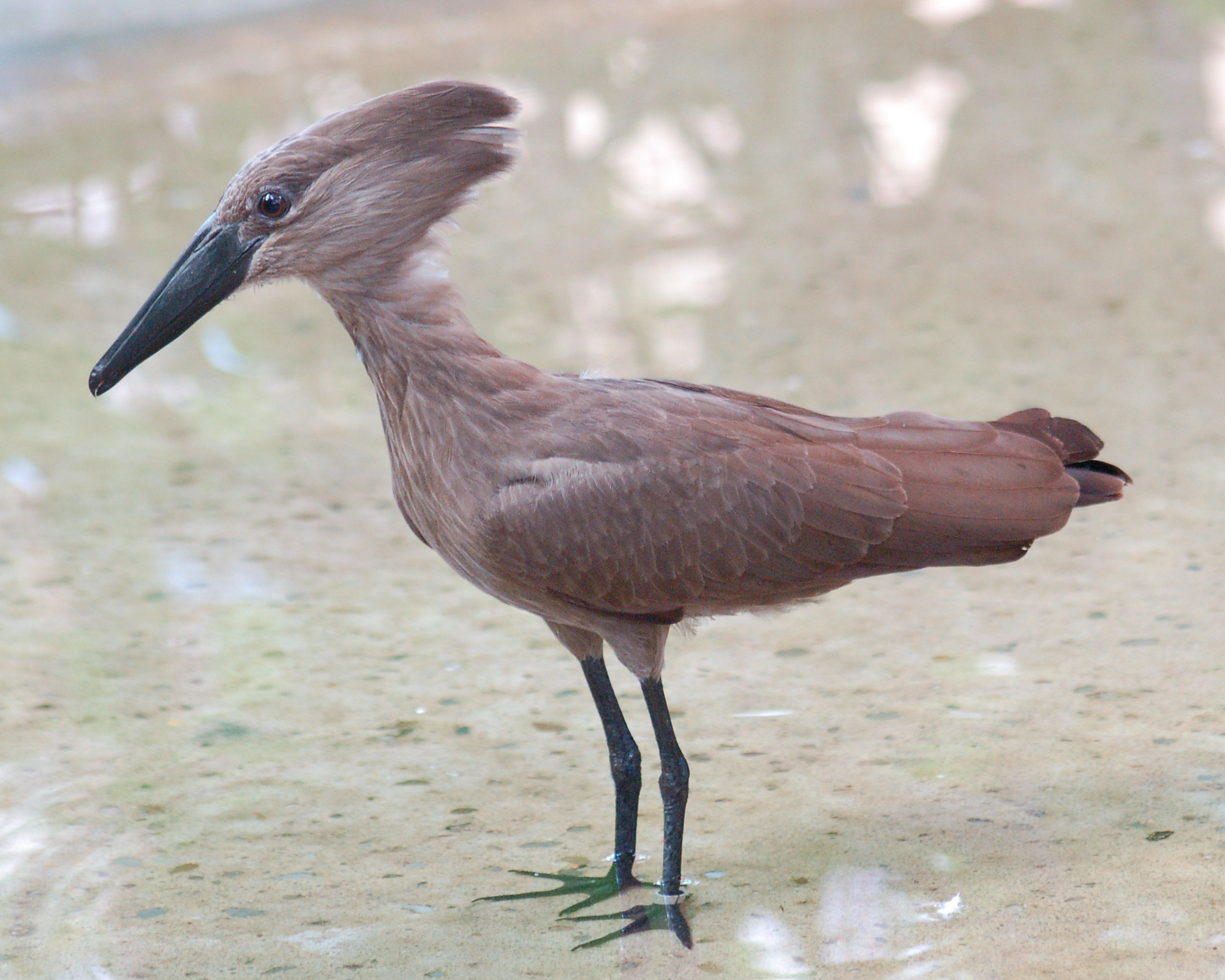
- The hamerkop, a bird believed to be a manifestation of the creature

Creature information
- Grouping: Mythical creature
- Sub grouping: Flying animal

Origin
- Country: South Africa

The lightning bird or impundulu or thekwane (or izulu, inyoni yezulu) is a creature in the folklore of the Zulu people.

The impundulu (which translates as "lightning bird") takes the form of a black and white bird, the size of a person, which is said to summon thunder and lightning with its wings and talons. It is a vampiric creature associated with witchcraft, often the servant or familiar of a witch or witch doctor, which attacks the witch's enemies. It is said to have an insatiable appetite for blood. Sometimes it takes the form of a beautiful young man who seduces women.

== The bird ==
Among certain African tribes the hammerkop is believed to be the lightning bird. Among others the lightning bird is believed to manifest itself only through lightning, except to women, to whom it reveals itself as a bird. In these instances the bird is of imaginary nature and may take several forms. In one instance a village girl described a black rooster-like bird that ran up her hoe and left claw marks on her body before it flew back to the clouds. In other instances it is described as having iridescent feathers like a peacock's or a fiery red tail, bill and legs. Most supposed sightings describe the lightning bird as a winged creature with the size of a person; when needed it can indeed masquerade as a human, but usually it's a huge black and white bird of prey.

== Powers ==
The fat of the bird is believed to be of significance either as the fuel that the bird sets on fire when it throws down a lightning strike or as a component in valuable traditional medicine. The fat is believed to be procured by catching the bird at the moment when the lightning strikes the ground, or by digging the bird up from an underground cavity at the spot. The bird is furthermore believed to lay a large egg underground at the location of the lightning strike. This may be a good or bad omen that may require digging to procure or dispose of the eggs. This creature has another similarity to vampires, it is said that the lightning bird is immortal, because it outlives its masters. Legend recounts that the bird is passed down in a witch's family from mother to daughter, doing the bidding of its owner, and the impundulu has only one known weakness. The lightning bird is impervious to gunshots or stabbing, it cannot be poisoned or drowned, but it is said that the creature can be destroyed by fire.

== Cultural significance ==
In most instances the tribe's witch doctor plays the essential role in dealing with the lightning bird. A supposed extract from the bird's flesh may for instance be prepared into a remedy for tracing thieves. In this way the witch doctors may exert control over the minds of both law-abiding and criminal members of their society. The impundulu is known to be a confidant of witches, it's sometimes spotted riding on the back of a hyena, because witches can turn themselves into a hyena. The lightning bird is widely feared as a witch's familiar. It is considered an evil creature because it does the bidding of witches. If a witch doctor dispatches an impundulu, it can cause illness and bad luck to a person.

== Popular culture ==
An impundulu serves as a major antagonist in the Dark Star trilogy by Marlon James and appears in two books: Black Leopard, Red Wolf and Moon Witch, Spider King.

== Other vampire birds ==
Legend has it that the lightning bird is a vampire who feeds off blood, in human form it will feed off humans, but in animal form it will feed off other birds. This is similar to the vampire finch, which draws blood by pecking at the feather bases of sleeping sea birds, but the vampire finch is confined to the Galapagos islands. In Africa there is the red-billed oxpecker, these birds can be seen settling on cattle if they see fresh blood, so there are other examples of vampire birds but none as frightening as the impundulu.

In 2005, a South African man was convicted of culpable homicide after killing a two-year-old child he believed to be an impundulu.

== See also ==
- Chonchon
- Shtriga
- Tikoloshe
- Thunderbird (mythology)
