= The Book of Night Women =

2009 novel by Marlon James

- First US edition
- Author: Marlon James
- Cover artist: Marie-Guillemine Benoist
- Language: English
- Subject: Eighteenth century, slavery
- Genre: Fiction
- Published: 2009, Riverhead Books, North America; Oneworld Publications, UK/Australia/NZ
- Publication place: Jamaica, United States, United Kingdom/Australia
- Media type: Print, e-book, audiobook
- Pages: 417 pages
- ISBN: 1594488576 (North America); ISBN 9781780746524 (UK/Australia/NZ)

The Book of Night Women is a 2009 novel by Jamaican author Marlon James. The book was first published in hardback on February 19, 2009, by Riverhead Books. The story follows Lilith, a young woman born into slavery, who challenges the boundaries of what is expected of her.

In 2022, the novel was included on the "Big Jubilee Read" list of 70 books by Commonwealth authors, selected to celebrate the Platinum Jubilee of Elizabeth II.

== Synopsis ==
Lilith is a beautiful young woman born during the 18th century on a Jamaican sugar plantation. Orphaned from birth, she quickly learns that life as a slave can be frequently brutal and unkind. After she is forced to defend herself against a would-be rapist, she is sent to work in the plantation owner's house. There she tries to win the master's affections, despite warnings from a fellow slave that this will only end badly. From there, she is sent to live with the overseer of the plantation, and the two have an unconventional relationship. Lilith experiences more troubles when the Night Women, a group of female slaves planning a revolt, ask her to join in their plans.

== Themes ==
In The Book of Night Women, James challenges the traditional slave narrative by presenting a protagonist (Lilith) who approaches her enslavement with complex duality, despite the constant description of antagonism between slaves and masters on a plantation in Jamaica. She hates the masters, but much of the novel deals with how she "aspires to obtain a privileged stature within plantation society by submitting to the sexual subjugation of a white overseer, Robert Quinn". This is additionally challenged by Lilith and Robert's "love", leading the reader to question the limits of love and relationships. James seems to intend for readers to root for Robert and Lilith, but then catch themselves, as Robert Quinn has a reputation as a brutal, violent overseer—even ordering Lilith to be severely whipped. The situation for the reader is further complicated because Quinn is Irish, another population that was considered to be worth less than British white men. While this fact at times brings him sympathy from the reader, his whiteness overshadows his Irishness in most cases, but importantly complicates the power dynamics on the plantation.

Additionally, the novel explores the complexity of the many roles of women with some characters having deep connections to Obeah and Myal spiritualism. Obeah and Myal, although are often viewed as Jamaican religions, are not exclusive to Jamaica and are actually found in other parts of the Caribbean as well. These practices developed as a result of British colonialism and slavery in the British West Indies in the late 18th and 19th centuries. Obeah and Myal allowed slaves to connect to their religion to gain spiritual peace and strength. These forms of spirituality play a huge role on the female characters in the novel. The female slaves are portrayed as strong-willed and intelligent, while the male slaves are often portrayed as weak, thoughtless, and even traitorous. “Rape, torture, murder and other dehumanizing acts propel the narrative, never failing to shock in both their depravity and their humanness. It is this complex intertwining that makes James’s book so disturbing and so eloquent”. The novel "defies hegemonic notions of empire by pointing out the explosive and antagonistic relationship between colonizers and colonized." The antagonizing women in the novel are also complex—for example, Isobel, the master's white love interest and expected future wife, challenges the traditional, European ideals for womanhood. When she is acting in a manner contrary to those expectations, she is described as "Creole" and implying that she is something lesser than a European woman because she has lived in Jamaica. Therefore, the novel shows how, at this time, "hypersexual [was] synonymous with being Caribbean and inextricably related to being African." Marlon James explores how enslaved women and Caribbean women dealt with the constant sexualization and fetishization of their bodies and how they used their sexuality as a means of escapism. The novel not only explores the colonized/colonizer relationship, but also the power struggles involving other marginalized populations.

== Reception ==
Critical reception for The Book of Night Women was positive.

The New York Times praised the novel highly and stated that while its themes can make it difficult to read at times, this works in the book's favor as it is both disturbing and eloquent. The Los Angeles Times, who also praised the novel, commented on the scenes of brutality: "The novel can be unrelentingly violent, and the litany of terror, torture and revenge is long and horrifically detailed. But if that seems rather grim, it's nothing in comparison with how it must have been to the slaves." "Writing in the spirit of Toni Morrison and Alice Walker but in a style all his own, James has conducted an experiment in how to write the unspeakable — even the unthinkable. And the results of that experiment are an undeniable success."

=== Awards ===
Awards for The Book of Night Women
Year	Title	Award	Result	Ref.
2009	National Book Critics Circle Award	Fiction	Finalist	
2010	Dayton Literary Peace Prize	Fiction	Won	
2010	Minnesota Book Award	Novel & Short Story	Won	
2010	NAACP Image Award	Outstanding Literary Work – Fiction	Finalist	
