= Nicholas Binge =

British author

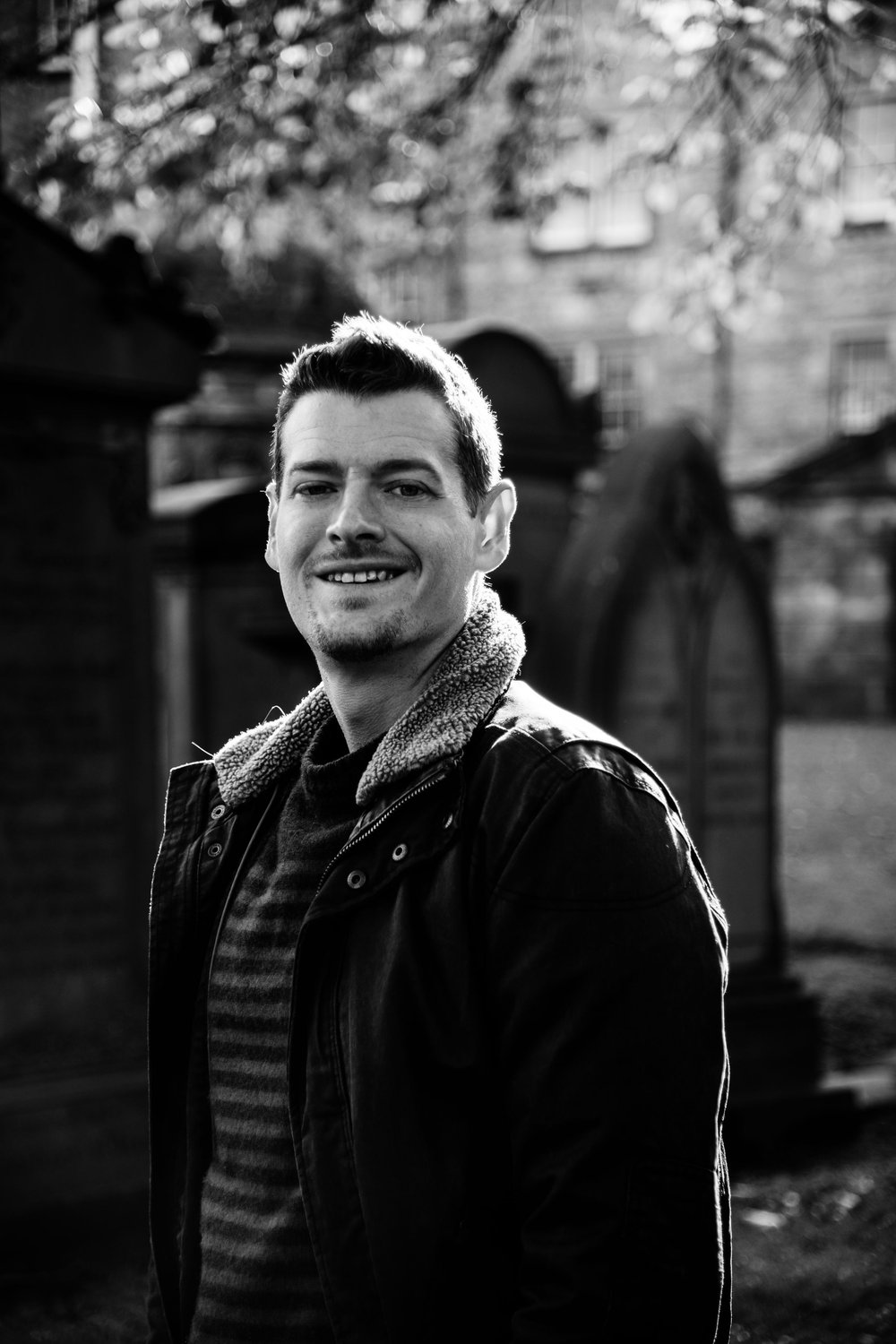
- Binge in 2022
- Born: 5 March 1990 (age 36); Singapore
- Occupation: Writer
- Writing career
- Language: English
- Genres: Science fiction, Horror
- Notable works: Ascension, Dissolution

Nicholas Binge is an author of science fiction and horror, and is a grandson of music composer Ronald Binge. He also writes crime fiction under the pseudonym Nick Brucker.

His works include the novels Ascension and Dissolution, as well as the novellas Extremity and Abyss. He has won or been nominated for the Proverse Prize for Fiction, the Goodreads Choice Awards, and the Premio Ignotus. His work has been translated into over twenty-five languages and he has multiple projects in development for film and television.

Binge was born in Singapore, and has lived in Switzerland, Hong Kong, and the UK. He currently lives in Edinburgh, Scotland, where he lectures in creative writing.

== Career ==
His first novel, Professor Everywhere, was selected as a prize-winner by the Proverse Prize for Literature in 2020. In 2023, his speculative thriller, Ascension, sold at auction to Harper Voyager in the UK, as well to Riverhead Books in the United States, as well as selling the translation rights into ten other territories. It was also optioned for a major motion picture.

His 2025 novel, Dissolution, released to critical acclaim from The New York Times, The Guardian, New Scientist, and more. It is being adapted into a major motion picture by Sony Pictures and Temple Hill Entertainment, with Oscar-nominated Eric Heisserer penning the adaptation.

As well as future novels from Harper Voyager UK / Riverhead Books, Binge sold two works to Tor, both releasing to critical acclaim in their respective genre spaces. The first, Extremity, published in October 2025 and was described by Fantasy Hive as "being easily in the running for the best novella of the year." The second, Abyss, was published under Tor's horror imprint Nightfire, and slated as "The horror book for our modern age" by Grimdark Magazine.

Under his pen name Nick Brucker, Binge sold the novel White Smoke, ‘a page-turning heist set among a group of duplicitous conmen and thieves, who are determined to steal the Vatican’s most remarkable treasures’, to Bonnier Books imprint Zaffre in early 2026 for six-figures at what was reported to be a highly competitive seven-publisher auction. It has since sold in at least 23 territories internationally for translation and Deadline reported that it was being adapted by A24 for a prestige television series with Benedict Cumberbatch producing and starring in a lead role.

In September 2026, Deadline also reported that he had sold a short story entitled Understudy to Netflix in a seven-figure deal, alongside Steven Yeun, and with Phil Lord & Chris Miller attached to produce and direct. Hollywood Reporter disclosed that the story was 23 pages, and that the story centers on an actor hired for a unique role in South Korea, before people start dying and a conspiracy unravels. It is understood that Binge has been attached to write the TV show himself.

His next published novel will be Exhumation, once again with Harper Voyager UK and Riverhead Books, in October 2026.

== Published Works ==
- 2020. Professor Everywhere. Proverse Hong Kong. ISBN 978-9888491858
- 2023. Ascension. Harper Voyager UK / Riverhead Books. ISBN 978-0008505813
- 2025. Dissolution. Harper Voyager UK / Riverhead Books. ISBN 978-0008668822
- 2025. Extremity. Tordotcom / Tor UK. ISBN 978-1035085866
- 2026. Abyss. Tor Nightfire / Tor UK. ISBN 978-1037402098
- 2026. Exhumation. Harper Voyager UK / Riverhead Books. ISBN 979-8217179183
- 2027. White Smoke. Bonnier Books UK
