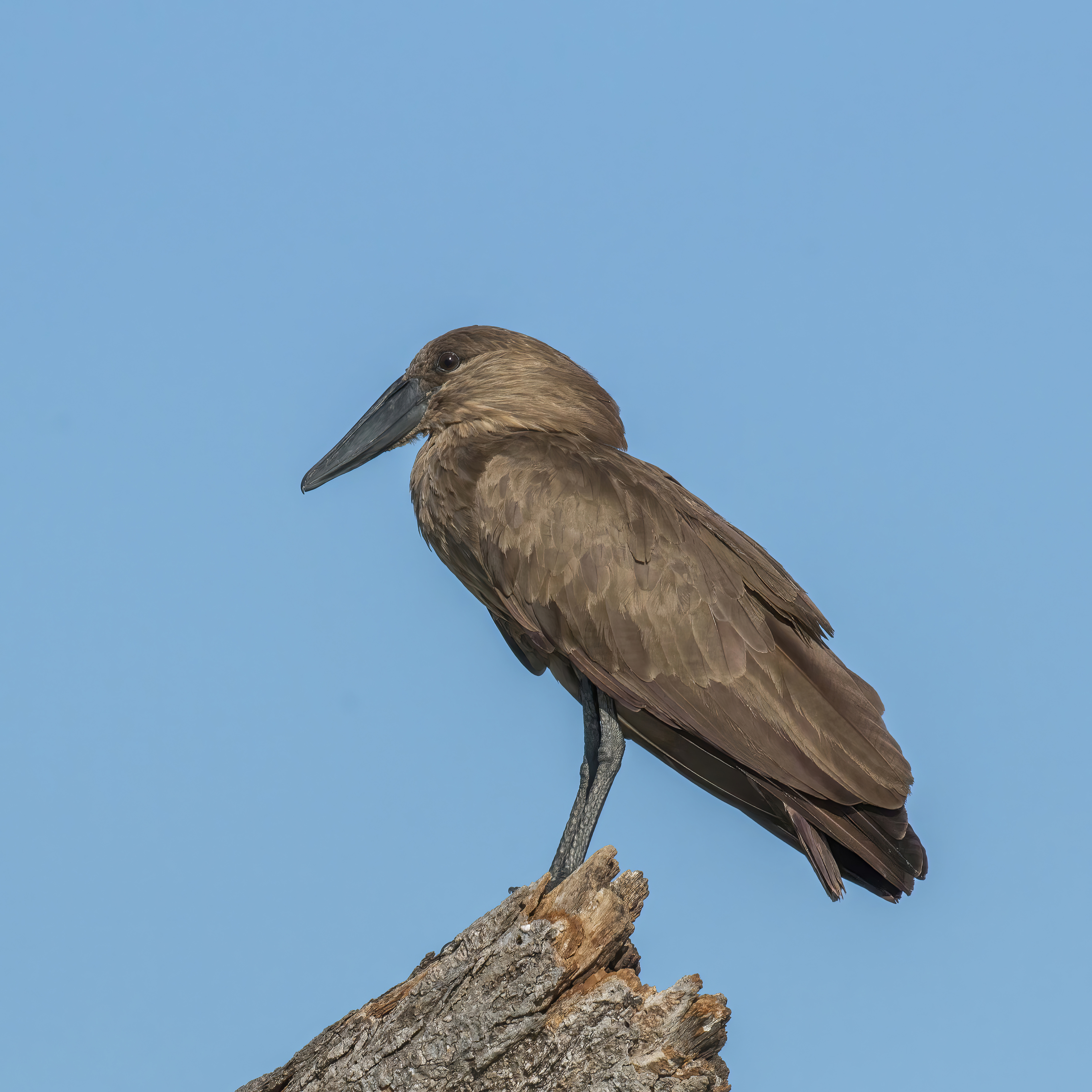
- In Kenya

Conservation status
- Least Concern (IUCN 3.1)

Scientific classification
- Kingdom: Animalia
- Phylum: Chordata
- Class: Aves
- Order: Pelecaniformes
- Family: Scopidae
- Genus: Scopus
- Species: S. umbretta

Binomial name
- Scopus umbretta Gmelin, 1789
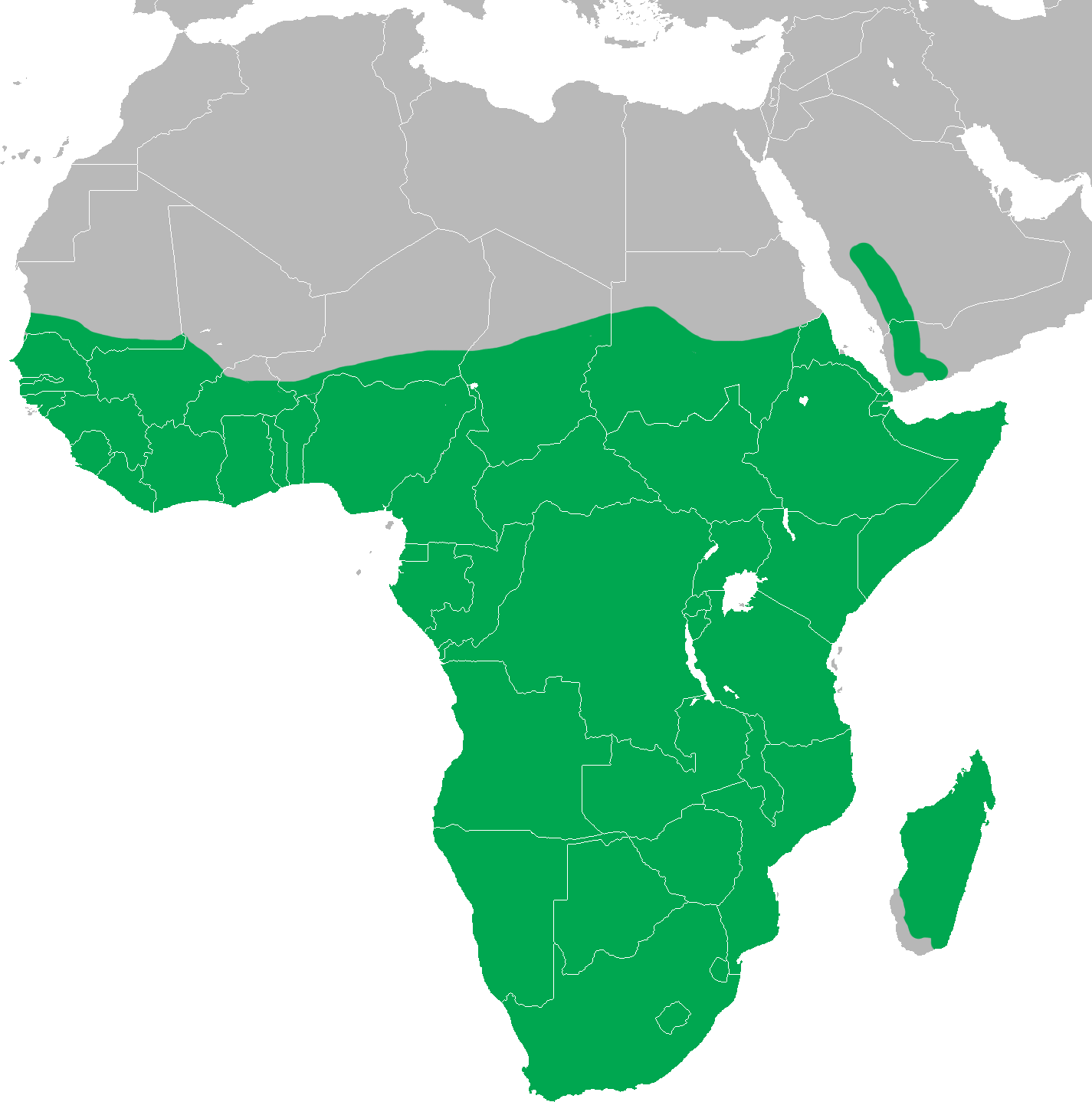
- native range

= Hamerkop =

Species of bird

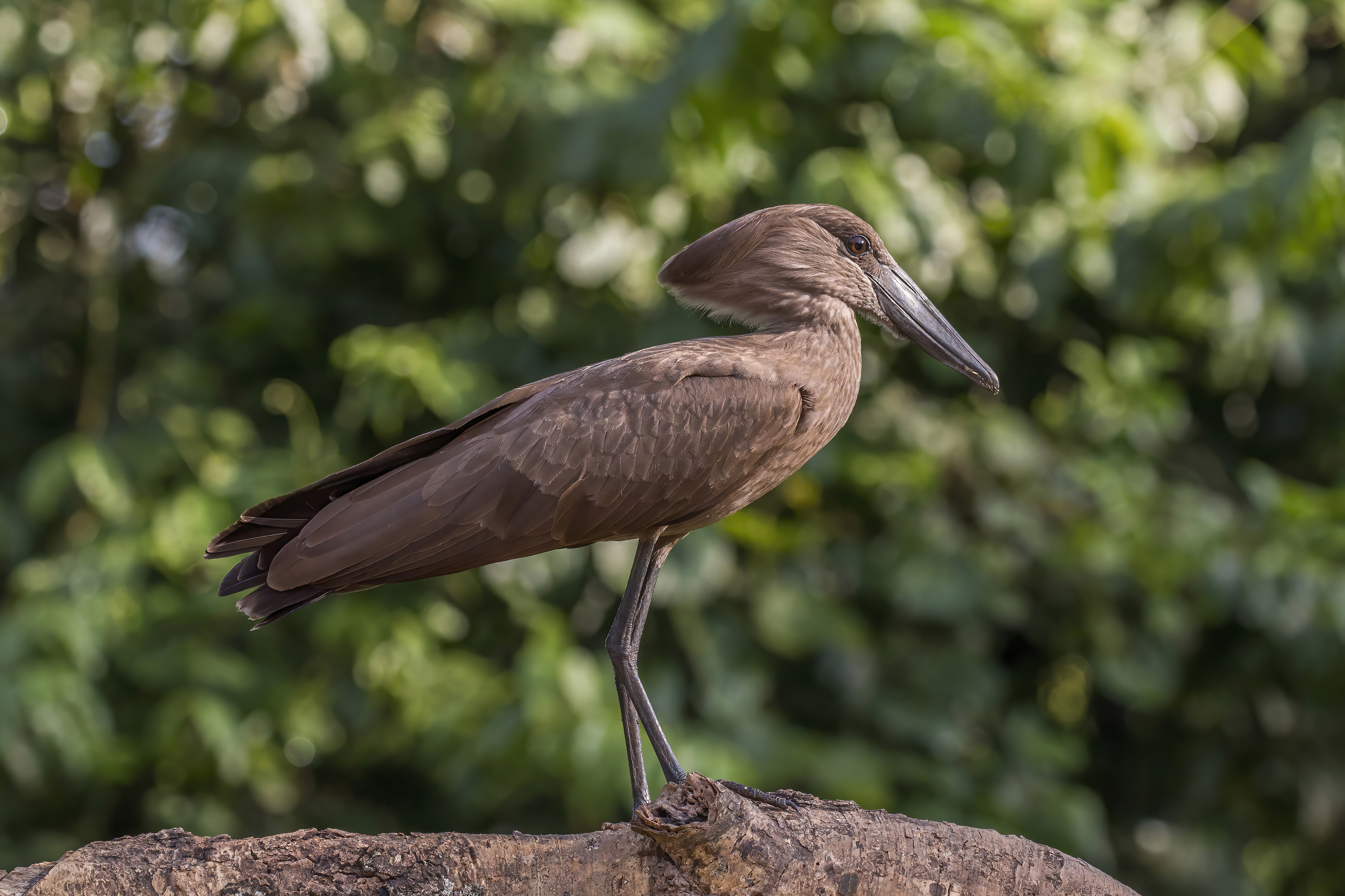
Queen Elizabeth National Park, Uganda

The hamerkop (Scopus umbretta), also called the umbrette, is a medium-sized water bird with brown plumage. It is found in mainland Africa, Madagascar and Arabia, living in a wide variety of wetlands, including estuaries, lakesides, fish ponds, riverbanks, and rocky coasts. The shape of its head, with its long bill and crest at the back, gives this species its name, hamerkop being the Afrikaans word for hammerhead. Long considered to sit with the Ciconiiformes, the species and its family is now placed with the Pelecaniformes, its closest relatives thought to be the pelicans and the shoebill. It is the only living species in the genus Scopus and the family Scopidae.

The hamerkop is a sedentary bird that often shows local movements. Usually hunting in shallow water, either by sight or touch, it feeds mostly on fish and amphibians; however, the species is adaptable and will take any prey it can. The species is renowned for its enormous nests, several of which it builds during the breeding season. Unusually for a wading bird, the species constructs its nest with an internal nesting chamber where the eggs are laid. Both parents incubate the eggs and raise the chicks.

The species is not globally threatened and is locally abundant in mainland Africa and Madagascar. The International Union for Conservation of Nature (IUCN) has assessed it as being of least concern.

== Taxonomy and systematics ==
The hamerkop was first described by the French zoologist Mathurin Jacques Brisson in 1760 in his landmark Ornithologia, which was published two years after the tenth edition of Carl Linnaeus' Systema Naturae. The species was subsequently described and illustrated by French polymath Comte de Buffon. When the German naturalist Johann Friedrich Gmelin revised and expanded Linnaeus's Systema Naturae in 1788 he included the hamerkop and cited the earlier authors. He placed the species in the genus Scopus that had been introduced by Brisson and coined the binomial name Scopus umbretta.

Brisson's names for bird genera were widely adopted by the ornithological community despite the fact that he did not use Linnaeus' binomial system. The International Commission on Zoological Nomenclature ruled in 1911 that Brisson's genera were available under the International Code of Zoological Nomenclature, so Brisson is considered to be the genus authority for the hamerkop. The generic name, Scopus, is derived from the Ancient Greek skia for "shadow". The specific name umbretta is modified from the Latin for "umber" or "dark brown".

The hamerkop is sufficiently distinct to be placed in its own family, although the relationships of this species to other families has been a longstanding mystery. The hamerkop was usually included in the Ciconiiformes, but is now thought to be closer to the Pelecaniformes. Recent studies have found that its closest relatives are the pelicans and shoebill. Although the hamerkop is the only living member of its family, one extinct species is known from the fossil record. Scopus xenopus was described by ornithologist Storrs Olson in 1984 based on two bones found in Pliocene deposits from South Africa. Scopus xenopus was slightly larger than the hamerkop and Olson speculated based on the shape of the tarsus that the species may have been more aquatic. The hammerkop fossil record also includes fossil tracks from 90-130 thousand years ago.

The hamerkop is also known as the hammerkop, hammerkopf, hammerhead, hammerhead stork, umbrette, umber bird, tufted umber, or anvilhead.

=== Subspecies ===
Two subspecies are recognized—the widespread nominate race S. u. umbretta and the smaller of West African S. u. minor, described by George Latimer Bates in 1931. Two other subspecies have been proposed. S. u. bannermani of south-west Kenya is usually lumped with the nominate race. Birds in Madagascar have been suggested to be distinct, in which case they would be placed in the subspecies S. u. tenuirostris. That proposed subspecies was described by Austin L. Rand in 1936. It has also been suggested that birds near the Kavango River in Namibia may be distinct, but no formal description has been made.

== Description ==
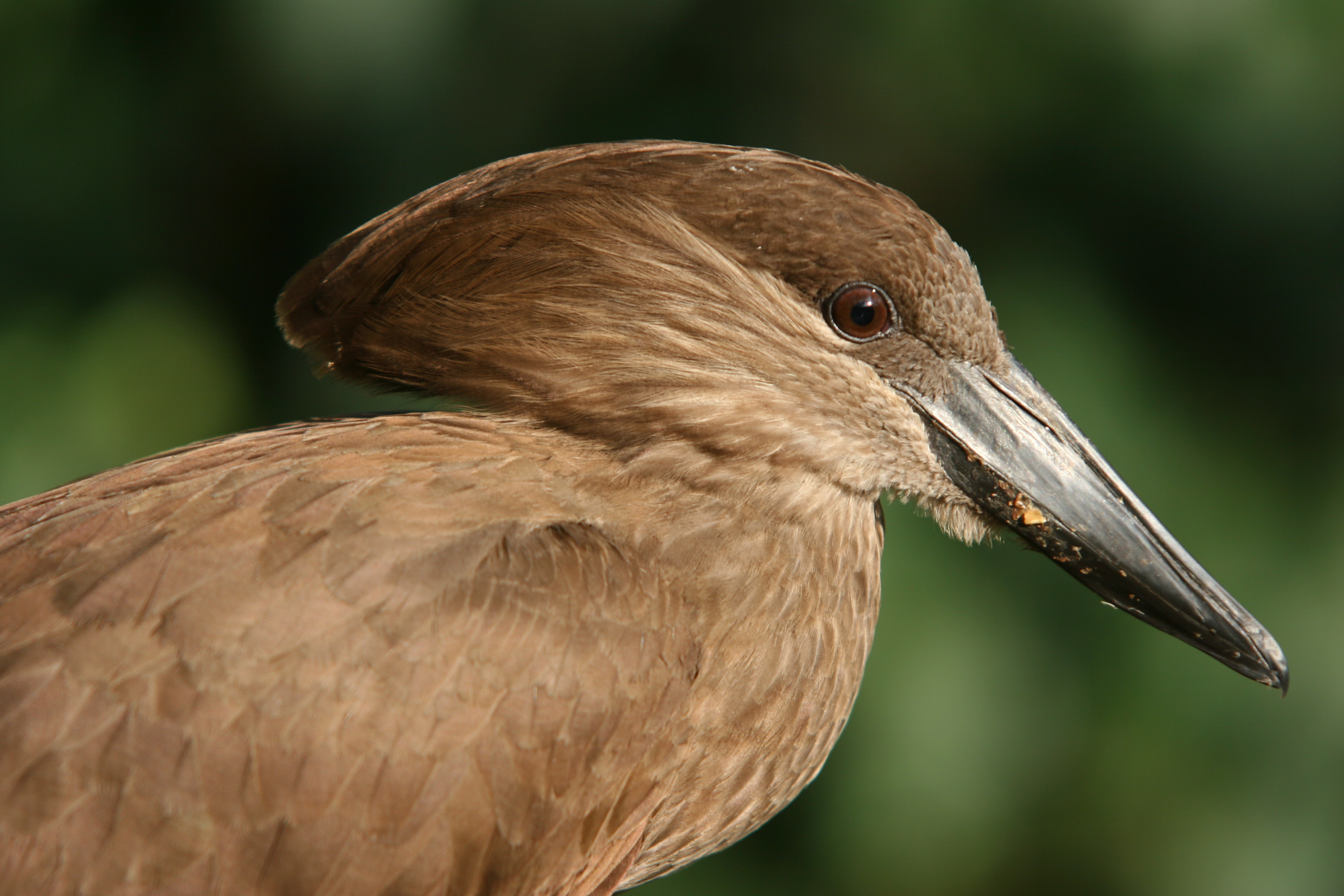
The subspecies S. u. minor is smaller and darker.

The hamerkop is a medium-sized waterbird, standing 56 cm (22 in) high and weighing 470 g (17 oz), although the subspecies S. u. minor is smaller. Its plumage is a drab brown with purple iridescence on the back; S. u. minor is darker. The tail is faintly barred with darker brown. The sexes are alike and fledglings resemble adults. The bill is long, 80 to 85 mm (3.1–3.3 in), and slightly hooked at the end. It resembles the bill of a shoebill, and is quite compressed and thin, particularly at the lower half of the mandible. The bill is brown in young birds, but becomes black by the time a bird fledges.

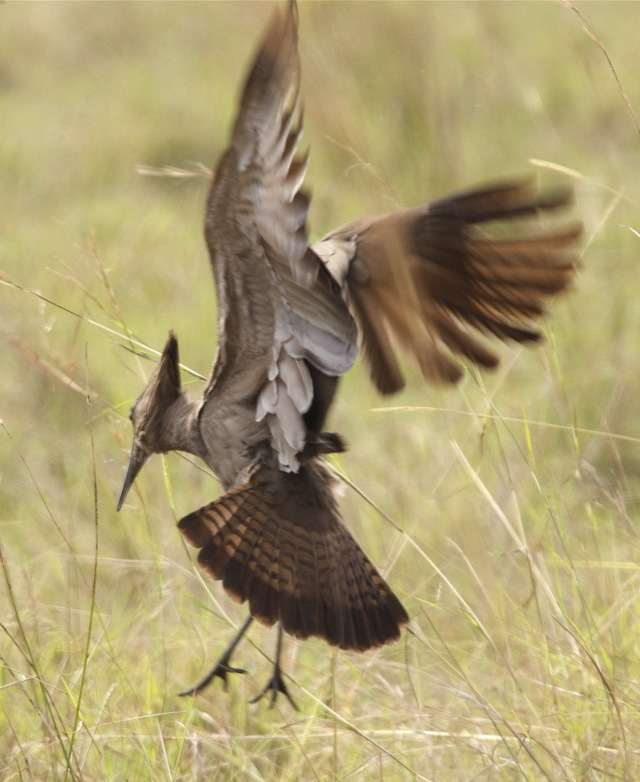
Hamerkop in flight, with spread tail showing barring

The neck and legs are proportionately shorter than those of similar looking Pelecaniformes. The bare parts of the legs are black and the legs are feathered only to the upper part of the tibia. The hamerkop has, for unknown reasons, partially webbed feet. The middle toe is comb-like (pectinated) like a heron's. Its tail is short and its wings are big, wide, and round-tipped; it soars well, although it does so less than the shoebill or storks. When it does so, it stretches its neck forward like a stork or ibis, but when it flaps, it coils its neck back something like a heron. Its gait when walking is jerky and rapid, with its head and neck moving back and forth with each step. It may hold its wings out when running for extra stability.

== Distribution and habitat ==
The hamerkop occurs in sub-Saharan Africa, Madagascar, and coastal south-west Arabia. It requires shallow water in which to forage, and is found in all wetland habitats, including rivers, streams, seasonal pools, estuaries, reservoirs, marshes, mangroves, irrigated land such as rice paddies, savannahs, and forests. In Tanzania, it has also recently begun to feed on rocky shores. In Arabia, it is found in rocky wadis with running water and trees. Most are sedentary within their territories, which are held by pairs, but some migrate into suitable habitat during the wet season only. The species is very tolerant of humans and readily feeds and breeds in villages and other human-created habitats.

== Behaviour and ecology ==
The hamerkop is mostly active during the day, often resting at noon during the heat of the day. They can be somewhat crepuscular, being active around dusk, but are not nocturnal as has sometimes been reported.

=== Social behaviour and calls ===
The hamerkop is mostly silent when alone, but is fairly vocal when in pairs or in groups. The only call it usually makes when alone is a flight-call, a shrill "nyip" or "kek". In groups, vocalisations include a range of calls including cackles and nasal rattles. One highly social call is the "yip-purr" call. This call is only made in a social context, when at least three birds, but up to 20 are gathered in a flock. Birds start by giving a number of "yip" calls, eventually giving way to purring notes. This call is made with the neck extended and sometimes accompanied by wing flapping, and becomes more vigorous when larger numbers of birds are present.

Another common social behaviour is "false mounting", in which one bird stands on top of another and appears to mount it, but they do not copulate. This behaviour has been noted between both mated pairs and unmated birds, and even between members of the same sex and in reversed mountings, where females mount males. Because of this, the behaviour is thought to be social and not related to the pair bond. Dominant birds may signal to subordinates by opening their bills slightly and erecting their crests, but the species is not very aggressive in general towards others of its species. Birds in groups also engage in social allopreening. One bird presents its face of back of the head to the other to be preened.

=== Food and feeding ===
This species normally feeds alone or in pairs, but also feeds in large flocks sometimes. It is a generalist, although amphibians and fish form the larger part of its diet. The diet also includes shrimp, insects, and rodents. The type of food they take seems to vary by location, with clawed frogs and tadpoles being important parts of the diet in East and Southern Africa and small fish being almost the only prey taken in Mali. Because it is willing to take a wide range of food items and also take very small prey, it is not resource-limited and only feeds for part of the day.

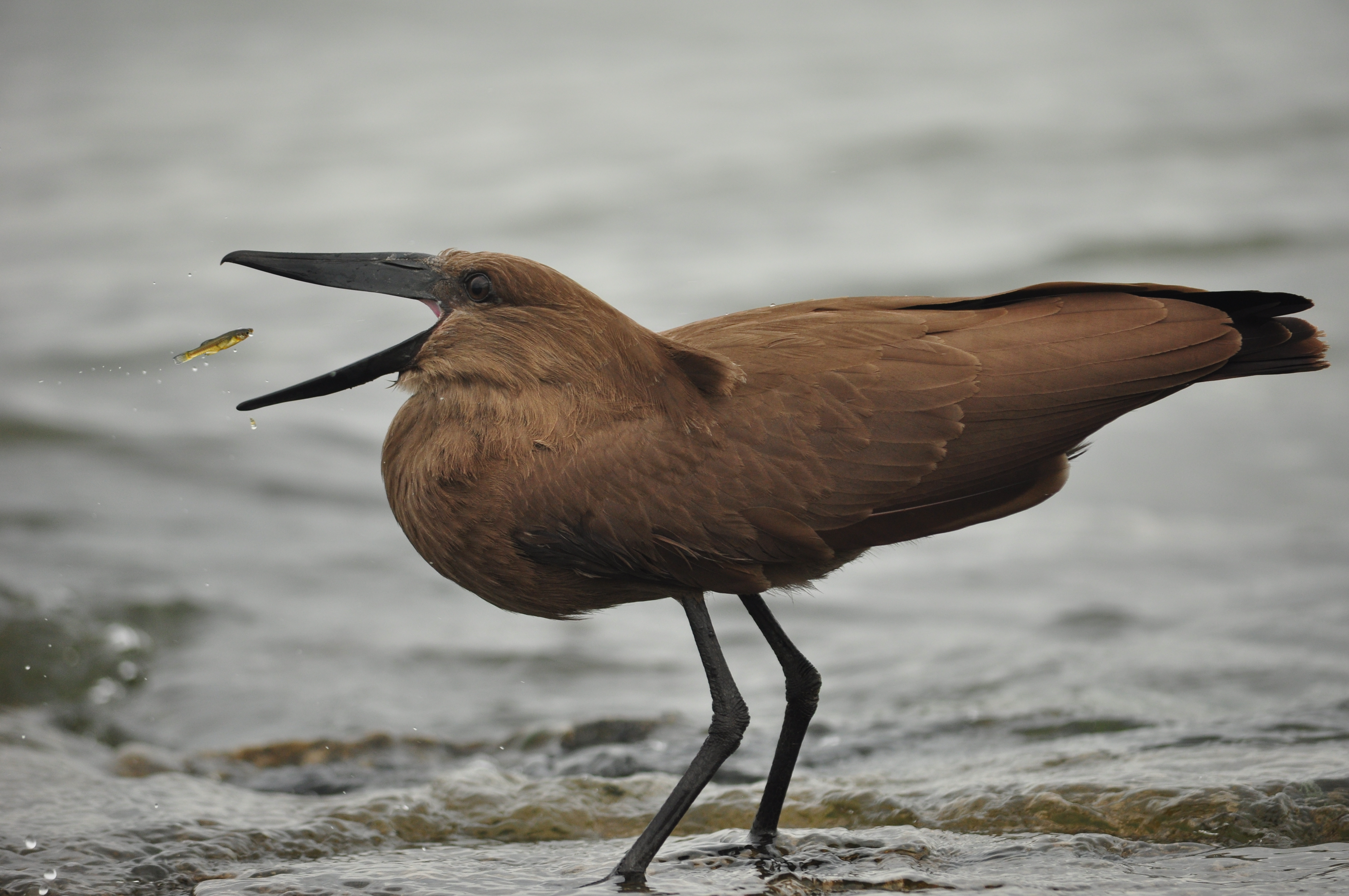
Eating a fish

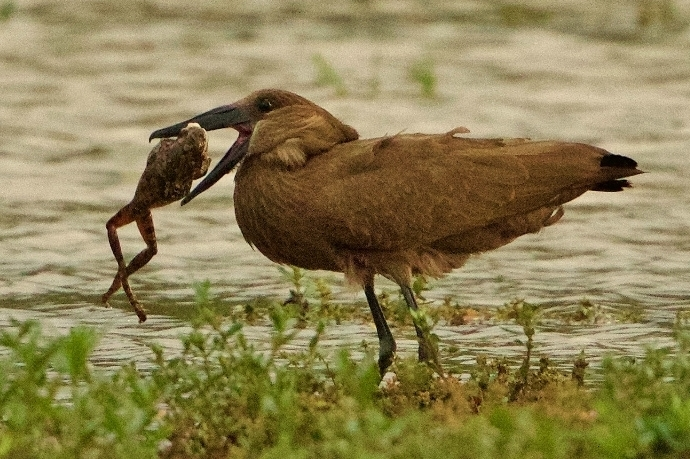
Eating a grey foam-nest tree frog

The usual method of hunting is to walk in shallow water looking for prey. Prey is located differently depending on circumstances; if the water is clear, it may hunt by sight, but if the water is very muddy, it probes its open bill into water or mud and shuts it. It may shuffle one foot at a time on the bottom or suddenly open its wings to flush prey out of hiding. Prey caught in mud is shaken before swallowing to clean it, or if available, taken to clearer water to do so. The species also feeds while in flight. A bird flies slowly low over the water with legs dangling and head looking down, then dipping feet down and hovering momentarily when prey is sighted. The prey is then snatched with the bill and swallowed in flight. This method of hunting can be very successful, with one birds catching prey on 27 of 33 attempts during one 45-minute session. It is also opportunistic, and feeds on swarming termites when they conduct their nuptial flights, snatching as many as 47 alates (flying termites) in five minutes.

This species has been recorded foraging for insects flushed by grazing cattle and buffalo, in a manner similar cattle egrets, and has been observed fishing off the backs of hippopotamuses. It has also been recorded feeding in association with banded mongooses; when a band of mongooses began hunting frogs in dried mud at the side of a pool of water a pair of hamerkops attended the feeding group, catching frogs that escaped the mongooses.

=== Breeding ===
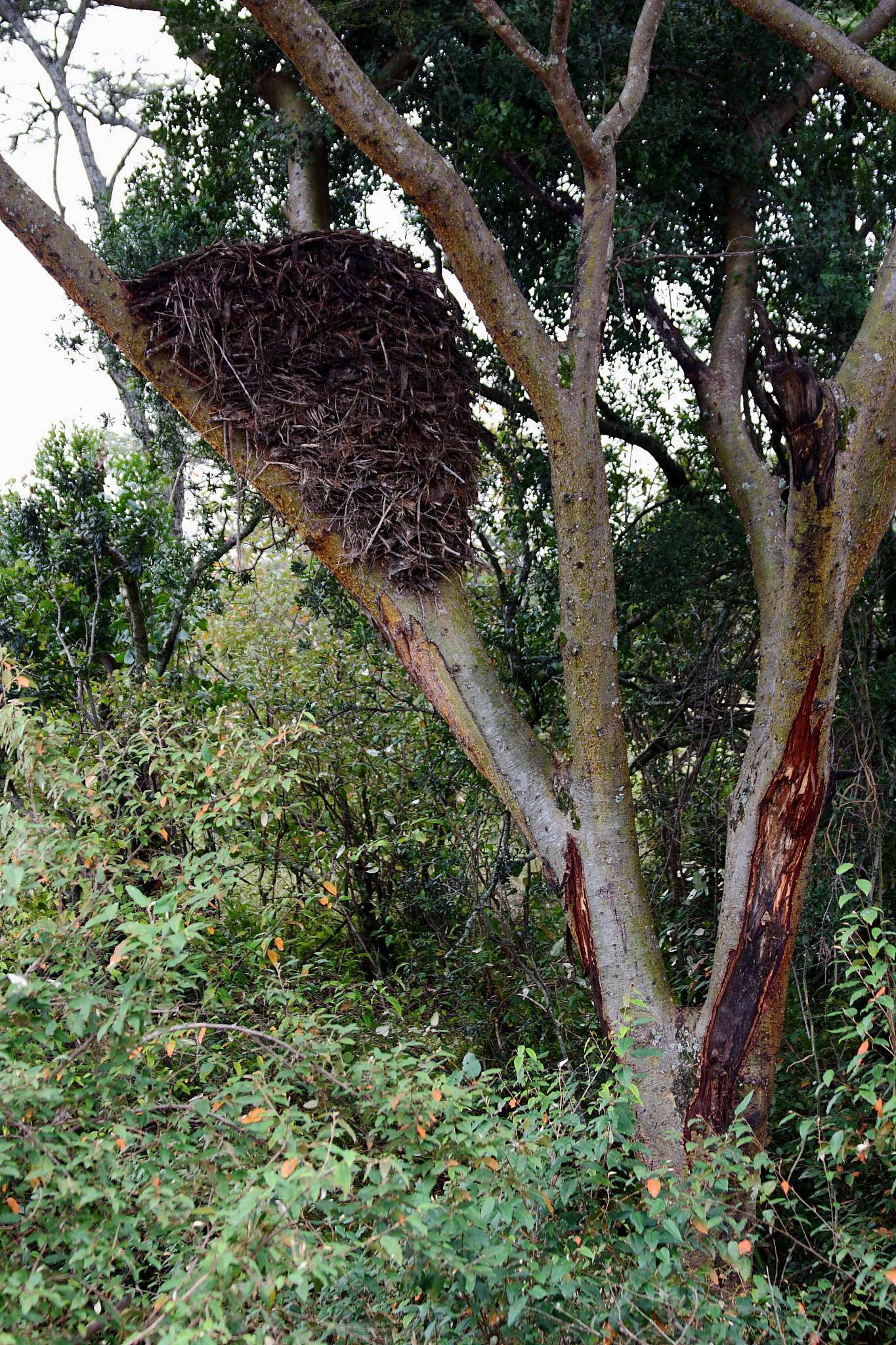
Full view of nest built in the fork of an acacia tree

The strangest aspect of hamerkop behaviour is the huge nest, sometimes more than 1.5 m (4 ft 11 in) across, and strong enough to support a man's weight. When possible, it is built in the fork of a tree, often over water, but if necessary, it is built on a bank, a cliff, a human-built wall or dam, or on the ground. A pair starts by making a platform of sticks held together with mud, then builds walls and a domed roof. A mud-plastered entrance 13–18 cm (5.1–7.1 in) wide in the bottom leads through a tunnel up to 60 cm (24 in) long to a nesting chamber big enough for the parents and young. Nests have been recorded to take between 10 and 14 weeks to build, and one researcher estimated that they would require around 8,000 sticks or bunches of grass to complete. Nesting material may still be added by the pair after the nest has been completed and eggs have been laid. Much of the nesting material added after completion is not sticks, but an odd collection of random items including bones, hide, and human waste.

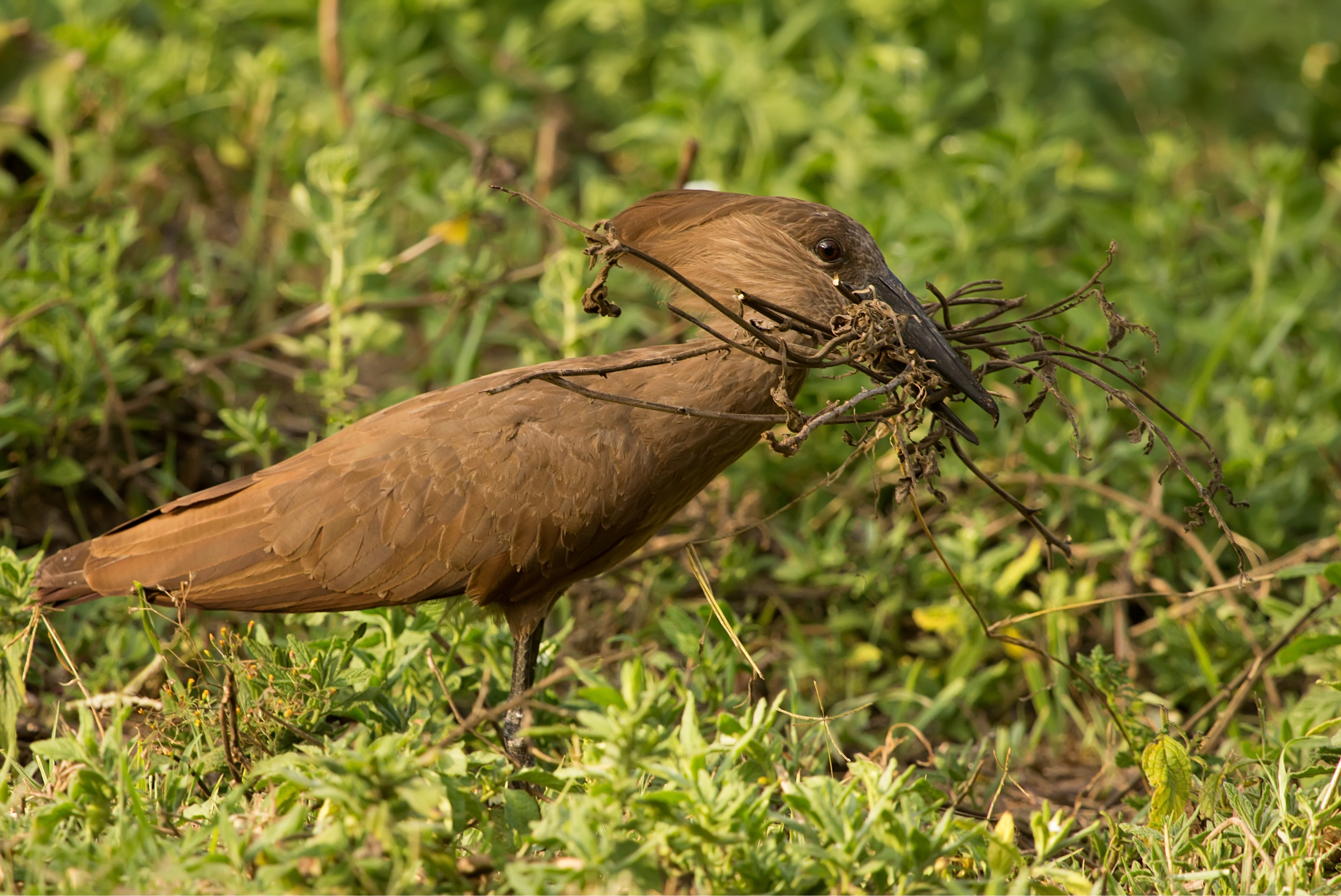
Individual collecting nesting material at Lake Naivasha, Kenya

Pairs of hamerkop are compulsive nest builders, constructing three to five nests per year whether they are breeding or not. Both members of the pair build the nest, and the building of nests may have a function in creating or maintaining the pair bond between them. Barn owls and eagle owls may force them out and take over the nests, but when the owls leave, the pair may reuse the nest. Owls may also use abandoned nests, as may snakes, small mammals such as genets, and various birds, and weaver birds, starlings, and pigeons may attach their nests to the outside. A few reports exist of hamerkops nesting close together, including in Uganda, where 639 nests were seen in an area of 8 km^{2} (3.1 sq mi); even if each pair had made seven nests, this would mean 80 pairs were nesting in that area. The species is not treated as colonial, as it does not habitually nest close together, but is not thought to be highly territorial, either. Even where pairs have home ranges that are more spread out those home ranges overlap and are the boundaries are poorly defined.

Breeding happens year-round in East Africa, and in the rest of its range, it peaks at different times, with a slight bias towards the dry season. Pairs engage in a breeding display, then copulate on the nest or on the ground nearby. The clutch consists of three to seven eggs which start chalky white, but soon become stained. The eggs measure 44.5 mm × 33.9 mm (1.75 in × 1.33 in) on average, and weight around 27.8 g (0.98 oz), but considerable variation is seen. Egg size varies by season, by the overall size of the clutch, and from bird to bird. Both sexes incubate the eggs, but the female seems to do most of the work. Incubation takes around 30 days from the first egg being laid to hatching, eggs are laid with intervals of one to three days, and they hatch asynchronously.

Both parents feed the young, often leaving them alone for long times. This habit, which is unusual for wading birds, may be made possible because of the thick nest walls. The young hatch covered with grey down. By 17 days after hatching, their head and crest plumage is developed, and in a month, their body plumage. They first leave the nest around 44 to 50 days after hatching, but continue to use the nest for roosting at night until they are two months old.

== Relationship with humans ==
Many legends exist about the hamerkop. In some regions, people state that other birds help it build its nest. The ǀXam informants of Wilhelm Bleek said that when a hamerkop flew and called over their camp, they knew that someone close to them had died.

It is known in some cultures as the lightning bird, and the Kalahari Bushmen believe or believed that being hit by lightning resulted from trying to rob a hamerkop's nest. They also believe that the inimical god Khauna would not like anyone to kill a hamerkop. According to an old Malagasy belief, anyone who destroys its nest will get leprosy, and a Malagasy poem calls it an "evil bird". Such beliefs have given the bird some protection. A south African name Njaka meaning "rain doctor" is derived from its habit of calling loudly prior to rain.

Scopus, a database of abstracts and citations for scholarly journal articles, received its name in honour of this bird, as did the journal of the East African Natural History Society, Scopus.
