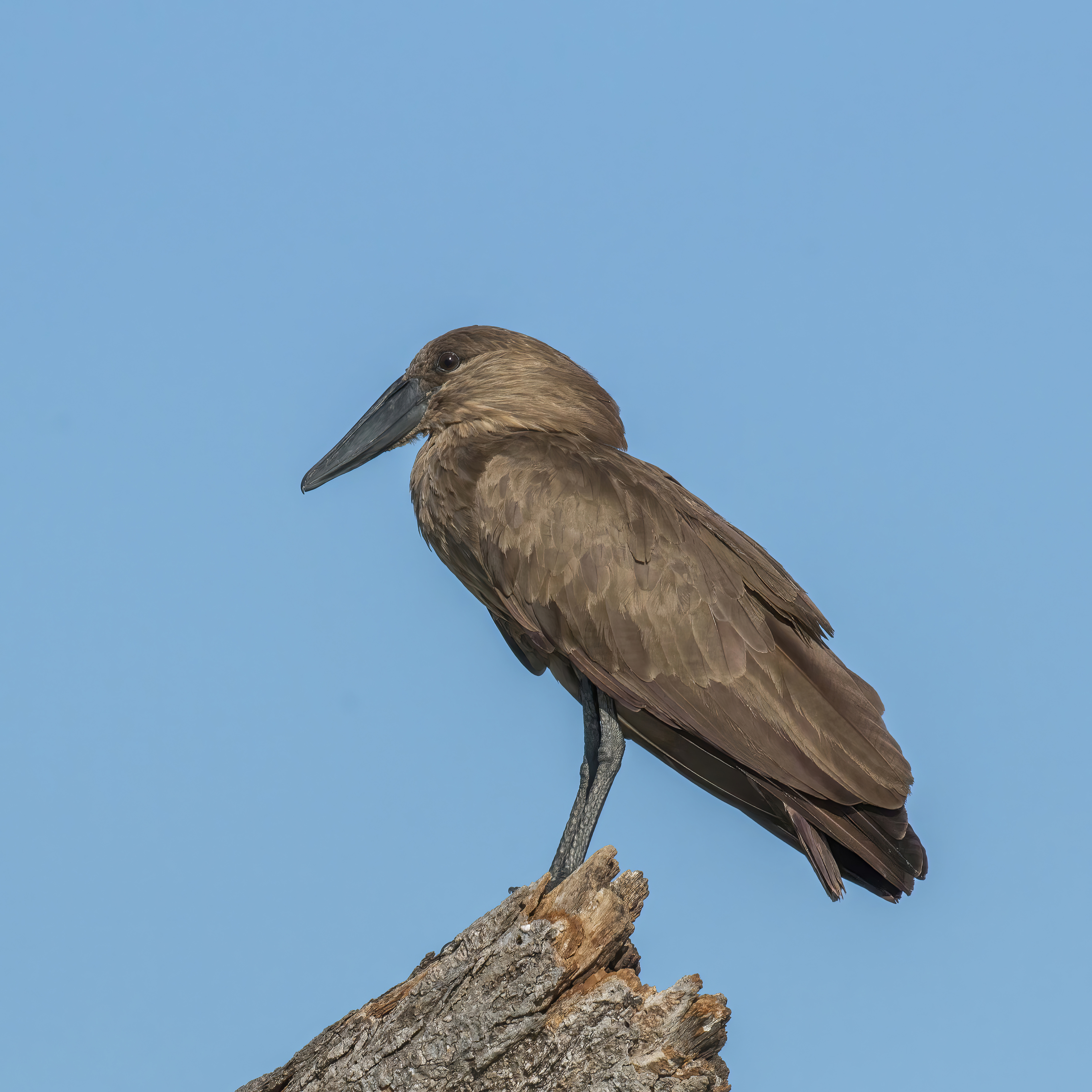
- S. u. umbretta, Kenya

Scientific classification
- Kingdom: Animalia
- Phylum: Chordata
- Class: Aves
- Order: Pelecaniformes
- Suborder: Pelecani
- Family: Scopidae; Bonaparte, 1849
- Genus: Scopus; Gmelin, 1789

Species
- Scopus umbretta; †Scopus xenopus

= Scopus (bird) =

Scopus Temporal range: Pliocene–Recent

Genus of birds

Scopus is a genus of wading birds containing the hamerkop (Scopus umbretta) and its extinct Pliocene relative, Scopus xenopus. This genus is the sole representative of the family Scopidae.

== Taxonomy ==
Hamerkops were traditionally included in the Ciconiiformes, but are now thought to be closer to the Pelecaniformes. Recent studies have found that its closest relatives are the pelicans and shoebill.
