= Scopus xenopus =

Scopus xenopus Temporal range: Pliocene

Scientific classification
- Domain: Eukaryota
- Kingdom: Animalia
- Phylum: Chordata
- Class: Aves
- Order: Pelecaniformes
- Family: Scopidae
- Genus: Scopus
- Species: †S. xenopus

Binomial name
- †Scopus xenopus Olson, 1984

Extinct bird

Scopus xenopus is an extinct species of bird related to the hamerkop that lived during the Pliocene of South Africa. It was first described by Storrs L. Olson in 1984. Compared to S. umbretta, the modern hamerkop, S. xenopus was larger and had a foot structure more adapted to swimming.
