= Get Millie Black =

British television series (2024– )

- Genre: Crime drama
- Created by: Marlon James
- Written by: Marlon James
- Directed by: Tanya Hamilton; Annetta Laufer
- Starring: Tamara Lawrance; Joe Dempsie; Gershwyn Eustache Jnr
- Music by: Carly Paradis
- Country of origin: United Kingdom
- Original language: English
- No. of episodes: 5

Production
- Executive producers: Marlon James; Simon Maxwell; Leopoldo Gout; Jami O'Brien
- Production locations: Jamaica; London
- Cinematography: Shabier Kirchner
- Production company: Motive Pictures

Original release
- Network: Channel 4; HBO
- Release: 25 November – 23 December 2024

Get Millie Black is a British television series created by writer Marlon James. Developed by Motive Pictures, it appears on Channel 4 in the United Kingdom and HBO in the United States. The series first premiered on HBO on 25 November 2024 and was later shown on Channel 4 from 5 March 2025.

== Premise ==
Jamaican-born detective Millie-Jean Black is forced out of Scotland Yard, and she returns home to join the Jamaican Police Force. (Note: Name changed from the real Jamaica Constabulary Force in the TV series.) She and her partner, Curtis, investigate missing person cases, and their lives are up-ended when one of their investigations crosses paths with another that brought Scotland Yard detective Luke Holborn to Kingston.

== Cast and characters ==
- Tamara Lawrance as Millie-Jean Black
- Joe Dempsie as Luke Holborn
- Anjli Mohindra as Meera Thakur
- Gershwyn Eustache Jnr as Curtis
- Chyna McQueen as Hibiscus
- Nestor Aaron Absera as Corsica
- Peter John Thwaites as Freddie Somerville

== Episodes ==
No.	Title	Directed by	Written by	Original release date
1	"Millie"	Tanya Hamilton	Marlon James	25 November 2024
After decades in the U.K., feeling the pain of the death of her brother, followed by the death of a missing child she was searching for, Scotland Yard detective Millie Black decides to return home to Jamaica and join the Jamaican Police Force (JPF). Finding her transgender sister Orville alive (their mother lied to Millie about her death) and now living as Hibiscus, Millie attempts to reconnect with her. Millie and her partner Curtis are assigned the case of Janet, a missing schoolgirl, that puts them on a collision course with U.K. Detective Luke Holborn, who is investigating the Sanguis Meridian gang, and the Somervilles, a powerful Kingston family connected with the gang. Freddie Somerville has agreed to be an informant for Holborn.
2	"Hibiscus"	Tanya Hamilton	Marlon James	1 December 2024
With Curtis in the hospital and Hibiscus recovering from an attack on the Gully, Millie throws herself into her work. Initially suspicious of Holborn, Millie is compelled to team up with him when Janet's case is connected to Freddie – leading to a disturbing discovery of potential human trafficking. Their investigation takes them to the Somerville estate, where they find the family (sans Freddie) and staff slaughtered.
3	"Holborn"	Annetta Laufer	Theresa Ikoko & Marlon James	9 December 2024
Millie reluctantly works with Holborn on their intertwined cases. Hibiscus and Millie find a new balance in their relationship, though Hibiscus decides to return to the Gully. Millie and Holborn finally locate Janet and Freddie at a ship dock attempting to leave for Cuba, where Holborn convinces a JPF sniper to kill Freddie, who has pulled a gun on Millie. It is revealed that Holborn is part of the effort to kill the Somervilles; a flashback shows him suffocating the Somerville patriarch, who had not succumbed to his bullet wounds at the house slaughter.
4	"Janet"	Annetta Laufer	Lydia Adetunji	16 December 2024
With Freddie's execution and not knowing whom to trust, Millie goes rogue to get to the bottom of the Somervilles' criminal enterprise before Holborn can interfere. Millie tries to protect Janet, but Janet escapes and contacts Holborn. Holborn tries to get to Millie by visiting Hibiscus in the Gully and threatening her life. Millie arrives, and Holborn executes an unsuspecting Janet. Millie and Holborn struggle with each other, and as Holborn is about to kill Millie, Hibiscus knifes Holborn in the back, who falls to the ground. Millie decides to impersonate another Jamaican woman – who was unaware she's to be a trafficking victim – and flies to London to try to find Romeo.
5	"Curtis"	Jean Luc Herbulot	Marlon James	23 December 2024
In Kingston, Janet's body is found and Curtis is arrested – revealing his homosexuality to the JPF – for lying about Millie's whereabouts. In London, Millie learns more details about the extensive human trafficking / slave labour operation led by Lindo, then flees the traffickers; she goes to her former Scotland Yard partner, Meera, for investigative help. Holborn survives the knifing, finds Millie, and explains how Lindo recruited him with money, but pushed him to murder by threatening his family. Now working together to find Romeo, Holborn is killed by Natalie (Umi Meyers), the real identity of Lindo. Millie eventually rescues Romeo, breaking the trafficking case wide open, though Natalie escapes. Millie returns to Jamaica, is drummed out of the proven-inept JPF, and tells Hibiscus that she sold their house and will be staying in Jamaica.

== Production ==
In December 2021, it was announced that Marlon James was writing and executive producing his first television series, Get Millie Black for HBO and Channel 4, produced by Motive Pictures., and Leopoldo Gout, Shortly before the start of production, Tanya Hamilton was hired to direct, and starring roles were announced for Tamara Lawrance, Joe Dempsie, Gershwyn Eustache Jnr, and Chyna McQueen.

Filming began in May 2022, starting in Jamaica for about three months before moving to London. Marlon James adapted his own short story for the limited series, basing the main character on his mother, Shirley Dillion-James.

== Reception ==
On the review aggregator website Rotten Tomatoes, Get Millie Black has an approval rating of 100% based on 13 reviews, with an average rating of 6.5/10. Metacritic, which uses a weighted average, assigned a score of 79 out of 100 based on 10 critics, indicating "generally favorable" reviews.

The Guardian called it "a clever, unsettling crime drama that’s packed with excellent performances [...] This isn't Death in Paradise. But if you're OK with a little more blood and a little less whimsy, you may find it just as good – or even better."

Variety said, "the outstanding performances and the crimes in this setting make the show unique," calling it a "gritty and explosive whodunit." Collider described it as "an intense watch and a rare look at the societal tensions in Jamaica's underworld," but said "the series does miss a beat when it comes to the true crime formula."

The Los Angeles Times said it was a show "[d]oing everything right," adding, "[The] characters are vivid, unpredictable in a human way and perfectly played. The five-part series feels original, not quite like anything we’ve seen before," comparing it to the works of Raymond Chandler.
