= Moon Witch, Spider King =

2022 novel by Marlon James

- First edition
- Author: Marlon James
- Cover artist: Pablo Gerardo Camacho
- Language: English
- Series: Dark Star Trilogy #2
- Genre: Historical Fiction; High Fantasy; Dark Fantasy
- Publisher: Riverhead Books
- Publication date: March 3, 2022
- Media type: Print, ebook, audiobook
- Pages: 656 pp
- ISBN: 9780593541463
- OCLC: 1258071285
- Dewey Decimal: 813/.6
- LC Class: PR9265.9.J358 M66 2022
- Preceded by: Black Leopard, Red Wolf
- Followed by: TBD

Moon Witch, Spider King is a 2022 fantasy novel by Jamaican writer Marlon James. It is the second book of a planned trilogy, after Black Leopard, Red Wolf. The novel tells a story parallel to, and intersecting with, the first novel. The novel draws on African history and mythology, blended into the landscape of the North Kingdom and the South Kingdom, and the political tensions between these two warring states, as well as various city-states and tribes in the surrounding landscape. The rights to produce a film adaptation were purchased by Michael B. Jordan in February 2019 before the release of the first book.

== Plot ==
=== Part 1: No Name Woman ===
Sogolon begins life as a nameless girl enslaved and abused by her brothers. Sogolon escapes and flees to the city of Kongor in the Northern Kingdom. She is taken in by Miss Azora, owner of a brothel. Sogolon survives by drugging the men that come to have sex with her and stealing from them, plotting to leave the pleasure house. Mistress Komwono, the wife of one of the brothel's patrons, tracks her husband and uses a talisman to kill Miss Azora and several other workers. Mistress Komwono recognizes Sogolon's craftiness and makes Sogolon her ward.

Sogolon's time in the Komwono household is spent sleeping in the slave quarters, being ignored by Master Komwono (who recognizes her from the pleasure house), and learning proper behavior from Mistress Komwono. Sogolon is forbidden from entering the library of the house and witnesses Master Komwono's mistreatment of the enslaved people and staff, which Mistress Komwono ignores and enables. Master Komwono attempts to force himself on Sogolon. An unknown force, later revealed to be Sogolon's own innate magical ability, impales Master Komwono on the ceiling. An investigation follows, and Mistress Komwono leads the household back to the capital city of Fasisi, attempting to rejoin the royal court after an exile.

In Fasisi, Sogolon meets Keme, a royal guard who is attracted to her; and the Aesi, an advisor to the king. She also meets the Sangomin, young witch hunters with magical abilities who are all devoted to the Aesi. Mistress Komwono gives Sogolon to Princess Emini, and Sogolon joins the royal household. Princess Emini treats Sogolon poorly, as Sogolon does not appear to have any "women's skills".

Sogolon begins to uncover the inner workings of the royal family. Princess Emini rules the kingdom in all but name; as the royal daughter, it will be her duty to birth and raise the future King. However, Emini's husband appears to be barren and rumors spread throughout the city of Emini's sexual encounters with other court members as she attempts to conceive a bastard to take the throne. The Aesi seems to have the magical ability to remove memories from court members. Sogolon uncovers clues to a mystery surrounding Commander Olu and a woman named Jeleza.

The current King dies. The new king, Kwash Moki (formerly Prince Likud), puts Emini on trial for whoredom. She and Sogolon are exiled to Mantha, a city for nuns. En route to Mantha, Emini reveals her plans for a great city hidden in the trees. Sogolon shares her theory that the Aesi is removing memories from the royal family and court to maintain power behind the throne, wondering how long the Aesi has been in the kingdom. The Sangomin attack the caravan, murdering escorts and Emini. Sogolon flees and is caught by the Sangomin. Before the Sangomin can kill her, Sogolon summons her powers, which she calls the wind (not wind). Sogolon wanders the wilderness and is found by the royal guard, including Keme, who does not recognize Sogolon due to memory tempering from the Aesi. Keme and the royal guard capture Sogolon and return her to Fasisi.

=== Part 2: A Girl Is A Hunted Animal ===
Keme takes Sogolon back to his home, and she becomes his common-law wife. She lives with his first wife, Yétúnde, and their children. At night, Sogolon sneaks out to battle in gladiator fights as No Name Boy, binding her breasts to appear as a young man. The gladiator fights serve as a release for Sogolon's rage. Sogolon becomes pregnant and gives birth to quadruplets, two of whom are lions. Keme reveals that he is a lion shapeshifter, but he has hidden this as shapeshifters are treated as second-class citizens in Fasisi. Sogolon encourages Keme to live as himself openly, disgusting Yétúnde. Sogolon discovers that Yétúnde murdered her own children if they showed any signs of being lion or shapeshifter; Yétúnde flees. Sogolon raises Yétúnde's children as her own. Sogolon sees Commander Olu, who by this point has lost all memories of his former life. This encounter alerts the Aesi to Sogolon's presence in Fasisi. The Aesi and members of the royal guard attack her home, killing her son Ehede. Enraged, Sogolon uses the wind (not wind) to kill the Aesi and the guards. With the Aesi gone, the royal household is freed from his magic, plunging the kingdom into chaos. Sogolon grieves her child, taking her rage out on Keme and the other children.

=== Part 3: Moon Witch ===
The narrative jumps forward more than one hundred years. Sogolon now lives in the Sunk City, foraging and living among the monkeys and animals of the jungle. Sogolon does not recall her previous life, and she becomes a vengeful hunter of men who abuse women. She becomes known as the Moon Witch. Sogolon meets Bunshi, a minor water spirit, and Nsaka Ne Vampi, her own great-great-granddaughter. They try to convert Sogolon to their cause and reveal her past to her.

Bunshi and Nsaka narrate Sogolon's story to her. Sogolon abandoned Keme and her remaining family when she learned that the Aesi was alive in the South. When the Aesi dies, he is reborn as an ordinary boy 8 years later, and when he turns 12, he becomes reincarnated as the Aesi once more. Sogolon learned he was about to come of age in Omororo and hoped to stop him by murdering the child before he became the Aesi. Sogolon failed, and her memory was wiped from her, leading her to become the Moon Witch in the Sunk City. Other water spirits helped to save the Aesi; Sogolon does not trust Bunshi because of this. The Aesi rejoined the royal household of the North. Bunshi and Nsaka convince Sogolon to join them to restore the true line of Northern kings. Sogolon is not a true believer, but agrees to join them due to her hatred of the Aesi.

They journey to Mantha, where they meet the King's sister Lissisolo. Spies alert the Aesi after Lissisolo gives birth, and they are forced to flee. Sogolon, Nsaka, and Lissisolo use the Ten and Nine Doors to reach Kongor. After entering the Doors, Sogolon is beset by the vengeful ghosts of men she had killed as the Moon Witch. When they arrive in Dolingo, Sogolon realizes it is the city in the trees that Emini planned. Almost all functions are automated, including elevators and carts to move between the trees. Dolingo is ruled by the Queen and managed and run by the White Scientists, necromancers who have perfected the art of human cloning. Sogolon attempts to convince the Queen of Dolingo to join their cause to stop the Aesi and find the boy. Sogolon discovers that the "automation" of Dolingo is actually the work of slaves hidden in the walls and floors of Dolingo, horrifying her and leaving her disillusioned with the richness of the city.

=== Part 4: The Wolf and the Lightning Bird ===
At this point, Sogolon's story intersects with Tracker from Black Leopard, Red Wolf, providing Sogolon's perspective on the events of that book.

Bunshi gathers Nsaka, Nyka, Tracker, Fumeli, Leopard, Sadogo, and Sogolon. They journey to Kongor, but the party falls apart immediately. Tracker and Sogolon reunite in Kongor. Along with the prefect Mossi and a rescued girl named Venin, they travel to Dolingo. Sogolon sends a message to Dolingo warning the Queen of their impending arrival.

When they reach the city, the Queen states that she never received Sogolon's doves and that the Aesi is on the way. Sogolon suspects that Tracker betrayed her and warned the Aesi; she sells him into slavery. The slaves of Dolingo revolt as the missing boy and his captors enter the city. Venin is killed and her soul is possessed by Jakwu, a rapist that Sogolon previously killed. Sogolon is injured. As revenge for selling him into slavery, Tracker shoves Sogolon through one of the Doors, burning her very badly.

=== Part 5: No Oriki ===
Sogolon recovers from her grievous injuries, though this process takes years. She spies on Tracker and Mossi as they raise the mingi children. Although she despises Tracker, she does not want to hurt an innocent party. She watches as Sasabonsam murders Mossi and many of the children. Later, she watches as Tracker and the Aesi begin working together.

The Aesi confronts her and drags her down into the earth; Sogolon uses her wind (not wind) to protect herself and dig herself free. She arrives just as the Aesi kills Leopard and Nyka kills both the boy and himself. She then kills the Aesi with her wind (not wind). She then tracks down Jakwu in Venin's body, killing him once again.

When she heard that Tracker was captured in the Southern Kingdom, she journeyed south herself. She was also captured and has been narrating her tale to the Inquisitors of the south. She criticizes Tracker's version of the tale as somewhat untruthful and exaggerated, pointing out some inconsistencies to the Inquisitors. She states that she has time to wait, as the Aesi will not be reborn for another eight years.

== Major characters and creatures ==
=== Major characters ===
- Sogolon, originally a nameless girl, who becomes the Moon Witch
- Miss Azora, owner of a pleasure house that shelters Sogolon
- Mistress Komwono, a lady who takes in Sogolon
- Keme, royal scout, later Sogolon's husband. Later revealed to be a shapeshifter, a lion.
- Kwash Kagar, of House Akum, king when Sogolon first arrives in Fasisi
- Emini, daughter of Kwash Kagar, sister of Kwash Moki né Prince Likud
- Kwash Moki, né Prince Likud of House Akum, son of Kwash Kagar
- The Aesi, counselor to the Northern King. The Aesi is reborn eight years after he is killed and regains his powers at the age of twelve
- Bunshi, a Popele who started a quest to restore the rightful line of kings in the North
- Tracker, protagonist of Black Leopard, Red Wolf, hired by Bunshi to find the boy
- Leopard, a shapeshifter, friend and sometimes lover of Tracker
- Nsaka ne Vampi, Sogolon's great-great-granddaughter

=== Creatures ===
- The Sangomin, witch finders that each exhibit their own unique appearance and abilities, usually serving the Aesi
- Popele, water spirits and tricksters
- Zogbanu, trolls from the Blood Swamp who captured Venin
- Ipundulu, vampire lightning birds that appear to be handsome, white-skinned men wrapped in robes. In reality, the robes are their wings and they transform into carnivorous creatures when provoked. Ipundulus are commanded by witches. If an Ipundulu is masterless, it is called an Ishologu
- Sasabonsam, a bat-winged ogre with clawed feet, tusks, and black skin
- Ogo, giants

== Themes ==
The novel's themes include femininity and power, survival, the fundamentals of truth, what a name means and the power of names, appearance and double lives, the limits of power, the excesses of ambition and desire. James offers a clue to his underlying theme early on in the saga: "Truth eats lies just as the crocodile eats the moon."

== Development ==
James conceived the idea for the book long before his reception of the 2015 Man Booker Prize for his novel A Brief History of Seven Killings; he has repeatedly expressed his desire to build a "vast playground of [African] myth and history and legend that other people can draw from," analogously to J. R. R. Tolkien's similar efforts for Britain. His research, which began "in August 2015," two months before he won the Booker, took two years and was largely focused on the condition of "the pre-Christian, pre-Islam, original African religious Africa." The cultures which James principally drew on were "central and west African with a bit from the east"; the cultures of the Omo valley informed the Ku and Gangatom villages, and West African empires (Mali, Songhai, and Ghana) were the inspiration for the book's depiction of cities.

James has acknowledged his debt to the fluid nature of African oral storytelling and poetry, celebrating "the whole idea that nothing is fixed in this universe"; the implications of the unreliability of the narrator in traditional Anansi stories, he argues, "[are] not just shifting truth, it’s shifting shape, it’s shifting identity, it’s shifting sexual preference." In addition, he has noted that the idea of "an authentic story" or "director's cut" is alien to African storytelling, in which multiple versions of the same story may be given equal weight.

He began writing after a conversation with Melina Matsoukas, who mentioned the television series The Affair, in which both halves of a troubled couple remember their affair in subtly different ways; James intends the Dark Star trilogy to comprise three characters' conflicting accounts of the same events; the sequel, Moon Witch, Spider King, will be the witch Sogolon's account. James completed approximately one hundred pages of the novel before the end of the fall semester in 2016, having begun writing at the beginning of the semester.

Before the first book's release, James referred to the planned trilogy as "African Game of Thrones". He later said that the description was a joke, although he does not regret the comparison, commenting that both series retain supernatural elements while telling "decidedly adult" stories.

=== Adaptation ===
Michael B. Jordan purchased the rights to produce a film adaptation of the first novel in February 2019. James has expressed curiosity about a potential adaptation, noting that "our cinematic language of sci-fi and fantasy is still very European—particularly fantasy. And Black Leopard, Red Wolf is not even remotely European."

== Reception ==
NPR described the novel as "Sogolon's tale makes this a rare sequel that is better than the first," and "a novel that begs to be read in one sitting — though it is nearly impossible to do so without coming out the other end feeling overwhelmed and exhausted. But make no mistake, this series is absolutely a must-read".

Dzifa Benson, in a review published by the Financial Times wrote, "As gripping as the novel is, it’s a long and tough read ... James’s story is a dense, sprawling phantasmagoria made even more labyrinthine by his stream-of-consciousness idiosyncrasies and sudden time leaps. It’s a confident writer who uses African words and phrases without the need for exposition and sustains a diction that mimics the present-tense grammatical syntax of many west African languages. But Moon Witch rewards a reader’s perseverance and makes you wonder exactly who’ll play fast and loose with the truth in the final instalment, if you have the stomach and staying power to seek it out".

== Sequels ==
The third volume will tentatively be titled White Wing, Dark Star. The titles were initially given as Moon Witch, Night Devil and The Boy and the Dark Star. In 2019, James described the plan of the trilogy: "this one is more picaresque, adventure, odyssey. The second one is probably more historical, magical realist. And the third one is gonna be mostly horror."
