= Marlon James (novelist) =

Jamaican novelist (born 1970)

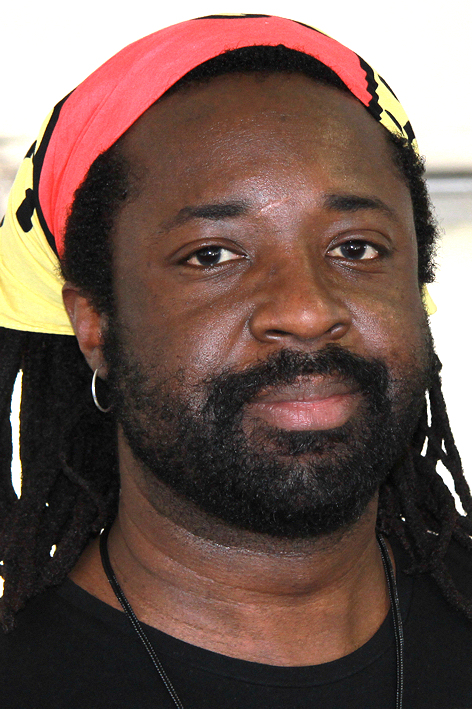
- James in 2014
- Born: 24 November 1970 (age 55); Kingston, Jamaica
- Education: University of the West Indies; Wilkes University (MFA)
- Occupation: Novelist
- Partner: Nicholas Boggs
- Writing career
- Period: 2002–present
- Genre: Fiction
- Notable works: The Book of Night Women (2009); A Brief History of Seven Killings (2014)
- Notable awards: OCM Bocas Prize for Caribbean Literature (Fiction) (2015); Anisfield-Wolf Book Award (2015); Man Booker Prize (2015); Guggenheim Fellowship (2026)
- Movement: Postcolonialism
- Website: marlonjameswriter.com

Marlon James (born 24 November 1970) is a Jamaican writer. He is the author of six novels: John Crow's Devil (2005), The Book of Night Women (2009), A Brief History of Seven Killings (2014), which won him the 2015 Man Booker Prize, Black Leopard, Red Wolf (2019), Moon Witch, Spider King (2022), and The Disappearers (2026). He also wrote the limited television series Get Millie Black.

James is a professor of Creative Writing at Stony Brook University, and professor emeritus at Macalester College in Saint Paul, Minnesota. He is also a faculty lecturer at St. Francis College's Low Residency MFA in Creative Writing.

== Early life and education ==
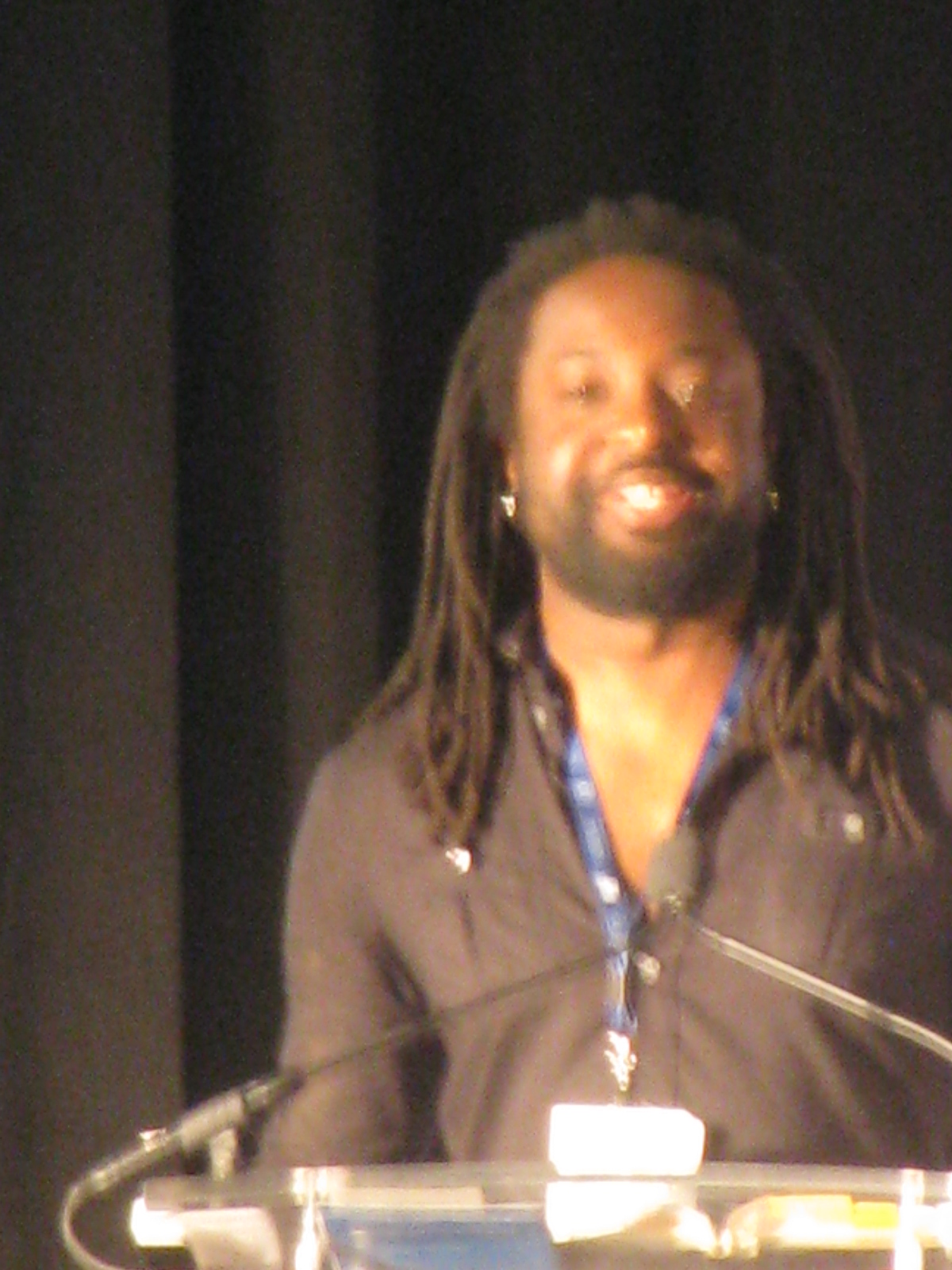
James at the 2015 U.S. National Book Festival

James was born in Kingston, Jamaica, to parents who were both in the Jamaican police: his mother (who gave him his first prose book, a collection of stories by O. Henry) became a detective and his father (from whom James took a love of Shakespeare and Coleridge) was a lawyer. James attended Kingston's prestigious Wolmer's Trust High School for Boys.

He is a 1991 graduate of the University of the West Indies, where he read language and literature. He left Jamaica to escape anti-gay violence and economic conditions that he felt would mean career stagnation, later explaining: "Whether it was in a plane or a coffin, I knew I had to get out of Jamaica." He received a Master of Fine Arts degree in creative writing from Wilkes University in Pennsylvania (2006).

== Career ==
James's first novel, John Crow's Devil (2005) – which was rejected 70 times before being accepted for publication – tells the story of a biblical struggle in a remote Jamaican village in 1957. His second novel, The Book of Night Women (2009), is about a slave woman's revolt in a Jamaican plantation in the early 19th century.

His 2014 novel, A Brief History of Seven Killings, explores several decades of Jamaican history and political instability through the perspectives of many narrators. It won the fiction category of the 2015 OCM Bocas Prize for Caribbean Literature and the 2015 Man Booker Prize for Fiction, after being the first ever book by a Jamaican author to be shortlisted. He is the second Caribbean winner of the prize, following Trinidad-born V. S. Naipaul who won in 1971.

In 2019, James published Black Leopard, Red Wolf, the first novel in the fantasy series The Dark Star trilogy, from Riverhead Books. The second novel, Moon Witch, Spider King, was published in 2022. The third book, White Wing, Dark Star, was announced in 2022.

James has taught English and creative writing at Macalester College in Saint Paul, Minnesota, since 2007, where he has Emeritus Faculty status. He is also a faculty lecturer at St. Francis College's Low Residency MFA in Creative Writing.

In 2016, James was the subject of the film The Seven Killings of Marlon James, in the BBC arts documentary series Imagine, presented and produced by Alan Yentob.

In February 2019, James gave the seventh annual Tolkien Lecture at Pembroke College, Oxford. His lecture was entitled Our Myths, Our Selves.

In 2020, James began co-hosting with his editor Jake Morrissey a literary podcast called "Marlon and Jake Read Dead People" that explores, in a casual setting, the work of deceased authors.

In 2021, he was a James Merrill House Fellow in Stonington, Connecticut, where he began writing his first television series for HBO and Channel 4 titled Get Millie Black. Get Millie Black was released in 2024 on HBO and 2025 on Channel 4, receiving critical acclaim.

James is a recipient of the 2026 Guggenheim Fellowship in Fiction.

In September 2026, James's novel The Disappearers was shortlisted for the Booker Prize. In October 2026, James was featured on the BBC Radio 4 programme Take Four Books, where he discussed how The Disappearers connects with three other works that have influenced him: Jessica Hagedorn's Dogeaters (1990), John Rechy's The Sexual Outlaw (1977), and Roberto Bolaño's The Savage Detectives (2007).

== Themes ==
Themes in James's work span religion and the supernatural, sexuality, violence, and colonialism. Often, his novels display the struggle to find an identity, whether it be as a slave or a postcolonial inhabitant of Jamaica.

=== John Crow's Devil (2005) ===
In John Crow's Devil, his first novel, James explores postcolonial Jamaica through a religiously charged, archetypal battle of good and evil. His characters in this novel represent, through their archetypal portrayals, many facets of humanity including hope. Despite the particular setting, the novel "conveys archetypal situations that reside in the collective unconsciousness." Additionally, this piece of Caribbean gothic reveals the power of guilt and hypocrisy both in a person and in a community, and generally reveals truths of human nature. The ghosts of colonialism are more subtle, but the instability and struggle for identity are clear to the reader.

=== The Book of Night Women (2009) ===
In The Book of Night Women, James challenges the traditional slave narrative by presenting a protagonist (Lilith) who approaches her enslavement with complex duality, despite the constant description of antagonism between slaves and masters on a plantation in Jamaica. Lilith hates the masters, but much of the novel deals with how she "aspires to obtain a privileged stature within plantation society by submitting to the sexual subjugation of a white overseer, Robert Quinn". This is additionally challenged by Lilith and Robert's "love", leading the reader to question the limits of love and relationships. James intends to have readers root for Robert and Lilith, but then catch themselves, as Robert Quinn has a reputation as a brutal, violent overseer—even ordering Lilith to be severely whipped. The situation for the reader is further complicated because Quinn is Irish, another population that was looked down upon during the time period. While this at times brings him sympathy, his whiteness overshadows his Irishness.

Additionally, the novel explores the complexity of what it is to be a woman, with some characters having deep connections to Obeah and Myal spiritualism. The female slaves are portrayed as strong-willed and intelligent, while the male slaves are often portrayed as weak, thoughtless, and even traitorous. "Rape, torture, murder and other dehumanizing acts propel the narrative, never failing to shock in both their depravity and their humanness. It is this complex intertwining that makes James's book so disturbing and so eloquent". The novel "defies hegemonic notions of empire by pointing out the explosive and antagonistic relationship between colonizers and colonized."

=== A Brief History of Seven Killings (2014) ===
James's 2014 novel, A Brief History of Seven Killings, portrays "a passionate, often angry account of postcolonial society struggling to balance identity and a burgeoning criminal element." The novel has twelve narrators, contributing to the "excess" that Sheri-Marie Harrison explores in her article "Excess in A Brief History of Seven Killings". She explains: "James's rejection of a purely nationalist tradition, like that of other authors in his cohort, concretizes his critique of the ways nationalism distracts us from the increased deregulation of global capital and its production of material inequality around the globe. This disruption of privileged tropes in the interest of turning attention onto the transnational forces that structure inequality helps to explain James's use of "a poetics of excess". His experimentation with form functions to rework now familiar paradigms and themes that have been central to the literary imagination of postcolonial realities for a little over half a century."

=== Black Leopard, Red Wolf (2019) ===
His book Black Leopard, Red Wolf (2019) — characterized as "an African Game of Thrones— is the first instalment of a planned trilogy. It has been described by NPR journalist Ari Shapiro as "an epic fantasy quest — full of monsters, sex, and violence, set in a mythic version of ancient Africa." According to TIME magazine, the novel "joins the ranks of those by authors like Tomi Adeyemi and N. K. Jemisin, whose works push back against stereotypes about the types of figures who 'should' appear in fantasy fiction".

Warner Bros. and Michael B. Jordan's production company Outlier Society acquired the book's film rights in 2019.

=== Moon Witch, Spider King (2022) ===
The sequel to Black Leopard, Red Wolf, titled Moon Witch, Spider King, was published by Riverhead Books in 2022. The Guardian called it a "gruelling, invigorating reading experience rife with contradictions" and said it "widened the horizons of swords-and-sorcery narratives while presenting a lurid vision of Africa to rival anything in the imperialist make-believe of H. Rider Haggard".

== Influences ==
James's influences include authors as well as musicians. In his acceptance speech for the Man Booker Prize in 2015, he explained: "The reggae singers Bob Marley and Peter Tosh were the first to recognize that the voice coming out our mouths was a legitimate voice for fiction and for poetry." In his 2015 essay "From Jamaica to Minnesota to Myself", published in the New York Times Magazine, James describes reading Salman Rushdie's novel Shame (1983): "Its prose was so audacious, its reality so unhinged, that you didn't see at first how pointedly political and just plain furious it was. It made me realize that the present was something I could write my way out of."

James has said that he re-read Ben Okri's 1991 novel The Famished Road while writing Black Leopard, Red Wolf: "Okri is such an influence on me. I've read Famished Road like four times."

A lifelong fan of comics, James has cited comic characters such as "Hellboy" as an influence on his work, citing comics' ability to blend genres as an inspiration to his own approach to writing fiction.

== Tone and style ==
James's work carries a unique style, often referred to as disturbing, brutal, and violent, leading him to be compared in one review to Quentin Tarantino, who is known for his excessive use of violence in his films. James does not hold back in his graphic descriptions of sexual and violent acts, which contributes to the raw nature of his writing. "James does not set out to entertain, he does not want readers to be entertained by shocking events: he believes they should be rightly horrified…" His work is challenging and lyrical, and he often uses Jamaican Patois in dialogue, and often uses multiple dialects for different characters. His style strays from traditional and expected Caribbean literature by "creating wild and risky new possibilities for thinking about the region's place in our contemporary reality". James has stated that he commits offences in his writing that he would not allow his students to commit, "such as writing seven-page sentences." James's writing has been compared to that of Toni Morrison, William Faulkner, and Gabriel García Márquez.

== Reception ==
The reception of James's novels has been conflicted—the same elements that some critics find to be strengths, others believe are his weaknesses. The conflicting nature of how readers and reviewers respond stems from reactions to the often upfront brutality juxtaposed with the mechanical elements that James uses to tell his stories. One critic writes: "The linguistic and stylistic excess which dominates A Brief History of Seven Killings both elevates it and burdens it." Another reviewer explained, "I have had conversations with fellow Caribbeanists and students in which they have used terms like 'orgiastic' and 'masturbatory' to describe James's writing." When reviewing The Book of Night Women, another critic explains: "Rape, torture, murder and other dehumanizing acts propel the narrative, never failing to shock in both their depravity and their humanness. It is this complex intertwining that makes James's book so disturbing and so eloquent."

== Personal life ==
James's partner since 2018 is American writer Nicholas Boggs. They live in New York City.

== Awards and honours ==
Awards for James's writing
Year	Title	Award	Categ	Result	Ref
2009	The Book of Night Women	National Book Critics Circle Award	Fiction	Finalist	
2010	The Book of Night Women	Dayton Literary Peace Prize	Fiction	Won	
2010	The Book of Night Women	Minnesota Book Awards	Novel & Short Story	Won	
2010	The Book of Night Women	NAACP Image Awards	Fiction	Finalist	
2014		National Book Critics Circle Award	Fiction	Finalist	
2015	A Brief History of Seven Killings	American Book Awards	—	Won	
2015	A Brief History of Seven Killings	Andrew Carnegie Medals for Excellence	Fiction	Longlisted	
2015	A Brief History of Seven Killings	Anisfield-Wolf Book Award	Fiction	Won	
2015	A Brief History of Seven Killings	Green Carnation Prize	Fiction	Won	
2015	A Brief History of Seven Killings	Man Booker Prize	—	Won	
2015	A Brief History of Seven Killings	Minnesota Book Awards	Novel & Short Story	Won	
2015	A Brief History of Seven Killings	OCM Bocas Prize for Caribbean Literature	—	Won	
2015	A Brief History of Seven Killings	PEN/Open Book Award	—	Longlisted	
2015	A Brief History of Seven Killings	St. Francis College Literary Prize	—	Shortlisted	
2016	A Brief History of Seven Killings	International Dublin Literary Award	—	Shortlisted	
2019	Black Leopard, Red Wolf	Lambda Literary Awards	Speculative Fiction	Finalist	
2019	Black Leopard, Red Wolf	Man Booker Prize	—	Longlisted	
2019	Black Leopard, Red Wolf	National Book Award	Fiction	Finalist	
2019	Black Leopard, Red Wolf	Los Angeles Times Book Prize	Ray Bradbury Prize (Note: The name of the award was changed to the Los Angeles Times Book Prize in Science Fiction, Fantasy, and Speculative Fiction in 2024.)	Won	
2022	Moon Witch, Spider King	NAACP Image Award	Fiction	Finalist	
2026	The Disappearers	The Booker Prize	—	Shortlisted	
2026	The Disappearers	National Book Award	Fiction	Longlisted	

=== Honours ===
- 2013: Silver Musgrave Medal from the Institute of Jamaica.
- 2019: Time 100 Most Influential People.
- 2024: Royal Society of Literature International Writer.

=== End of year lists ===
- In 2019, The Guardian, Kirkus Reviews, and Shelf Awareness named Black Leopard, Red Wolf one of the best books of the year.
- In 2022, Kirkus Reviews, NPR, and Publishers Weekly named Moon Witch, Spider King one of the best books of the year.

== Works ==
=== Stand-alone literature ===
- —— (2005). John Crow's Devil (hardcover 1st ed.). Akashic Books. p. 226. ISBN 978-1888451825.
- —— (2009). The Book of Night Women (hardcover US ed.). Riverhead Books. p. 417. ISBN 978-1594488573.
- —— (2014). A Brief History of Seven Killings (hardcover ed.). Riverhead Books. p. 688. ISBN 978-1594486005.
- —— (2026). The Disappearers (hardcover ed.). Riverhead Books. p. 640. ISBN 978-0241714409.

=== The Dark Star trilogy ===
1. —— (2019). Black Leopard, Red Wolf (hardcover ed.). Riverhead Books. p. 620. ISBN 978-0735220171.
2. —— (2022). Moon Witch, Spider King (hardcover ed.). Riverhead Books. p. 626. ISBN 978-0735220201.
3. ——. White Wing, Dark Star. Riverhead Books.

=== Television ===
- Get Millie Black (2024)

== See also ==
- Caribbean literature
- Postcolonial literature
