= Geoffrey Kloske =

American book editor and publisher (born 1969)

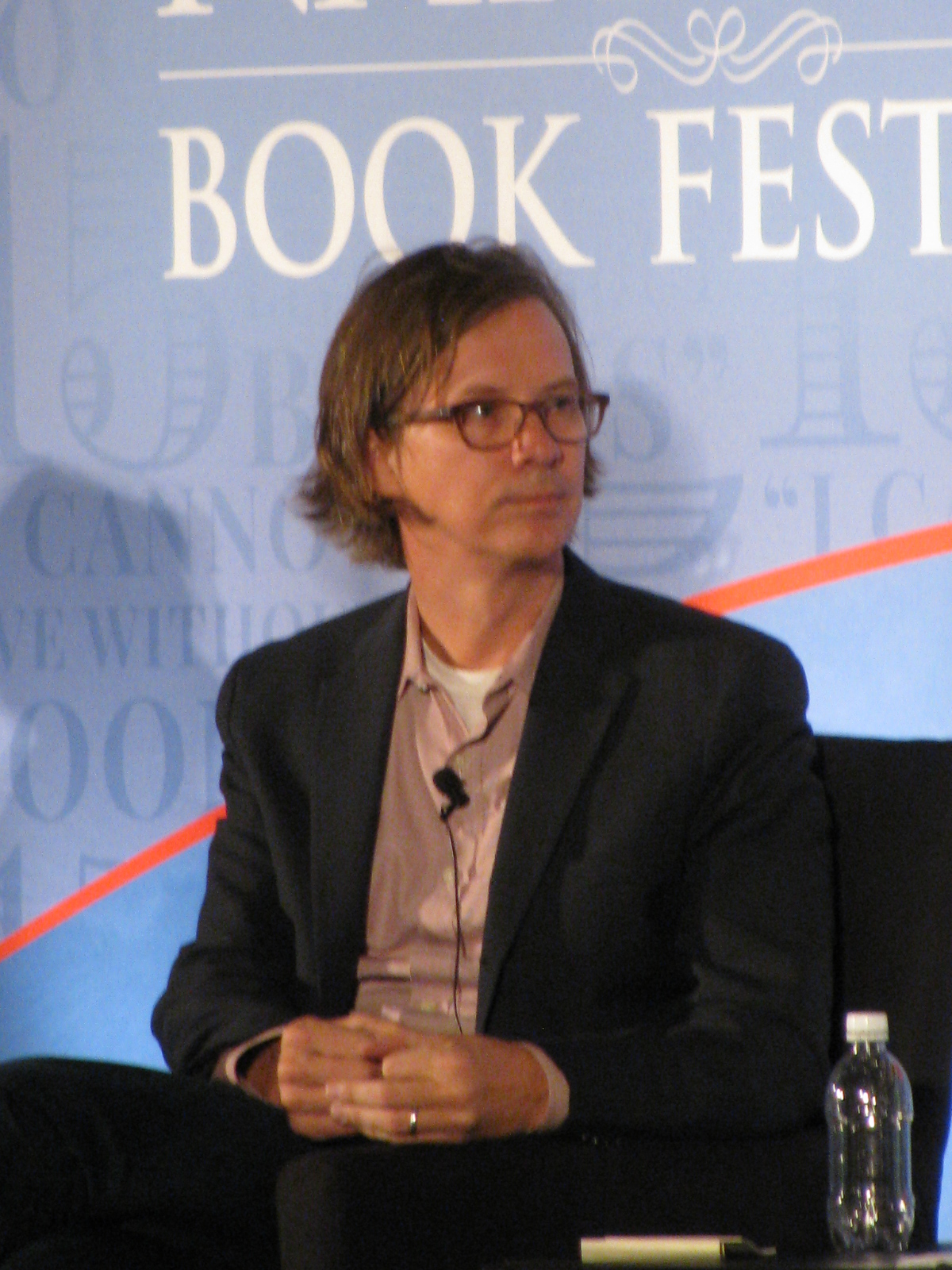
- Born: 1969 (age 56–57)
- Education: Kenyon College
- Occupations: Publisher and editor

Geoffrey Kloske (born 1969) is the president and publisher of Riverhead Books, a division of Penguin Group. He served as vice president and executive editor of Simon & Schuster from 1998 to 2006. Previously, he was an editor at Little, Brown and Company from 1992 to 1996. Authors he has edited include David Sedaris, Dave Eggers, Bob Dylan, Sarah Vowell, Jon Ronson, Nick Hornby, James McBride (writer), and Mark Kurlansky.

He was named "It" Editor by Entertainment Weekly and one of "35 under 35" by New York Magazine in 2001.

== Life ==
Kloske attended Kenyon College from 1987 to 1991. After graduating, he got his first job in the publishing industry as an editorial assistant at St. Martin's Press and worked with them from 1991 to 1992. He currently resides in Brooklyn, New York.

In 2005, he published a children's book, Once Upon a Time, the End (Asleep in 60 seconds), with illustrator Barry Blitt. The book was awarded a National Parenting Publications Award, as well as an award from Publishers Weekly.

== Fiction work ==
Once Upon a Time, the End (Asleep in 60 Seconds) (2005), with Barry Blitt, Atheneum Books for Young Readers, 2005, ISBN 9780689866197

== Edited works ==
- Lt. Col.Dave Grossman, On Killing (1995)
- David Sedaris, Barrel Fever (1994)
- David Sedaris, Naked (1998)
- Paul Begala, Is Our Children Learning?: The Case Against George W. Bush (2000)
- Dave Eggers, A Heartbreaking Work of Staggering Genius (2000)
- Viken Berberian, The Cyclist (2002)
- Bob Dylan, Chronicles: Volume One (2004)
- Walter Wager, My Side: By King Kong (2005)
- George Jonas, Vengeance: The True Story of an Israeli Counter-Terrorist Team (2005)
- G. Legman, Rationale of the Dirty Joke: An Analysis of Sexual Humor (2006)
- Sarah Vowell, Assassination Vacation (2006)
- Sarah Vowell, The Wordy Shipmates (2008)
- Sarah Vowell, Unfamiliar Fishes (2011)
- Michael D'Antonio, The State Boys Rebellion (2004)
- Michael D'Antonio, Forever Blue (2009)
- Michael D'Antonio, A Full Cup (2010)
- Lauralee Summer, Learning Joy From Dogs Without Collars (2003)
- Bernard Cooper, The Bill From My Father (2006)
- Geoff Nicholson, The Lost Art of Walking (2009)
- Steven Johnson, Everything Bad is Good for You (2006)
- Steven Johnson, The Ghost Map (2007)
- Steven Johnson, The Invention of Air (2009)
- Steven Johnson, Where Good Ideas Come From (2011)
- Steven Johnson, Future Perfect (2012)
- James McBride, Miracle at St. Anna (2008)
- James McBride, Song Yet Sung (2009)
- Nick Hornby, Slam (2007)
- Nick Hornby, Juliet Naked (2009)
- Stuart McLean, Vinyl Cafe Unplugged (2009)
- Stuart McLean, Secrets from the Vinyl Cafe (2011)
- Shalom Auslander, Foreskin's Lament (2008)
- Shalom Auslander, Hope: A Tragedy (2012)
- Mark Kurlansky, The Last Fish Tale (2009)
- Mark Kurlansky, The Food of a Younger Land (2010)
- Mark Kurlansky, Edible Stories (2010)
- Mark Kurlansky, Las Estrellas Orientales (2011)
- Mark Kurlansky, The Eastern Stars (2011)
- David Owen, The Green Metropolis (2010)
- David Owen, The Conundrum (2012)
- Jon Ronson, The Psychopath Test (2011)
- Jon Ronson, Lost at Sea (2012)
