= Riverhead Books =

American publishing company, imprint of Penguin Group

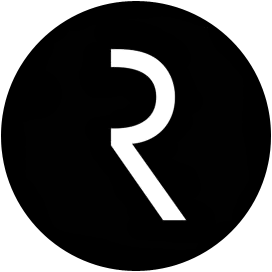
- Parent company: Penguin Group
- Founded: 1994; 31 years ago
- Founder: Susan Petersen Kennedy
- Country of origin: United States
- Headquarters location: New York City, New York, U.S.
- Publication types: Books
- Official website: www.riverheadbooks.com

Riverhead Books is an imprint of Penguin Group (USA) founded in 1994 by Susan Petersen Kennedy.

Writers published by Riverhead include Ali Sethi, Marlon James, Junot Díaz, George Saunders, Khaled Hosseini, Nick Hornby, Anne Lamott, Carlo Rovelli, Randall Munroe, Patricia Lockwood, Sarah Vowell, the Dalai Lama, Chang-rae Lee, Meg Wolitzer, Dinaw Mengestu, Daniel Alarcón, Daniel H. Pink, Steven Johnson, Jon Ronson, Ellen Burstyn, Elizabeth Gilbert, Erri De Luca, James McBride, Jing Tsu, C Pam Zhang, Garrard Conley and Nicholas Binge.

Authors published by Riverhead won the Dayton Literary Peace Prize for four out of its first six years. Four authors have won MacArthur Genius Grants and many writers Riverhead has published have given TED Talks. Riverhead authors have won PEN and other literary awards, including the Booker Prize, the Hurston/Wright Legacy Award for writers of African descent, the Stonewall Award for Gay, Lesbian, Bisexual, and Transgender fiction, and the National Book Foundation's 5 Under 35 for the best young emerging voices. Four authors were included in The New Yorker's "20 under 40" list of young fiction writers. In 2019, Riverhead author Olga Tokarczuk won the Nobel Prize in Literature.

The publisher of Riverhead is Geoffrey Kloske.
