= 2015 in literature =

This article contains information about the literary events and publications of 2015.

== Events ==
- January 7 – Charlie Hebdo shooting: An attack on the leading Franch satirical weekly kills 12 and wounds 11. This week's cover features Michel Houellebecq, whose novel Submission is published that day.
- January 21 – The British Broadcasting Corporation (BBC) launches a six-part television miniseries of Hilary Mantel's Booker Prize-winning novels Wolf Hall and Bring Up the Bodies.
- March 8 – The BBC launches a new television series of Winston Graham's Poldark novels.
- March 10 – Jacek Dukaj's cyberpunk novel The Old Axolotl is published in its original Polish version as Starość aksolotla as purely electronic literature including hypertext and 3D printable character models.
- March 19 – Kim Thúy's novel Ru wins the 2015 edition of Canada Reads.
- July 7 – Jeff Lindsay releases his final novel in the "Dexter" series, writing off Dexter Morgan two years after the final episode in the television series.
- c. October 14 – Start of Causeway Bay Books disappearances: Five staff of the political bookseller Causeway Bay Books in Causeway Bay, Hong Kong, go missing, apparently detained by mainland Chinese authorities.
- November 10 – The Bodleian Library of the University of Oxford acquires its twelve millionth book, a unique copy of Shelley's subversive Poetical Essay on the Existing State of Things "by a Gentleman of the University of Oxford", published in 1811.
- November 25 – Singapore's Media Development Authority lifts prohibitions on 240 publications under the Undesirable Publications Act.
- unknown date – English author Iain Pears' novel Arcadia is accompanied as an electronic book by an interactive app allowing readers to switch between multiple narratives.

== Anniversaries ==
- January 4 – 50th anniversary of the death of Anglo-American poet T. S. Eliot
- April 23 – Centenary of the death of English poet Rupert Brooke, on active service
- June – Centenary of the publication of T. S. Eliot's "The Love Song of J. Alfred Prufrock"
- June 10 – Centenary of Saul Bellow's birth
- June 13 – 150th anniversary of W. B. Yeats, who was born on this date in 1865
- September 26 – 75th anniversary of his death of Walter Benjamin
- October – Centenary of the publication of Franz Kafka's The Metamorphosis (Die Verwandlung).
- November 26 – 150th anniversary of the publication of Lewis Carroll's Alice's Adventures in Wonderland
- October 21 – 75th anniversary of the publication of Ernest Hemingway's For Whom the Bell Tolls
- December 21 – 75th anniversary of the death of American novelist F. Scott Fitzgerald
- December 23 – Bicentenary of the publication of Jane Austen's Emma

== New books ==
The date in brackets after a title refers to U.S. publication unless otherwise stated.

=== Fiction ===
- Rabai al-Madhoun – Destinies: Concerto of the Holocaust and the Naqba
- André Alexis – Fifteen Dogs
- Isabel Allende – El amante japonés
- Claudia Amengual – Cartagena (April 28)
- Margaret Atwood – The Heart Goes Last
- Leigh Bardugo – Six of Crows
- Paul Beatty – The Sellout (March 3)
- Pierce Brown – Golden Son (January 6)
- Graeme Macrae Burnet – His Bloody Project (UK, November 6)
- Mark Z. Danielewski
  - The Familiar, Volume 1: One Rainy Day in May (May 12)
  - The Familiar, Volume 2: Into the Forest (Oct 27)
- Mathias Énard – Boussole (Compass)
- Raymond Carver – Beginners (September 15)
- Anne Enright – The Green Road
- Jonathan Franzen – Purity (September 1)
- Paula Hawkins – The Girl on the Train (January 13)
- Lawrence Hill – The Illegal
- Michel Houellebecq - Submission (France, January 7)
- John Irving – Avenue of Mysteries (November 3)
- Kazuo Ishiguro – The Buried Giant (March 3)
- Miranda July – The First Bad Man (January 13)
- Stephen King
  - Finders Keepers (June 2)
  - The Bazaar of Bad Dreams (November 3)
- Harper Lee – Go Set a Watchman (July 14; written c.1955)
- Sarah J. Maas – A Court of Thorns and Roses
- Michael Livingston – The Shards of Heaven (November 24)
- Attica Locke – Pleasantville
- Tom McCarthy – Satin Island (UK)
- Ian McDonald – Luna: New Moon (September 17)
- Lisa McInerney – The Glorious Heresies (April)
- Henning Mankell (d. October 15) – Svenska gummistövlar (Sweden; translated as After the Fire, 2017)
- Toni Morrison – God Help the Child (April 21)
- Ottessa Moshfegh – Eileen (August)
- Haruki Murakami (村上 春樹) – Wind/Pinball: Two Novels (August 4)
- Viet Thanh Nguyen – The Sympathizer
- Chigozie Obioma – The Fishermen
- Max Porter – Grief is the Thing with Feathers (UK, September 17)
- Orhan Pamuk – A Strangeness in My Mind (October 20)
- Sunjeev Sahota – The Year of the Runaways (UK, June)
- John Scalzi – The End of All Things (August 11)
- Roger Scruton – The Disappeared (March 5)
- Adhirath Sethi – The Debt Collector´s Due (India, March 10)
- Joss Sheldon – Occupied (UK, October 20)
- Neal Stephenson – Seveneves (May 19)
- Anne Tyler – A Spool of Blue Thread
- Guy Vanderhaeghe – Daddy Lenin and Other Stories
- Sarai Walker – Dietland (May 26)
- Hanya Yanagihara – A Little Life

=== Children and young people ===
- Kevan Atteberry – Bunnies!!!
- Bob Barner – Sea Bones
- Holly Bodger – 5 to 1 (May 12)
- Janeen Brian - I’m A Hungry Dinosaur
- Sarah Crossan – One (verse, UK, August 27)
- Brian Falkner – Battlesaurus: Rampage at Waterloo
- Nadia Fink (illustrated by Pitu Saá) – Frida Kahlo for Girls and Boys (Frida Kahlo para chicas y chicos) (Argentina, June, first in Anti-Princess Series (Colección antiprincesas))
- Peter Goes – Timeline
- Jane Godwin – The True Story of Mary
- Frances Hardinge – The Lie Tree (UK, May 7)
- Hiro Kamigaki – Pierre the Maze Detective
- Moriah McStay – Everything That Makes You
- Carol Morley – 7 Miles Out
- Barry Moser – We Were Brothers
- Lesléa Newman – Ketzel, the Cat who Composed
- Jerry Pinkney – The Grasshopper & the Ants
- Rick Riordan
  - Percy Jackson's Greek Heroes (August 18)
  - The Sword of Summer (October 6)
- Rainbow Rowell – Carry On
- R. A. Spratt – Friday Barnes, Under Suspicion
- Yasmine Surovec – My Pet Human
- Lynn Weingarten – Suicide Notes from Beautiful Girls

=== Drama ===
- Annie Baker – John
- David Hare – The Moderate Soprano
- Lynn Nottage – Sweat
- Tom Stoppard – The Hard Problem (UK, February 5)

=== Non-fiction ===
- Elizabeth Alexander – The Light of the World: A Memoir
- Björk – Archives
- Carrie Brownstein – Hunger Makes Me A Modern Girl
- Noam Chomsky – Because We Say So
- Kate Christensen – How To Cook A Moose: A Culinary Memoir
- Alexa Clay and Kyra Maya Phillips – The Misfit Economy
- Ta-Nehisi Coates - Between the World and Me (July)
- Isaac Deutscher – The Prophet: The Life of Leon Trotsky
- Kim Gordon – Girl in a Band
- Greg Grandin – Kissinger's Shadow: The Long Reach of America's Most Controversial Statesman
- Chris Hedges – Wages of Rebellion: The Moral Imperative of Revolt
- Tameka Hobbs - Democracy Abroad, Lynching At Home
- Robert Hughes – The Spectacle of Skill: Selected Writings (November 17)
- W. Chan Kim and Renée Mauborgne – Blue Ocean Strategy (expanded edition)
- B. B. Lal – The Rigvedic People: Invaders? Immigrants? or Indigenous?
- Zachary Leader – The Life of Saul Bellow: To Fame and Fortune, 1915–1964
- Mark Levin – Plunder and Deceit
- Bethany McLean – Shaky Ground: The Strange Saga of the U.S. Mortgage Giants
- Alberto Manguel – Curiosity (literary criticism)
- John Marenbon – Pagans and Philosophers (March 22)
- Leslie D. Michelson – The Patient's Playbook (September)
- Minae Mizumura (translated by Mari Yoshihara and Juliet Winters Carpenter) – The Fall of Language in the Age of English
- Maggie Nelson – The Argonauts
- Jay Parini – Empire of Self: A Life of Gore Vidal
- Marilynne Robinson – The Givenness of Things: Essays (October 27)
- Oliver Sacks – Gratitude
- Ruth Scurr – John Aubrey: My Own Life
- James Shapiro – The Year of Lear: Shakespeare in 1606
- Steve Silberman – NeuroTribes: The Legacy of Autism and the Future of Neurodiversity
- Aaron Swartz – The Boy Who Could Change the World: The Writings of Aaron Swartz (November 26, UK)
- Edmund de Waal – The White Road. A Pilgrimage of Sorts (porcelain)
- Jim Wallis – America's Original Sin
- Rainn Wilson - The Bassoon King

== Films ==
- The Danish Girl

== Deaths ==
- January 1 – Miller Williams, American poet, 84 (born 1930)
- January 4 – Michele Serros, American novelist, poet, and staff writer, 48 (born 1966)
- January 10 – Robert Stone, American novelist, 77 (born 1937)
- January 12 – John Bayley, novelist and critic, 89 (born 1925)
- January 25 – John Leggett, American author and academic, 97 (born 1917)
- January 27 – Suzette Haden Elgin, American linguist and science fiction author, 78 (born 1936)
- January 28 – Lionel Gilbert, Australian historian, author, and academic, 90 (born 1924)
- January 29 – Colleen McCullough, Australian author, 77 (born 1937)
- February 6
  - André Brink, South African novelist and professor of literature, (born 1935)
  - Assia Djebar, Algerian novelist, translator and filmmaker, (born 1936)
- February 13 – Faith Bandler, Australian author and civil rights activist, 96 (born 1918)
- February 14 – Philip Levine, American poet laureate, 87 (born 1928)
- February 23 – James Aldridge, Australian-born British novelist and journalist, 96 (born 1918)
- February 26
  - Fritz J. Raddatz, German feuilleton writer, essayist and biographer (suicide, born 1931)
  - Avijit Roy, Bangladeshi-American writer, 42 (stabbed, born 1972)
- February 28 – Yaşar Kemal, Turkish writer and intellectual (born 1923)
- March 12 – Sir Terry Pratchett, English author of fantasy novels, 66 (posterior cortical atrophy, born 1948)
- March 18 – Grace Ogot, Kenyan writer, 84 (born 1930)
- March 24 – Alan Seymour, Australian playwright, 87 (born 1927)
- March 26 – Tomas Tranströmer, Swedish poet, translator, and Nobel prizewinner, 83 (born 1931)
- April 9 – Ivan Doig, American novelist, 75 (born 1939).
- April 13
  - Eduardo Galeano, Uruguayan journalist, writer and novelist, 74 (lung cancer, born 1940)
  - Günter Grass, German novelist, poet, playwright, and Nobel prizewinner, 87 (lung infection, born 1927)
- April 15 – Rosemary Tonks, English poet and novelist, 85 (born 1928)
- May 2 – Ruth Rendell, English crime and thriller writer, 85 (born 1930)
- May 2 – William Zinsser American journalist and critic (born 1922)
- May 20 – J. S. Harry, Australian poet, 76 (born 1939)
- May 23 – Moyra Caldecott, English writer, 87 (born 1927)
- June 19 – James Salter, American novelist and short-story writer, 90 (born 1925)
- July 21 – E. L. Doctorow, American novelist, 84 (born 1931)
- July 31 – Alan Cheuse, American writer and radio reviewer, 75 (born 1940)
- August 30 – Oliver Sacks, British neurologist and author (Awakenings), 82 (born 1933)
- October 2 – Brian Friel, Irish playwright and short-story writer, 86 (born 1929)
- October 5 – Henning Mankell, Swedish novelist, children’s author and playwright, 67 (born 1948)
- October 7 – W. R. Mitchell, English journalist and author, 87 (born 1928)
- October 18
  - Gamal El-Ghitani, Egyptian novelist and cultural critic, 70 (born 1945)
  - Paul West, English-born American novelist, poet and essayist, 85 (born 1930)
- October 27 – Mitzura Arghezi, Romanian book editor, illustrator, and politician (born 1924)
- November 30:
  - Dan Fante, American author and playwright, 71 (born 1944)
  - Hazel Holt, English novelist, 87 (born 1928)
- November 30 – Fatema Mernissi, Moroccan scholar and writer, 75 (born 1940)
- December 5 – William McIlvanney, Scottish novelist, short-story writer and poet, 79 (born 1936)
- December 9 – Akiyuki Nosaka, Japanese writer (Grave of the Fireflies), 85 (born 1930)
- December 16 - Peter Dickinson, English author and poet (born 1927)

== Awards ==
- Akutagawa Prize, Japan: Masatsugu Ono for 9 Nen Mae no Inori (A Prayer Nine Years Ago)
- Anisfield-Wolf Book Award, U.S.: A Brief History of Seven Killings by Marlon James
- Baileys Women's Prize for Fiction: How to Be Both by Ali Smith
- Caine Prize for African Writing: Namwali Serpell, The Sack
- Camões Prize, Portugal: Hélia Correia
- David Cohen Prize: Tony Harrison
- Dayne Ogilvie Prize, Canada: Alex Leslie
- Desmond Elliott Prize, U.K.: Our Endless Numbered Days by Claire Fuller
- DSC Prize for South Asian Literature: The Lowland by Jhumpa Lahiri, India
- Folio Prize, U.K.: Family Life by Akhil Sharma
- European Book Prize: Jean-Pierre Orban, Vera and, Robert Menasse, Der Europäische Landbote
- Friedenspreis des Deutschen Buchhandels: Navid Kermani
- German Book Prize: Die Erfindung der Roten Armee Fraktion durch einen manisch-depressiven Teenager im Sommer 1969 by Frank Witzel
- Golden Wreath of Struga Poetry Evenings, Macedonia: Bei Dao (China)
- Goldsmiths Prize, U.K.: Beatlebone by Kevin Barry
- Gordon Burn Prize, U.K.: In Plain Sight: The Life and Lies of Jimmy Savile by Dan Davies
- Governor General's Award for English-language fiction, Canada: Guy Vanderhaeghe, Daddy Lenin and Other Stories
- Governor General's Award for French-language fiction, Canada: Nicolas Dickner, Six degrés de liberté
- Grand Prix du roman de l'Académie française: Les Prépondérants by Hédi Kaddour; 2084: la fin du monde by Boualem Sansal
- International Prize for Arabic Fiction: The Italian by Shukri Mabkhout, Tunisia
- International Dublin Literary Award: Harvest by Jim Crace
- Kerry Group Irish Fiction Award: Blue Is the Night by Eoin McNamee
- Man Booker Prize: A Brief History of Seven Killings by Marlon James
- Miguel de Cervantes Prize: Fernando del Paso
- Miles Franklin Award: The Eye of the Sheep by Sofie Laguna
- National Book Award for Fiction, U.S.: Fortune Smiles By Adam Johnson
- Nobel Prize in Literature: Svetlana Alexievich, Belarus
- PEN/Faulkner Award for Fiction: Preparation for the Next Life by Atticus Lish
- PEN Center USA 2015 Fiction Award: Robert Thomas, Bridge
- Premio Planeta de Novela, Spain: Hombres desnudos by Alicia Giménez-Bartlett; La isla de Alice by Daniel Sánchez Arévalo
- Premio Strega, Italy: Nicola Lagioia
- Pritzker Literature Award for Lifetime Achievement in Military Writing, U. S.: David Hackett Fischer
- Prix Goncourt: Boussole by Mathias Énard
- Pulitzer Prize for Fiction, U.S.: All the Light We Cannot See by Anthony Doerr
- Pulitzer Prize for Poetry: U.S.: Digest by Gregory Pardlo
- RBC Taylor Prize, Canada: They Left Us Everything by Plum Johnson
- Rogers Writers' Trust Fiction Prize, Canada: André Alexis, Fifteen Dogs
- Russian Booker Prize: Vera by Alexander Snegirev
- SAARC Literary Award: Sitakant Mahapatra, Selina Hossain, Suman Pokhrel, Nisar Ahmad Chaudhary, Aryan Aroon
- Samuel Johnson Prize for Non-fiction, U.K.: Neurotribes: The Legacy of Autism and How to Think Smarter About People Who Think Differently by Steve Silberman
- Scotiabank Giller Prize, Canada: André Alexis, Fifteen Dogs
- Walter Scott Prize for Historical Fiction, U.K.: The Ten Thousand Things by John Spurling
- Whiting Awards, U.S.: Fiction: Leopoldine Core, Dan Josefson, Azareen Van der Vliet Oloomi; Nonfiction: Elena Passarello; Plays: Lucas Hnath, Anne Washburn; Poetry: Anthony Carelli, Aracelis Girmay, Jenny Johnson, Roger Reeves
- W. Y. Boyd Literary Award for Excellence in Military Fiction, U.S.: Redeployment by Phil Klay
- Zbigniew Herbert International Literary Award: Ryszard Krynicki

== See also ==
- 2015 in Australian literature
- 2015 in Japanese literature
