= King Tone =

American gang leader

Antonio Fernandez, also known as King Tone, is the former head of the Latin Kings. In 1999, Fernandez was sentenced to 12 to 15 years for conspiring to sell narcotics. He is the main figure in the HBO documentary, Latin Kings: A Street Gang story, which was released in 2004. He is also featured in the book, The Misfit Economy, by Alexa Clay, which was published in 2015. Upon his release, Fernandez has shared his insights as a former gang leader and political activist, and how that relates to the "legitimate world".

== Latin Kings ==
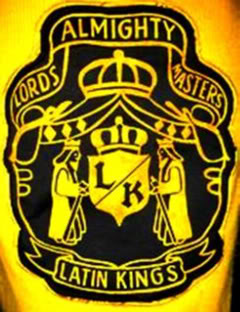
Latin Kings patch

In 1997, a few months after his appointment as leader of the Latin Kings, The New York Times posed the question whether Fernandez was a "Man of Vision or of Violence." They concluded he was the former, a man with the self-assigned mission of transforming the Latin Kings from an organized crime syndicate to a political movement, fighting for social justice on behalf of suppressed Latin American communities.

He seemed set for a life of addiction and crime until he went to prison and found solace in a gang. He saw something in the criminal organisation that others didn't - a place that offered the structure and love that he needed to beat addiction. From his own experiences he knew the Latin Kings had more to offer. Mirroring the activism of groups such as the Young Lords and the Black Panthers, he wanted to reform and rebrand the Latin Kings and its 7,000 members. He united the divided sects of the gang and presented his ideas at local meetings, building the new principles of the Latin Kings from the ground up. He had former gang members canvass for politicians and feed the homeless. The younger members were given curfews and sheltered from elder members who were entrenched in crime. The police called him a "gangster with a PR campaign," but to many he was a symbol of hope.

=== Latin Kings: A Street Gang story ===
In 2003, HBO released a documentary called "Latin Kings: A Street Gang story", which was primarily a biography of Fernandez. Created by award-winning documentary maker Jon Alpert, it depicts two sides to Fernandez' role as head of the Latin Kings. It portrays him as a symbol of hope who empowered the Latin American Community, and increased the King's membership by more than a 1000 people. It also portrays him as a man who could not practice what he preached. Despite asking his Latin King members to find legitimate employment and to reject a life of crime, he continued to use his position as leader of the Latin Kings to assist in large scale narcotic transactions.

=== Misfit Economy ===
Fernandez was featured in the 2015 book, The Misfit Economy, by best selling author Alexa Clay. The book explains how his approach to managing the Latin Kings is transferable to the "legitimate economy".
