= Lynching of Cellos Harrison =

African American who was lynched in the U.S.

Cellos Harrison was an African American man in Marianna, Florida who was lynched on June 16, 1943, after being rearrested when his murder conviction was overturned by the Supreme Court of Florida because his confession was obtained under duress. He was twice convicted by an all-white jury of murdering a white man who was working as a gas station attendant and store clerk. State and federal investigations were launched into the lynching but no one was ever indicted or convicted. A decade earlier Claude Neal was lynched in Marianna. The area was also wrought by a wave of violence against African Americans and Republicans during the Reconstruction Era after the American Civil War in what is known as the Jackson County War.

Harrison, a farm worker, was convicted of killing gas station attendant Johnnie Mayo in 1940. His conviction was overturned when his confession was thrown out on appeal. Cellos was reindicted and then taken from the Jackson County, Florida jail by four masked men and killed by a blow or blows to the head. His body was found 5 miles outside Marianna.

NAACPstate president Harry T. Moore, who was later assassinated in a 1951 bombing of his home, wrote a letter to Florida governor Spessard Holland calling for an investigation and one was ordered.

Tameka Bradley Hobbs wrote about this and three other lynchings in her 2015 book Democracy Abroad, Lynching at Home: Racial Violence in Florida.
