= The Patient's Playbook =

2015 book by Leslie D. Michelson

The Patient's Playbook: How To Save Your Life and the Lives of Those You Love
- First edition cover
- Author: Leslie D. Michelson
- Language: English
- Subject: Navigating healthcare
- Publisher: Alfred A. Knopf
- Publication date: September 2015
- Publication place: United States
- Media type: Print (hardback and paperback)
- Pages: 336 pages
- ISBN: 978-0-385-35228-4
- OCLC: 911255286
- Dewey Decimal: 610.696
- LC Class: R727.45 .M53 2015

The Patient's Playbook: How To Save Your Life and the Lives of Those You Love is a book by American health administrator Leslie D. Michelson published in 2015 by Alfred A. Knopf. It encourages patients to be proactive in their healthcare interactions. The book describes an approach similar to that used by Michelson's firm.

The book advises patients how to evaluate a primary care physician, how to find specialists, how to seek second opinions and how to avoid diagnostic errors and overtreatment. Michelson supplements his advice with case studies from real patients and included checklists. The book received mixed reviews, with some critics commending it for being easy to understand and having useful advice. Other reviewers noted that the book lacked empirical evidence and had potentially unrealistic expectations for everyday readers. An audiobook was released in 2015 by Books on Tape.

== Biographical background and publication ==
Leslie D. Michelson was born in 1950 or 1951 and was raised in Union, New Jersey. When he was a 17-year-old high school student, Michelson had an experience that made him become skeptical of physicians' diagnoses. Although his father had few major symptoms, medical professionals informed him that open-heart surgery was necessary. Michelson contacted Lenox Hill Hospital, where he arranged for its cardiology department's chairman to review the case. In his second opinion, the cardiologist said his father had just a harmless heart murmur and did not need the procedure. Michelson said, "My dad didn't have the surgery, he lived almost 40 more years, and his entire life, never had any heart problems". He concluded, "If my father had undergone surgery, he might have died right there on the table."

Michelson completed his undergraduate studies at Johns Hopkins University, received a degree from Yale Law School, and when he was just starting out, he did a stint at the United States Department of Health and Human Services. Serving the pharmaceutical industry, a company he founded oversaw clinical trials. Michelson established a second company that enlisted physicians and their patients to become clinical trial participants. At the beginning of the 2000s, he served as the Prostate Cancer Foundation's chief executive officer. Michelson said in 2015 that roughly 400,000 deaths in the United States each year are linked to avoidable mistakes in medical care. He cited both his father's medical experience and such statistics as why he started Private Health Management. The company has locations in Los Angeles's Century City and Manhattan's Park Avenue. It charges a premium rate—sometimes reaching tens of thousands of dollars—to find answers for patients, frequently after they have seen multiple doctors without getting a clear diagnosis. After the company collects a customer's medical records, it identifies specialists who focus on the individual's specific illness, frequently arranging consultations with renowned medical professionals. In some cases, the patient receives an accurate diagnosis but is given the wrong treatment. In other cases, the diagnosis is wrong.

When Michelson wrote the book, he was a resident of Los Angeles and had spent 30 years in the health administration field across a range of functions. He was Private Health Management's founder, chairman, and chief executive officer. For at least 10 years, he provided a concierge-style service through handling challenging health issues for mostly wealthy clients. To promote informed health decision-making, Michelson regularly engaged with the press, gave public talks, and created a PBS special. Michelson penned The Patient's Playbook, which describes an approach similar to how his firm assists clients and guides readers through how to proactively handle medical issues. The book was published in September 2015 by Alfred A. Knopf. A Canadian edition was published and contained a preface that discussed the 2004 Canadian Adverse Events Survey. Ed Rendell, the governor of Pennsylvania, hosted Michelson to discuss the book at the Free Library of Philadelphia on September 17, 2015.

== Style ==
Library Journal's Laurie Selwyn found that through leveraging sequential checklists and true stories, the book "flows smoothly and easily". The book concludes every chapter with a "Quick Guide", which Elizabeth J. Eastwood of the Library Journal found to be "handy". She noted that the guide compiles the chapter's key recommendations and features doctors' guidance such as "How To Cold-Call a Physician". Yellowknifer's Deborah Bruser said that the "Quick Guide" enabled the book to be "never overwhelming" despite covering a substantial amount of information.

The Sarasota Herald-Tribune reviewer Barbara Peters called the work a "how-to book" that differs from others in the genre. She said that "thick with advice and instructions", it calls on readers to put in substantial effort to navigate a high-cost, poorly coordinated healthcare system to secure the optimal diagnosis and treatment. Aiming to equip people for medical readiness, the author incorporates real-life patient narratives throughout his book. In warning against hastily starting medical treatment, he relates how a man saw another physician after experiencing shortness of breath. Despite having not received a detailed medical assessment yet, he received an angiogram and stents were placed in his heart arteries. The stents turned out to be unwarranted since his medical issue lay in his lungs, not his heart.

== Content ==
According to Michelson, "there is no map" for patients who face a severe medical condition. No individual possesses the requisite energy, details, and time to organize their treatment. Michelson notes that when faced with a medical condition, numerous patients "behave as if they were powerless" by being in a hurry to leave or by complying without question. He urges healthcare users and their family and friends to actively manage their health and medical conditions. Michelson advises patients to educate themselves on their afflictions and seek clarity from their doctors. He encourages patients to reach the "no mistake zone" and outlines the four stages of "Intensive Case Management": immersion, diagnosis, treatment, and coordination.

The book explores how patients can evaluate primary care physicians to find the best fit for their needs. They should identify the key characteristics they value, collect endorsements, and speak with the candidates. The author says that after finding a quality primary care physician, it is crucial to form a solid and involved relationship. This is because patients with such relationships are more prone to undergo the recommended preventive screenings and are more likely to be candid to trusted doctors about their vital medical information. Every day, primary care physicians generally handle between 20 and 40 patients. To receive timely, top-tier care, he said patients could spend more on being seen by a concierge physician.

The book provides guidance on choosing the right specialist in a particular affliction. Michelson suggests that patients avoid community hospitals in favor of leading medical facilities when undergoing complicated health interventions. He advises people confronting complex health problems to find medical professionals who have devoted their careers to studying the illness they have. These super-specialists typically work at leading university-affiliated hospitals. He supports patients obtaining second opinions since no fewer than 80,000 Americans die or become disabled owing to diagnostic error. He tells patients to assemble a care team, to compile detailed medical histories about themselves, and to find a "health care quarterback" who will stand up for their best interests.

Michelson advises patients to learn about their medical issues through consulting UpToDate and the National Institutes of Health. Other areas explored are creating a plan for possible emergency room admissions such as determining the hospital to be admitted to and avoiding overtreatment such as needless interventions and unwarranted tests. He explores how in some cases, specialists continually refer patients to specialists in different fields. The book provides guidance about what to do in the case of a medical emergency and how to facilitate communication across various healthcare practitioners. Michelson advises patients to be attentive at the hospital, noting that over 10% of patients experience complications caused by their stay. He advises patients to demand immediate attention when there is an onset of symptoms like pain and to understand why any medications or treatments are being recommended before agreeing to them. Michelson suggests sharing a concise medical summary at their bedside and connecting with the healthcare workers in a way that reminds them they are a person, not just a medical case. He encourages patients to remember they have the final say. For example, if admitted to a teaching hospital, they should feel empowered to voice any objections such as discomfort with a medical student's performing a medical procedure. When a patient senses they are being dismissed or not receiving proper care, they should request to speak to the "senior administrator in charge", who supervises the medical center outside regular hours.

The book features stories from real patients, substituting pseudonyms for their names. In one case, he shares a story about a two-day-old with jaundice. Her parents took her to the emergency room of the same hospital of her birth. But that facility's medical professionals had limited exposure to pediatric cases, having primarily taken care of adults. He advises against counting on alternative medicine, citing the case of Steve Jobs who delayed treatment by nine months after being found to have pancreatic cancer that was possibly treatable. The cancer had already metastasized to his liver when he finally underwent surgery.

== Reception ==
Laurie Selwyn of Library Journal recommended the book to medical trainees and to recipients of medical care. She said that it offers much-needed guidance for people who face the confusing maze of the American healthcare system. The magazine's Elizabeth J. Eastwood said that in a field filled with similar works, the book has "a beneficial point of view and achievable goals" and is "fluid, informative, and educated". Booklist reviewer Tony Miksanek called the book "unique and useful" and "an invaluable resource" in guiding people through the intricate, frequently daunting realities of being sick. He praised the book for covering the "intriguing and important concepts" like "treatment fatigue", "emotional vulnerability", and the "specialist shuffle" where patients are endlessly referred from one specialist to another.

David A. Shaywitz, the chief medical officer of DNAnexus and a visiting professor at Harvard University's Department of Biomedical Informatics, penned a mostly positive review of the book in The Wall Street Journal. He said that although Michelson argues that patients get better results through his methods, his justification is based on stories rather than empirical evidence. Citing the top healthcare providers Kaiser Permanente and ChenMed, Shaywitz said those groups would maintain that their clients likely achieve outcomes comparable to those of Michelson's "tiger patients" while avoiding the heightened monetary and psychological strain likely linked to Michelson's strategy. According to Shaywitz, the book "isn't offering policy; it's offering practical advice" that doctors follow once a family member becomes ill. He called it "a timely reminder" that it's important to remember that medicine's main objective is to provide "the best possible care to each individual patient".

KFF Health News writer Julie Appleby thought that Michelson's advice to approach leading health authorities "may prove daunting or unrealistic for the average consumer". Barbara Peters Smith of the Sarasota Herald-Tribune had a similar view, stating that readers likely would not "try all the tricks he recommends". She said, however, that "his insights about the importance of getting your caregivers to notice and talk to you is invaluable". AARP named the book among 2015's best books, saying since everyone encounters health issues, "you need this guide". According to AARP, "Michelson details, step by crucial step, how to navigate the terrifying world of doctors, hospitals, second opinions, drug trials and insurance so you get lifesaving results."

Kirkus Reviews said it was a "useful book" that gives people a greater voice in their care, moving them from passive recipients to active participants. Calling the book "highly readable", Deborah Bruser of Yellowknifer said the ideas conveyed are "holistic and validating" and found the anecdotes that reinforced Michelson's arguments to be "fascinating". Hood County News reviewer Bobbie Brownlee called it "a well-organized and very helpful book" that provides "the most effective techniques" for obtaining the optimal medical intervention.

== Audiobook adaptation ==
Books on Tape published the audiobook adaptation in 2015, narrated by the author, Leslie D. Michelson. The recording spans 10 CDs with a total runtime of 10 hours and 48 minutes. Library Journal's Laurie Selwyn said that by being "professional, nicely paced", the author makes a potentially daunting topic an informative, engaging, and accessible learning opportunity.

== Bibliography ==
- Schwartz, Nelson D. (2020). The Velvet Rope Economy: How Inequality Became Big Business. New York: Anchor Books. pp. 136–141. ISBN 978-0-525-43565-5 – via Google Books.
