= Flight 502 =

Flight 502 may refer to the following accidents and incidents involving commercial airliners:

- Lufthansa Flight 502, which crashed on 11 January 1959 on final approach, near Flecheiras Beach just short of the runway, killing 36 people.
- LANSA Flight 502, which crashed on 9 August 1970, killing 101 people.

== Other ==
- Murder on Flight 502, 1975 film.
