= Lynching of Willie James Howard =

1944 killing in Florida

Willie James Howard
- Born: July 13, 1928; Live Oak, Florida, U.S.
- Died: January 2, 1944 (aged 15); Live Oak, Florida, U.S.
- Cause of death: Drowning
- Known for: Victim of drowning

Willie James Howard (July 13, 1928 – January 2, 1944) was a 15-year-old African-American teenager living in Live Oak, Suwannee County, Florida. He was drowned for having given Christmas cards to all his co-workers at the Van Priest Dime Store, including Cynthia Goff, a white girl, followed by a letter to her on New Year's Day.

== New Year's Day letter ==
The New Year's Day letter read:

Dear Friend,

Just a few line[s] to let you hear from me [.] I am well an[d] hope you are the same. This is what I said on that [C]hristmas card. From W. J. H. With L. [love] I hope you will understand what I mean. That is what I said[.] [N]ow please don't get angry with me because you can never tell what may get in some body[.] I did not put it in there my self. God did[.] I can't help what he does[,] can I[?] I know you don't think much of our kind of people but we don't hate you all[.] [W]e want to be your all friends but you [won't] let us [.] [P]lease don't let any body see this[.] I hope I haven't made you [mad.] [I]f I did tell me about it an[d] I will [forget] about it. I wish this was [a] northern state[.] I guess you call me fresh. Write an[d] tell me what you think of me[,] good or bad. Sincerely yours, with, [sic]
From Y.K.W.
Fo[r] Cynthia Goff

I love your name. I love your voice, for a S.H. [sweetheart] you are my choice.

== Reaction to letter and death of Willie James Howard ==
It is unknown whether Cynthia had given the letter to her father or he found it on his own, but Alex P. "Phil" Goff, the Live Oak postmaster and a former state legislator, discovered the letter and flew into a rage.

Goff, along with S. B. McCullers and Reg H. Scott, went to Willie's house and took the youth from his mother at gunpoint. They picked up Willie's father, James Howard, at the Bond-Howell Lumber Company where he worked, then drove to the Suwannee River east of Suwannee Springs, where they bound Willie by the hands and feet, and forced the youth to choose between getting shot and jumping into the Suwannee River. After his father said he could do nothing to save him, Willie jumped into the river and drowned. Goff, McCullers, and Scott signed an affidavit which stated that they had only wanted James Howard to whip his son and, rather than be whipped by his father, Willie had committed suicide by jumping into the river. James Howard also signed the affidavit, but after selling his home and moving to Orlando, he recanted. Harry T. Moore, of the NAACP, interviewed the parents. After a county grand jury failed to indict, Moore was able to get a federal investigation started, but no convictions followed. Goff, McCullers, and Scott died without having to face murder charges.

Cynthia Goff was stated to have been very distraught over the death of Howard, not "intend[ing] for that to happen".

== Aftermath ==
A documentary film, Murder on the Suwanee: The Willie James Howard Story (2009) by filmmaker Isaac Brown, and produced by historian Marvin Dunn, tried to get Charlie Crist, then attorney general and later governor of Florida, to reopen the case, but to no avail; neither was his case investigated under the Emmett Till Unsolved Civil Rights Crime Act. It is frequently cited as comparable to the case of Emmett Till, who was also lynched (at age 14) for allegedly making advances at a white woman at a grocery store.

Tameka Hobbs wrote about the lynching and three other lynchings in her 2015 book Democracy Abroad, Lynching at Home: Racial Violence in Florida.

== See also ==
- List of unsolved murders (1900–1979)
