= Susy Shock =

Argentine actress, writer, and singer (born 1968)

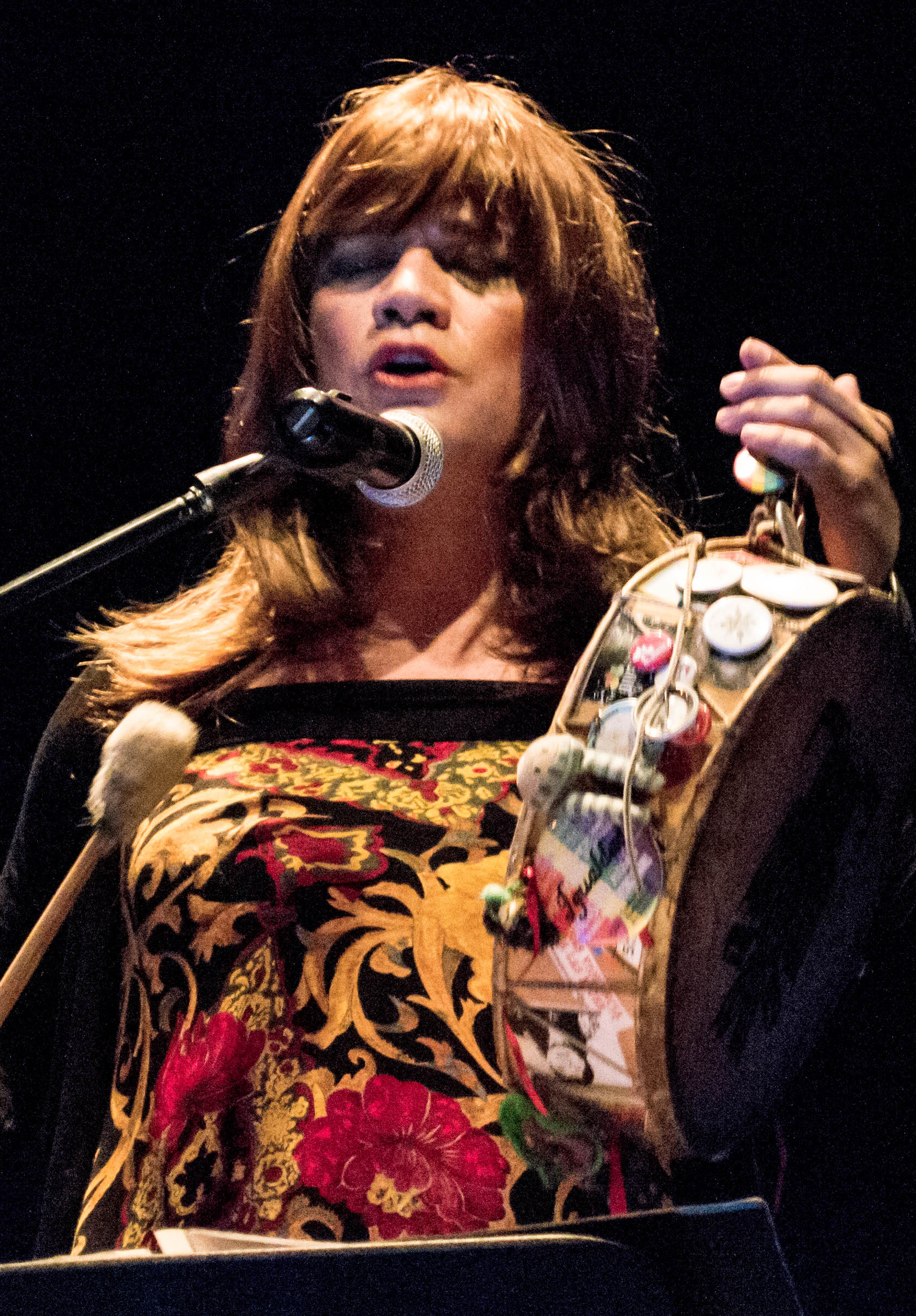
- Born: 6 December 1968 (age 57); Buenos Aires, Argentina
- Occupations: Actress, writer, singer, activist
- Website: susyshock.com.ar

Susy Shock (born 6 December 1968) is an Argentine actress, writer, singer, and activist who defines herself as a "trans sudaca artist".

== Biography ==
Susy Shock was born in the neighborhood of Balvanera, in the center of Buenos Aires, to a father from La Pampa Province and mother from Tucumán.

Shock began theater at the age of 14, where she started to write and sing for the stage.

Beginning her career as a writer, she published her first book Revuelo Sur in 2007. In 2011 she published Poemario trans pirado and Relatos en Canecalón. She wrote columns for Soy – the diversity supplement of the Argentine newspaper Página/12.

She contributed to cultural magazines such as Caja Muda (from the National University of Córdoba), Waska, Queer ArtZine, Ají (from Ushuaia), and Colada.

Some of her texts were part of the compilation La bombacha apretaba sus testículos. She toured across the country and Latin America with the poetic musical recital Poemario Trans Pirado.

The number 1 issue of Clítoris Magazine (2011), featured the cartoon "SuperShiva" by Susy Shock and Rubén Gauna. According to the specialized blog AV Comics, it tells "the story of a transvestite immigrant who faces double intolerance. The story has the intelligence to propose itself as an analogy with the double life of superheroes who must carry a 'secret identity'. Something that, in short, is what happens to the protagonist."

She currently writes columns every month for MU Magazine (of the Lavaca cooperative) and a serial novel – published in Maten al Mensajero – entitled La Loreta. Beginning in November 2013, she appeared in the radio series Crianzas, produced by the Lavaca cooperative.

== Activism ==
Shock was part of the National Front for the Gender Identity Law, an alliance of more than fifteen organizations promoting the sanction at the national level of a law that guarantees the adaptation of all personal documents to the gender identity and the name chosen by people, and access to medical treatments for those who request interventions on their body.

The Gender Identity Law was approved by the Argentine parliament on 9 May 2012 and promulgated by President Cristina Fernández de Kirchner a few days later, becoming one of the most progressive laws on the subject at an international level.

== Books ==
- Revuelo sur (poetry collection), Buenos Aires: Nuevos Tiempos, 2007
- Poemario Trans Pirado, with illustrations by Enrique Gurpegui and prologue by Marlene Wayar, Buenos Aires: Nuevos Tiempos, 2011, ISBN 978-987-1399-25-3
- Relatos en Canecalón, with prologue by Fernando Noy, Buenos Aires: Nuevos Tiempos, 2011, ISBN 978-987-1399-26-0
- Crianzas, with illustrations by Anahí Bazán Jara and prologues by Marlene Wayar and Claudia Acuña, Buenos Aires: Editorial Muchas Nueces, 2016, ISBN 978-987-45857-3-8
- Hojarascas, with photographs by "M.A.f.I.A." Buenos Aires: Editorial Muchas Nueces, 2017, ISBN 978-987-45857-7-6
- Susy Shock para chicxs, by Nadia Fink and Pitu Saá, Buenos Aires: Chirimbote, 2018, ISBN 978-987-42-5955-4
- Realidades, 2020.

== Film ==
In 2013, Susy Shock starred in Andrea. Un melodrama rioplatense, directed by Édgar De Santo. The film was presented at various international festivals during 2014, including the Pink Latino Film Festival in Toronto and the Gay Pride Festival in Rio de Janeiro.

In 2016, she premiered Deconstrucción, crónicas de Susy Shock, directed by Sofia Bianco. It won Best Musical Band at the "Primeiro Plano" Juiz de Fora Festival in Brazil, Best National Short Film and Audience Award at the Queer de la Plata Festival in Argentina, and special mention at the Soria Festival in Buenos Aires and the 12th Mar del Plata International Independent Film Festival (MARFICI).

== Music ==
In November 2014, Shock released her first album entitled Buena vida y poca vergüenza and began a tour of the country and Latin America.

Her other albums include:

- Traviarca (2018).
- Crianzas - El Musical (2022).
- Revuelo Sur (2024).

== Awards and distinctions ==
On 29 April 2014, Poemario Trans Pirado was recognized by the Buenos Aires City Legislature, declared of cultural interest for the promotion and defense of human rights.

In December 2015, she received a special mention for her song "Con mi carro Voy" at the 2011–2014 National Tango and Folklore Award show.

In November 2017, she received the Women's Agenda Foundation's annual recognition in gender.

== Private life ==
Susy Shock has one daughter, born in 1991. She lives with her partners Eduardo and Mauricio.
