= Susana Soca =

Uruguayan poet-writer

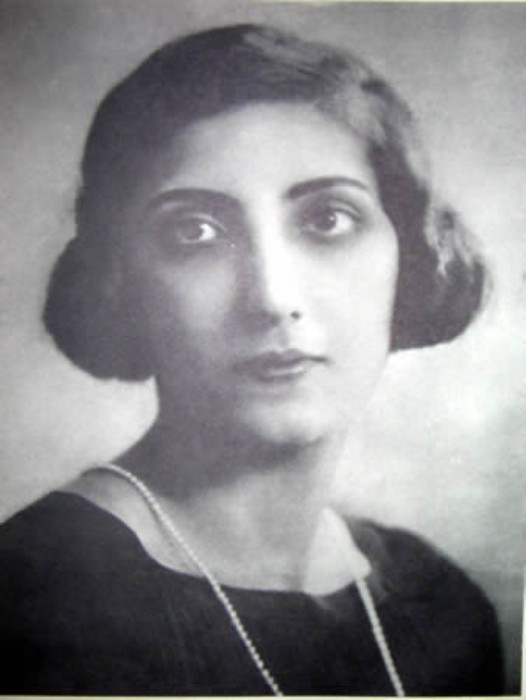
Susana Soca

Susana Soca (1906–1959) was a Uruguayan poet-writer. During the most productive part of her public career, much of which coincided with the Second World War, she lived in France. Soca also founded and for many years produced the transatlantic literary journal La Licorne. Both in her journal and elsewhere she was notable for the extent and effectiveness of her support for fellow writers from Latin America and Europe.

She died near Rio de Janeiro airport when the Lockheed airliner on which she was a passenger crashed, killing all 29 passengers and 7 of the 10 crew members.

== Biography ==
=== Provenance and early years ===
Susana Luisa María de las Mercedes Soca was born at her parents' home in Montevideo. She was baptised a few days before her second birthday at Notre-Dame (cathedral) in Paris during a family trip to Europe. Susana's father was not particularly religious but her mother was a deeply committed Roman Catholic. As a young man Francisco Soca had studied medicine in Paris, where he had successfully submitted his doctoral dissertation in 1888.

Susana Soca was her parents' only recorded child. In a country with a relatively small ruling élite, the family into which she was born was rich and well connected. Francisco Soca's family came originally from the Canary Islands. He was a physician who for very many years held the chair of clinical medicine at the university, and who also involved himself increasingly in national politics. He enjoyed an excellent professional reputation among Montevideo's leading families, and it was during a house visit to treat the wife of Juan Carlos Blanco Fernández (1847–1910), Luisa Acevedo de Blanco that he met one of his patient's daughter, Luisa Blanco Acevedo. Despite a 26-year difference in their ages, Francisco Soca and Luisa Blanco Acevedo married in a civil ceremony at the Acevedo family home on the night of 5/6 April 1905. The religious ceremony was held in the cathedral the next day, and the couple then departed for a trip to Europe. The Acevedos were an old and large family. Through her mother's aristocratic connections Susana Soca grew up in Montevideo with many influential kinsfolk such as her uncle, the writer and Uruguayan senator Eduardo Acevedo Díaz who had signed as a witness on her parents' marriage certificate.

As a child Susana Soca frequently accompanied her father when he went to visit patients in their homes. Marta Behrens later told an interviewer how she remembered seeing a little girl sitting in the doctor's car outside the house when she went to visit her grandmother. Evidently the child was very interested in the old lady's illness because she came along with her father "every day". She never got out of the car, however, but remained in the back seat reading a book. Behrens remembered Soca, who must have been around twelve at the time, sitting in the car in the fading evening light with a face that "showed sadness". She was educated at home, always in French, by a succession of private tutors. The first of them was her mother's sister, Maruja Blanco, the wife of Julio Raúl Mendilaharsu. Early on Susana Soca mastered various languages: Spanish, French, English, German, Latin, Italian, Greek and subsequently Russian. Probably around 1938 she met Boris Pasternak through mutual friends in Paris. Travel became difficult in Europe over the next few years, and much of their subsequent friendship was conducted by letter, as a result of which Soca was able greatly to improve her Russian. Soca played a part in concealing the manuscript of Doctor Zhivago (which had been refused publication in the Soviet Union), though the extent of her involvement remains contested.

=== Contacts ===
Soca knew many leading contemporary Uruguayan writers. These included the poet-professors María Eugenia Vaz Ferreira and Orfila Bardesio, the poet-essayist Carlos Sabat Ercasty, the distinguished writer Jules Supervielle and the author Carlos Reyles. There were frequent visits to Paris, initially with her parents and then, as she grew older, on her own.

In 1936 the Franco-Belgian polymath-writer Henri Michaux met Susana Soca, by now aged 30, in Argentina or Uruguay. Attraction was clearly mutual and an intense relationship ensued. In the end, however, Soca preferred to stay with her widowed mother, which at least one French language source links with the fact that she had inherited her mother's deep commitment to the church. In any event, there was no marriage.

=== A ten year trip to Paris ===
Towards the end of 1938, Soca made one of her regular visits to Paris. She was accompanied by her mother. They stayed at the Plaza Athénée (hotel). Later they took a suite at the Hotel George V. 1939 was a year of mounting international tension, especially in Europe, and by the time the women were ready to return to Uruguay the Second World War had broken out. They found themselves stuck in Paris. On 3 September 1939, France and Britain declared war on Germany: on the streets of Paris and London eerily little changed, as the governments in those cities waited to see what Hitler would do next. The answer arrived on 10 May 1940 when the German army invaded and quickly overran the northern half of France. A month later they reached Paris, which was formally surrendered on 14 June 1940. The German high command installed themselves in the Hotel George V. It was necessary for hotel guests to find alternative accommodation. Soca and her mother moved to the Grand Ritz Hotel in the Place Vendôme at the city's heart. However, by now it was becoming clear that they would not be returning to Uruguay any tome soon, and they subsequently took an apartment in the affluent Passy quarter.

Sources are largely silent as to how, in Paris, Susana Soca spent the war years themselves. It is clear that she began to write poetry in Spanish. As she would later explain in the foreword to her 1959 poetry collection "En un país de la memoria", this provided a route by which she was able to find her personal identity and her homeland in the Spanish language. Sources also suggest that well before 1945 she was already working on plans for the launch and operation of her own literary journal.

=== La Licorne ===
After the war Susana Soca founded Cahiers de La Licorne (literally, "notebooks of the unicorn"), a French conceived transatlantic literary journal designed and presented as a twice yearly periodical-anthology. The first edition, published in Paris, appeared in March 1947. The cover featured a unicorn based drawing by Valentine Hugo which referenced the Monoceros (unicorn) constellation. Inside many of the various features also benefited from characteristically stylised illustrations by Hugo, who also contributed a number of pictures of Soca herself and of Luisa Blanco Acevedo de Soca, Susana's mother. A second edition appeared in December 1947 and a third in Autumn/Fall 1948. It provided a publication space for European authors who had been silent during the war or whose works had been overlooked. Some of the first French authors features were Paul Éluard, Maurice Blanchot, Roger Caillois, René Char, René Daumal and Jean Paulhan. Soca published literary texts, essays and poems from some of the twentieth century's most important writers and intellectuals. She also contributed numerous literary essays of her own, notably about European authors and artists. The focus was largely on timeless aspects of the arts, as far as possible set apart from political ideologies and involvement. There was also a cohort of Latin American writers, hitherto unknown in Europe, whose works were first introduced to European readers thanks to La Licorne. Susana Soca was simultaneously the publisher, producer, editor and backer for Silvina Ocampo, Felisberto Hernández and many others. However, towards the end of 1948 she left Paris and returned to Montevideo. Paris production of La Licorne ended.

That was not the end of La Licorne, however. It was relaunched in Montevideo as "Entregas de la Licorne" in 1953, controlled as before, by Susana Soca, until her unexpected death in 1959. Now she was able to act as an intermediary between modern Latin American and European literary culture from the western side of the ocean. In Montevideo she attracted figures from the arts whose families had fled from Germany during the Hitler years such as the photographer Gisèle Freund, whom she knew from her time in Paris, and the journalist Hellmut Freund who provided various contributions to Entregas de la Licorne, including an essay about the pioneering artist-photographer Jeanne Mandello who had arrived in Uruguay in 1941. She continued to undertake frequent trips to Europe. Back home in Montevideo she convened literary meetings at her home. She also organised and funded exhibitions that introduced European artists in Latin America, and acted as a sponsor for Uruguayan literary talents such as Felisberto Hernández.

=== Death ===
At the beginning of 1959 Susana Soca was in Paris when she received a call from her mother asking her to come home. At Paris she joined a Lufthansa flight to Rio de Janeiro. On 11 January, as Flight 502 approached Rio's Galeão airport in poor weather, the Lockheed L-1049 hit the water of Guanabara Bay before reaching the nearby airport runway. The pilot lost control and the plane burst into flames near Flecheiras Beach. The 29 passengers all died.

== In retrospect ==
The full extent and importance of Soca's "behind the scenes" activities in literature and the arts during the 1940s and 1950s becomes apparent from literary anthologies, diaries and correspondence, much of which became available to scholars only after her death, for instance in the writings of Albert Camus and Emil Cioran, from pictures and photographs, and from the collected correspondence of others, such as Victoria Ocampo, Roger Caillois, Felisberto Hernández, Juan Ramón Jiménez, José Bergamín-María Zambrano. Pablo Picasso produced an oil-painting of Soca in the 1940s which he then sent to her: it is not clear where the portrait itself has ended up, but a photograph taken in Paris in 1943 by André Ostier shows her standing beside it. Jorge Luis Borges includes a sonnet, "Susana Soca", in "El hacedor", 1960. Gisèle Freund produced numerous photographs of Susana Soca for Soca's long-term admirer Henri Michaux. Soca's poetry was largely confined to her diaries, however, and during her lifetime remained private. One of her first pieces of published work is the extended essay she wrote about Rainer Maria Rilke which appeared in the periodical "Alfar" in 1932. The first published compilation of her poetry appeared only in 1959.

== In truth and fiction ==
In 2018 the Uruguayan novelist Claudia Amengual wrote El lugar inalcanzable, with a fictionalized Susana Soca facing a difficult life in Nazi-occupied Paris. Amengual had previously spent three years researching Susana Soca in Montevideo, Buenos Aires and Paris for a biography which appeared in 2012, and incorporated an analysis of Soca's poetic works and essays.
