= Craig Pittman (writer) =

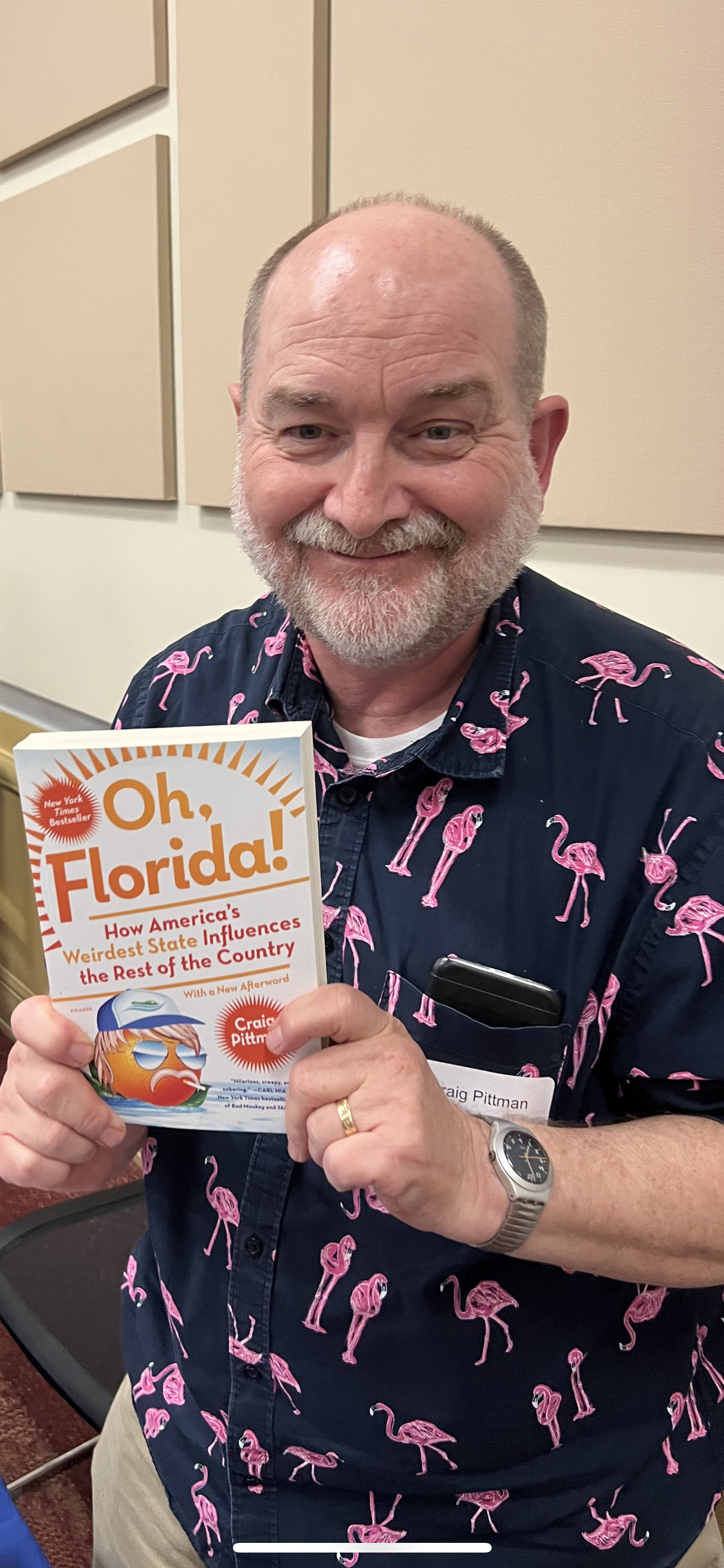
Pittman at a 2023 "Off the Shelf" event held at Gulf Gate Library in Sarasota, Florida

Craig Pittman is an American columnist and author of books who has written mostly about Florida. He was a reporter and columnist for the Tampa Bay Times for thirty-one years before becoming a weekly columnist for the Florida Phoenix, a newsroom in the States Newsroom network. He is co-host of the podcast entitled Welcome to Florida and issues a weekly newsletter entitled Oh Florida!, the Newsletter. An award winning series of articles he co-authored was published as, Paving Paradise. In 2020, the Florida Heritage Book Festival honored Pittman as a "Living Legend".

== Early life and education ==
A native Floridian, Pittman graduated from Troy University in Alabama in 1981.

== Books ==
=== The Scent of Scandal ===
A nonfiction book about a Florida court case involving charges of orchid smuggling. The only book ever classified as "True Crime/Gardening".

=== Oh, Florida! ===
Pittman's 2016 book entitled Oh, Florida! How America's Weirdest State Influences the Rest of the Country is a "compulsively readable" according to The New York Times. Offering a native son's view of Florida, he "obviously loves" the state and makes a persuasive case that Florida has an outsize influence on the national culture. The book grew out of a series of articles Pittman wrote for the magazine, Slate. The book, which covers such topics as driving in Florida, gambling in Florida, and sin and salvation in Florida, contains one of the earliest published uses of the phrase "Drainpipe of America". It became a New York Times bestseller. In February 2017, it won the Florida Book Award gold medal for Florida nonfiction.

=== Cat Tale ===
In Cat Tale, Pittman documents the decades-long rediscovery of the Florida panther, its election to state animal, and conservationist attempts to protect it from inbreeding, pollution, hunting, loss of food, and habitat loss. It describes a controversy when the leading panther expert, Dr. David Maehr, covertly took money from wealthy donors and then wrote faulty science papers that would give developers the green light to "pave" over natural swamps and forests needed for panther habitat.

== Bibliography ==
- Paving Paradise: Florida's Vanishing Wetlands and the Failure of No Net Loss (2009) (co-authored with Matthew Waite)
- Manatee Insanity: Inside the War Over Florida's Most Famous Endangered Species (2010)
- The Scent of Scandal: Greed, Betrayal, and the World's Most Beautiful Orchid (2012)
- Oh, Florida! How America's Weirdest State Influences the Rest of the Country (2016)
- Cat Tale: The Wild, Weird Battle to Save the Florida Panther (2020)
- The State You're In: Florida Men, Florida Women, and Other Wildlife (2021)
