= Democracy Abroad, Lynching At Home =

American history book

Democracy Abroad, Lynching At Home: Racial Violence In Florida
- Author: Tameka Bradley Hobbs
- Language: English
- Subject: History of Florida
- Published: 2015 (University Press of Florida)
- Publication place: USA
- Media type: Print (hardback)
- Pages: 273
- Awards: 2015 Bronze Florida Book Award, 2016 Harry T. and Harriette V. Moore Award from the Florida Historical Society
- ISBN: 9780813062396
- OCLC: 892431968
- Text: Democracy Abroad, Lynching At Home: Racial Violence In Florida at Wikisource

Democracy Abroad, Lynching At Home: Racial Violence In Florida is a 2015 history book by Tameka Bradley Hobbs that discusses how lynchings have changed in the United States, with a focus on the mid 20th century Florida lynchings of Arthur C. Williams, Cellos Harrison, Willie James Howard, and Jesse James Payne. The book won a 2015 Bronze Florida Book Award and the 2016 Harry T. and Harriette V. Moore Award from the Florida Historical Society.

== Synopsis ==
Hobbs reviews how lynchings have been conducted in United States with a focus on four African American men and boys lynched in Florida between 1941 and 1945: Arthur C. Williams, Cellos Harrison, Willie James Howard, and Jesse James Payne. Hobbs argues World War II shifted public opinion and behavior in the United States, leading to private mob violence against African Americans instead of public lynchings, and to what Hobbs describes as "legal lynchings."

== Reception ==
In a review for The Journal of American History, W. Fitzhugh Brundage writes "Tameka Bradley Hobbs makes a convincing argument that these lynchings reveal important insights into the evolution of white supremacy in twentieth-century America." In a review for the Journal of Southern History, Mari N. Crabtree writes that Hobbs "provides valuable insights into the devastating impact of lynching on African American families and communities over the past seventy-five years. With so much of the literature on lynching focused on white southerners, her interviews with African American survivors provide a poignant and, at times, gut-wrenching glimpse into the intergenerational trauma of lynching."

Historian Michael Hoffmann writes in a review for The Florida Times-Union, "An important insight of 'Democracy Abroad, Lynching at Home' is the long-term psychological damage suffered by blacks who experienced white violence during the Jim Crow era." In a review for The Florida Historical Quarterly, Billy Townsend writes,

America uses so many euphemisms - lynching, Jim Crow, racism - for forcing a man to watch his son murdered as a traditional method of governing. They are inadequate to the task of documenting the compounding generational desolation of living at the sharp end of that system. To strip away the euphemism, reveal what's beneath, and link what has happened to what is happening should be the purpose of history. It's where Hobbs' book succeeds brilliantly and heartbreakingly.

In a review for The American Historical Review, Michael J. Pfeifer writes, "Some scholars of lynching (and this includes my own work) have not focused sufficiently on the responses of African Americans to white mob violence, and Hobbs offers an extremely useful example of how fully incorporating the black response presents a more comprehensive and accurate analysis of the context for these events." Brandon T. Jett writes in a review for H-Net Reviews in the Humanities & Social Sciences that "Hobbs's most important contribution [...] rests in her examination of the short- and long-term effects of lynchings on black communities, and how World War II fundamentally shaped many Americans' and the federal government's response to lynchings."

== Awards ==
- 2015 Florida Book Award Bronze Medal
- 2016 Harry T. and Harriette V. Moore Award from the Florida Historical Society

== Contents ==
- Lynched twice: Arthur C. Williams, Gadsden County, 1941
- A Degree of Restraint: The Trials of Cellos Harrison, 1940–1943
- The Failure of Forbearance: The Lynching of Cellos Harrison, Jackson County, 1943
- "A Very Cheap Article": The Lynching of Willie James Howard, Suwannee County, 1944
- Still At It: The Lynching of Jesse James Payne, Madison County, 1945
- Conclusion
- Epilogue. Strange Fruit, Bitter Seeds: The Echoes of Lynching Violence.
