= La Licorne =

La Licorne (French: "The Unicorn") or Cahiers de La Licorne/Cuadernos de la Licorne was a literary magazine founded by Uruguayan poet Susana Soca, which produced three issues in Paris in Spring 1947, Autumn 1948, and Winter 1948.

A follow-on publication, Entregas de la licorne, was launched in Montevideo in 1953 under editor Ángel Rama.
