= Suicide Notes from Beautiful Girls =

2015 novel by Lynn Weingarten

- First edition (US)
- Author: Lynn Weingarten
- Language: English
- Genre: Young adult fiction
- Published: July 2015
- Publisher: Simon Pulse (US); Electric Monkey (UK)
- Publication place: United States
- ISBN: 978-1-4052-7157-8

Suicide Notes from Beautiful Girls is a thriller YA novel written by American author Lynn Weingarten.

== Plot ==
June and Delia used to be best friends; the type of friendship that you think is going to last forever. Built upon shared love, experiences, and secrets, one night everything goes too far. Now they haven't spoken for a year. Then an announcement at school that Delia is dead leaves June reeling and unable to believe her friend's actions. Pushed by Delia's ex-boyfriend Jeremiah, June begins to wonder if it really was suicide at all – or was Delia murdered.
