= Battlesaurus: Rampage at Waterloo =

2015 young adult novel by Brian Falkner

- Author: Brian Falkner
- Language: English
- Genres: Alternate history; fantasy
- Publisher: Square Fish
- Publication date: July 14, 2015
- Publication place: New Zealand
- ISBN: 978-1250079930

Battlesaurus: Rampage at Waterloo is a 2015 young adult alternate history novel written by Brian Falkner. It is set during the Napoleonic Wars in a universe where non-avian dinosaurs never went extinct.

== Premise ==
In an alternate universe, non-avian dinosaurs never went extinct. While smaller dinosaurs thrive in Europe, much larger ones live in the Americas, leading to the continent never become inhabited by humans. After escaping exile in Elba, Napoleon captures some large dinosaurs from the Americas and plans to use them to conquer Europe. It is up to Willem, a 15-year-old Flemish boy, to stop him, as he has the ability to put dinosaurs into a trance because of training from his father, who was a magician.

== Reception and awards ==
The book was received positively, winning the Young Adult Fiction Award in the 2016 New Zealand Book Awards for Children and Young Adults, as well as being on the shortlist for the Ethel Turner Prize for Young Adult's Literature that same year in the New South Wales Premier's Literary Awards. School Library Journal described it as "thrilling and positively addicting".

== See also ==
- Temeraire, another alternate history book series about giant reptiles in the Napoleonic Wars
