= Brian Falkner =

New Zealand author

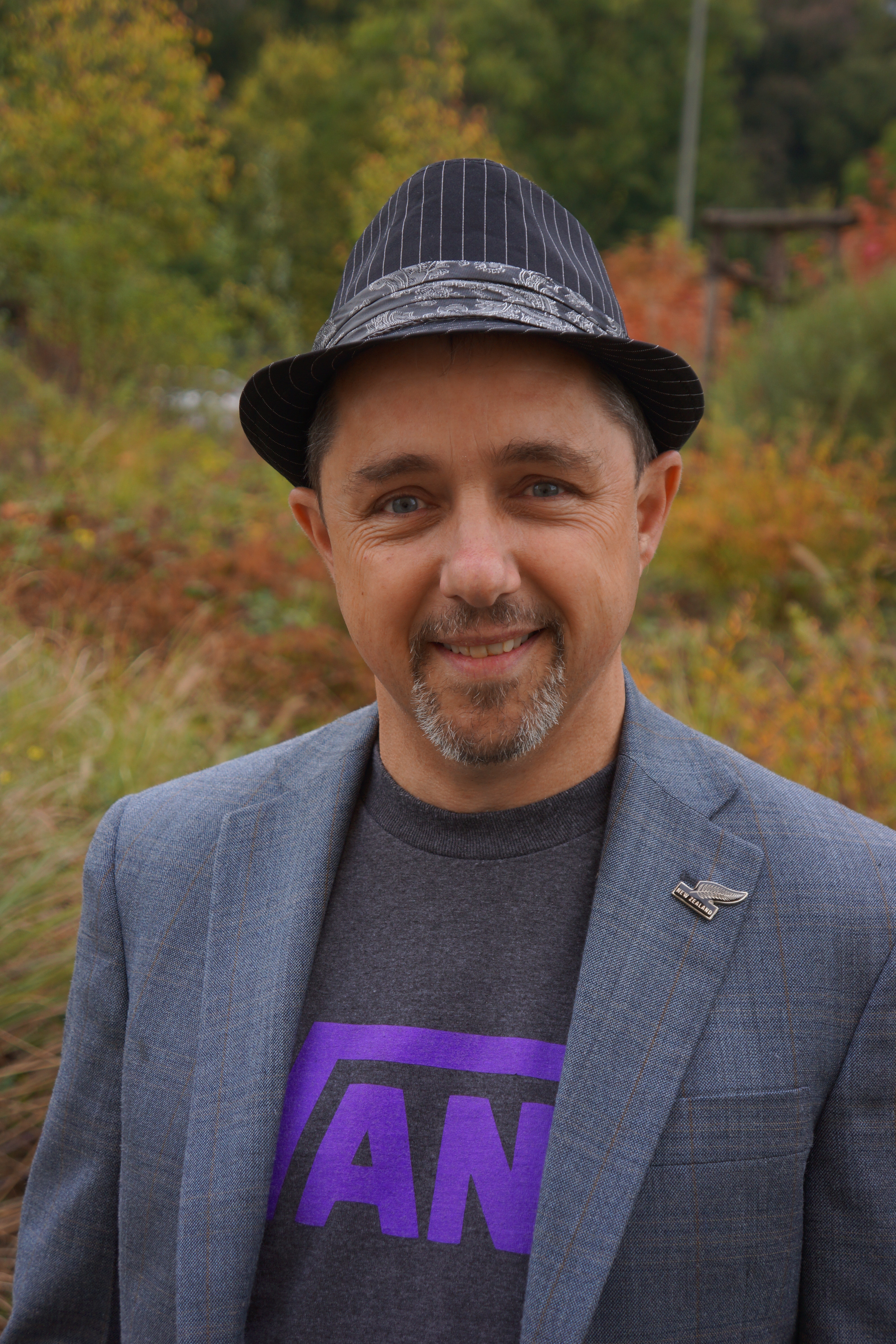
- Falkner in 2012
- Born: 20 July 1962 (age 64); Auckland, New Zealand
- Occupation: Author
- Spouse: Ann Falkner
- Children: 2
- Writing career
- Period: 2003–present

Brian Falkner (born 20 July 1962) is a novelist who was born in Auckland, New Zealand. He went to Ashburton College in May, 2025 and taught teenagers, He has one brother and two sisters. He attended The University of Auckland and studied Computer Science. He attained a diploma of journalism from the Auckland University of Technology (then ATI) then worked for Radio New Zealand. He moved to the South Island of New Zealand where he resided until the age of 26 when he returned to Auckland. His first novel for children was published in 2003. He has received a number of prestigious awards including the Sir Julius Vogel Award for Science Fiction.

== Writing career ==
His first published novel was a junior fiction story about rugby league called Henry and the Flea. He has also written a number of Young Adult books including The Tomorrow Code, Brain Jack, The Project and The Assault.The Tomorrow Code concerns two teens who find a way to receive coded messages from the future. According to WorldCat, the book is held in 876 libraries Brain Jack revolves around a young computer hacker who is recruited into a secret organisation that fights cyber-terrorism. The Most Boring Book in the World (originally titled The Project) is an action-mystery novel about two teenagers who find a very rare (and very boring) book. The Assault is a sci-fi thriller about an alien invasion. Falkner's books for younger readers include Henry and the Flea, The Real Thing, The Super Freak, Maddy West and the Tongue Taker, and Northwood.

=== Books ===
1. Henry and the Flea (2003) AKA The Flea Thing
2. The Real Thing (2004)
3. Super Freak (2005) AKA The Super Freak
4. The Tomorrow Code (2008)
5. Brain Jack (2009)
6. The Project (2010) AKA The Most Boring Book in the World
7. Assault- Recon Team Angel No. 1 (2011)
8. Northwood (2011)
9. Task Force- Recon Team Angel No. 2 (2012)
10. Maddy West and the Tongue Taker (2012)
11. Ice War- Recon Team Angel No. 3 (2013)
12. Vengeance- Recon Team Angel No. 4 (2014)
13. Battlesaurus: Rampage at Waterloo (2015)
14. Battlesaurus: Clash of Empires (2016)
15. Shooting Stars (2016)
16. 1917: Machines of War (2017)
17. That Stubborn Seed of Hope (Short Stories) (2017)
18. Cassie Clark: Outlaw (2018)
19. Katipo Joe: Blitzkrieg (2020)
20. Katipo Joe: Spycraft (2021)
21. Katipo Joe: Wolf's Lair (2022)
22. Andromeda Bond in Trouble Deep (2023)
23. Blitzkrieg (2023)
24. Spider Games - In the City of Spies (2026)

=== Awards ===
- Esther Glen Award 2004 shortlist for Henry and the Flea.
- Storylines Notable Books List 2004 Junior Fiction list for Henry and the Flea.
- Storylines Notable Books List 2005 Junior Fiction list for The Real Thing.
- New Zealand Post Children's Book Awards 2006 Junior Fiction shortlist for Super Freak.
- Storylines Notable Books List 2006 for Super Freak.
- University of Iowa International Writing Programme 2008.
- Esther Glen Award 2009 shortlist for The Tomorrow Code.
- New Zealand Post Children's Book Awards 2009 Young Adult Fiction shortlist for The Tomorrow Code.
- Storylines Notable Books List 2009 Young Adult Fiction list for The Tomorrow Code.
- Storylines Notable Books List 2010 Young Adult Fiction list for Brainjack.
- New Zealand Post Children's Book Awards 2010 Young Adult Finalist for Brainjack.
- New Zealand Post Children's Book Awards 2010 Young Adult Children's Choice category winner for Brainjack.
- Storylines Notable Books List 2011 Young Adult Fiction list for The Project.
- New Zealand Children's Book Awards 2016 Young Adult category winner for Battlesaurus: Rampage at Waterloo.
- NSW Premier's Literary Awards 2016 shortlisted for Battlesaurus: Rampage at Waterloo.
- New Zealand Children's Book Awards 2017 shortlisted for Shooting Stars.
- Ngaio Marsh Awards 2019 longlisted for Cassie Clark: Outlaw.
- New Zealand Post Children's Book Awards 2021 Young Adult shortlist.
- Young Readers prize, Ngaio Marsh Awards 2021 for Katipo Joe.
- New Zealand Children's Book Awards 2023 Young Adult category shortlisted for Andromeda Bond in Trouble Deep.
- New Zealand Book Awards for Children and Young Adults 2026 Young Adult category finalist for Spider Games: In the City of Spies.
