= The Debt Collector's Due =

Novel by Adhirath Sethi

- First edition
- Author: Adhirath Sethi
- Language: English
- Genre: Thriller
- Published: 2015
- Publisher: HarperCollins India
- Publication place: India
- Media type: Print, e-book
- ISBN: 978-93-5136-819-9

The Debt Collector's Due is a 2015 thriller and the debut novel of the Indian author Adhirath Sethi. The book was first published in India on March 10, 2015, through HarperCollins India.

== Plot summary ==
Samay, aged 29, is an unemployed college dropout. He decides all too late to try to turn his life around, but finds this is not an easy task for someone with his limited vocational appeal. He lives alone and pines frequently over an unrequited college romance with Amrita, with whom he has long since lost contact.

In desperation to take any form of work that comes his way, Samay discovers he has a knack for being able to collect debts in a non-violent manner. Although he finds the job to be sinfully boring, he ploughs on knowing the alternatives are none.

His story takes a turn for the bizarre when, during a routine collection, Samay accidentally walks into the office of a mob boss, Pande. Pande in turn mistakes Samay for a hit man due to arrive at the same time and Samay is given 75 lakhs for a hit he did not execute and offered another assignment. Fearing for his life, Samay resolves to run away with the money. He reconsiders this move when he sees that the next hit is Amrita, deciding instead to warn her regarding her imminent danger.

From here on, the story tracks the intertwining journeys of Samay and Amrita as they try to stay one step ahead of the mob. In parallel storylines, we also see what becomes of the real hit man – Raka – and are introduced to the agonizing travails of Waghmare, the bumbling constable assigned to protect Amrita.

The Debt Collector’s Due takes the reader from the busy streets of Mumbai, pauses briefly in an idyllic Parsi colony for a quick murder and then rushes forward to scenic, but foggy Panchgani. Samay must finally confront his tormentor, Pande, and take decisions that truly allow him to grow up once and for all.

== Reception ==
Critical reception for The Debt Collector's Due has been positive. It has received praise from the Deccan Chronicle, who wrote that it "is a classic example of how you can be fortune’s favourite and lose it all for want of ambition and focus."
