= My Pet Human =

Children's novel by Yasmine Surovec

- Author: Yasmine Surovec
- Illustrator: Yasmine Surovec
- Language: English
- Genre: Children's book
- Published: 2015 (Roaring Brook Press)
- Publication place: USA
- Media type: Print (hardback)
- Pages: 106
- ISBN: 9781626720732
- OCLC: 896791555

My Pet Human is a 2015 children's book written and illustrated by Yasmine Surovec. It concerns a black and white stray cat that likes his independence but is eventually persuaded through the regular provision of food and comfort that having a little girl and her family to look after him may not be such a bad thing.

== Reception ==
Publishers Weekly, in a review of My Pet Human, wrote "Opinionated and independent, Oliver has plenty of personality, and Surovec’s simplified cartoons successfully evoke the joys of pet ownership (even when the human is the pet).", and Booklist wrote "Cat-loving kids, particularly emerging readers, will get a kick out of the feline narrator, as well as the heartening story of friendship."

My Pet Human has also been reviewed by Kirkus Reviews, School Library Journal, Horn Book Guides, School Library Connection, and The Bulletin of the Center for Children's Books.
