= Nadia Fink =

Argentine author

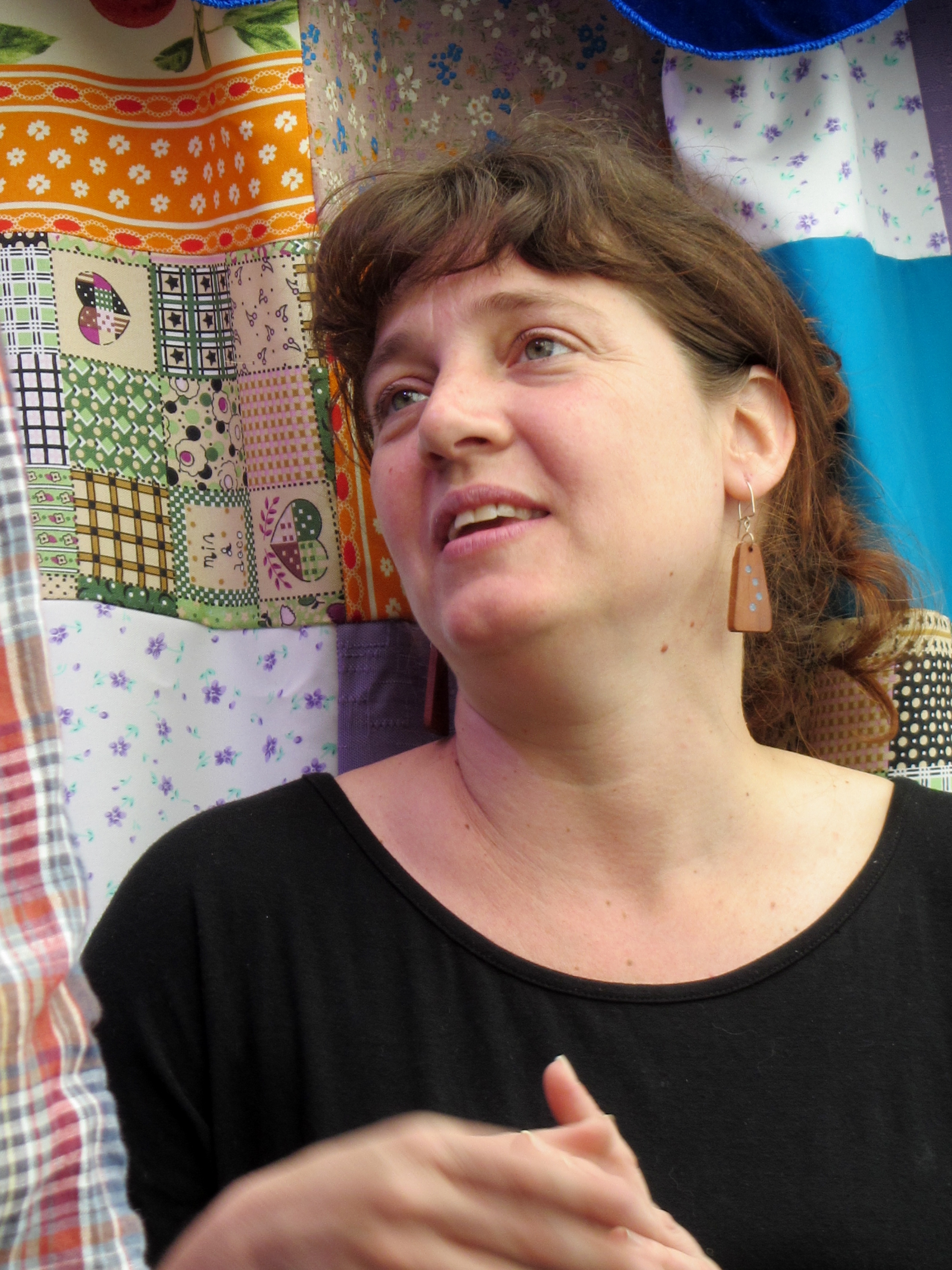
- Fink in 2016
- Born: Cañadita, Santa Fe, Argentina
- Occupations: Author, journalist, editor
- Notable work: Anti-Princess Series and Anti-Hero Series

Nadia Fink is an Argentine author, journalist, and editor known for writing the works in the Anti-Princess Series of picture book biographies of Latin American women. After studying proofreading, she worked as a copyeditor at the magazine Sudestada, and later as a writer. An interest in countering what she perceived as harmful gender roles in children's literature led Fink to cofound the independent publisher Chirimbote and create the Anti-Princess Series in 2015.

The series and its two companions the Anti-Hero Series and League of Anti-Princesses are distributed throughout Latin America and have been translated into several languages. Fink has also written other books for children and coedited volumes for adults about gender and feminism, including an edition inspired by and responding to the Ni una menos movement.

== Early life ==
Nadia Fink was born in Cañadita, Santa Fe, Argentina. She described herself as having "a small-town childhood" and spending a lot of time playing outdoors in her youth. Fink lived in Rosario between 1986 and 1990, where she attended Provincia de Salta School 115. Thereafter, she moved to Buenos Aires. After graduating from secondary school she studied to become a proofreader, and upon completion of that program she started "looking for a way to work for fun".

== Career ==
Fink worked for several years doing administrative labor and teaching preschool. Around 2007, she began proofreading for the Argentine politics and culture magazine Sudestada. Through the magazine, Fink began to write articles, despite having no formal academic training in journalism.

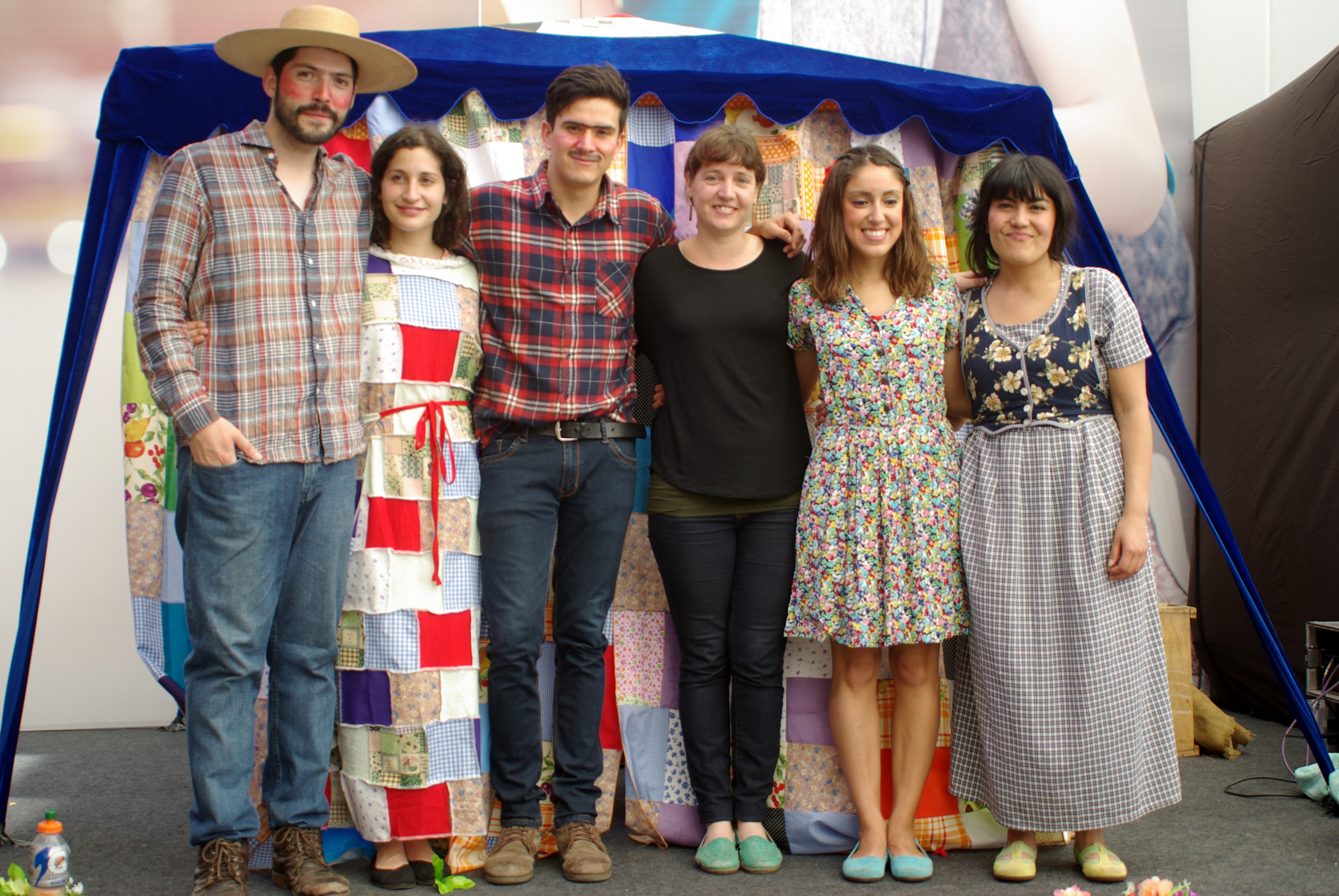
Fink (third from right) attending a staged production of her retelling of the life of Violeta Parra at the 2016 Santiago International Book Fair

While working at Sudestada, Fink researched Frida Kahlo and Violeta Parra and became interested in retelling their stories for children. Alongside illustrator Pitu Saá and designer Martín Azcurra, Fink founded the independent publisher Chirimbote, which, along with Sudestada, published the first three titles in the Anti-Princess Series in 2015. Fink, Saá, and Azcurra sought out female figures in Latin American history whose stories they could tell to counter narratives they found harmful in older fairy tale and more recent princess narratives, such as those of Disney Princesses. By mid-2016, Chirimbote had become the sole publisher of the series.

The success of the series, which is exported throughout much of Latin America, led to the creation of the Anti-Hero Series, which features similar stories about male historical figures from Latin America that "challenge superheroes, in the sense of our considering them to be strong, brave to the extreme, self-sufficient". Fink has authored all the books in the series, some of which have been translated into other languages including Portuguese, Italian, and English. Fink has also written a third series, the League of Anti-Princesses, in which historical figures from the other series join forces.

As part of a collaboration between Chirimbote and Las Juanas Editoras in 2016, Fink edited the volume #Ni una menos desde los primeros años (#Not One Woman More from the Early Years), an academic work about gender equality responding to the Ni una menos movement, in which she also authored a chapter about generation of gender stereotypes through film and literature. In 2018, Fink and Laura Rosso compiled a number of stories about young people's experiences with gender, gender identity, gender roles, and gender stereotypes into a 224-page illustrated book called Feminism for Youths: Now They See Us, published by Chirimbote. The company, whose focus tends to be works on feminism, women's rights, and LGBTQ rights, has also published several books dealing with transgender identities for young people.

Fink stated in 2016 that she felt she could never devote her life solely to children's literature. While working with Chirimbote on the picture book series, she continued to write and edit for the online Argentine news site Marcha.

== Personal life ==
Fink has a daughter. The two have collaborated on work supporting Chirimbote's operations.

== Works ==
=== Children's books ===
==== Anti-Princess, Anti-Hero, and League of Anti-Princesses books ====
Fink's Anti-Princess biographies have covered a range of figures, beginning with Frida Kahlo, Violeta Parra, and Juana Azurduy de Padilla. Other subjects have included the Mothers of the Plaza de Mayo and the transgender performer Susy Shock. The Anti-Hero Series has covered subjects beginning with Julio Cortázar, and continuing with Eduardo Galeano and Che Guevara.

==== Others ====
- Fink, Nadia; Rosso, Laura (2018). Feminismo para jóvenas: Ahora que sí nos ven. Buenos Aires: Chirimbote. ISBN 978-987-42-8581-2.

=== Adult books ===
- Merchán, Cecilia; Fink, Nadia, eds. (2016). #Ni una menos desde los primeros años: Educación en géneros para infancias más libres. Buenos Aires: Chirimbote; Las Juanas. ISBN 978-987-42-1528-4.
- Merchán, Cecilia; Fink, Nadia, eds. (2018). #Infancias libres: Talleres y actividades para educación en géneros. Buenos Aires: Chirimbote; Las Juanas. ISBN 978-987-42-7604-9.
