= Cartagena (novel) =

2015 novel by Claudia Amengual

- First edition
- Author: Claudia Amengual
- Language: Spanish
- Published: 2015
- Publisher: Alfaguara
- ISBN: 978-9974-723-61-0

Cartagena is a 2015 Spanish-language novel by Uruguayan writer Claudia Amengual.

Set in Montevideo and Cartagena de Indias, it tells the story of a journalist living his midlife crisis who takes wrong decisions with disastrous consequences. Thirty years later, he travels to Cartagena in search of a new opportunity. Notably, Colombian writer Gabriel García Márquez appears as an important character in the last pages. This novel constitutes a posthumous tribute to the Colombian Nobel Prize winner.

== Awards ==
- Premio Herralde 2014: Finalist (Editorial Anagrama).
