= Claudia Amengual =

Uruguayan writer and translator

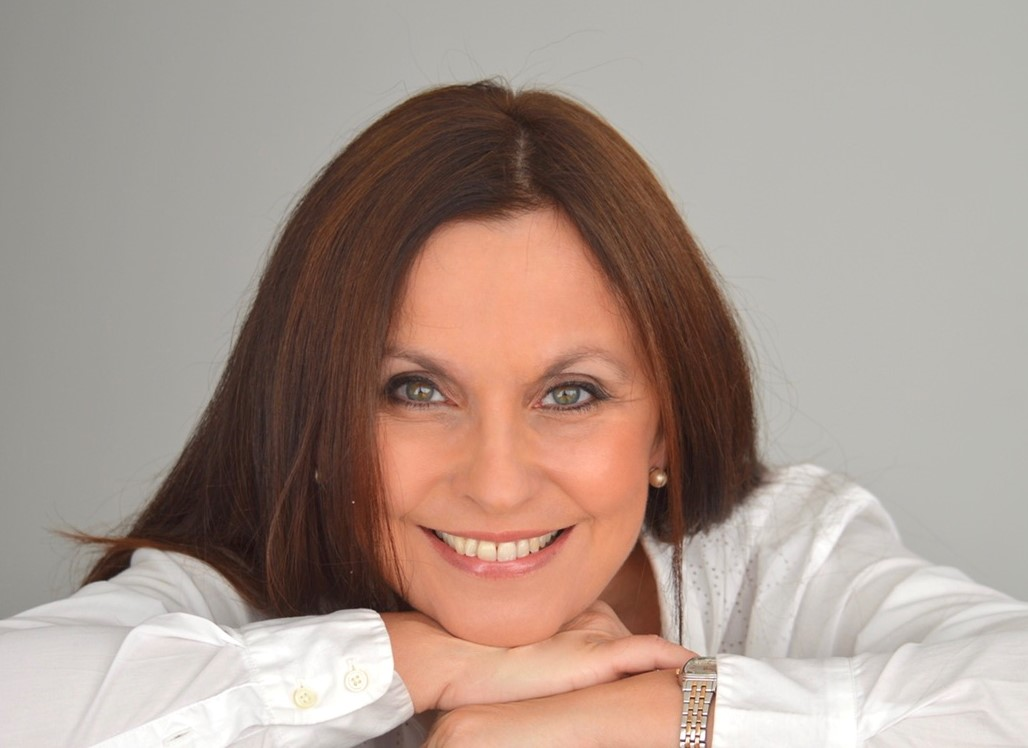
- Claudia Amengual
- Born: Claudia Amengual Puceiro; 7 January 1969 (age 57); Montevideo, Uruguay
- Occupations: writer, translator
- Writing career
- Language: Spanish

Claudia Amengual Puceiro (born 7 January 1969, in Montevideo) is a Uruguayan writer and translator. She is a recipient of the Sor Juana Inés de la Cruz Prize.

== Biography ==
She obtained her degrees in translation and literature at the University of the Republic. In 2003 she obtained a fellowship to study at the Complutense University of Madrid and Menéndez Pelayo International University in Santander, Spain. Member of Bogotá39.

== Work ==
- Juliana y los libros, 2020 (novel)
- El lugar inalcanzable, 2018 (novel)
- Viajar y escribir: nueve destinos que inspiran, 2017 (essay)
- Una mirada al periodismo cultural: Jaime Clara y "Sábado Sarandí", 2016 (essay)
- Cartagena, 2015 (novel)
- Rara avis. Vida y obra de Susana Soca, 2012 (essay)
- Falsas ventanas, 2011 (novel)
- Más que una sombra, 2007 (novel)
- Desde las cenizas, 2005 (novel)
- El vendedor de escobas, 2002 (novel)
- La rosa de Jericó, 2000 (novel)

== Prizes ==
- Premio Sor Juana Inés de la Cruz (2006) for Desde las cenizas.
- Mention in Dramaturgy, Premios Onetti (2018) for Camaleón, camaleón.
