= Tameka Bradley Hobbs =

American historian, educator, and author

Tameka Bradley Hobbs Dr.
- Occupations: Library Regional Manager, African American Research Library and Cultural Center, Broward County Library.

Academic background
- Education: Florida State University; Florida A&M University

Academic work
- Discipline: Historian
- Notable works: Democracy Abroad, Lynching At Home: Racial Violence In Florida

Tameka Bradley Hobbs is a historian, educator, author, and activist. She currently serves as the Library Regional Manager of Broward County Library's African American Research Library and Cultural Center in Fort Lauderdale, Florida. She previously served as associate provost of Florida Memorial University and the founding director of the FMU Social Justice Institute think tank and research center. She is the author of the 2015 history book Democracy Abroad, Lynching at Home: Racial Violence in Florida.

== Early life and education ==
Hobbs was raised in Live Oak, Florida. While an undergraduate at Florida A&M University, Hobbs was inspired by an African American history course to shift the focus of her studies from business to history, and graduated with a B.A. in history. She became interested in becoming an oral historian after speaking with her grandfather about his experience living in Live Oak, and his recollections of the lynching of Willie James Howard in Live Oak, and then focused her research while a graduate student at Florida State University on the history of racial violence in Florida.

Hobbs completed her master's degree and PhD at Florida State University. Her 2000 master's thesis was titled "Lynched Twice: The Murder of A.C. Williams", and the title of her 2004 dissertation is "Hitler is Here: Lynching in Florida during the Era of World War II."

== Career ==
Hobbs' experience as an educator includes teaching at Florida A&M University, Virginia State University, and John Tyler Community College. She has worked as a historian and coordinator for The Valentine Richmond History Center Richmond History Gallery Project and was the Program and Education Manager for the Library of Virginia from 2007 through 2011. Hobbs began teaching at Florida Memorial University (FMU) in 2011. While at FMU, she worked with FMU alumna Sybrina Fulton, the mother of Trayvon Martin, to create the Trayvon Martin Foundation in the campus library in 2014.

Hobbs has written on a variety of subjects, including culture and history. In 2015, Hobbs published Democracy Abroad, Lynching At Home: Racial Violence In Florida, which won a Bronze Florida Book Award and includes oral histories of family members and descendants of lynching victims. In 2021, Hobbs described oral history as a way to "wrest control of a community's narrative from white-controlled institutions."

In 2020, as associate provost at Florida Memorial University, Hobbs became the founding director of the FMU Social Justice Institute, a think tank and research center focused on systemic racism in Florida. When the US Congress considered making lynching a federal crime in 2020, Hobbs spoke with The New York Times about people who lack of awareness of the historical magnitude of violence motivated by racism in the United States, and stated, "I think if they understood that, perhaps they would understand the Black Lives Matter movement as an extension of centuries, really, of advocacy on the part of African-Americans."

In 2022, Hobbs served as the inaugural executive director of the A. Philip Randolph Institute for Law, Race, Social Justice, and Economic Policy at Edward Waters University.

In November 2022, she became the Regional Manager of the African American Research Library and Cultural Center.

== Works ==
- Hobbs, Tameka Bradley; Guzmán, William (2000). Landmarks and Legacies: A Guide to Tallahassee's African American Heritage, 1865-1968. John G. Riley Center/Museum. ISBN 9780996785235.
- Fortune, T. Thomas; Weinfeld, Daniel R.; Herd-Clark, Dawn J.; Hobbs, Tameka Bradley (2014). After War Times: An African American Childhood in Reconstruction-Era Florida. Tuscaloosa: The University of Alabama Press. ISBN 9780817387679.
- Hobbs, Tameka Bradley (2015). Democracy Abroad, Lynching at Home: Racial Violence in Florida. Gainesville: University Press of Florida. ISBN 9780813055466.
- Hobbs, Tameka Bradley (2013). Junebug and the Gumbo Garden. CreateSpace Independent Publishing Platform. ISBN 1-4912-2484-3
- Hobbs, Tameka Bradley and Austin, Jason (2016). Soar. CreateSpace Independent Publishing Platform. ISBN 1-5229-7416-4

== Honors and awards ==
- 2015 Florida Book Award Bronze Medal for Democracy Abroad, Lynching At Home
- 2016 Harry T. and Harriette V. Moore Award from the Florida Historical Society for Democracy Abroad, Lynching At Home
