= John Marenbon =

British philosopher (born 1955)

John Alexander Marenbon FBA (born 26 August 1955) is a British philosopher and Fellow of Trinity College, Cambridge. His principal area of specialization is medieval philosophy.

== Career ==
Marenbon was educated at Westminster School and Trinity College, Cambridge, obtaining BA, MA, PhD, and DLitt degrees from the University of Cambridge. Since 1978 he has been a Fellow of Trinity College and a senior research fellow there since 2005. In 2010, he became an honorary professor of medieval philosophy at Cambridge, delivering an inaugural lecture entitled 'When was medieval philosophy?'. He has also taught at Paris-Sorbonne University, been a visiting fellow at both the Centre for Medieval Studies and the Pontifical Institute of Mediaeval Studies at the University of Toronto, and held a visiting appointment at Peking University.

He was elected a Fellow of the British Academy in 2009.

Since 2020 Marenbon has been a visiting professor at the University of Italian Switzerland.

== Selected bibliography ==
Authored books

- Medieval Philosophy : an historical and philosophical Introduction, London and New York; Routledge, 2007
- The Cambridge Companion to Boethius (ed.), Cambridge; Cambridge University Press, 2009
- The Oxford Handbook of Medieval Philosophy (editor), New York; Oxford University Press 2012
- The Hellenistic Schools and Thinking about Pagan Philosophy in the Middle Ages. A study of second-order influence [booklet], Basel; Schwabe, 2012
- Continuity and Innovation in Medieval and Modern Philosophy. Knowledge, mind, and language (editor), Oxford: Oxford University Press for the British Academy, 2013 = Proceedings of the British Academy 189
- Abelard in Four Dimensions. A twelfth-century philosopher in his context and ours, Notre Dame: University of Notre Dame Press, 2013
- Pagans and Philosophers. The problem of paganism from Augustine to Leibniz, Princeton and Woodbridge; Princeton University Press 2015
