= Kevan Atteberry =

American writer

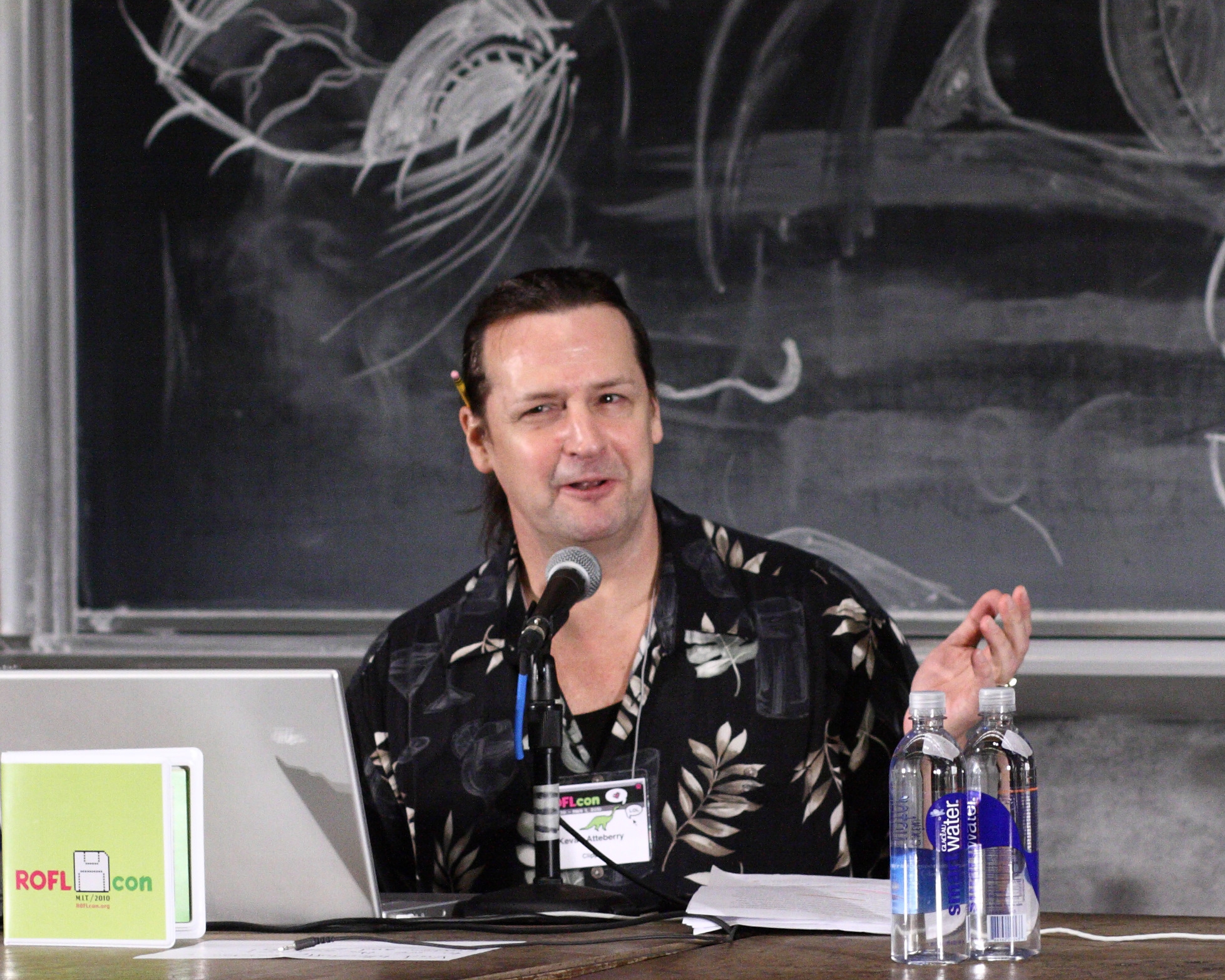
- Kevan Atteberry at the 2010 ROFLCon
- Occupation: Children's books writer; illustrator
- Notable works: Clippy; Bunnies!!!

Website
- www.kevanatteberry.com

Kevan Atteberry (born 1955 or 1956) is a Seattle-based writer and illustrator known for children's books like Bunnies!!! and for creating Clippy, the animated paperclip helper included in Microsoft Office in the early 2000s.

== Clippy ==
Atteberry worked for Microsoft creating character designs for Microsoft Bob, a house-like interface for new computer users. Bob was poorly received, and was quickly discontinued, but Microsoft moved Atteberry's contract over to work on another character-based new user tool called Office Assistant, build into Microsoft Office. He submitted more than 15 designs (drafted on a Macintosh computer), including a rabbit, stapler, and an anthropomorphic paperclip. The company tested hundreds of designs, with the paperclip emerging as the most popular. It was given the name Clippit, but became popularly known as Clippy. On release, negative reaction to Clippy was severe, becoming a touchstone of failed design and named as one of Time's "50 Worst Inventions".

Atteberry eventually stopped working for Microsoft to spend time with his family. Clippy's negative reception led him to omit it from his portfolio for a time, regarding it as a professional embarrassment. In the 2010s and 2020s, however, he reassessed his design as he began receiving fan mail and recognition for designing a pop culture icon, with a wave of nostalgia driving even Clippy-based erotica.

== Children's books ==
Atteberry is a writer and illustrator of children's books. His 2015 picture book, Bunnies!!!, was a 2016 CCBC Choices book and received the 2016 Missouri Building Block award. In 2020, he published Ghost Cat, which was a finalist for the Washington State Book Award and received a regional Crystal Kite Award.
