= Lufthansa Flight 502 =

Aviation accident in 1959

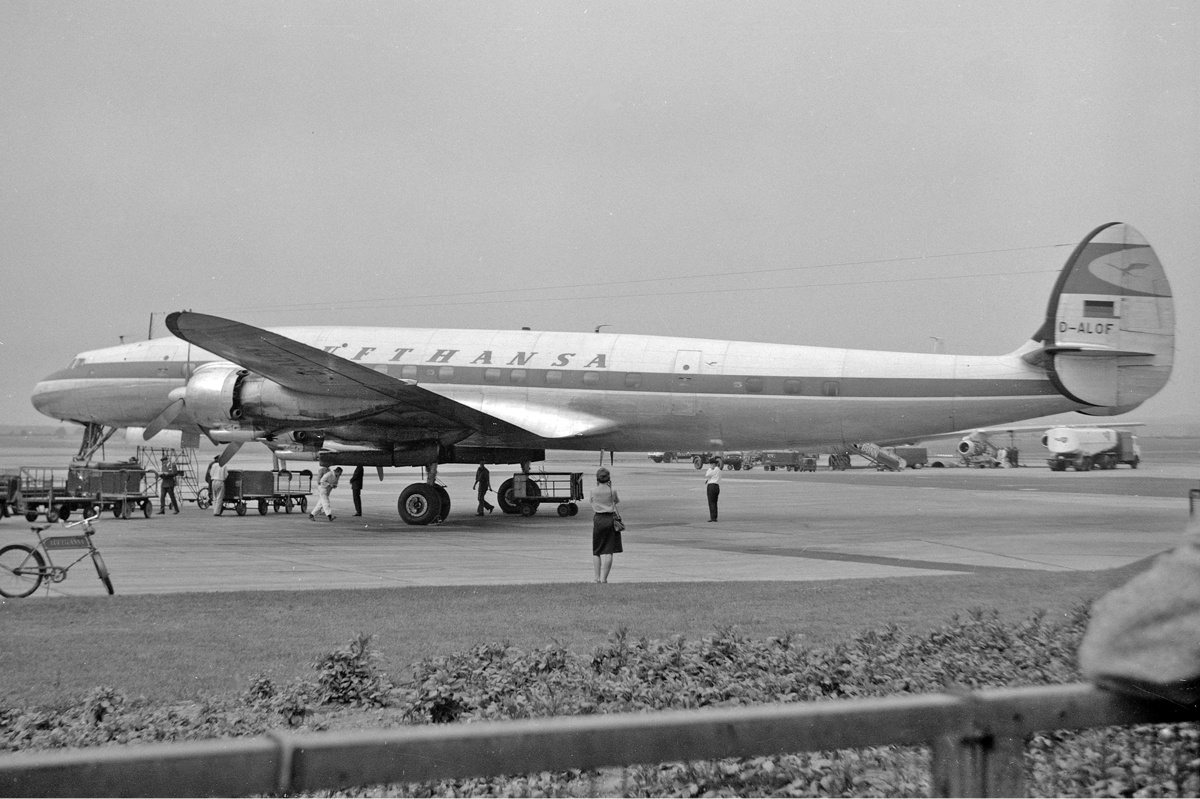
- A Lockheed L-1049 Super Constellation, similar to the accident aircraft

Accident
- Date: 11 January 1959
- Summary: Controlled flight into terrain
- Site: Rio de Janeiro–Galeão International Airport, Brazil

Aircraft
- Aircraft type: Lockheed L-1049G Super Constellation
- Operator: Lufthansa
- Call sign: LUFTHANSA 502
- Registration: D-ALAK
- Flight origin: Dakar Airport, Senegal
- Destination: Rio de Janeiro–Galeão International Airport, Brazil
- Occupants: 39
- Passengers: 29
- Crew: 10
- Fatalities: 36
- Injuries: 3
- Survivors: 3

Lufthansa Flight 502 was a scheduled flight from Hamburg, Germany to Buenos Aires, Argentina on 11 January 1959. The flight was being operated by a Lockheed L-1049G Super Constellation (registration D-ALAK). On the leg between Senegal and Brazil the Super Constellation was on approach to Rio de Janeiro–Galeão International Airport when it crashed near Flecheiras Beach just short of the runway. All 29 passengers and seven of the ten crew were killed. It was the first fatal accident involving the current Lufthansa since it was formed in 1955.

== Accident ==
The aircraft was cleared by air traffic control to descend to 900 metres (3,000 ft) over Guanabara Bay as part of the approach sequence to Runway 14 at Rio de Janeiro/Galeão International Airport. During the descent the weather was rainy. Descending too low on approach, the Constellation struck the water with the aircraft's nosewheel; the crew attempted to continue the approach, but were unable to maintain control, and the aircraft crashed near Flecheiras Beach. All of the aircraft's passengers (including both the literary impressaria Susana Soca and the Archduchess Maria Ileana of Austria-Tuscany, granddaughter of King Ferdinand I of Romania, along with her husband) as well as seven crewmembers died; the co-pilot, a steward and a stewardess survived the impact.

== Aircraft ==
The aircraft, a Lockheed L-1049G Super Constellation airliner powered by four Wright R-3350 radial piston engines, had been built in 1955, and was delivered to Lufthansa on 17 May 1955. The aircraft was sold to Seaboard World Airlines in May 1958, but had been returned to Lufthansa in November of that year.

== Probable cause ==
An accident investigation was unable to determine the cause of the crash, but considered that the most likely cause of the accident was pilot error, resulting in Flight 502 descending below the minimum altitude required for the approach. The crew had exceeded the flight time limits set by Brazilian aeronautical regulations, but not under German rules; aircrew fatigue was determined to be a contributing factor.

== Investigation of the aircraft accident ==
The investigation into the air accident could not determine the exact cause of the accident. Pilot error probably led to the crash, as Flight 502 had descended below the altitude that was cleared for this phase of the landing approach.

Because the crew had exceeded the maximum permitted flight times according to the Brazilian aviation regulations – but not according to the German rules in force at the time – the fatigue of the cockpit crew was found to be a contributing factor.

== See also ==
'Other similar accidents:

- Lufthansa Flight 527
- AIRES Flight 8250
- Asiana Airlines Flight 214
- Air Canada Flight 624
- Crossair Flight 3597
- Delta Air Lines Flight 723
- Lion Air Flight 904
- Smolensk air disaster
- Turkish Airlines Flight 1951
- Vietnam Airlines Flight 815

Other aviation accidents involving members of royalty:

- 1937 Sabena Junkers Ju 52 Ostend crash
- 1947 KLM Douglas DC-3 Copenhagen disaster
- Air France Flight 447
