= Everything That Makes You =

Book by Moriah McStay

- First edition
- Author: Moriah McStay
- Language: English
- Genre: novel
- Published: 2015 (Katherine Tegen Books)
- Publication place: USA
- Media type: Print (paperback)
- Pages: 352
- ISBN: 9780062295484
- OCLC: 966589899

Everything That Makes You is an American young adult novel by Moriah McStay. The novel was published in 2015 by Katherine Tegan Books.

Set in Memphis, the novel is a split narrative that combines the story of teenager Fiona Doyle with one narrative focusing on Fiona, a teenager who was burned as a child by the hot oil from a popcorn machine and sustained severe facial scars, and the other focusing on "Fi", the version of Fiona who was unscarred by the accident.

McStay, who is blind in one eye, decided to write the book based on her own experiences wondering what her life would have been like if she had full sight.

== Plot ==
Fiona Doyle is a teenager who is extremely self-conscious about her severe facial scarring, caused by oil burns from a popcorn machine. She has a crush on Trent, one of her classmates, but realizes that he will never be attracted to her because of her scars. To her surprise her friend David asks her out and Fiona begins dating him though she is not particularly attracted to him. Instead she is focused on song-writing, guitar playing, and trying to get into Northwestern University for creative writing. Before she leaves for university her doctors suggest a skin graft from a cadaver that might help her cosmetically. After her mother and brother pressure her, Fiona decides to go for the surgery.

Fi Doyle is a version of Fiona that never sustained facial injuries. She is close friends with Trent, but rejects his romantic advances. Obsessed with lacrosse, her life is changed when she severely injures her ankle, putting her chance of attending Northwestern University on a sports scholarship in jeopardy. While on rest she meets a home schooled boy called Marcus King and the two begin dating. Fi decides not to apply to Northwestern so she won't have to be apart from Marcus but is shocked when she discovers that, despite claiming to have severe allergies, he actually has a weakened heart and is dying.

Fiona's surgery is a success and she attends Northwestern University for creative writing. While there she meets Jackson King who is also from Memphis and the two begin a flirty friendship despite the fact that Fiona is still dating David long distance. Despite knowing that Fiona has a boyfriend Jackson asks Fiona on a date. During the course of their discussion they eventually come to realize that the skin from the skin graft that Fiona received was from Jackson's deceased twin brother, Marcus. The realization causes the two of them to abort their friendship.

In Fi's timeline she delays going to Northwestern for lacrosse in order to be by Marcus' side. He dies and she finds herself going to a local university that she hates with a terrible lacrosse team made up of amateurs. Upset that her brother is becoming so distant she finds herself becoming closer to Jackson, who shares her grief, and reconnecting with Trent. After Trent urges Fi to visit him at university she realizes that he is still attracted to her and begins to consider dating for the first time since Marcus died. To her surprise Jackson gives her his blessing.

As a condition of her scholarship Fiona attends music classes and is forced to finally perform one of her songs for the class. When the performance goes terribly she throws out her writing notebooks. They are retrieved by Jackson and the two share an intimate moment which is witnessed by Fiona's boyfriend David. David and Fiona break up. During summer break Fiona forces herself to confront her fear of performing in public by performing at the local coffee shop's open mic night. Jackson witnesses the performance, and after Fiona tells him that the lyrics in the song were about him, not David, the two share a kiss.

After her grades tank due to her disinterest at school Fi is kicked off the lacrosse team. She works hard to up her grades before the end of the semester and succeeds. Emboldened by her achievement Fi writes to the recruiter at Northwestern to explain her situation. While the recruiter does not offer Fi a spot on the team, she does extend a spot at the summer training camp to Fi which might lead to a recruitment from the school. Fi decides to take the opportunity. Before she leaves Trent comes to visit her and confesses that he has always loved her. The two share a kiss.

== Reception ==
Everything That Makes You received fair to mildly positive reviews. Kirkus declared that "the premise may intrigue more than the product". Booklist was more favorable stating, "teens who have ever wondered what it might be like to live a totally different life will appreciate this experiment." School Library Journal similarly noted, "The story line flows from chapter to chapter even though there are two different points of view."

It has also been reviewed by Publishers Weekly, The Bulletin of the Center for Children's Books, and Horn Book.
