= Second opinion =

Opinion on a matter disputed by two or more parties

A second opinion is an opinion on a matter disputed by two or more parties.

== Law ==
In legal cases, a second opinion which contradicts the opinion of a jointly retained expert may be disregarded as not being impartial.

=== Consumer rights ===
In cases such as car repairs, a second opinion should be obtained in writing, and the original garage given an opportunity to rectify matters. In the case of clients' disputes with domestic building contractors, the builder may seek a second opinion to confirm their view.

== Medicine ==
A second opinion can be a visit to a physician other than the one a patient has previously been seeing in order to get more information or to hear a differing point of view. Some reasons for which a patient may seek out a second opinion include:

- Physician recommends surgery.
- Physician diagnoses patient with serious illness (such as cancer).
- Physician recommends a treatment for the patient other than what the patient believes is necessary.
- When physician recommends elective surgery, it may be required by the insurance plan. In other cases, insurance will not pay for a second opinion.
- Patient believes they have a condition that the physician diagnosed incorrectly or failed to diagnose.
- The physician themself recommends a second opinion.

Different payment procedures apply to different second opinions. For example, some health plans pay for second opinions for members; many employers offer free second opinion benefits through companies like Grand Rounds or similar companies; and some states have public programs for cancer second opinions.

=== Workplace disputes ===
Second opinions may also be obtained by employers.

== Professional mediation ==
Professional mediators may be asked for second opinions regarding whether to proceed to trial or seek a settlement instead.
