= Bunnies!!! =

2015 picture book by Kevan Atteberry

- Author: Kevan Atteberry
- Illustrator: Kevan Atteberry
- Language: English
- Subject: Children's literature, picture book,
- Published: 2015 (Katherine Tegen Books)
- Publication place: United States
- Media type: Print hardback)
- Pages: 32 (unpaginated)
- ISBN: 978-0-06-230783-5
- OCLC: 905185078

Bunnies!!! is a 2015 children's picture book by Kevan Atteberry about the interaction between Declan, a small friendly monster, and a group of four rabbits.

== Reception ==
A review of Bunnies!!! by the School Library Journal wrote "The expressive cartoon characters rendered digitally in full color make this spare tale understandable for both readers and non-readers. .. Children will sympathize with the simple emotions of the monster and the unease of the rabbits that slowly builds toward trust, but it is the madcap action that will have them laughing with delight and asking for the book again.", and Children's Book & Media Review recommended it for beginning readers and to " teach young readers to accept and love all the different kinds of people around us."

Bunnies!!! has also been reviewed by The Horn Book Guide, Kirkus Reviews, Publishers Weekly, and the Sahuarita Sun.

Bunnies!!! won the 2016 Missouri Building Block award, and was a 2016 CCBC Choices book.
