= Dan Josefson =

American writer

Dan Josefson (March 8, 1974) is an American writer. His accomplishments include a 2015 Whiting Award in fiction.

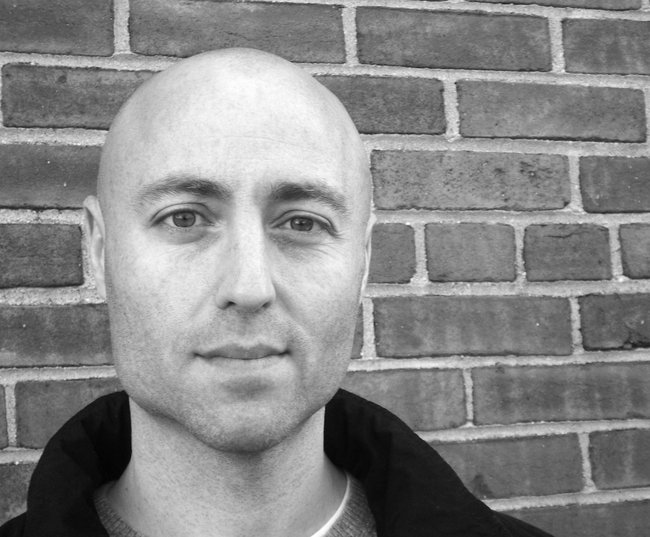
Dan Josefson

== Life ==
Dan Josefson was born on March 8, 1974, in Mount Kisco, New York. A few months later, Dan moved to Chappaqua, New York. He graduated from Williams College, and from University of Nevada, Las Vegas. He currently lives in Manhattan.

In the Fall of 2012, his book, That's Not a Feeling was released by Soho Press. On November 18, 2012, he appeared in the New York Times Book Review.

== Works ==
- That's Not a Feeling. Soho Press. 2 October 2012. ISBN 978-1-61695-189-4.
