= The Misfit Economy =

2015 book by Alexa Clay and Kyra Maya Phillips

The Misfit Economy: Lessons in Creativity From Pirates, Hackers, Gangsters, And Other Informal Entrepreneurs
- First edition
- Authors: Alexa Clay, Kyra Maya Phillips
- Language: English
- Subjects: Business, entrepreneurship, economics
- Genre: non-fiction
- Published: 2015
- Publisher: Simon & Schuster
- Publication place: USA
- Media type: Print (hardcover)
- Pages: 248
- ISBN: 978-14-5168882-5
- Website: http://www.misfiteconomy.com/

The Misfit Economy: Lessons in Creativity From Pirates, Hackers, Gangsters, And Other Informal Entrepreneurs is a 2015 book by Alexa Clay and Kyra Maya Phillips about the innovators and entrepreneurs among the underground economies and grey markets of the world.

== Reception ==
It has been reviewed by The Financial Times, The National, New York Daily News, Dallas News, the Stanford Social Innovation Review, and Business Insider. The authors were interviewed about the book in Forbes.
