= Pagans and Philosophers =

2015 book by John Marenbon

- Book cover
- Author: John Marenbon
- Language: English
- Publisher: Princeton University Press
- Publication date: 22 March 2015
- Publication place: United States
- Pages: 368
- ISBN: 978-0-691-14255-5

Pagans and Philosophers: The Problem of Paganism from Augustine to Leibniz is a 2015 book by the British philosopher John Marenbon. It is about the treatment of pre-Christian thought among Christian writers and theologians from late antiquity to the early 18th century. The author labels his subject as the "problem of paganism" during the "Long Middle Ages".

== Summary ==
Pagans and Philosophers covers what John Marenbon calls the "Long Middle Ages", spanning from the 5th to early 18th centuries. Marenbon calls his method "historical synthesis", which is about tracing the handling of a perceived problem from the past, rather than looking for past solutions to a current problem. The book is about how Christians received and treated pre-Christian material, notably that of Aristotle, Cato the Elder and indigenous peoples of the Americas. The Christian material the book looks at includes theological writings, travelogues and poetry. The main areas of discussion were virtue, leading to the conception of the virtuous pagan, knowledge, leading to discussions about the merits of ancient wisdom, and salvation, including the implication that people who lived before the revelation of Jesus or never were reached by Christian teachings must be condemned to Hell. Marenbon coins the term "the problem of paganism" as a collective name for these discussions.

There are three main sections in Pagans and Philosophers. The first is about the emergence of the problem of paganism in late antiquity, with focus on Augustine of Hippo and Boethius. The second part is about the period from the Carolingian Renaissance to the 15th century, covering a disparate body of literature that includes discussions on pagan knowledge and how it relates to knowledge of God, how Christian charity distinguishes Christian and pagan virtue, and conflicting views of whether pagans could be saved. The third section addresses contacts with non-Christian populations outside of the Old World and how the previously developed views continued through Christian humanism and Protestantism.

== Reception ==
Princeton University Press published Pagans and Philosophers on 22 March 2015. Lionel Wickham reviewed the book in The Journal of Ecclesiastical History, calling it "erudite, informative, stimulating and interesting to read". Alfonso Herreros Besa wrote in Medievalista that the subject gives justification to Marenbon's conception of the Long Middle Ages. He wrote that the breadth of the study makes the book suitable both as a resource for scholars and an introduction to the intellectual history of grace.

== See also ==
- Christianity and paganism
