= Anti-Princess Series and Anti-Hero Series =

Biography series by Nadia Fink

Anti-Princess Series Anti-Hero Series League of Anti-Princesses
- Covers of the first fifteen books in the series
- Author: Nadia Fink
- Original title: Colección antiprincesas Colección antihéroes Liga de antiprincesas
- Illustrator: Pitu Saá
- Cover artist: Pitu Saá
- Country: Argentina
- Language: Spanish
- Genre: Biography picture books
- Publisher: Chirimbote
- Published: 2015–present
- No. of books: 24 (list)

The Anti-Princess Series (Spanish: Colección antiprincesas) and Anti-Hero Series (Spanish: Colección antihéroes) are Argentine children's biography picture books written by Nadia Fink and illustrated by Pitu Saá. First published in 2015, the series cover the lives of South and Central American artists and leaders like Frida Kahlo, Violeta Parra, and Julio Cortázar. Fink sought to create works for children that addressed and subverted gender stereotypes, in opposition to narratives presented in traditional fairytales. The works are published in Spanish by Chirimbote, an independent publisher founded by Fink, Saá, and Martín Azcurra.

Books in the series have received positive reception for their depictions of their historical subjects, their artwork, and their efforts to weaken established gender roles. Some volumes have been translated into other languages, including Portuguese and English, and Fink and Saá have developed a third companion series, the League of Anti-Princesses (Spanish: Liga de antiprincesas), which features historical figures using time travel to help one another. As of 2023, Chirimbote has released 13 Anti-Princess, six Anti-Hero, and five League books.

== Format and content ==
Works in the series are children's picture book biographies of South and Central American artists and leaders. The series specifically seek to recount stories of figures who changed aspects of society but not through force or domination. Books in the series tend to run about 26 pages in length and provide "hyperlink-style" definitions (a feature devised by book designer Martín Azcurra) of challenging terms from the text such as "dictatorship", "surrealism", "tyranny", and "revolution". Each work concludes with a brief collection of activities and games encouraging readers to respond to and create art inspired by the book's subject. An anthropomorphized animal or item from the life of the central figure of each work accompanies them and asks questions to tie different elements of the biographies together. Visually, the books combine illustrations by Pitu Saá with reproductions of photographs and, when applicable, visual works of art by the books' subjects. Not all visual artworks are direct reproductions; some are recreated by Saá in a style congruent with that of his other illustrations in the books. Several crossover works have been published; the League of Anti-Princesses follows characters from previous Anti-Princess books using a time travel potion to explore history together.

== Writing ==
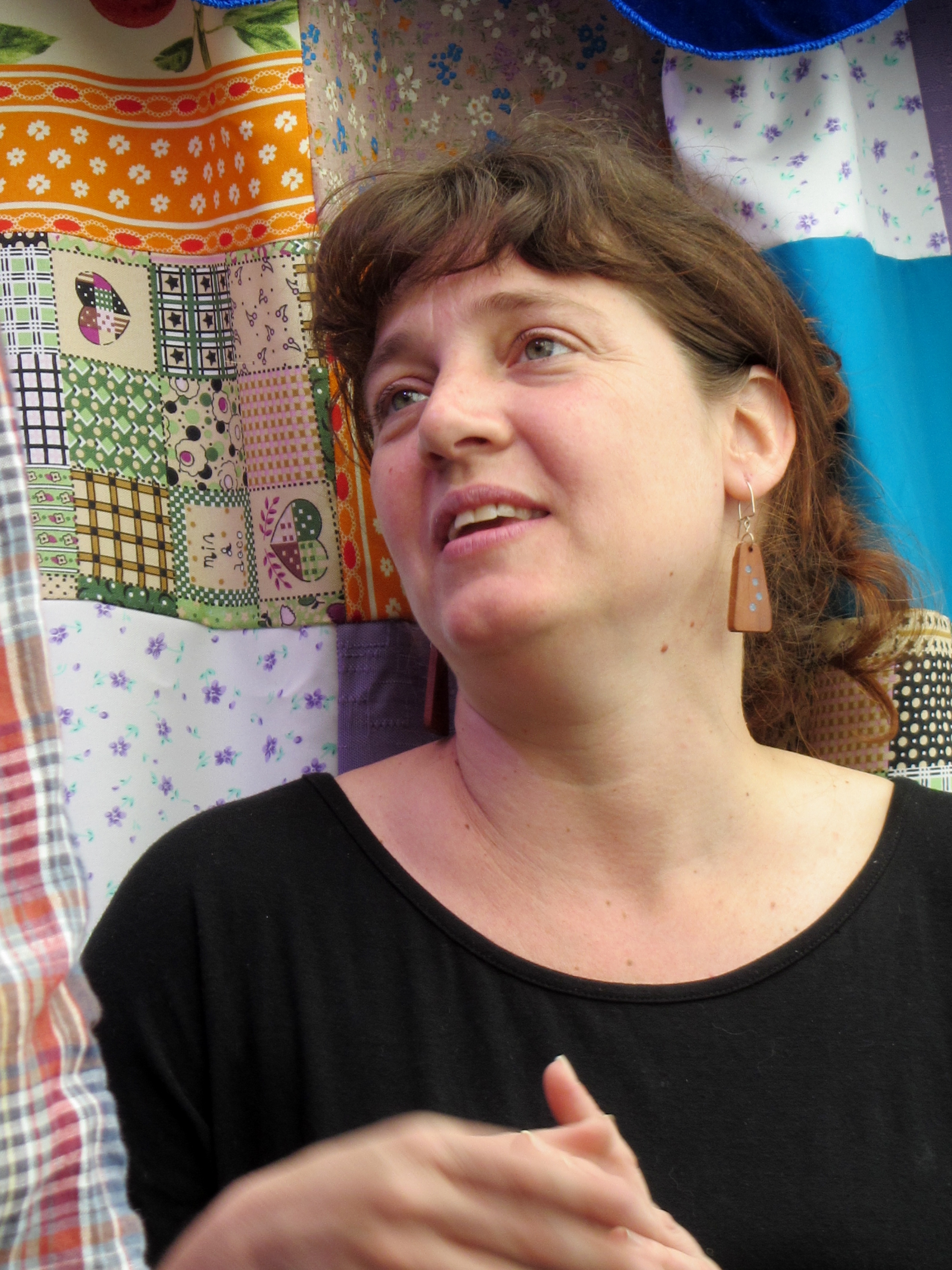
Fink has written all the works in the series

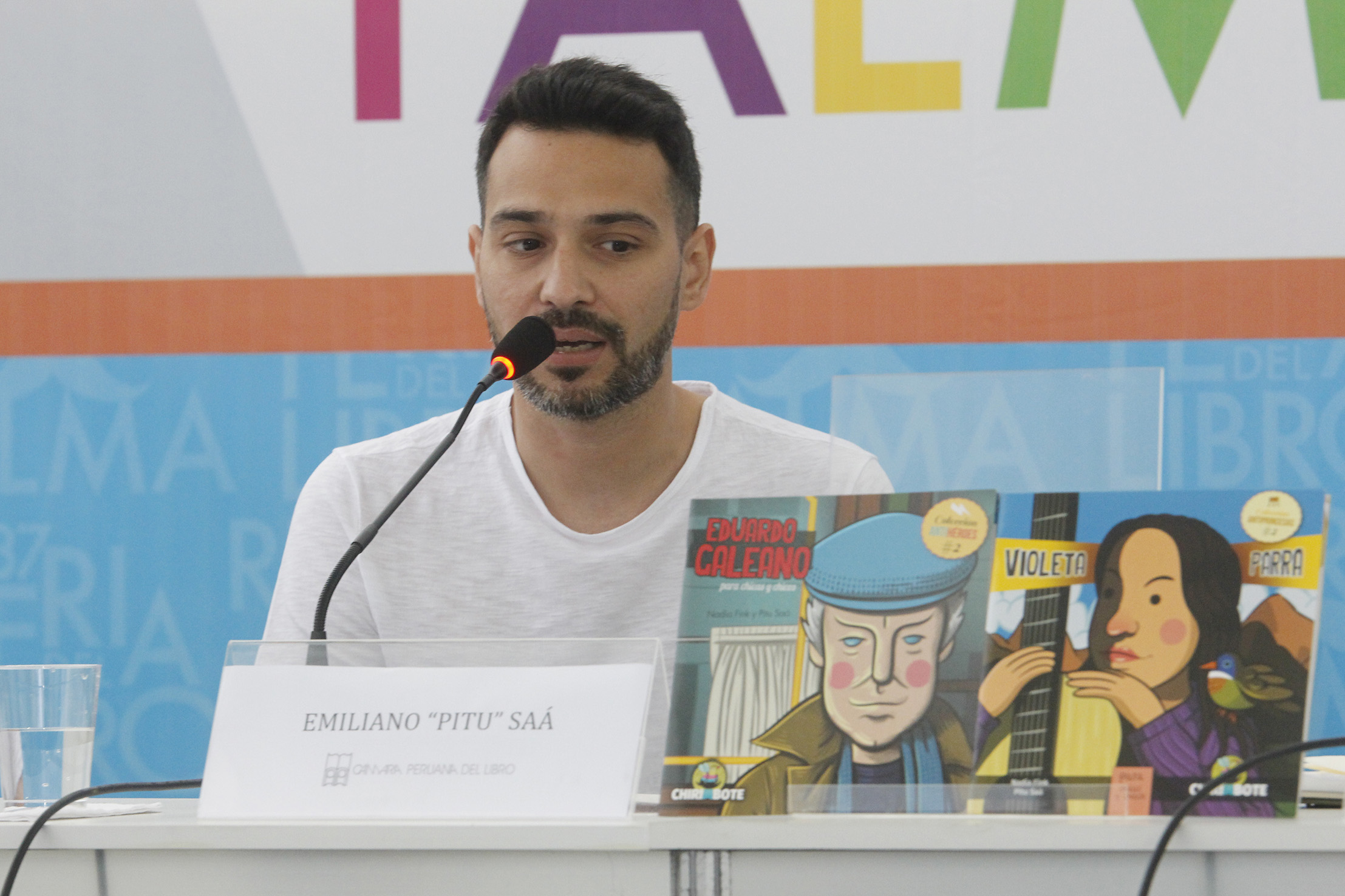
Saá has illustrated all the works in the series

Nadia Fink was compelled to begin writing the Anti-Princess Series to counter what she perceived as the unfair representation of women in works for children. Fink described visiting newsstands and seeing alternative literature for teenagers and adults, but little geared at children. Following a period of research, Fink began writing the first two volumes, that concerned Frida Kahlo and Violeta Parra, respectively.

Fink's interest was specifically in figures who "dared to break with the molds of their own social context". She desired to create works in direct opposition to Disney Princesses and Barbie dolls, popular characters which young girls commonly aspire to. To Fink, traditional princess narratives "convey that stillness preserves you from difficult situations", so she sought to craft works which subverted the damsel-in-distress narrative and privileged the works of the subjects featured over their romantic lives. The books respond to common tropes in princess stories/fairytales; for instance, the Violeta Parra edition explains that when Parra lacked the fashionable clothes required to perform, no fairy godmother appeared to come to her aid, and instead, her mother sewed her a skirt from a curtain.

Fink described a desire not to "underestimate children" with the series. While the works intentionally mention certain mature elements of their subjects' lives (such as that Kahlo had relationships with men and women besides her husband or that Parra's first husband abandoned her when she would not acquiesce to his desire that she become a housewife), they do not mention other notable elements of their subjects' lives, such as Parra's suicide. Fink sought to cover the lives of those she included in the series in a way that reflected the difficulties they faced during their lifetimes. However, upon the publication of the first book in the series in 2015, she deemed the lives of certain figures she was considering for the collection, such as poets Alejandra Pizarnik and Alfonsina Storni, to be "too tragic" for their own books. (She later released a volume about Storni nonetheless.)

The Anti-Hero Series, which Fink clarified is not about antiheroes but instead "anti-superheroes", began with a book about Argentine novelist Julio Cortázar. When asked why she chose not to opt for an Anti-Prince series for concordance with the Anti-Princess Series, Fink stated that she felt that princes did not occupy children's imagination like princesses, whereas "superheroes are places where the masculine stereotype can develop, the one with the strength, the superpower, which is mocked and ignored until everyone discovers that he is a genius who can save the world. These men, anti-heroes, have superpowers, but in Cortazar's case it is the superpower of the word put into play". Rosangela Fernandes Eleutério, a researcher in Brazil, said that the Anti-Hero Series covering men who were sensitive and sweet served to productively undermine traditional stereotypes of masculine emotionlessness.

== Publication ==
The series is published in Spanish by independent Buenos Aires-based children's publisher Chirimbote, which was founded by Fink, Saá, and Azcurra. Early works in the series were published in collaboration with Sudestada, a magazine for which Fink wrote, although by mid-2016, Chirimbote had become the sole publisher. The first book, Frida Kahlo for Girls and Boys (Spanish: Frida Kahlo para chicas y chicos), was released in Argentina in June 2015. The books are suggested for children aged six to 12.

By 2017, the series began receiving Portuguese translations and distribution in Brazil by publisher Sur and English translations by Barbara Megen Alvarado and Jesús Alvarado with publication by Books del Sur in the United States. Chirimbote has also released Spanish-language audiobooks of some of the titles, narrated by Mora Seoane.

== Reception ==
The Anti-Princess and Anti-Hero Series have received praise for their depictions of their historical subjects, their efforts to weaken established gender roles, and their illustrations. Researchers Juliana Petermann and Desireè Ribas Fumagalli wrote favorably of the series' choice to subvert traditional fairytale structure by featuring real historical figures, especially those "who could have led a princess life" but opted not to. In another article, researchers María Morales and Giulietta Piantoni praised Fink's handling of her subjects' flaws and wrote that portraying them as real people made them relatable to readers. Their otherwise positive review said that the books choosing to overlook some negative elements of their subjects' lives (like suicide) while showing others was antithetical to the collections' goal of treating their young readers as mature and capable of handling difficult topics.

A School Library Journal review described Saá's artwork as featuring "vibrant, bold colors outlined in black" which was "often graphic novel-like" and which "enhances the view of the subjects as strong heroines." Eleutério wrote that Saá's illustrations were captivating and found the works over "playful, easy to read", and delightful to both children and adults.

== Works ==
All works are written by Nadia Fink and illustrated by Pitu Saá and originally published in Spanish.

Anti-Princess Series books
Number	Title	Subject(s)	Release year	ISBN
1	Frida Kahlo para chicas y chicos	Frida Kahlo	2015	ISBN 978-987-33-9158-3
2	Violeta Parra para chicas y chicos	Violeta Parra	2015	ISBN 978-987-33-9159-0
3	Juana Azurduy para chicas y chicos	Juana Azurduy de Padilla	2015	ISBN 978-987-33-9157-6
4	Clarice Lispector para chicas y chicos	Clarice Lispector	2016	ISBN 978-987-42-0190-4
5	Gilda para chicas y chicos	Gilda	2016	ISBN 978-987-42-1305-1
6	Alfonsina Storni para chicas y chicos	Alfonsina Storni	2017	ISBN 978-987-42-3388-2
7	Evita para chicas y chicos	Eva Perón	2017	ISBN 978-987-42-5955-4
8	La abuela de plaza de mayo para chicas y chicos	Mothers of the Plaza de Mayo	2018	ISBN 978-987-42-7104-4
9	Susy Shock para chicxs	Susy Shock	2018	ISBN 978-987-42-7487-8
10	María Remedios del Valle para chicas y chicos	María Remedios del Valle	2019	ISBN 978-987-47471-3-6
11	Micaela García La Negra para chicas y chicos	Micaela García	2020	ISBN 978-987-47471-4-3
12	Rosa Luxemburgo para chicas y chicos	Rosa Luxemburg	2021	ISBN 9789878432182
13	Antiprincesas del voto femenino	Alicia Moreau de Justo, Julieta Lanteri	2021	ISBN 9789878432212

Anti-Hero Series books
Number	Title	Subject(s)	Release year	ISBN
1	Julio Cortázar para chicas y chicos	Julio Cortázar	2015	ISBN 978-987-33-9820-9
2	Eduardo Galeano para chicas y chicos	Eduardo Galeano	2016	ISBN 978-987-42-0674-9
3	Che Guevara para chicas y chicos	Che Guevara	2016	ISBN 978-987-42-2896-3
4	Gauchito Gil para chicas y chicos	Gauchito Gil	2017	ISBN 978-987-42-5177-0
5	Silvio Rodriguez para chicas y chicos	Silvio Rodriguez	2020	ISBN 978-987-47677-4-5
6	Marcelo Bielsa para chicas y chicos	Marcelo Bielsa	2020	ISBN 978-987-84320-0-7

League of Anti-Princesses books
Number	Title	Subject(s)	Release year	ISBN
1	Heroínas de la independencia: El origen ("Heroines of Independence: The Origin")	Juana Azurduy de Padilla, Bartolina Sisa, Martina Chapanay, Victoria Romero, María Remedios del Valle, Micaela Bastidas	2016	ISBN 978-987-42-2251-0
2	Berta Cáceres, guardiana de los ríos ("Berta Cáceres, Guardian of the Rivers")	Berta Cáceres and those featured in # 1	2017	ISBN 978-987-42-4770-4
3	Dandara: La rebelión esclava ("Dandara: The Slave Rebellion")	Dandara dos Palmares, the lancers of Artigas, Juana Azurduy de Padilla, María Remedios del Valle	2019	ISBN 978-987-47290-4-0
4	Guerreras de la independencia ("Women Warriors of Independence")	María Remedios del Valle, Martina Silva, Micaela Bastidas, Bartolina Sisa, Martina Céspedes, the lancers of Artigas, Juana Azurduy de Padilla, Manuela Sáenz	2020	ISBN 978-987-47677-3-8
5	Las antiprincesas salvan el carnaval ("The Anti-Princesses Save the Carnival")	Berta Cáceres, Martina Chapanay, Dandara, María Remedios del Valle, Juana Azurduy de Padilla, Policarpa Salavarrieta, Marielle Franco	2023	ISBN 9789878432427
