= Florida Book Award =

Annual book awsard in Florida, United States

The Florida Book Awards are a set of annual statewide literary awards that recognize Floridian authors and books about Florida published in the previous year. Established in 2006, the awards are administered by the Florida State University Libraries, with co-sponsors including the Florida Humanities Council, Florida Center for the Book, the State Library and Archives of Florida, and the Florida Historical Society.

Finalists are selected in eleven categories by three-member juries, with gold, silver, and bronze medals awarded. Cash prizes ranging from $500-$1,000 are awarded in three award categories, including the Phillip and Dana Zimmerman Gold Medal for Florida Nonfiction, the Gwen P. Reichert Gold Medal for Children’s Literature, and the Richard E. Rice Gold Medal Award for Visual Arts. Winners are recognized at the annual awards ceremony in Tallahassee, FL, in April.

Previous recipients of the Florida Book Award include Craig Pittman, Jack E. Davis, Edwidge Danticat, Arlo Haskell, Randy Wayne White, Lynne Barrett, Campbell McGrath, William McKeen, Carlton Ward Jr., Uva de Aragón, and Patricia Engel.
