= Alexa Clay =

American writer

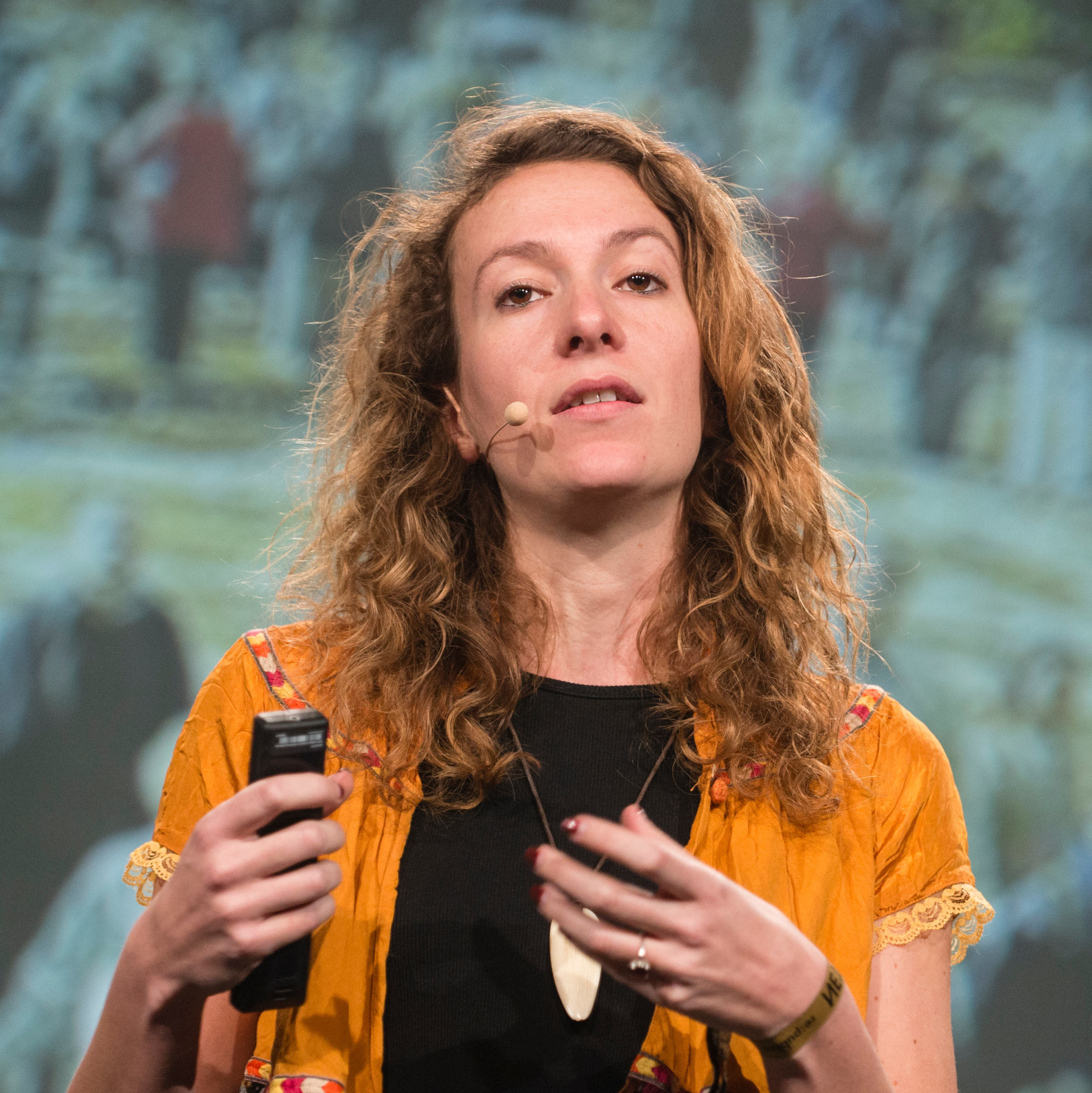
Alexa Clay in 2019

Alexa Clay (born March 21, 1984, in Cambridge, Massachusetts) is an American writer, public speaker and researcher with a focus on subculture, informal economy, and new economic thinking.

== Biography ==
Clay grew up the daughter of two anthropologists. She has written about her experience growing up with psychiatrist and alien abduction research Dr. John E. Mack for Aeon magazine. Clay received her BA from Brown University and an MSc in economic history from Oxford University.

In 2013, Clay started performing as "the Amish Futurist", an alter ego she developed to bring more existential reflection into the tech scene. The Amish Futurist has performed at SXSW, re:publica, Tech Open Air Berlin, and the DEAF Biennale.

Clay led work focused on scaling social innovation at Ashoka and co-founded the League of Intrapreneurs, a network focused on scaling the movement of social intrapreneurship. Along with John Elkington and Maggie de Pree she was the co-author of The Social Intrapreneur: A Field Guide for Corporate Changemakers, a report sponsored by the Skoll Foundation.

Clay is the co-author of The Misfit Economy, a book published by Simon & Schuster in 2015, that examines the role of creative thinking and ingenuity among society's "misfits". The Economist called the book "a paean to the quirkier members of society." The book was named a top business book to read by The Telegraph and the World Economic Forum. The Misfit Economy has also been reviewed by the Financial Times, Salon.com, the New Statesman, and the BBC. Clay has appeared in Dazed Digital, Vice, on public radio's Marketplace, The Takeaway, Australia's morning show Weekend Sunrise and the Laura Flanders Show. The Misfit Economy loosely inspired the NatGeo show Underworld Inc, for which Clay was a consulting producer.

Currently, Clay leads the Royal Society for the Encouragement of Arts, Manufactures, and Commerce in the U.S. working on topics like universal basic income, inclusive growth, and creativity in education. Clay has been active in the fields of social business, technology studies, and social change. She has been an advocate for "inclusive innovation", examining the ways in which entrepreneurs in the black market and informal economy are given access to economic opportunity.
