= Remainder (disambiguation) =

Remainder is the amount "left over" when dividing two integers.

Remainder may also refer to:

- Remaindered book, a publisher liquidating the remaining unsold copies of a book
- Remainder (law), in property law, a future interest created in a transferee
- Remainder term, in mathematics, when approximating a value by a series, is the error (the amount "left over") of an approximation, such that true value = series approximation + remainder term
- Remainder (novel), a novel by Tom McCarthy
- Remainder (film), a 2015 British film, based on the novel
- In remainder, relative to an aristocratic title, is being capable of inheriting it.
