= 2015 Man Booker Prize =

Literary award

The 2015 Booker Prize for Fiction was awarded at a ceremony on 13 October 2015. A longlist of thirteen titles was announced on 29 July, narrowed down to a shortlist of six titles on 15 September.

== Judging panel ==
- Michael Wood (chair)
- Ellah Wakatama Allfrey
- John Burnside
- Sam Leith
- Frances Osborne

== Nominees (shortlist) ==
Author	Title	Genre(s)	Country	Publisher
Marlon James	A Brief History of Seven Killings	Novel	Jamaica	Riverhead Books
Hanya Yanagihara	A Little Life	Novel	US	Doubleday Books
Anne Tyler	A Spool of Blue Thread	Novel	US	Knopf Publishing Group
Tom McCarthy	Satin Island	Novel	UK	Jonathan Cape
Chigozie Obioma	The Fishermen	Novel	Nigeria	Little, Brown and Company
Sunjeev Sahota	The Year of the Runaways	Novel	UK	Picador

== Nominees (longlist) ==
Author	Title	Genre(s)	Country	Publisher
Marlon James	A Brief History of Seven Killings	Novel	Jamaica	Riverhead Books
Hanya Yanagihara	A Little Life	Novel	US	Doubleday Books
Anne Tyler	A Spool of Blue Thread	Novel	US	Knopf Publishing Group
Bill Clegg	Did You Ever Have a Family	Novel	US	Gallery/Scout
Marilynne Robinson	Lila	Novel	US	Virago Press
Tom McCarthy	Satin Island	Novel	UK	Alfred A. Knopf
Anuradha Roy	Sleeping on Jupiter	Novel	India	Quercus
Anna Smaill	The Chimes	Novel	New Zealand	Hodder & Stoughton
Chigozie Obioma	The Fishermen	Novel	Nigeria	Little, Brown and Company
Anne Enright	The Green Road	Novel	Ireland	McClelland & Stewart
Andrew O'Hagan	The Illuminations	Novel	UK	Macmillan Publishers
Laila Lalami	The Moor's Account	Novel	US	Pantheon Books
Sunjeev Sahota	The Year of the Runaways	Novel	UK	Bloomsbury Publishing

== Winner ==
On 13 October, chair judge Michael Wood announced that Jamaican author Marlon James had won the 2015 Man Booker Prize for his novel A Brief History of Seven Killings. This is the first time that a Jamaican-born author has won the prize.

== See also ==
- List of winners and shortlisted authors of the Booker Prize for Fiction
