= Techno-Squid Eats Parliament =

American power-pop band

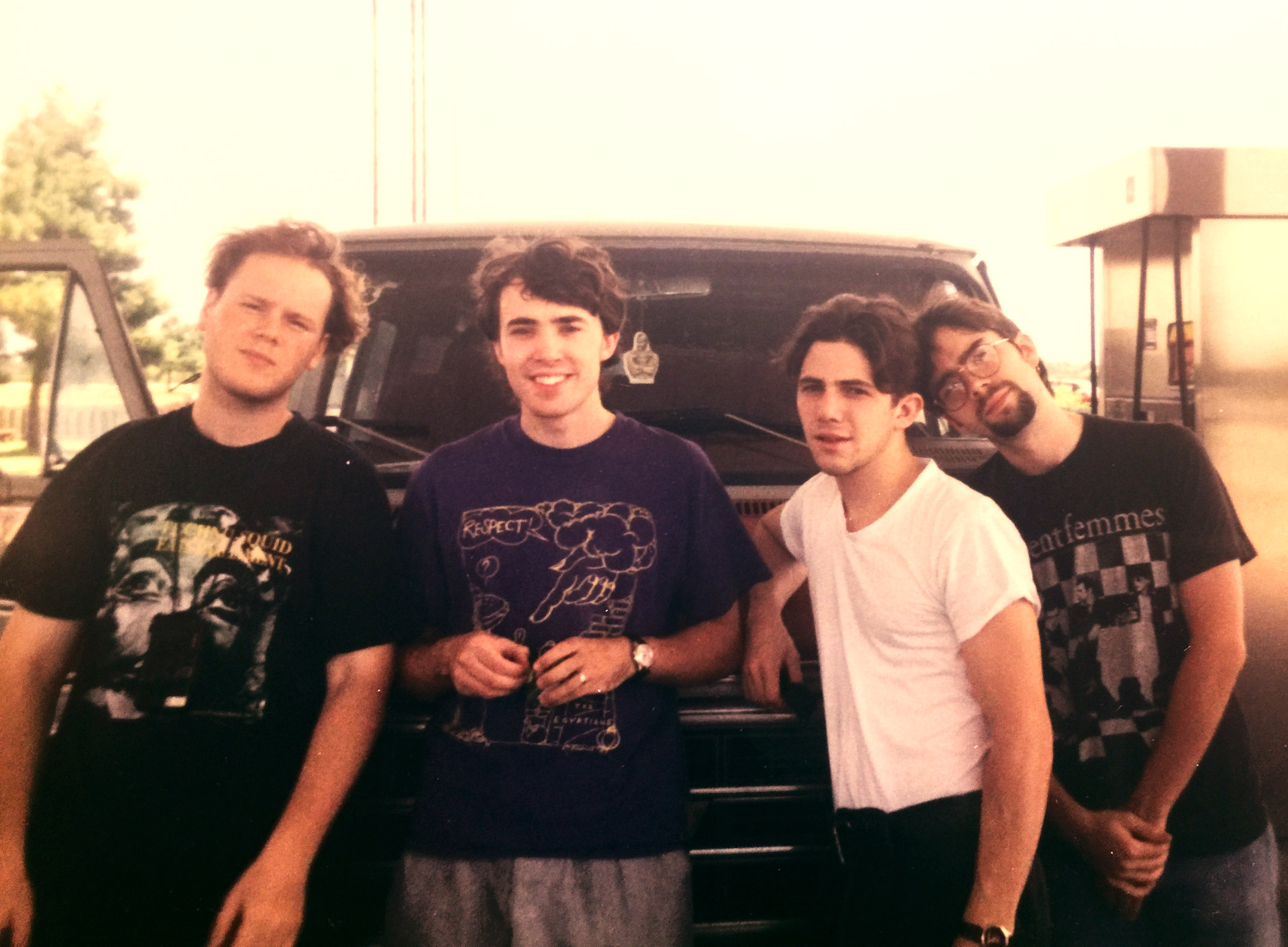

Techno-Squid Eats Parliament was a 1990s power-pop band based in Little Rock, Arkansas, that released a critically acclaimed eponymous album, produced by Grammy winner John Hampton on Ardent Records.

== History ==
Techno-Squid Eats Parliament formed in 1992 when childhood friends, Aaron Sarlo and Clay Bell began searching for a bassist and drummer to fill out their fledgling sound. Sarlo and Bell enlisted the help of Mark Pearrow on bass (Pearrow coined the band’s name) and Shayne Gray on drums. The band’s second show was as a contestant in the Spectrum Weekly Musicians’ Showcase in Little Rock. The judges for the competition were record producer Jim Dickinson, Jody Stephens of Big Star (who would go on to be the band’s A&R director), John Fry, and Rick Clark, a writer for Billboard Magazine. Techno-Squid Eats Parliament won their night, and shortly thereafter, signed to Ardent Records in Memphis.

Techno-Squid Eats Parliament toured extensively throughout America and Canada, playing SXSW, Crossroads Music Festival, NXNE, in support of their release on Ardent/Philips. The band enjoyed critical acclaim, but failed to catch on with mainstream audiences despite repeated coverage on MTV, opening for acts such as Cheap Trick, Cracker, and Alex Chilton, and press coverage in music industry mainstays like Billboard and CMJ. Techno-Squid Eats Parliament’s lackluster success is largely attributed to their unusual name (record shops would mistakenly stock the band’s album in the Funk section).

Their debut album was re-released on Philips Multimedia as one of the world’s first Enhanced CDs. The CD functioned both as a fully playable compact disc, and when played in a Macintosh personal computer, allowed fans to access additional content such as band interviews, videos, and a tour diary.

=== Disbandment ===
In 1995, Techno-Squid Eats Parliament disbanded when drummer, Shayne Gray, quit the band to star in Ira Sachs’s debut film, The Delta. In the wake of TSEP, Clay Bell moved to San Francisco to pursue a solo career, Aaron Sarlo went on to form punk band, Dangerous Idiots, and Mark Pearrow moved to Boston to work at the Massachusetts Institute of Technology as a research engineer and published author on web site usability.

=== Reformation ===
In 2015, after a 20 year break, Techno-Squid Eats Parliament reformed to release their follow up record, "We’re Back. What Did We Miss?"

== Discography ==
=== Albums ===
- Techno-Squid Eats Parliament (1994)
- We’re Back. What Did We Miss? (2015)

=== Singles ===
- "I Shot Your Boyfriend b/w Sometimes Things" [vinyl] (1994)

=== Other formats ===
- Techno-Squid Eats Parliament Enhanced CD (1995)
