= Kirsten Johnson =

American film director (born 1965)

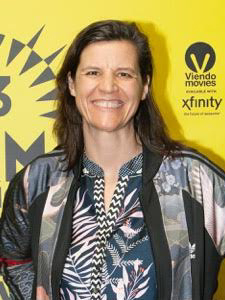
- Johnson in 2016
- Born: 1965 (age 60–61)
- Education: Brown University (BA)
- Occupations: Filmmaker; cinematographer
- Years active: 1987–present
- Relatives: Kirk Johnson (brother)

Kirsten Johnson (born 1965) is an American documentary filmmaker and cinematographer. She is mostly known for her camera work on several well-known feature-length documentaries such as Citizenfour and The Oath. In 2016, she released Cameraperson, a film which consists of various pieces of footage from her decades of work all over the world as a documentary cinematographer. Directed by Johnson herself, Cameraperson went on to be praised for its handling of themes about documentary ethics interwoven with Johnson's personal reflection on her experiences.

Movies that Johnson has either filmed or directed have received numerous nominations and awards over the years, and she is now a member of the Academy of Motion Picture Arts and Sciences.

== Early life ==
Kirsten Johnson was born in 1965. Her father is C. Richard Johnson, a psychiatrist.

Johnson was raised in Seattle and Wyoming in a Seventh-day Adventist family who placed restrictions on her access to film and television. She had no exposure to the medium until she attended Brown University. At Brown, Johnson was involved in Students Against Apartheid and took classes with Anani Dzidzienyo, who influenced her significantly. She graduated from there in 1987 with a BA in Fine Arts and Literature.

== Career ==
=== Cinematography ===
After graduating Johnson entered the filmmaking world in West Africa, where she got her start in both fiction and nonfiction genres. She then studied film in Paris, and went on to be a principal cameraperson for a variety of documentaries, traveling to numerous countries to do so. In total, she has over 40 credits as cinematographer. Including other jobs in the camera and electrical department, she has a total of over 70 credits in different movies. Some of her film credits include Derrida (2002), a documentary on French philosopher Jacques Derrida, the documentary Darfur Now (2006), and Pray the Devil Back to Hell (2008) which won the Tribeca Film Festival Best Documentary. She also worked on The Oath (2010) and Citizenfour (2014), both directed by Laura Poitras. The Oath is about Osama bin Laden's driver, Abu Jandal, for which Johnson won an award from Sundance. Citizenfour, which won the 2015 Academy Award for Best Documentary Feature, concerns Edward Snowden and his revelations about the NSA. Johnson has shot films about everything from the Evangelical Christian chastity movement (Virgin Tales, 2012), to terrorism in the Middle East (The Oath). Her cinematography is also featured in Michael Moore's Fahrenheit 9/11, the Academy Award-nominated short Asylum, the Emmy-winning Ladies First, and the Sundance premiere documentaries Finding North, This Film Is Not Yet Rated, and American Standoff.

=== Directing ===
Johnson has directed 6 films, her most notable being personal collage-style memoir Cameraperson (2016). It captures the connection between the director and the subjects that she had filmed during her years behind the camera. While she worked for 25 years as a cinematographer, she traveled around the world to places such as Bosnia, Darfur, Kabul and Texas. Especially in Bosnia, Afghanistan, and Yemen, she witnessed and captured emotional, sometimes traumatic, events and interviews. She accessed spare footage from the films she shot, and edited portions that were meaningful to her together for the experimental documentary film. Johnson's Cameraperson premiered at Sundance and won Sheffield Doc/Fest's Grand Jury Award in 2016.

In 2015 Johnson released a short film titled The Above. Just like Cameraperson, this film was made up of footage she initially shot for a different film. It focuses on a military surveillance balloon which is flown above the town of Kabul in Afghanistan for unknown reasons. The Above premiered at the New York Film Festival. Additionally, her 1999 film Innocent Until Proven Guilty examines the number of African American men in the U.S. criminal justice system.

Her second documentary, Dick Johnson Is Dead, premiered in 2020 at Sundance Film Festival, where it received a special award for innovation in nonfiction storytelling. The film is a dedication to her father and an exploration of human mortality.

== Personal life ==
Johnson is based in Manhattan where she is an adjunct professor at New York University. Her brother, Kirk Johnson, is the Sant Director of Smithsonian's National Museum of Natural History.

Johnson co-parents her twins with a married couple, painter Boris Torres and filmmaker Ira Sachs. She, Sachs, and Torres were in similar social circles, became friends, and decided to have the experience of parenting together. They now live in neighboring apartments in Manhattan, and split the twins' time equally between both parties.
