= A Spool of Blue Thread =

2015 novel by Anne Tyler

- First edition
- Author: Anne Tyler
- Audio read by: Kimberly Farr
- Cover artist: Kelly Blair
- Published: 2015
- Publisher: Alfred A. Knopf
- Pages: 368
- ISBN: 978-1101874271

A Spool of Blue Thread, published in 2015, is Anne Tyler’s 20th novel.

== Summary ==
Tyler's story encompasses three generations of the Whitshank family, wandering back and forth over 7 decades of the 20th century. As in many of her previous novels, Tyler explores the resentments that develop and fester between siblings, spouses, and in parent-child connections—as well as their affectionate bonds. “She predisposes her characters to crave the unattainable—parental love (in both directions), a sense of belonging, ... forgiveness, amnesty from familial wrongdoing, the comfort of home.” Much of the story is built around Abby—as mother of four, as wife, as daughter-in-law—and around a sprawling Baltimore house with a huge wrap-around porch and the “power to draw the family back to it over generations.” The house almost acts like an additional character, interacting with builders, repairers, and family members coming and going. The story’s principal characters include a mysterious prodigal son (Denny) who has a hard time with commitment (to his family, to any job, career, project, or partner); an “adopted” (unsanctioned) and reliable son (Stem) and his beautiful, evangelical, overly helpful wife (Nora); Abby’s husband Red, the “maintainer” of the capacious house that his socially mobile, “backwoods” father (Junior) originally built for another family; and Junior's wife (Linnie) who entrapped him at age 13. “Give or take a few details, this extended/blended/fouled-up family could be any of ours. That makes it ... quintessential Anne Tyler.”

== Reviews ==
The New York Times veteran reviewer Michiko Kakutani has reviewed many of Tyler's novels and given both glowing and highly critical reviews. This novel she found substandard: “It recycles virtually every theme and major plot she has used in the past and does so in the most perfunctory manner imaginable....A disappointing performance by this talented author, who seems to be coasting on automatic pilot.”

A second The New York Times reviewer, Rebecca Pepper Sinkler, gave a much more positive review: “Tyler has a knack for turning sitcom situations into something far deeper and more moving. Her great gift is playing against the American dream, the dark side of which is the falsehood at its heart:that given hard work and good intentions, any family can attain the Norman Rockwell ideal of happiness...”

The New Yorker magazine also provided a positive, though brief, account: “This airy saga examines three generations of a Baltimore family. In warm, lucid prose, Tyler skips back and forth through the twentieth century to depict the Whitshanks...The narrative is as nebulous and interconnected as a long conversation with a relative, peppered with family sects, well-worn anecdotes, and accounts of domestic squabbles....”

== Awards ==
On April 13, 2015, A Spool of Blue Thread was one of six novels shortlisted for Baileys Women's Prize for Fiction. The prize was established in 1996 for the best novel written in English by a woman of any nationality. It was also shortlisted for the 2015 Man Booker Prize.
