= Did You Ever Have a Family =

Debut novel by Bill Clegg

Did You Ever Have A Family
- First edition
- Author: Bill Clegg
- Language: English
- Genre: Fiction
- Publisher: Gallery/Scout Press
- Publication date: September 2015
- Publication place: United States
- Pages: 304
- ISBN: 9781476798172
- Dewey Decimal: 813/.6

Did You Ever Have a Family is the debut novel by American literary agent and author Bill Clegg, published in 2015.

== Plot summary ==
The novel focuses on June Reid, a beautiful, rich Connecticut woman. On the night before her daughter's wedding, June Reid loses her daughter, her daughter's fiancé, her ex-husband, and her boyfriend in a tragic house fire. Grief-stricken, she drives across the country to Washington. Over the course of her journey, details slowly emerge about what caused the fire and its impact on the community.

== Characters ==
- June Reid – bereaved mother, girlfriend and ex-wife
- Luke Morey – June's boyfriend
- Silas Riley – teenager employed by Luke
- Cissy – The Moonstone's housekeeper
- Lydia Morey née Hannafin – Luke's mother
- Rebecca – co-owner of The Moonstone hotel, Kelly's girlfriend
- Kelly – co-owner of The Moonstone hotel, Rebecca's girlfriend
- Lolly Reid – June's daughter
- Will Landis – Lolly's fiancé
- Adam – June's ex-husband
- Winton – lottery scammer
- Edith – florist hired for Lolly and Will's wedding
- Rick – son of the caterer hired for Lolly and Will's wedding
- Dale Landis – Will's father
- George – businessman, Luke's father
- Rex – Lydia's ex-boyfriend
- Ben – Cissy's deceased husband
- Earl Morey – Lydia's ex-husband

== Reception ==
Did You Ever Have a Family received reviews from, amongst others, The New York Times, the Financial Times, The Guardian, The Independent and The Daily Telegraph.

In The New York Times, Kaui Hart Hemmings called the novel "masterly" and "thoughtful", noting that it is the characters' "complicated pasts... far more than the immediate concerns of the present or the obvious burdens of grief" and "connection — the way people and their lives fuse" that Clegg is interested in exploring.

In the Financial Times, Suzi Feay noted that Clegg has "an eye for characters who cannot easily fit into the boxes that society has assigned" even if the main protagonist "June remains a puzzle, and hazily unconvincing". While praising Clegg for his ability to "not fall into the obvious trap of giving regular characters bigger vocabularies and more elaborate syntax than they would typically use", she also criticised his writing for being "generally plain and even unambitious", with the cast of characters' voices "not hugely differentiated".

== Recognition ==
- 2015 - National Book Award, longlist
- 2015 - Man Booker Prize, longlist
