= Omer Fast =

Israeli artist (born 1972)

Omer Fast עומר פסט
- Born: 1972 (age 53–54); Jerusalem, Israel
- Known for: video artist
- Awards: Bucksbaum Award

Omer Fast (Hebrew: עומר פסט; born in Jerusalem, 1972) is an Israeli contemporary artist who lives and works in Berlin.

== Early life and education ==
Born and raised in Jerusalem, Fast spent much of his teenage years in New York. He received his BFA from a dual-degree program at Tufts University and the School of the Museum of Fine Arts, Boston in 1995, majoring in English and painting, and received an MFA from Hunter College in 2000. He subsequently got a job doing magazine layout before moving to Berlin in 2001.

== Exhibitions ==
Fast has had solo exhibitions at the Pinakothek der Moderne, Munich (2020), Guangdong Times Art Museum (2018), Martin Gropius Bau, Berlin (2016), Jeu de Paume, Paris (2015), Wexner Center for the Arts, Columbus (2012), Whitney Museum of American Art, New York (2010), Berkeley Art Museum (2009), Museum of Modern Art, Vienna (2007), Carnegie Museum, Pittsburgh (2005), Midway Contemporary Art, Minneapolis (2005), Pinakothek der Moderne, Munich (2004), and the Frankfurter Kunstverein, Frankfurt (2003). His work has also been featured in dOCUMENTA (13) (2012), Performa (2009), and the 54th Venice Biennale. In 2016 the Martin-Gropius-Bau in Berlin presented the exhibition "Omer Fast. Talking is not always the solution". His work has been exhibited in the United States and internationally. In October 2015, a monographic exhibition of Fast’s work titled Present Continuous opened at the Jeu de Paume, Paris, and subsequently traveled to the Baltic Center for Contemporary Art, Gateshead, UK, and the KUNSTEN Museum of Modern Art, Aalborg, Denmark. He has been the subject of solo exhibitions at the Stedelijk Museum in Amsterdam, the Netherlands; Moderna Museet, Stockholm, Sweden; La Caixa, Madrid, Spain; Musée d’Art Contemporain, Montréal, Canada; Museum of Contemporary Art, Krakow, Poland; STUK Leuven, Belgium; Dallas Museum of Art, TX; Cleveland Museum of Art, OH; the Art Institute of Chicago, IL; the Minneapolis Institute of Art, MN; and the Whitney Museum of American Art, NY. His work was featured in dOCUMENTA (13), the 54th Venice Biennale, and the 2002 and 2008 Whitney Biennials.

== Feature films ==
Fast wrote and directed his debut feature film Remainder in 2015, based on the 2005 novel of the same name by Tom McCarthy. It stars Tom Sturrdige and Cush Jumbo. Lorena Muñoz-Alonso of Artnet compared Fast's avant-garde style to that of Steve McQueen and Sam Taylor-Johnson, urging audiences not "to expect an easily consumable feature." Fast said that he was inspired to make the film after being introduced to the book by a journalist colleague. The film was generally well received by critics.

== Controversy ==
In 2017, Fast's solo exhibition at James Cohan Gallery in New York City generated controversy when a coalition of Asian-American groups entered and protested the installation, making claims that the work was orientalist, gentrifying, and colonizing as it traded in stereotypes of Chinatown aesthetics. In a statement, Fast wrote that in re-creating the appearance of the building before the gallery moved in, he sought to heighten "the tension between appearance and essence" of the immigrant experience, which he related to his own as an Israel-born naturalized American. Fast is no longer represented by the James Cohan Gallery.

== Awards and collections ==
Fast was the recipient of the 2009 Preis der Nationalgalerie für Junge Kunst and the 2008 Bucksbaum Award from the Whitney Museum of American Art. Fast's work is in the collections of the Whitney Museum of American Art, the Solomon R. Guggenheim Museum, the Hamburger Bahnhof, the Metropolitan Museum of Art, the Hirshhorn Museum and Sculpture Garden, and the Museum of Modern Art, Vienna.

== Bibliography ==
- Sabine Schaschl (ed.): "Omer Fast. In Memorry / Zur Erinnerung", Berlin (The Green Box) 2010. (English/German) ISBN 978-3-941644-14-4
- “The Casting” (Monograph) Published by Museum of Modern Art, Vienna and Walter König Verlag, 2008 ISBN 978-3-86560-403-3
- Astrid Wege, "Cologne, Omer Fast, Kölnischer Kunstverein", Artforum, Feb 2012
- Barbara Pollack, "True Lies?", ART News, February 2010
- Andreas Schlaegel, "Nothing But the Truth", Programma Magazine, Spring 2010
- Mark Godfrey, TJ Demos, Eyal Weizman, Ayesha Hammed, "Rights of Passage", Tate Etc., Issue # 19, 2010
- Nav Haq, "Foresight into the New African Century", Kaleidoscope #5, Feb 2010
- Holland Cotter, "Is It Reality or Fantasy?" New York Times, January 7, 2010
- Elisabeth Lebovici / Maria Muhle, Omer Fast, Afterall, March 2009
- Chen Tamir, "Omer fast, New Magic Realism", Flash Art, Issue #114, October 2008
- Tom Holert, "Attention Span", Artforum, February 2008
- Mark Godfrey, "Making History", Frieze, March/April 2006
- Nav Haq, "Omer Fast, Godville", Bidoun, 2005
- Jennifer Allen, "Openings: Omer Fast", Artforum, September 2003
- Chris Chang, "Vision: Omer Fast", Film Comment, July/August 2003
- Marcus Verhagen, ‘Pleasure and Pain: Omer Fast Interviewed’ in Art Monthly Issue 330, October 2009 Brittania Art Publications LTD. Pp 1-4
- "Omer Fast: Back to the Present" in Displayer. February 2009. pp 113-118
- Omer Fast et al., The Death of the Artist (New York: Cabinet Books, 2019). ISBN 9781932698893, 1932698892
