= The Delta (film) =

- DVD release poster
- Directed by: Ira Sachs
- Screenplay by: Ira Sachs; Mauricio Zacharias
- Distributed by: Strand Releasing
- Release date: September 9, 1996 (Toronto)
- Running time: 85 minutes
- Country: United States

The Delta is an American dramatic LGBT film directed by Ira Sachs. It premiered at the Toronto International Film Festival on September 9, 1996. The 85 minute film was shot on 16 mm film. It won the "Outstanding Emerging Talent" award at Outfest in 1997, and was also nominated for the "Producer's Award" (for producer Margot Bridger) at the 1997 and 1998 Independent Spirit Awards.

== Plot ==
The Delta tells the story of 18-year-old Lincoln Bloom, who, after leading a relatively straight teenage life, is slowly drawn into the LGBT world and discovers his attraction towards men. After visiting various shady establishments (including gay bars, video arcades, etc.) and engaging in sexual acts with "men he didn't know," Lincoln meets Minh Nguyen, a Vietnamese immigrant, and travels down river with him in a cabin cruiser. In a doomed relationship, the two bond with each other, Lincoln neglecting to tell his girlfriend and leading two parallel lives.

== Cast ==
- Shayne Gray as Lincoln Bloom
- Thang Chan as Minh Nguyen (John)
- Rachel Zan Huss as Monica Rachel
- Colonious Davis as Ricky Little
- Charles J. Ingram as David Bloom

== Production ==
The Delta was filmed entirely in Memphis, Tennessee, Sachs's hometown.

== Reception and legacy ==
The film received mostly positive reviews, with IndieWire calling it the "essence of independent film." Kevin Thomas of the Los Angeles Times called it "...so evocative that it is poetic in its impact." However, it was also criticized by The New York Times and others for leaving viewers with too many questions and moving too abruptly from plotline to plotline.

On Rotten Tomatoes, The Delta has an approval rating of 75% based on 8 reviews, with an average rating of 6.5/10.

A digitally restored version of the film will be released on Blu-ray by The Criterion Collection on May 12, 2026, along with two of Sachs's shorts: Vaudeville (1991) and Lady (1993).
