= C (novel) =

2010 novel written by Tom McCarthy

- First edition (UK)
- Author: Tom McCarthy
- Language: English
- Publisher: Jonathan Cape (UK); Knopf (US)
- Publication date: 2010
- Publication place: United Kingdom
- Media type: Print (Hardcover & Paperback)
- Pages: 400

C is a 2010 novel written by Tom McCarthy. C is McCarthy's third novel and sixth book. The novel was shortlisted for the Booker Prize. Critics were polarized by the work.

== Plot ==
The novel revolves around Serge Carrefax, born in the late 19th century in England. The plot follows his life before and after World War I.

== Themes ==
A major theme in the novel is communication, and the way technology influences the way individuals and societies communicate.

== Reception ==
Jennifer Egan, writing for the New York Times, referred to the novel as fusing "Pynchonesque revelry in signs and codes with the lush psychedelics of William Burroughs". Leo Robson, in a review for the New Statesman, describes the book as "full of familiar delights and familiar tedium". It continues "After a certain point, most sentences go something like this (not a parody): "Everything seems connected: disparate locations twitch and burst into activity like limbs reacting to impulses sent from elsewhere in the body, booms and jibs obeying levers at the far end of a complex set of ropes and cogs and relays."
