= Sunjeev Sahota =

British novelist (born 1981)

- Born: 1981 (age 44–45); Derby, United Kingdom
- Education: Imperial College London
- Occupation: Novelist

Sunjeev Sahota FRSL (born 1981) is a British novelist whose first novel, Ours are the Streets, was published in January 2011 and whose second novel, The Year of the Runaways, was shortlisted for the 2015 Man Booker Prize and was awarded a European Union Prize for Literature in 2017.

== Background ==
Sahota was born in 1981 in Derby, and his family moved to Chesterfield when he was seven years old attending Springwell Community School. His paternal grandparents had emigrated to Britain from Punjab, India, in 1966. After finishing school, Sahota studied mathematics at Imperial College London. As of January 2011, he was working in marketing for the insurance company Aviva.

Sahota had not read a novel until he was 18 years old, when he read Salman Rushdie's Midnight's Children while visiting relatives in India before starting university. He bought the book in the airport before flying to India. While he had studied English literature at GCSE level, the course did not require students to read a novel:

We had to do a Shakespeare, and we did Macbeth. We had to do a pre 20th-century text, and we did a play, She Stoops to Conquer. We had to do poetry and we did Yevgeny Yevtushenko. But no novels.

After Midnight's Children, Sahota went on to read The God of Small Things, A Suitable Boy and The Remains of the Day. In an interview in January 2011, he stated:

It was like I was making up for lost time – not that I had to catch up, but it was as though I couldn't quite believe this world of storytelling I had found and I wanted to get as much of it down me as I possibly could.

In 2013 he was included in a Granta list of 20 best young writers, released 20 years after the magazine first published such a list.

In June 2018 Sahota was elected Fellow of the Royal Society of Literature in its "40 Under 40" initiative.

In 2019, Sahota started teaching creative writing to undergraduates at Durham University, where he is Assistant Professor.

== Works ==
Sahota's first novel, Ours are the Streets, was published in January 2011 by Picador. He wrote the book in the evenings and at weekends because of his day job. The novel tells the story of a British Pakistani youth who becomes a suicide bomber. Sahota was prompted to start writing the book by the 7 July 2005 London bombings. According to the Sheffield Telegraph, the book is "being mentioned in literary supplements as one of the novels to look out for in 2011". Ours are the Streets has been reviewed in a number of national newspapers, including The Times, The Guardian, The Independent and The Sunday Times.

His second novel, The Year of the Runaways, about the experience of illegal immigrants in Britain, was published in June 2015 and was shortlisted for the 2015 Man Booker Prize.

China Room was published in 2021. It interweaves the stories of a child bride living in a village in 1920s Punjab and her British-born and raised great-grandson, who returns to the village in 1999. The novel was longlisted for the 2021 Booker Prize.

== Bibliography ==
- —— (2011). Ours Are the Streets. ISBN 9780330545778.
- —— (2016). The Year of the Runaways. ISBN 9781101946114.
- —— (2021). China Room. ISBN 9780593298213.
- —— (2024). The Spoiled Heart. ISBN 9780593655993.
