= The Making of Incarnation =

2021 novel by Tom McCarthy

- First edition
- Author: Tom McCarthy
- Language: English
- Publisher: Jonathan Cape (UK); Knopf (US)
- Publication place: United Kingdom

The Making of Incarnation is a 2021 novel by English writer Tom McCarthy.

== Conception and writing ==
The novel involves a search for a fictional missing item—Box 808—from the archive of Lillian Gilbreth. Gilbreth was a real-world figure known for her work on time and motion studies, applying that work to accelerate the rate at which industrial workers could accomplish tasks. In an essay for the London Review of Books, McCarthy referred to Gilbreth as a "fascinating figure". McCarthy has said he is "most [fascinated]" by "[...] the role literature played in her thinking."

== Reception ==
In a review published by the Wall Street Journal, Sam Sacks compared the work unfavorably to those of postmodern American novelist Don DeLillo, writing that The Making of Incarnation "[...] lacks Mr. DeLillo’s humor, his pleasure in absurdity". In his review, Sacks noted the superficial characterization of the book's protagonists, referring to them as "[...] nothing more than proper names". In a review for The New York Times, Giles Harvey referred to the characters similarly, writing: "They are manic ciphers, fixated on their intellectual quarry but devoid of inner life".

In a review for Booklist, Bill Kelly praised the novel's "Pynchonian asides filtered through a Joycean love of language."
