= Bill Clegg =

American literary agent and author

- Born: William Robert Clegg
- Education: Washington College
- Occupations: Literary agent; author
- Spouse: Van Scott Jr. (m. 2013)
- Parent(s): William Clegg Jr. Kathy Jeanne Ruscoe

William Robert "Bill" Clegg is an American literary agent and author. His first two memoirs detail his addiction to crack cocaine. His debut novel, Did You Ever Have a Family, received offers from four publishers and was longlisted for the 2015 Man Booker Prize.

== Personal life ==
Bill Clegg grew up in Sharon, Connecticut. His father William Clegg Jr. was a pilot with Trans World Airlines. His mother is Kathy Jeanne (née Ruscoe). He has two sisters and a brother.

Clegg is a graduate of Washington College.

He is gay and was in a long-term relationship with filmmaker Ira Sachs. Sachs based his film Keep the Lights On (2012) on their relationship.

In 2013, he married Van Scott Jr., a communications manager at CNN.

== Career ==
Upon the urging of a girlfriend, Clegg took the Radcliffe Publishing Course in 1993. This led to an entry-level position at the Robbins Office.

In March 2001, he and Sarah Burnes cofounded the literary agency Clegg and Burnes. The firm's roster of clients included Nicole Krauss, Susan Choi, Anne Carson, Nick Flynn, Salvatore Scibona, Akhil Sharma, David Gilbert, Stephen Elliott, and Andrew Sean Greer.

Clegg and Burnes abruptly closed under mysterious circumstances. It was later revealed that a contributing factor to the firm’s closure was Clegg disappearing on a drug binge.

After getting sober, Clegg returned to publishing and was an agent with William Morris Endeavor. Many of his former clients returned to him. He then moved on from WME to start the Clegg Agency. While at WME, Clegg began writing his memoirs.

== Bibliography ==
- Portrait of an Addict as a Young Man: a memoir (2010)
- Ninety Days: a memoir (2012)
- Did You Ever Have a Family: a novel (2015)
- The End of the Day: a novel (2020)

== Awards ==
Did You Ever Have a Family was longlisted by both the National Book Awards and the Man Booker Prize.
