= Remainder (novel) =

Novel by Tom McCarthy

- Cover of the first edition, published by Metronome Press in 2005
- Author: Tom McCarthy
- Language: English
- Publisher: Vintage
- Publication date: 2005 (Metronome); 13 February 2007 (Vintage)
- Publication place: United Kingdom
- Media type: Print (Hardcover & Paperback)
- Pages: 308 pp
- ISBN: 978-0-307-27835-7
- Dewey Decimal: 821/.92

Remainder is a 2005 novel by British author Tom McCarthy. It is McCarthy's third published work. It was first written in 2001, although not published until 2005 (in a limited run of 750 copies printed by the French Metronome Press). The novel was later re-printed by UK publishing house Alma Books; Vintage Books printed the book in the United States. The plot revolves around an unnamed narrator who has received a large financial settlement after an accident, and his obsession with recreating half-remembered events from his life before the incident.

Remainder was published to acclaim from critics. McCarthy received the 2007 Believer Book Award for the novel, after its republication.

== Plot summary ==
Remainder tells the story of an unnamed narrator traumatized by an accident which "involved something falling from the sky". Eight and a half million pounds richer due to a compensation settlement but hopelessly estranged from the world around him, the protagonist spends his time and money paying others to reconstruct and re-enact vaguely remembered scenes and situations from his past. These re-enactments are driven by a need to inhabit the world "authentically" rather than in the "second-hand" manner that his traumatic situation has bequeathed him. When the recreation of mundane events fails to quench this thirst for authenticity, he starts re-enacting more and more violent events, including drive-by shootings and a bank heist.

== Themes ==
Like much of McCarthy's work, the novel heavily features repetition and repeated actions. It also deals with amnesia and issues of memory.

== Reception ==
Writing in the Guardian, Patrick Ness called it "splendidly odd". The New Yorker noted that "McCarthy’s portrait of the pursuit of total control is arresting", while Peter Carty, in the Independent, said "McCarthy's prose is precise and unpretentious".

Novelist and essayist Zadie Smith wrote a long appreciation of the novel in her 2009 collection Changing My Mind.

== Film adaptation ==
A film adaptation written and directed by Israeli artist Omer Fast was released in 2015; it was Fast's first major film.
