= Satin Island =

Book by Tom McCarthy

- First edition (US)
- Author: Tom McCarthy
- Language: English
- Publisher: Knopf (US); Jonathan Cape (UK)
- Publication date: 2015
- Publication place: United Kingdom
- Media type: Print (Hardcover & Paperback)
- Pages: 208
- ISBN: 978-0-224-09019-3

Satin Island is a 2015 novel written by Tom McCarthy. It is McCarthy's fourth novel and fifth book.

== Plot ==
The novel follows a protagonist, "U.", an employee of "the Company" which is a consulting firm. U is a former anthropologist who now applies his skills to cases handled by the company.

== Reception ==
The novel was well received. Duncan White, writing for The Telegraph, praised the novel's conclusion, saying it "...provokes and beguiles and, at the point of revelation, it withholds".

It was included on the shortlist of the 2015 Man Booker Prize.
