= Aaron Sarlo =

American singer-songwriter

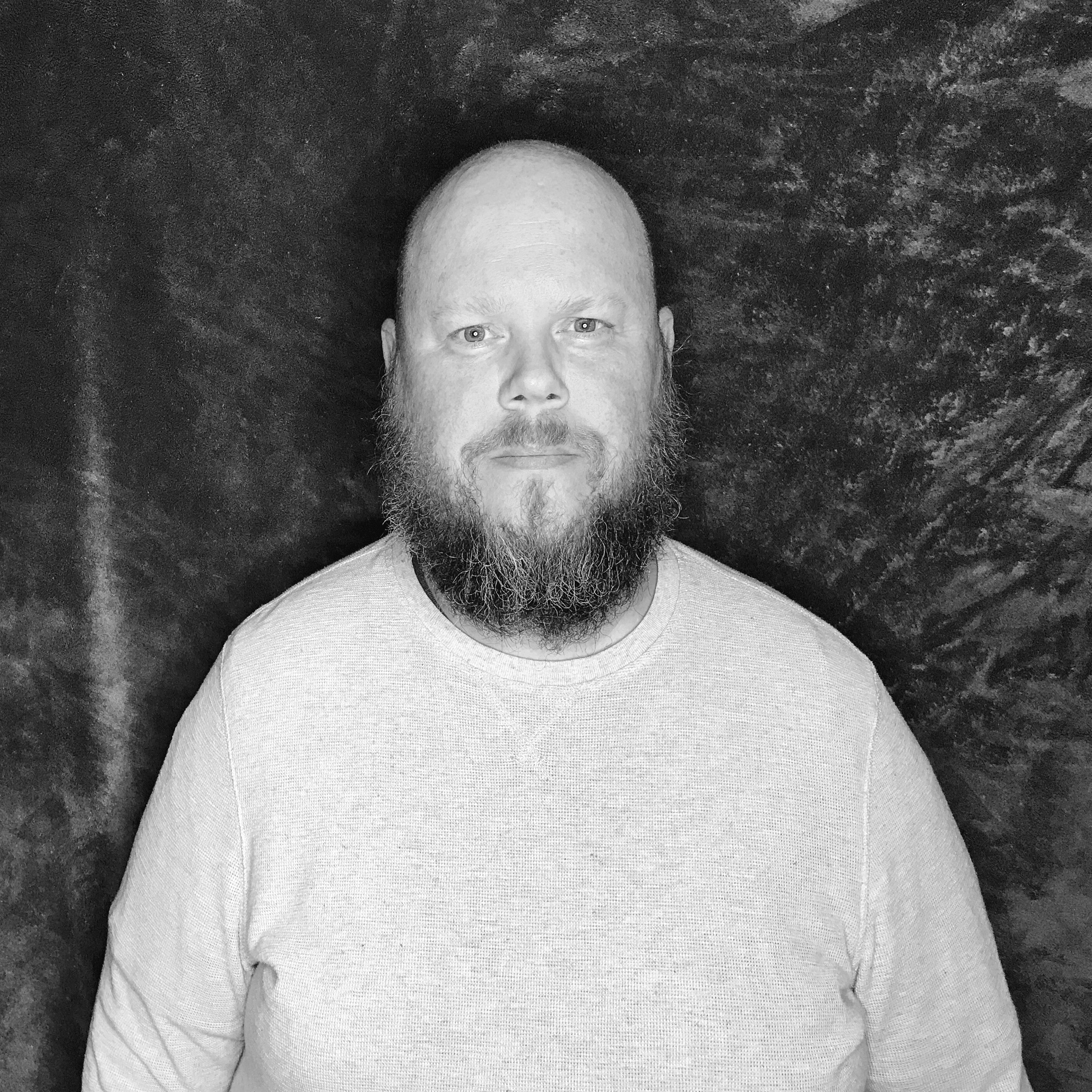
American singer-songwriter Aaron Sarlo

Aaron Sarlo is a singer-songwriter and comedian from Little Rock, Arkansas, United States.

== Life and career ==
Sarlo was born in Evanston, Illinois. He migrated to Little Rock, Arkansas at the age of eleven. In his early twenties, he founded the power-pop band, Techno Squid Eats Parliament, with Clay Bell, Mark Pearrow, and Shayne Gray. The band was signed to Ardent Records, toured North America, appeared on MTV and MTV Canada, and have been cited as an influence for many musicians. In 1995, Sarlo relocated to Boston, Massachusetts, forming the indie prog rock band, Slept, with Techno Squid's sound engineer, Chris Schuette. In 2009, Sarlo formed the indie rock band, Dangerous Idiots, with former Techno Squid drummer, Shayne Gray, and Paul Bowling (Trusty) on bass. Dangerous Idiots signed with London record label, Mostar Records, in 2011, and their debut album received positive reviews in the British blogosphere, as well as back in Arkansas.

In 2018, Sarlo formed the three-piece indie rock band, Kid City with bassist Matt Rakes and drummer Olivia Glusica. Kid City was a semifinalist in the annual Arkansas Times Musicians Showcase. In 2019, Sarlo released his first solo single, a country-comedy ballad titled "Penis Tsunami" on his label Legitimate Businessman Entertainment.

== Discography ==
- Phische [cassette] (1989)
- Techno-Squid Eats Parliament (1994)
- I Shot Your Boyfriend / Sometimes Things 7" [single - vinyl] (1994)
- Slept Ick Tank [cassette] (1996)
- Slept / The Doosies Split 7" [single - vinyl] (1997)
- Guy Trapped In A Situation (1998)
- Dangerous Idiots (2011)
- Laundry for the Apocalypse (2012)
- Frankenbastard (2013)
- All I Want For Christmas (Is Some More Damn Meth) [single] (2014)
- Duckstronaut: Tabanid Camisade (2015)
- We’re Back. What Did We Miss? (2015)
- Dangerous Idiots Live At The Legendary White Water Tavern [DVD] (2016)
- Dangerous Idiots 10th Anniversary Edition (2018)
- Penis Tsunami [single] (2019)
