= Remainder (film) =

2015 film by Omer Fast

- Theatrical release poster
- Directed by: Omer Fast
- Written by: Omer Fast
- Based on: Remainder by Tom McCarthy
- Produced by: Natasha Dack Ojumu; Malte Grunert
- Starring: Tom Sturridge; Cush Jumbo; Ed Speleers; Arsher Ali
- Cinematography: Lukas Strebel
- Edited by: Andrew Bird
- Music by: Schneider TM
- Production companies: The BFI; Tigerlily Films; Amusement Park Films; Soda Film + Art; Phi Films
- Distributed by: Soda Pictures
- Release dates: 10 October 2015 (BFI London); 24 June 2016 (United Kingdom)
- Running time: 103 minutes
- Countries: United Kingdom; Germany
- Language: English
- Box office: $44,898

Remainder is a 2015 British-German drama film written and directed by Omer Fast, based on the 2005 novel of the same name by Tom McCarthy. It stars Tom Sturridge, Cush Jumbo, Ed Speleers, and Arsher Ali. The film was screened in the Panorama section at the 66th Berlin International Film Festival. It received generally positive reviews from critics.

== Plot ==
Tom receives a settlement of €8.5 million after losing his memories in an accident. Outside, he asks for change. Later, at a party, Tom experiences a vision of a past memory. He remembers the exact smells, sounds, and sights he experienced when walking down the stairwell of a flat, including running into a child. Tom decides to use his money to replay this exact memory. He hires a compliant assistant named Naz. The workers he hires to build his memories describe him as a perfectionist.

Tom ends his relationship with close friends. He contracts a man named Christopher whom he had met at a local phone booth. Several days later, however, Christopher is tased and shot dead. Tom decides to play Christopher in a re-enactment of his death. He uses a real taser despite Naz's protests. Next, Tom decides to perform a mock bank robbery after witnessing the torture and killing of a suspect. He hires an ex-convict with experience in heists. The man tells Tom that robberies require lots of choreography and that his crew would usually rehearse before a heist. With this in mind, Tom decides to have his cast rob an actual bank without telling them beforehand.

Naz tells Tom that they will have to murder the cast after completing the heist. The real robbery goes awry when one of the cast members is accidentally killed. Tom shoots the rest of his crew. He notices that one of the witnesses is the same child from his first re-enactment. He runs into Catherine, a close friend he had argued with, and takes a suitcase from her that he thinks is his. Outside, Tom braces himself for the impact of the same accident shown at the beginning of the film.

== Cast ==
- Tom Sturridge as Tom
- Cush Jumbo as Catherine Sullivan
- Ed Speleers as Greg
- Arsher Ali as Naz
- Nicholas Farrell as Daubenay
- Jumayn Hunter as Christopher
- Shaun Prendergast as Dr. Merril
- Adrian Schiller as Dr. Trevellian

== Reception ==
On the review aggregator website Rotten Tomatoes, 91% of 23 critics' reviews are positive, with an average rating of 7.4/10.
