= Boris Torres =

Ecuadorean American visual artist

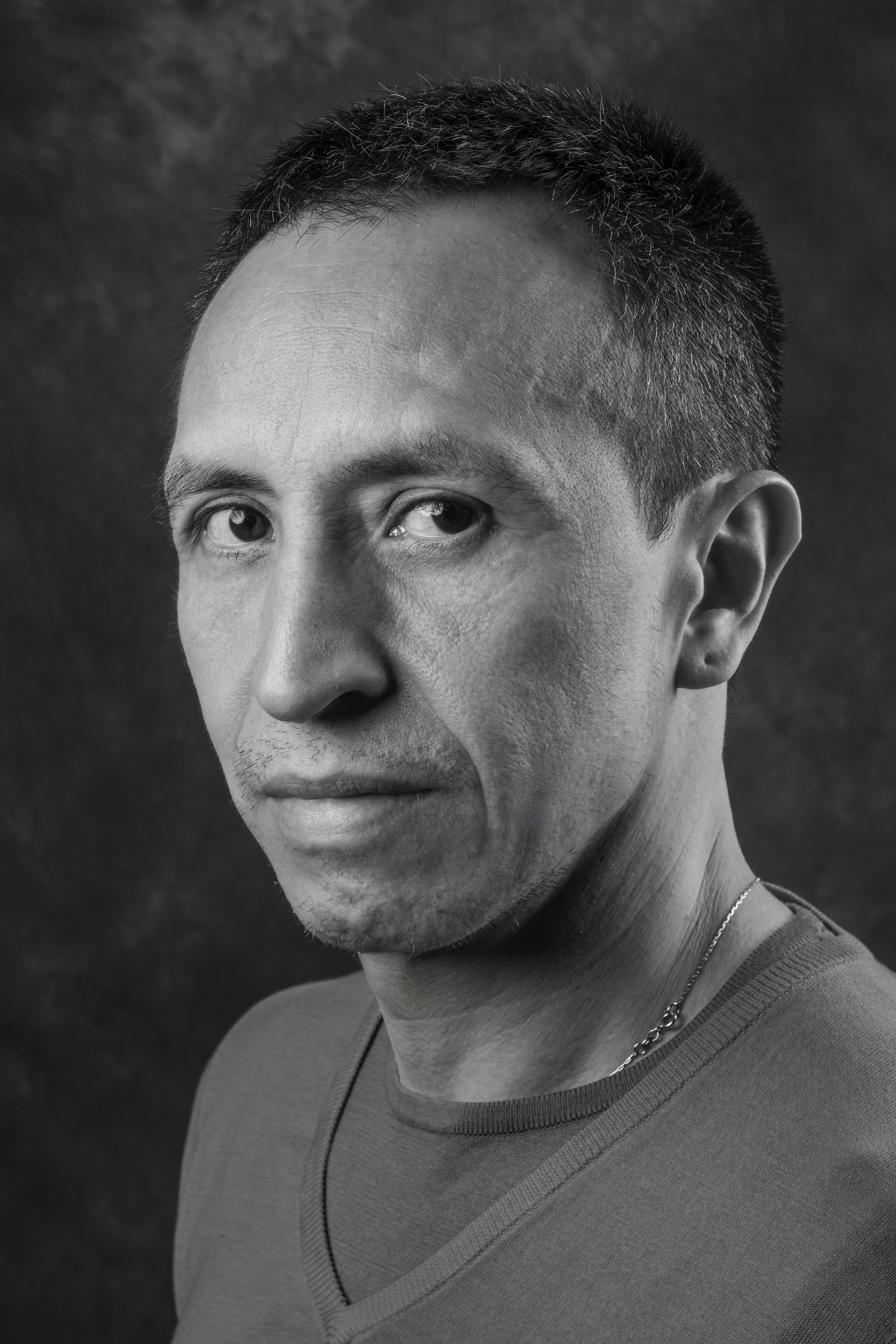
- Boris Torres in 2025
- Born: 1976 (age 49–50); Piñas, Ecuador
- Education: Parsons School of Design; Brooklyn College
- Known for: Painting, drawing, portraiture
- Spouse: Ira Sachs
- Children: 2

Boris Torres (born 1976) is an Ecuadorian-American visual artist based in New York City whose work explores sexuality, intimacy, desire, and queer identity through painting, drawing, and portraiture.

== Biography ==
Torres was born in Piñas, Ecuador, and immigrated to Brooklyn, New York, with his mother at age nine. Growing up in a working-class household with little exposure to art, he was encouraged by teachers who recognized his talent and attended Fiorello H. LaGuardia High School of the Performing Arts in New York City. He later earned a BFA from Parsons School of Design and an MFA in Fine Art from Brooklyn College.

== Work ==
Torres's work explores sexuality, intimacy, family, and queer identity through painting, drawing, and portraiture, often drawing on queer visual culture. His portrait practice developed from painting friends and acquaintances from life, which he has described as a way of recording time and shared experience through paint. Subjects have included artists, writers, performers, and activists drawn largely from New York City's creative and queer communities. Since 2018, Torres has also painted portraits of queer families, including his own, addressing a gap he has identified in the representation of contemporary queer parenthood in painting. His paintings are held in the permanent collection of the National Museum of Ecuador and are included in Art & Queer Culture, an academic survey by Catherine Lord and Richard Meyer covering 125 years of art related to sexual identity and culture. In 2017, his paintings were featured in Art AIDS America, a traveling group exhibition examining the AIDS crisis's impact on American art, shown at the Tacoma Art Museum, the Bronx Museum of Art, and Alphawood Gallery in Chicago. Torres also participated in Do You Think I'm Disco at Longwood Art Gallery in the Bronx.

== Personal life ==
Torres is married to filmmaker Ira Sachs. He is based in Manhattan and co-parents twins with married couple Kirsten Johnson, a filmmaker, and Tabitha Jackson. A mutual friend suggested that Johnson, Sachs, and Torres meet to discuss having children together; after several meetings, they decided to raise children together. Johnson and Jackson later married, and Jackson became a fourth parent to the twin children. The two families live in adjacent Manhattan apartments and split parenting time equally.

== Selected exhibitions ==
=== Solo exhibitions ===
- 2026 – Saturdays, Richard Koh Fine Art, Singapore
- 2026 – People I Know, Anne Reid '72 Gallery, Princeton University, Princeton, New Jersey
- 2025 – People Pleaser, Spark Art Fair, Vienna, Austria
- 2025 – Poems, Kates-Ferri Projects, New York
- 2023 – Carnival of Souls, Kates-Ferri Projects, New York
- 2018 – Drawings, Paintings and Collages, Bowman Gallery, Beverly Hills, California
- 2012 – Midnite, La Petite Mort Gallery, Ottawa, Canada

=== Group exhibitions ===
- 2026 – Eros Rising, Clamp, New York
- 2024 – Sharp Cuts: Queer Collage, Clamp, New York
- 2022 – Some People, Cheim & Read, New York
- 2021 – Dissolution, Leslie-Lohman Museum of Art, New York
- 2017 – Art AIDS America, Tacoma Art Museum, Tacoma, Washington; Bronx Museum of the Arts, New York; Alphawood Gallery, Chicago
- 2012 – Self-Consciousness, curated by Peter Doig and Hilton Als, Michael Werner Gallery, Berlin, Germany
- 2006 – Do You Think I'm Disco, Longwood Art Gallery, Bronx, New York
