= Keep the Lights On =

2012 American drama film

- Theatrical release poster
- Directed by: Ira Sachs
- Written by: Ira Sachs; Mauricio Zacharias
- Produced by: Marie Therese Guirgis; Lucas Joaquin; Ira Sachs
- Starring: Thure Lindhardt; Zachary Booth; Julianne Nicholson; Souleymane Sy Savane; Paprika Steen
- Cinematography: Thimios Bakatakis
- Edited by: Affonso Gonçalves
- Music by: Arthur Russell
- Production companies: Parts and Labor; Post Factory Films; Alarum Pictures; Film 50
- Distributed by: Music Box Films
- Release dates: January 20, 2012 (Sundance); September 7, 2012 (United States)
- Running time: 101 minutes
- Country: United States
- Languages: English; Danish

Keep the Lights On is a 2012 American drama film written by Ira Sachs and Mauricio Zacharias and directed by Sachs. It premiered at the 2012 Sundance Film Festival, and was released on September 7, 2012 by Music Box Films. The film stars Thure Lindhardt as Erik, a Danish filmmaker living in New York City to work on a documentary film about artist Avery Willard; while there, he enters into a loving but complicated long-term relationship with Paul (Zachary Booth), a lawyer in the publishing industry who struggles with drug addiction. The film's cast also includes Julianne Nicholson, Souléymane Sy Savané, Paprika Steen, David Anzuelo, Maria Dizzia, and Miguel Del Toro.

The film is based on Sachs' own past relationship with Bill Clegg, a literary agent who published his own memoir about his struggles with addiction, Portrait of an Addict as a Young Man, in 2010.

== Plot ==
In 1998, Danish artist Erik living in New York City meets Paul, a lawyer, through a phone sex hotline. Attracted to each other, they share an intimate moment and sex. Erik later visits a man named Russ who seems more interested in showing off his muscles to Erik than having sex. Erik sees Paul again and tells him about how he broke up with his ex-boyfriend Paolo, who was HIV-positive. Erik confides to his friend Claire on how he is happier with Paul than he was with Paolo.

Paul asks Erik to keep quiet about his drug use and gets Erik high. Paul, who has been closeted, sees his ex-girlfriend while visiting an art gallery with Erik. Paul avoids introducing Erik to his ex, by walking to a section of the gallery out of sight.

While away from the city, Erik calls his doctor and learns that he is HIV-negative. Later, Paul throws a surprise birthday party for him.

In 2000, Paul catches Erik talking to another man in the street. He confronts him and they argue but manage to get over it. Paul then briefly goes missing during a dinner with Erik and his friends and evades questions about where he was. Erik, temporarily away to work on a documentary, feels lonely and calls a phone sex hotline. He is startled when he is connected with Paul and becomes upset. Back in New York, Erik argues with Paul, but they make up again. Erik comes home to find an unconscious Paul outside their apartment. Paul is sent to rehab and states that Erik ruined his life. Erik goes to a gay club and meets a painter named Igor.

In 2003, with Paul's release from rehab and Erik's success with his film, Erik assumes everything will be better. The assumption is rocked when he learns that Paul left home while he was at work. While his sister comforts him, Erik gets a call from Paul who tells him to visit him at a hotel. Paul displays erratic behavior, trying to pretend he is okay while it is clear to Erik that he hasn't improved since rehab. Erik tries to convince Paul to return home, but he remains at the hotel and hires a male prostitute whom he has sex with while Erik watches. Erik goes to visit Russ, and the two share drugs and possibly sex.

In 2006, after not having seen each other for about a year, Paul meets Erik at a diner where both seem better than before. Erik invites Paul to spend the night at his apartment, to which Paul agrees while avoiding sex before going to sleep. Erik later runs into Igor and the two have a drink at a bar.

When spending time together in the countryside, Erik asks Paul how he feels about their relationship. Paul turns aggressive and gives Erik an ultimatum: Erik must decide whether they should move in together or break up. Erik ultimately says they should move in together. But later that night, he drives to Paul's apartment to tell him that he changed his mind. He walks Paul to work and admits that he still loves him, although Paul is skeptical. The two hug and Paul tells Erik to be well.

== Cast ==
- Thure Lindhardt as Erik Rothman
- Zachary Booth as Paul Lucy
- Julianne Nicholson as Claire
- Souleymane Sy Savane as Alassane
- Paprika Steen as Karen
- Miguel del Toro as Igor
- Sebastian La Cause as Russ
- David Anzuelo as Russ' Boyfriend
- Maria Dizzia as Vivian
- Justin Reinsilber as Dan
- Ed Vassallo as Tom

== Reception and awards ==
Keep the Lights On received acclaim from most movie critics. On the review aggregator website Rotten Tomatoes, 90% of 67 critics' reviews are positive, with an average rating of 7.6/10. The website's consensus reads: "Keep the Lights On is a mysterious, sexy journey deep into the love affair of two men that always manages to stay true to life." Metacritic.com gave the film a score of 79 out of 100 based on 26 critics.

The film won the 2012 Teddy Award for best feature. Thure Lindhardt was nominated for the Gotham Independent Film Award for Breakthrough Actor. The film was also nominated for four Independent Spirit Awards: Best Feature, Best Director, Best Actor, and Best Original Screenplay.
