= Anani Dzidzienyo =

Ghanaian researcher

- Born: December 22, 1941; Sekondi
- Died: October 25, 2020 (aged 78)
- Awards: 2020 Brazilian Studies Association’s Lifetime Contribution Award

Academic background
- Education: Williams College; University of Essex

Academic work
- Discipline: Afro-Brazilian studies
- Institutions: Brown University
- Notable works: The Position of Blacks in Brazilian Society (1971); African-Brazilian Relations: A Reconsideration (1981); Neither Enemies nor Friends: Latinos, Blacks, Afro-Latinos (2005)

Anani Dzidzienyo was a professor of Afro-Brazilian studies at Brown University. He is known for his scholarship on the African diaspora in Latin America.

== Early life and education ==
Born in Sekondi, Gold Coast in 1941, Dzidzienyo grew up as Ghana became independent. This political climate and the influence of Kwame Nkrumah caused Dzidzienyo to consider a career as a diplomat and to study international relations.

After winning a 1959 essay contest, Dzidzienyo traveled to the US in 1960 to represent Ghana at the New York Herald Tribune World Youth Forum. In 1965, he began attending Williams College, receiving a BA in political science. During one of his courses, a professor showed images from an Afro-Brazilian festival which bore similarities to Dzidzienyo experienced in Gold Coast, piquing his curiosity. He pursued graduate studies in Latin American politics and government at the University of Essex. After graduating, he became a research fellow at the Institute of Race Relations and started lecturing at Brown University.

== Career ==
In 1971, Dzidzienyo wrote "The Position of Blacks in Brazilian Society", an article which challenged the perspective the racial discrimination was no longer present in Latin America after the end of the colonial period and slavery. He was one of the first scholars to bring an African perspective to the study of anti-Black racism.

Dzidzienyo taught at Brown University for over 46 years and helped to revise its Baccalaureate ceremonies to include "prayers and blessings performed in native languages, as well as cultural traditions that represent the homes of members of the student body". He contributed to many books and encyclopedias. He studied the relationship between Brazil and Africa, the after-effects of slavery on Black Brazilians and racial dynamics both in Brazil and elsewhere. Concerned with policy, Dzidzienyo authored reports for human rights foundations.

== Awards and honours ==
- 2020 Brazilian Studies Association's Lifetime Contribution Award

== Personal life ==
Dzidzienyo died of cancer in October 2020. His extensive personal collection of research documents from his years at Brown was later sorted and archived by students. He formed "lasting personal relationships with his students" as a mentor, fostering generations of scholars in Afro-Brazilian studies and encouraging them to learn Portuguese.
