= Metronome (artists' and writers' organ) =

Curatorial and research-led platform founded in 1996 by Clémentine Deliss

Metronome was an artists' and writers' organ founded by Clémentine Deliss, which included Metronome magazine (1996–2007) and a set of paperback novels from Metronome Press (2005). Metronome was a non-profit organisation that acted as alternative art publishing, without a fixed editorial team or a fixed location. Artists, writers and curators collaborated to produce printed projects mixing art and fiction.

== Metronome magazine ==
As a critical alternative to conventional art publishing, Metronome generated new works by artists and writers with the intention of creating new circuits of art scenes in different locations. It created an international neighbourhood between artists and writers, stimulating a discussion on the art backstage that could not take place in the public space as an exhibition. For this reason, it was conceived as a creative tangent to an exhibition and an instrument for research.

Each magazine issue was the result of a research made in a number of different cities and locations of the world including Dakar, London, Berlin, Copenhagen, Oslo, Basel, Frankfurt, Vienna and others, with a new group of collaborators in each place. The last two issues were linked to "Future Academy", a research initiative that was active in the UK, Senegal, India, US, Australia and Japan.

=== Issues ===
==== Metronome No. 0 (Pilot Issue) – Dakar, 1996 ====
This was a pilot issue of Metronome printed in Senegal that set the production of all future issues.

It included interviews with Catherine David and Paul Virilio, visual and text-based conversations between Dakar and London.

Artists & Writers: Autograph; Joshua Compston; Catherine David; Clémentine Deliss; Joy Gregory; Elizabeth Harney; Laboratoire Agit'Art; Rut Blees Luxemburg; Issa Samb; Penny Siopis; Djibril Sy; El Sy; Paul Virilio.

==== Metronome No. 1 – London, 1997 ====
Artists & Writers: Bili Bidjocka; Guy Brett; Ery Camara; Andrew Cross; Clémentine Deliss; Tracey Emin; Carl Freedman; Tom Gidley; Edouard Glissant; Susan Hiller; Gary Hume; Jaki Irvine; Greg James; Atta Kwami; Langlands & Bell; Zoe Leonard; Rut Blees Luxemburg; Fred Mann; Cathy de Monchaux; Michelle Naismith; Alistair Raphael; Issa Samb; Djibril Sy; Mark Aerial Waller.

==== Metronome No. 2 – Berlin, 1997 ====
Published in August 1997, for documenta X.

Artists & Writers: Franz Ackermann; Gamal Al-Ghitani; Andrea & Philippe; May Ayim; Sabeth Buchmann; Matthew Collings; Clémentine Deliss; Nina Fischer & Maroan El Sani; Durs Grünbein; Abdoulaye Guissé; Judith Hopf; Rebecca Horn; Johannes Kahrs; Ulrike Kuschel; Via Lewandowsky; Mohamed Magani; Rémy Markowitsch; Jakob Mattner; Wairimu Mwangi Thamaini; Carsten Nicolai; Olaf Nicolai; Anatoli Shuravlev; Julian Stallabrass; Annelies Strba; Frank Thiel; Mamadou Touré dit Béhan; Gavin Turk; Emmett Williams; Slavoj Zizek.

==== Metronome No. 3 – Basel, 1998 ====
Tempolabor, A Libertine Laboratory?

Artists & Writers: Rasna Bhushan; Ursula Biemann; Peter Brandlmayr; Clémentine Deliss; Marianne Eigenheer; Charles Esche; Ewa Esterhazy; Jean-Paul Felley; Izeta Gradevic; Eric Hattan; Rummana Hussain; Olivier Kaeser; Birgit Kempker; Jörg Lenzlinger; Renée Levi; Via Lewandowsky; Heinrich Lüber; Muda Mathis; Claudia & Julia Müller; Marianne Müller; Tim Neuger; Olaf Nicolai; Peter Pakesch; Dan Peterman; Maria & Michelangelo Pistoletto; Stephan Prina; Martin Prinzhorn; Progetto Arte; Tobias Rehberger; Leila Sadeghee; Issa Samb; Nicolaus Schafhausen; Andrew Shields; Kan-Si; Martina Siegwolf; Gerda Steiner; Reinhard Storz; Peter Suter; Wawrzyniec Tokarski; Annette Ungar; Cyril Verrier; Nebojsa Vilic; Sus Zwick.

==== Metronome No. 4-5-6 – Edinburgh, Bordeaux, Frankfurt, Vienna, Biella, 1999 ====
Backwards Translation

Artists & Writers: Unai Goieaskoetxea Arronategi; Axford, Dale, Löwenstein & Young; Miriam Bajtala; Yassine Balbzioui; Thomas Baumann; Thomas Bayrle; Stefan Beck; Lutz Braun; Ernst Caramelle; Hsia-Fei Chang; Sunah Choi; Arnaud Dejeammes; Clémentine Deliss; Jean-Luc Desmond; P.K. Dick; John Douglas; Irene Düring; Steve Duval; Gardar Eide Einarsson; Ewa Einhorn; Charles Esche; Andreas Exner; Roman Fehr; Dirk Fleischmann; Parastou Forouhar; Sophie Fougy; Luca Frei; Hamish Fulton; Gerhard Geiger; Yann Géraud; Gerald Gerstenberger; Simon Girault; Marcus Graf & A.T. Kelemen; Tamara Grcic; Fritz Grohs; Steffi Hartel; Kathrin Höhne; Laura Horelli; Sergei Jensen; Alan Johnston; Anne Kaminsky; Kan-Si; Franz Kapfer; Phyllis Kiehl; Udo Koch; Peter Kogler; Kasper König; Timo Kopomaa; Suwan Laimanee; Elanit Leder; Marko Lehanka; Achim Lengerer; Kerstin Lichtblau; Karen Loughridge; Lyn Löwenstein; Fiona Macalister; Jan Machacek & Radostina Patulova; Pierre Molinier; Joshua Moon; Claudia & Julia Müller; Olaf Nicolai; Angelika Nollert; Christos Papoulias; Andrew Patrizio; Edith Payer; Manfred Peckl; Michael Pfrommer; Kiersten Pieroth; Lisa Pock; Stephan Potengowski; Alan Rankin; Anna Ray; Tobias Rehberger; Mandla Reuter; Michael S. Riedel; Tanja Ristovski; Monika Ruckstuhl; Nicole Schatt; Eva Schlegel; Christian C. Schweitzer; Thomas Seidemann; Anya Sheade; Constant Siméon-Reinhard; Sean Snyder; Andreas Spiegl; Wolfgang Stengel; Misha Stroj; Superflex; Markus Szikszay; Jean-Paul Thibeau; Armin B. Wagner; Mark Aerial Waller; Naomi West; Alexander Wolff; Ekrem Yalcindag; Haegue Yang.

==== Metronome No. 7 – Oslo, Copenhagen, Stockholm, Bergen, Malmö, 2001 ====
The Bastard

Designed by Liam Gillick

Artists & Writers: Norris Adoro; Kristoffer Akselbo; Guy Bar Amotz; Anonymous; Theodor Barth; Rikke Benborg; Johannes Bergmark; Bili Bidjocka; Greta Blok; Ina Blom; Karlotta Blöndal; Kaspar Bonnén; Liv Bugge; Maria Candéa; Benson Chiremba; Jacques Demarcq; Alexander García Düttmann; Ewa Einhorn; Annika Eriksson; Alma Erlich; Unn Fahlstrøm; Jo Torkjel Fenne; Luca Frei; William Furlong; Kendell Geers; Liam Gillick; Pierre Giquel; Raymond Hains; Lise Harlev; Molly Haslund; Gad Hollander; Saskia Holmkvist; Karl Holmqvist; Leif Holmstrand; Jun Iseyama; Frans Jacobi; Alan Johnston; Phyllis Kiehl; Björn Kjelltoft; Ferdinand Ahm Krag; Cees Krijnen; Pierre Leguillon; Oskar Lindvall; Håkon Liu; a Love Laboratory; Ingrid Luche; Bernard Marcadé; Bjarne Melgaard; Mary-Annick Morel; Simon Njami; Douglas Park; Rabia; Hans Hamid Rasmussen; Øyvind Renberg; Emil Røyrvik; Joanna Rytel; Thomas Saenger; Issa Samb; ManfreDu Schu; Åsa Sonjasdotter; Misha Stroj; Hiroshi Sunairi; Adam Szymczyk; Samon Takahashi; Jean-Paul Thibeau; Johan Tirén; Linn Cecilie Ulvin; Salomé Voegelin; Haegue Yang.

==== Metronome No. 8A-8B – London, 2002 ====
The Stunt & The Queel

Artists & Writers: Michael Archer; Dave Beech; Colin Cina; Neil Cummings; R. Nick Evans; Anna Fasshauer; Rose Finn-Kelcey; Ben Fitton; Kendell Geers; Babak Ghazi; Liam Gillick; Felicity Greenland; Alan Johnston; Annis Joslin; Stephen Klee; Langlands & Bell; John Latham; Rut Blees Luxemburg; Douglas Park; Barbara Steveni; Gavin Turk; Hans Weigand; Cerith Wyn Evans.

==== Metronome No. 9 – Paris, 2005 ====
Le Teaser & Le Joker

Artists & Writers: John Akomfrah & Edward George, Marc Atlas, Olivier Babin, Paul Baruch, Diamantis, Ewa Einhorn, Charles Henri Ford & Parker Tyler, Craig Garrett, Tom Gidley, Claire Guezengar, Judith Ickowicz, Phyllis Kiehl, Lefevre Jean Claude, Susannah Mabitt, Rev. Boyd MacDonald, Tom McCarthy, Bill Moan, Douglas Park, Abo Rasul, Nancy Strasbourg, Samon Takahashi, Boris Tiago, Oscar Tuazon, Bella Woodfield.

==== Metronome No. 10 – Oregon, 2006 ====
Future Academy. Shared, Mobile, Improvised, Underground, Hidden, Floating

Special edition for documenta 12

Artists & Writers: Ibon Aranberri, Nico Dockx, Didier Fiuza Faustino, Richard Fischbeck, Yona Friedman, Jan Mast, Christos Papoulias, Douglas Park, Michelangelo Pistoletto, Matthew Stadler, and members of Future Academy in Edinburgh, Bangalore, and Dakar.

==== Metronome No. 11 – Tokyo, 2007 ====
What is to be done?

Artists & Writers: Future Academy; Arts Initiative Tokyo; co-lab; Magnus Bärtås; Thomas Boutoux; Nico Dockx; Hu Fan; Boris Gobille; Yuko Hasegawa; Alan Johnston; Mami Kataoka; Roger McDonald; Masato Nakamura; Fumio Nanjo; Aomi Okabe; Tetsuya Ozaki; Yuko Ozawa; Christos Papoulias; Johannes Raether; Georg Schöllhammer; Stephanie Snyder; Matthew Stadler; Oscar Tuazon; Masahiro Wada; Takayuki Yamamoto and many others.

== Metronome Press ==
Metronome Press was a not-for-profit collective run by Clémentine Deliss and Thomas Boutoux in Paris during 2005–2007. It was founded as an extension of Metronome No. 9, based on the international history of avant-garde publishing in Paris and its productive intersection between art and literature.

It started from the intuition of Maurice Girodias, the founder of Olympia Press, to highlight the cultural internationalism of Paris and turn it into a centre for global arts distribution. For this reason, all the books were published in English.

Metronome Press published four novels in the shape of a paperback series, three by living visual artists and one reprint from 1933.

The paperback series (2005):

- Fat Mountain Scenes by Phyllis Kiehl
- Stunning Lofts by Tom Gidley
- Remainder by Tom McCarthy
- The Young and Evil [1933] by Charles Henri Ford and Parker Tyler
