= Tom McCarthy (novelist) =

English writer and artist (born 1969)

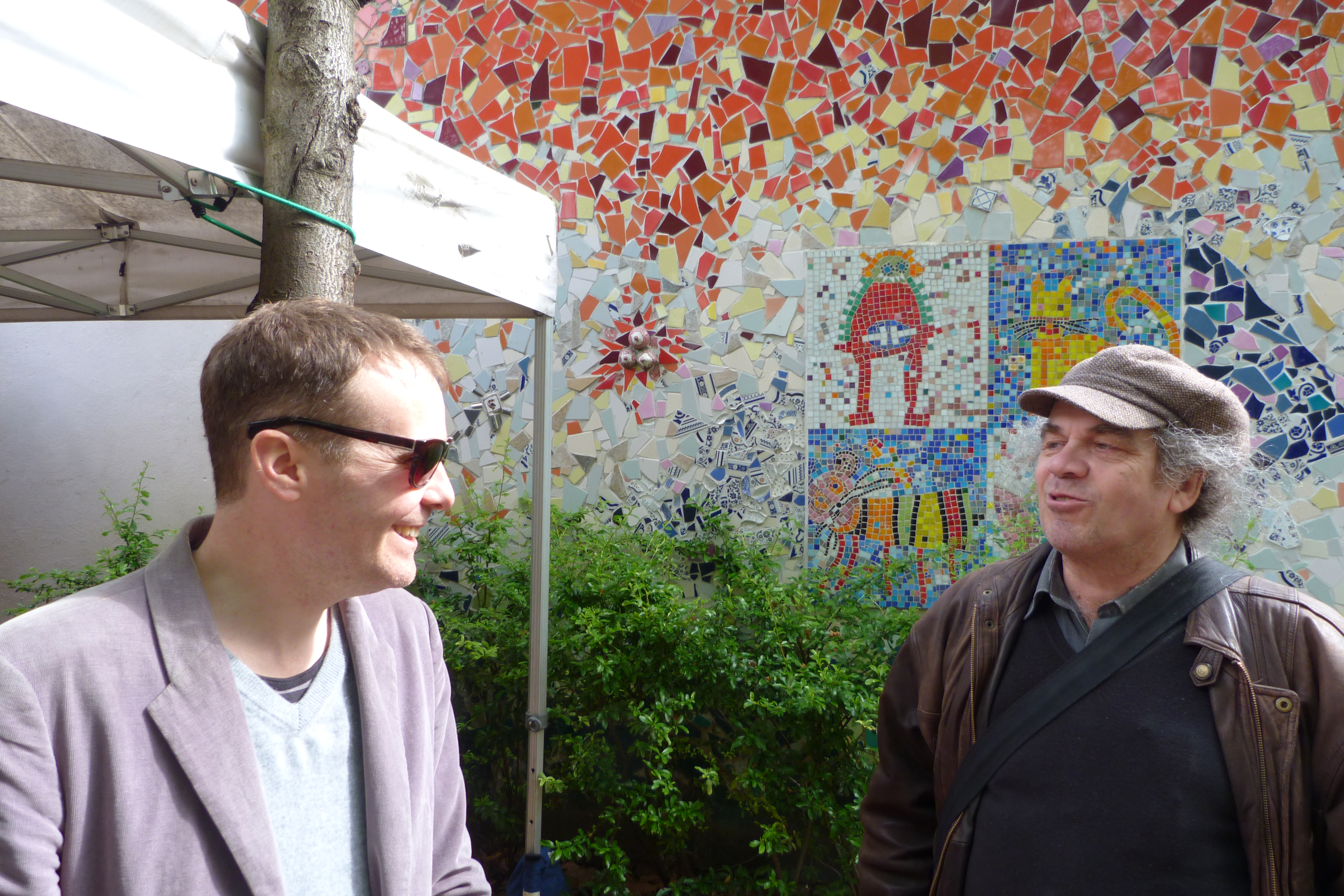
- McCarthy (left) with Fabian Tompsett, 2014
- Born: 1969 (age 56–57); London, England
- Occupations: Novelist; writer; artist
- Writing career
- Period: 2001–present
- Notable works: Remainder; C; Satin Island
- Website: vargas.org.uk/publications/ins/index.html

Tom McCarthy (born May 22, 1969) is an English writer and artist. In the wake of Brexit, he gained Swedish citizenship. His debut novel, Remainder, was published in 2005. McCarthy has twice been shortlisted for the Man Booker Prize and was awarded the inaugural Windham-Campbell Literature Prize by Yale University in 2013. He won a Believer Book Award for Remainder in 2008.

He has also written a critical study of Tintin called Tintin and the Secret of Literature, and published an essay collection, Typewriters, Bombs, and Jellyfish, in 2017. His most recent novel, The Making of Incarnation, was published in 2021.

== Life and work ==
Tom McCarthy was born in London in 1969 and lives in Berlin. His father, Sir Callum McCarthy, worked in the financial sector. He was a civil servant, first in the Department of Trade and Industry, and then (his last decade of work) as a financial regulator. Tom McCarthy grew up in Greenwich, and was educated at Dulwich College from 1978 to 1986 and later New College, Oxford, where he studied English literature. He lived in Prague, where he worked as a nude model and in an American bar; Berlin, where he worked in an Irish pub; and Amsterdam, where he worked in a restaurant kitchen and reviewed books for the local edition of Time Out magazine in the early 90s, before moving back to London. McCarthy's time in Prague forms the basis for his novel Men in Space. McCarthy has also worked as a television script editor, and co-edited Mute magazine. Since 2022, McCarthy held the post of Miller Scholar at the Santa Fe Institute, alongside Ted Chiang and Andrea Wulf. Prior to moving to Berlin, he lived and wrote in a tower block flat on the Golden Lane Estate beside the Barbican.

=== Writing and publishing ===
McCarthy's debut novel Remainder was written in 2001 and rejected by all the UK publishers to which it was submitted. It was published in November 2005 by the small Paris-based art publisher Metronome Press and distributed through gallery and museum shops, but not in chain bookstores and then received widespread critical attention in the literary and mainstream press, with one of its first reviews, in December 2005, on ReadySteadyBook who called it "one of the most important novels written in a long, long time." The London Review of Books called it "a very good novel indeed" and The Independent claimed that "its minatory brilliance calls for classic status". The novel was re-published by the independent publisher Alma Books in the UK (2006), and the Bertelsmann subsidiary Vintage in the US (2007), where it ranked as an Amazon top one-hundred seller and entered the Los Angeles Times Bestseller list. On its American publication the New York Times dedicated the front cover of its book section to the novel, calling the book "a work of novelistic philosophy, as disturbing as it is funny". In 2008 Remainder won the fourth annual Believer Book Award. Zadie Smith wrote in the New York Review of Books that it was "one of the great English novels of the last ten years", suggesting it showed a future path that the novel "might, with difficulty, follow". It has since been translated into fourteen languages, and a film adaptation directed by Omer Fast was released in 2015. Several big publishing houses who had rejected the novel returned to him with enthusiastic offers, which McCarthy rejected, commenting that "it's the same book as it was two years ago."

A work of literary criticism by McCarthy, Tintin and the Secret of Literature, was released by Granta Books in June 2006, with French (Hachette Littératures), Spanish (El Tercer Nombre), Italian (Piemme) and American editions (Counterpoint) following in 2007-8. The book attempted a reading of Hergé's The Adventures of Tintin books through the prism of structuralist and post-structuralist literary theory. It divided reviewers, with some critics disliking the book's references to Jacques Derrida and Roland Barthes. Killian Fox in The Observer praised "its author's obsessive approach, his breathtaking grasp of the oeuvre and the sheer exuberance with which he tackles his subject". However, in The Guardian, Kathryn Hughes criticised its methodology and style: "McCarthy's text has that pleased-with-itself smirk that was so characteristic of the early 90s, when journalists started purloining critical theory from the academy, liking the way it made them feel clever". McCarthy commented: "Granta asked if I wanted to write a book on Freud or Derrida or someone like that, and I said: 'Well, if I write about Hergé I can write about Freud, Derrida and whole bunch of other people, plus it'll be much more fun.' It was received well for the most part. There were one or two hilarious English reviews in which you could virtually see the reviewer's veins bursting with little-England rage at the book's continental bent."

In 2007, Alma Books published his second novel, Men in Space, much of which was written prior to Remainder. It has since been published in many languages including Greek and French. McCarthy has also published numerous stories, essays and articles on literature, philosophy and art in publications including The Observer, The Times Literary Supplement, London Review of Books, Artforum, and The New York Times., as well as in anthologies such as London from Punk to Blair (Reaktion Books), Theology and the Political (Duke University Press), The Milgram Reenactment (Jan van Eyck Press) and The Empty Page: Fiction Inspired by Sonic Youth (Serpent's Tail).

In 2004 he published an essay on excrement in the work of James Joyce in the online literary journal Hypermedia Joyce Studies. In 2008 an essay by McCarthy on Alain Robbe-Grillet, an author he has often expressed admiration for, was published in the new Oneworld Classics English edition of Robbe-Grillet's Jealousy. In February 2015 McCarthy published a new novel titled Satin Island which was shortlisted for that year's Man Booker Prize; when he began it, he said, "It's going to have a leitmotif of a parachutist falling to earth, having realised that his parachute has been sabotaged: his relation to the landscape, death, technology."

McCarthy’s fifth novel, The Making of Incarnation, appeared in 2023 and was described as ‘implacable and intermittently tedious’ by Steven Poole in The Guardian.

=== Art ===
Since 1999 McCarthy has been 'general secretary' of a 'semi-fictitious organisation' he co-founded with his friend the philosopher Simon Critchley called the International Necronautical Society (INS) "devoted to mind-bending projects that would do for death what the Surrealists had done for sex". Having failed to interest publishers in his novels in 2001-2, he made art projects under the INS name. McCarthy handed out his International Necronautical Society or INS manifestos at a mock art fair organised by artist Gavin Turk. The INS operates through publications, live events, media interventions and more conventional art exhibitions.

In a 2007 interview with the website Bookninja, McCarthy explained the circumstances that led to the formation of the INS: "I was quite well integrated into the art world in London by the late nineties, and on top of that I'd for some time had an interest in the modes and procedures of early twentieth-century avant-gardes like the Futurists and Surrealists: their semi-corporate, semi-political structures of committees and subcommittees, their use of manifestos, proclamations and denunciations".

Despite his initial claim that the INS was "not an art project", McCarthy has accepted invitations to show work in his capacity as INS general secretary at art institutions around the world, including Tate Britain and the Institute of Contemporary Arts in London, Moderna Museet (Stockholm), the Drawing Center (New York), KW Institute Berlin, Hartware MedienKunstVerein Dortmund, and Substation Gallery Singapore.

The INS has been described by Art Monthly as "a group of wayward literati and sweet-talking parodists", and as "obscure" by The Australian. In 2003 the INS hacked the BBC website and inserted propaganda into its source code. The following year, they set up a broadcasting unit at the Institute of Contemporary Arts from which more than forty assistants generated non-stop "poem-codes" which were transmitted over FM radio in London and by internet to collaborating radio stations around the world. In 2008 a more mechanical version of this piece was displayed at Stockholm's Moderna Museet, in which an aeroplane Black Box transmitter sent out a stream of similar messages.

In 2007, after McCarthy and INS Chief Philosopher Simon Critchley had delivered the "INS Declaration on Inauthenticity" at New York's Drawing Center, the critic Peter Schwenger alleged in Triple Canopy that the two men who appeared in the gallery were not in fact Critchley and McCarthy. Taking his claim as an inspiration, McCarthy and Critchley did indeed replace themselves with actors when delivering the Declaration one year later at Tate Britain. When invited to deliver the Declaration a third time at the 2009 Athens Biennial, they announced that the Declaration would henceforth be outsourced to any institution who wanted it, and commissioned a Greek translation, which was subsequently delivered by Greek actors in Athens.

McCarthy has made independent artworks. In 2005 he exhibited, at The Western Front Gallery, Vancouver, the multimedia installation piece 'Greenwich Degree Zero', produced in collaboration with artist Rod Dickinson, which (in a tribute to Joseph Conrad's 1907 novel The Secret Agent), depicted the Greenwich Observatory burning the ground. The piece was subsequently purchased by the Arts Council England's permanent collection.

In 2006 he collaborated with French artist Loris Gréaud to produce an 'Ontic Helpline' for a fictitious 'Thanatalogical Corporation' – a black telephone that transfers callers through an endless loop of pre-recorded messages. The telephone was displayed in the FiAC collection in Paris, and purchased by gallerists/collectors Solene Guillier and Nathalie Boutin. McCarthy wrote the script for Johan Grimonprez's feature film Double Take (2009). The script consists of a short story, loosely based on Borges's '25 August 1983', in which Hitchcock meets his double on the set of one of his films. The film won the Black Pearl award (MEIFF, Abu Dhabi) in 2009. McCarthy has also tutored and lectured at various institutions including the Architectural Association, Central Saint Martins School of Art, the Royal College of Art, London Consortium and Columbia University.

== Novels ==
=== Remainder ===
The first novel, Remainder (2005), tells the story of an unnamed hero traumatised by an accident which "involved something falling from the sky". Eight and a half million pounds richer due to a compensation settlement but hopelessly estranged from the world around him, Remainder's protagonist spends his time and money obsessively reconstructing and re-enacting vaguely remembered scenes and situations from his past, such as a large building with piano music in the distance, the familiar smells and sounds of liver frying and spluttering, or lethargic cats lounging on roofs until they tumble off them. These re-enactments are driven by a need to inhabit the world "authentically" rather than in the "second-hand" manner that his traumatic situation has bequeathed him. When the recreation of mundane events fails to quench this thirst for authenticity, he starts re-enacting more and more violent events.

=== Men in Space ===
Set in a Central Europe rapidly fragmenting after the fall of Communism, Men in Space follows a cast of dissolute Bohemians, political refugees, football referees, deaf police agents, assassins and stranded astronauts as they chase a stolen icon painting from Sofia to Prague and beyond. The icon's melancholy orbit is reflected in the various characters' ellipses and near-misses as they career vertiginously through all kinds of space, be it physical, political, emotional or metaphysical. McCarthy uses these settings to present a vision of humanity adrift in history, and a world in a state of disintegration.

Stephen J. Burn sees Men in Space, David Mitchell's number9dream and Andrew Crumey's Pfitz as examples of a subgenre Burn calls "multiple drafts" novels, taking its name from Daniel Dennett's model of consciousness.

=== C ===
Opening in England at the turn of the twentieth century, C is the story of a boy named Serge Carrefax, whose father spends his time experimenting with wireless communication while running a school for deaf children. Serge grows up amid the noise and silence with his brilliant but troubled older sister, Sophie: an intense sibling relationship that stays with him as he heads off into an equally troubled larger world. After a fling with a nurse at a Bohemian spa, Serge serves in World War I as a radio operator for reconnaissance planes. When his plane is shot down, Serge is taken to a German prison camp, from which he escapes. Back in London, he's recruited for a mission to Cairo on behalf of the shadowy Empire Wireless Chain.

McCarthy's novel C was released in late 2010, in the US with Knopf, and in the UK with Jonathan Cape. It divided critics. McCarthy has described this novel in previous interviews as dealing with technology and mourning. The book was shortlisted for the 2010 Man Booker Prize. In response Tom LeClair described him as a "young and British Thomas Pynchon." It was also shortlisted for the Walter Scott Prize.

It has been described as "unquestionably brilliant, usefully denting the model of the psychological realism that is the dominant mode of our conservative times by its unique, disorientating glance at modernism" by Neel Mukherjee of The Times and "an avant-garde epic, the first I can think of since Joyce's Ulysses" by Jonathan Dee of Harper's Magazine.

Leo Robson in the New Statesman review describes the book as "full of familiar delights and familiar tedium", with "Protracted descriptions of a pageant and a seance [that] drain the reader's will to live." It continues "After a certain point, most sentences go something like this (not a parody): "Everything seems connected: disparate locations twitch and burst into activity like limbs reacting to impulses sent from elsewhere in the body, booms and jibs obeying levers at the far end of a complex set of ropes and cogs and relays.""

=== Satin Island ===
Satin Island concerns a protagonist, "U.", who works for "the Company" as an anthropologist. The novel was published in 2015 and was shortlisted for the Man Booker Prize and the Goldsmiths Prize.

=== The Making of Incarnation ===
The Making of Incarnation involves a search for a fictional missing item—Box 808—from the archive of Lillian Gilbreth. The novel was published in 2021.

== Literary themes ==
In a 2007 interview, McCarthy claimed one of the main themes pervading his work to be that of repetition and duplication. The repetition in Remainder takes the form of re-enactments of events carried out by the wealthy post-traumatic hero in a process that some critics (such as Joyce Carol Oates in The New York Review of Books) have seen as allegory for art itself. In Men in Space it takes the form of duplication of an artwork, and a set of patterns repeating over several centuries. In McCarthy's art projects it has taken the form of repeating sets of messages over radio in a homage to Jean Cocteau's Orphée. Boyd Tonkin, in his Independent profile on McCarthy, picks up on the notion that literature itself is a series of repetitions and duplications.

At least one critic has connected McCarthy's work to "failed transcendence", and McCarthy has used the term failed transcendence in interviews to describe the collapse of the idealist project in philosophy, art and literature. Failed transcendence forms a central tenet of 'The New York Declaration on Inauthenticity', an INS talk delivered in the style of a propaganda statement by McCarthy and the philosopher Simon Critchley in 2007 in the Drawing Center, New York. In a discussion with the artist Margarita Gluzberg, held in 2001 in London's Austrian Cultural Forum, McCarthy cites Georges Bataille's description of matter as "that non-logical difference that represents in relation to the economy of the universe what crime represents in relation to the economy of the law".

In a lecture delivered to the International James Joyce Symposium in 2004 in Dublin, McCarthy again cites Bataille, drawing on his notion of "base materialism" to throw light on the scatological sensibility displayed in Joyce's novels. The detective in Men in Space is a radio surveillance operative who starts out boasting he "can always get a strong signal", but ends up losing the signal and then becoming deaf, cut off from all communication. In one interview, McCarthy discussed this character's similarity to Francis Ford Coppola's Harry Caul in The Conversation (1974).

McCarthy created an art project around Cocteau's Orphée, at the Institute of Contemporary Arts in London in 2004, which consisted of forty assistants cutting up text, projecting it onto the walls and then re-assembling it into cryptic messages which were transmitted around London and the world by radio and internet. This project was indebted to William S. Burroughs's notions of viral media and to Nicolas Abraham and Mária Török's notions of the "crypt", a space both of burial and encryption. The art-piece Black Box, originally displayed in Moderna Museet, Stockholm, in 2008, also involved constant radio transmissions. McCarthy has insisted that radio technology can be regarded as a metaphor for writing, comparing T. S. Eliot's The Waste Land to a radio programme.

== Awards and honours ==
- 2008 Believer Book Award for Remainder.
- 2010 Man Booker Prize (shortlist)
- 2013 Windham–Campbell Literature Prize for Fiction
- 2015 Man Booker Prize (shortlist)

== Bibliography ==
=== Experimental fiction ===
- —— (2002). Navigation Was Always a Difficult Art. London: Vargas Organization. ISBN 9780952027454.
- —— (2003). Calling All Agents. London: Vargas Organization. ISBN 9780952027485.

=== Novels ===
- —— (2005). Remainder. Paris: Metronome Press. ISBN 9782916262000.
- —— (2007). Men in Space. London: Alma Books. ISBN 9781846880339.
- —— (2010). C. London: Vintage. ISBN 9780224090209.
- —— (2015). Satin Island. New York: Knopf. ISBN 9780307593955.
- —— (2021). The Making of Incarnation. New York: Knopf. ISBN 9780593319871.
- —— (2026). The Rhyl Poster. New York: Penguin. ISBN 978-1529984576.

=== Non-fiction ===
- —— (2006). Tintin and the Secret of Literature. Granta Books. ISBN 9781862078314.
- —— (2012). Transmission and the Individual Remix. Vintage. ISBN 9780345803276.
- —— (10 October 2016). "Model Behavior". Work for Hire. The New Yorker. Vol. 92, no. 32. p. 72.
- —— (2017). Typewriters, Bombs, Jellyfish: Essays. New York Review Books. ISBN 9781681370866.
- —— (2019). The Death of the Artist. Cabinet Books. ISBN 9781932698893.^{α}

== Notes ==
^α Written with:
- Sam Durant
- Omer Fast
- Till Gathmann
- Susan Ploetz
- Eva Stenram
