= Ira Sachs =

American filmmaker (born 1965)

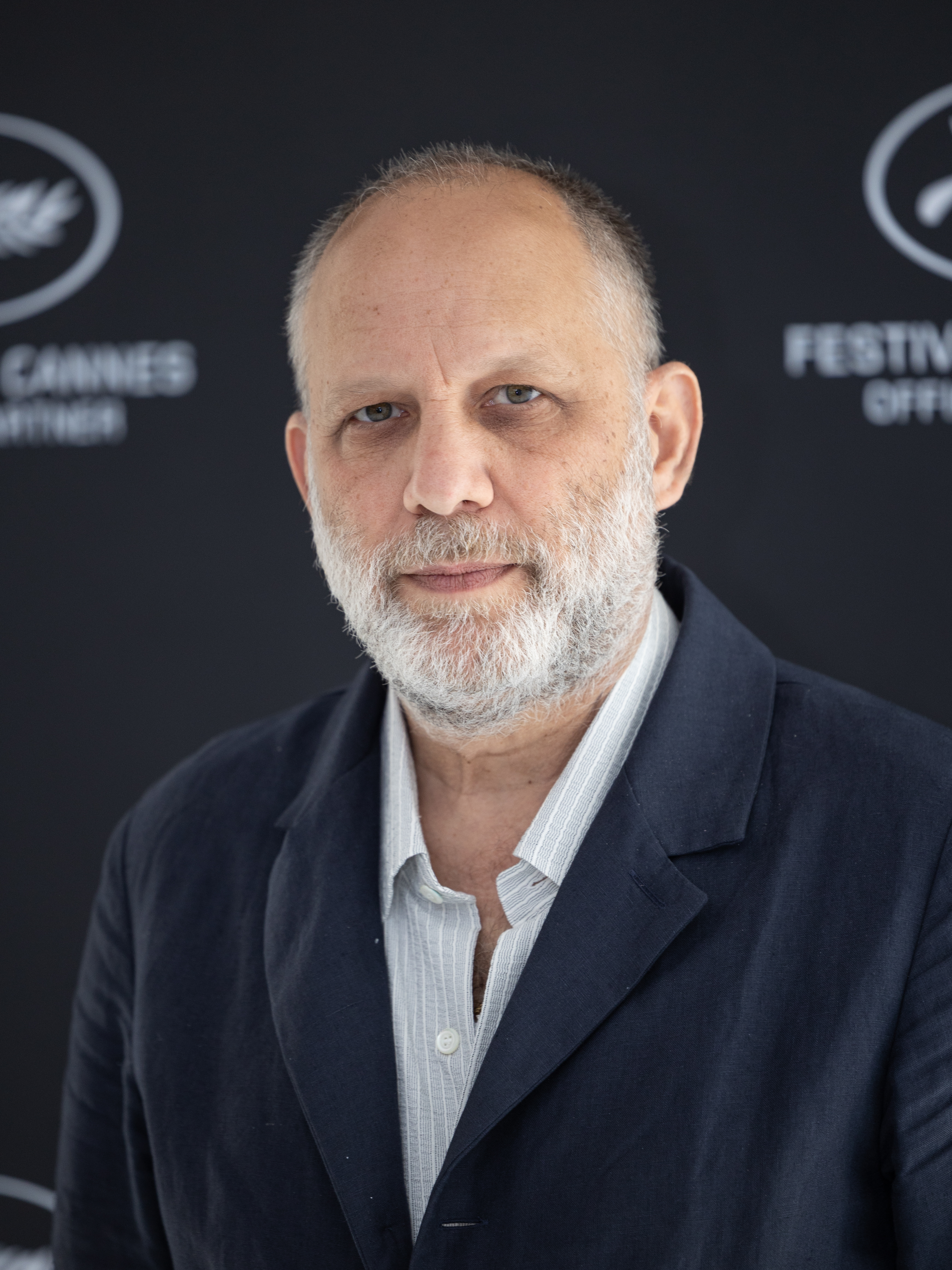
- Sachs at the 2026 Cannes Film Festival
- Born: November 21, 1965 (age 60); Memphis, Tennessee, United States
- Occupation: Filmmaker
- Known for: Full list
- Spouse: Boris Torres (m. 2012)
- Children: 2

Ira Sachs (born November 21, 1965) is an American filmmaker. Sachs started his career directing short films such as Vaudeville (1991) and Lady (1993) before making his feature film debut with The Delta (1996). Sachs later won acclaim for his dramatic independent films Forty Shades of Blue (2005), Keep the Lights On (2012), Love Is Strange (2014), Little Men (2016), and Passages (2023).

== Early life ==
Sachs was born in Memphis, Tennessee. His father grew up in Park City, Utah. Sachs frequently attended the Sundance Film Festival when it was titled, The U.S. Film Festival in the 1980s. In 1986 he spent a few months in Paris as a student. Sachs attended Yale University and graduated in 1988 with a degree in literature, with a focus in film studies and film theory. Sachs said he applied to film school at University of Southern California, UCLA and NYU who all rejected him. He moved to New York City in 1988.

Sachs stated, "The first thing I did in 1989 when I came to New York was worked as an assistant on a film called Longtime Companion by the director Norman René, which was about a group of New Yorkers who were confronted with, and confronting, living and dying through the AIDS crisis and it was a very seminal experience, I met a lot of filmmakers who were in the art department or assistants on that film. Kelly Reichardt and I became friends through that film, she was in the art department and I was in the...actually, I quit the art department and got a job as the assistant to the director, which Kelly Reichardt never let me forget."

== Career ==
=== 1991–2013 ===
Sachs started his career writing and directing short films including Vaudeville (1992) and Lady (1993). Vaudeville was shot in 16 mm with a runtime of 55 minutes. The story revolves around a traveling theatrical troupe of primarily gay and lesbian performers that mirrors the troubles of a political and social community through its tight-knit existence. Lady was 28 minutes long and was also shot in 16 mm. It concerns blurred parameters of sexuality, desire, and female identity.

He made his directorial film debut with the LGBTQ coming of age drama film The Delta (1996) about a young man exploring his bisexuality. Sachs spoke to his inspiration of the film saying, "I wrote the film in New York where I was living, but I grew up in Memphis. It was inspired by my memories and my thoughts and my knowledge of the city." The low budget film was shot on 16 mm. It premiered at the Sundance Film Festival and later screened at the Toronto International Film Festival to positive reviews.

His next film was Forty Shades of Blue (2005), which depicts a young Russian woman living in Memphis with an aging music producer, who comes to question her life when his adult son comes to visit. It was influenced by the films of Ken Loach and Satyajit Ray. The film won the Sundance Film Festival's Grand Jury Prize. He followed up with the period drama film Married Life (2007) based on John Bingham's 1953 novel Five Roundabouts to Heaven. It starred Chris Cooper, Patricia Clarkson, Pierce Brosnan, and Rachel McAdams, and received mixed reviews. He next directed the drama Keep the Lights On (2012) which premiered at the 2012 Sundance Film Festival. The film is based on Sachs' own past relationship with Bill Clegg, a literary agent who wrote a memoir, Portrait of an Addict as a Young Man (2010), about his struggles with addiction. David Rooney described the film as an "immersive portrait of contemporary New York life". The film was nominated for four Independent Spirit Awards including for Best Feature, Best Director, and Best Screenplay.

=== 2014–present ===
He returned to film with the relationship drama Love Is Strange (2014) starring John Lithgow, Alfred Molina and Marisa Tomei. The film screened at both the 2014 Sundance Film Festival and the 64th Berlin International Film Festival. Mark Kermode of The Guardian praised the film writing, "Watching this quietly beguiling tale of an ageing gay couple who have been together for decades, I was reminded of the films of Yasujirô Ozu, Woody Allen and Maurice Pialat."

"Sachs has in the past been the poet of middle-aged people's feelings. Now he has gone down a generation, almost into Eric Rohmer territory, into the world of younger people who have much less experience of disappointment and compromise. Or perhaps, in this world of cosmopolitan sophistication, it is Woody Allen territory or Nora Ephron territory"

— Peter Bradshaw, The Guardian

In 2016, Sachs directed the drama Little Men (2016) starring Jennifer Ehle and Greg Kinnear. The film premiered at the 66th Berlin International Film Festival. Peter Debruge of Variety gave the film a positive review writing, "Though Sachs' observations do succeed in personalizing the phenomenon, the reason we go — indeed, the reason we care — is because Little Men is also a story about love, and as Sachs has poignantly noted before, love is strange." Sachs received a nomination for the Independent Spirit Award for Best Screenplay for his work.

With 2019 drama film Frankie, Sachs cast Isabelle Huppert, Brendan Gleeson and reunited with Greg Kinnear and Marisa Tomei. Huppert plays an elderly French actress who is in ill health and decides to spend her last vacation with her family. The film premiered at 2019 Cannes Film Festival. In his mixed review, film critic Owen Gleiberman of Variety compared it to the works of Eric Rohmer writing, "Frankie is a film made with immaculate craftsmanship...Yet for all its naturalistic elegance and lighter-than-air precision, it's an American Rohmer film that doesn't, unfortunately, feel close to being a major Rohmer film."

His next film, Passages, was shot in France and released in 2023. It starred Franz Rogowski, Ben Whishaw, and Adèle Exarchopoulos. It depicts a long-time male couple, one of whom has an affair with a woman. Peter Bradshaw of The Guardian praised Sachs film calling it a return to form. Bradshaw compared the film to the works of Eric Rohmer, Woody Allen and Nora Ephron and declared, "Sachs strikes gold with sophisticated love triangle". The film received controversy due to the Motion Picture Association giving it an NC-17 rating, prompting its American distributor to release the film unrated. Sachs called the rating "A form of cultural censorship that is quite dangerous, particularly in a culture which is already battling, in such extreme ways, the possibility of LGBT imagery to exist".

In 2025, he directed Peter Hujar's Day, starring Ben Whishaw as photographer Peter Hujar and Rebecca Hall as writer Linda Rosenkrantz. Set entirely in Rosenkrantz's New York apartment, the film reenacts a taped 1974 conversation in which Hujar recounts the previous day in detail, touching on encounters with figures like Allen Ginsberg and Susan Sontag. Adapted from a published transcript, the film was praised for its minimalist style and emotional subtlety, with critics noting its reflection on time, creativity, and the poignancy of everyday life.

Sachs wrote and directed The Man I Love (2026), which premiered in the main competition at the 2026 Cannes Film Festival, where it was nominated for the Palme d’Or. The film is set in New York City and stars Rami Malek, Tom Sturridge, Luther Ford, Rebecca Hall, and Ebon Moss-Bachrach.

== Favorite films ==
Sachs submitted these 10 films as his favorites in The Sight and Sound Greatest Films of All Time 2022 poll. He wrote, "The greatest films ever made are for me the ones that have personally affected me most deeply. It is because of their impact that these very same films are the ones that have influenced me the greatest as an artist and filmmaker. These are the films that I hold on to as if each one were a member of my own family. They are the films that have made me who I am, as my father and mother have, my siblings and my cousins and my friends. I would be someone different if I had never seen any one of them. They are a part of me."

- The Mouth Agape (1974 France)
- Je Tu Il Elle (1974 Belgium, France)
- Vagabond (1985 France)
- Au hasard Balthazar (1966 France, Sweden)
- My Little Loves (1974 France)
- Veronika Voss (1982 West Germany)
- À Nos Amours (1983 France)
- Splendor in the Grass (1961 United States)
- National Velvet (1944 United States)
- Early Summer (1951 Japan)

== Personal life ==
Sachs is Jewish and gay. He described Keep the Lights On as a semi-autobiographical film. In January 2012, Sachs married artist Boris Torres in New York City, a few days before their twins were born. Sachs and Torres co-parent the children with documentary cinematographer and filmmaker Kirsten Johnson, who bore them.

He appeared in the German documentary Wie ich lernte die Zahlen zu lieben / How I Learned to Love the Numbers (2014) by Oliver Sechting and Max Taubert.

In December 2023, alongside 50 other filmmakers, Sachs signed an open letter published in the French newspaper Libération demanding a ceasefire and an end to the killing of civilians amid the 2023 Israeli invasion of the Gaza Strip, and for a humanitarian corridor into Gaza to be established for humanitarian aid, and the release of hostages.

== Filmography ==
=== Short film ===
| Year | Title | Director | Writer |
|---|---|---|---|
| 1991 | Vaudeville | Yes | Yes |
| 1994 | Lady | Yes | No |
| 2000 | 10/26/00 | Yes | Yes |
| 2002 | Untitled | Yes | No |
| 2002 | Get It while You Can | Yes | No |
| 2009 | Last Address | Yes | No |
| 2019 | Before I Forget (segment in 30/30 Vision: 3 Decades of Strand Releasing) | Yes | Yes |

=== Feature film ===
| Year | Title | Director | Writer | Producer |
|---|---|---|---|---|
| 1996 | The Delta | Yes | Yes | No |
| 2005 | Forty Shades of Blue | Yes | Yes | Yes |
| 2007 | Married Life | Yes | Yes | Yes |
| 2012 | Keep the Lights On | Yes | Yes | Yes |
| 2014 | Love Is Strange | Yes | Yes | Yes |
| 2016 | Little Men | Yes | Yes | Yes |
| 2019 | Frankie | Yes | Yes | No |
| 2023 | Passages | Yes | Yes | No |
| 2025 | Peter Hujar's Day | Yes | Yes | No |
| 2026 | The Man I Love | Yes | Yes | No |

== Awards and nominations ==
| Year | Award | Category | Nominated work | Result |
|---|---|---|---|---|
| 1997 | Sundance Film Festival | Grand Jury Prize | The Delta | Nominated |
| 1997 | Rotterdam International Film Festival | Outstanding Emerging Talent | The Delta | Nominated |
| 1997 | Gotham Awards | Open Palm Award | The Delta | Nominated |
| 2005 | Sundance Film Festival | Grand Jury Prize | Forty Shades of Blue | Won |
| 2005 | Deauville Film Festival | Grand Special Prize | Forty Shades of Blue | Nominated |
| 2012 | Sundance Film Festival | Grand Jury Prize | Keep the Lights On | Nominated |
| 2012 | Berlin International Film Festival | Teddy Award | Keep the Lights On | Won |
| 2012 | Chicago International Film Festival | Best Feature | Keep the Lights On | Nominated |
| 2012 | Cahiers du cinéma | Best Film | Keep the Lights On | 10th Place |
| 2013 | Independent Spirit Awards | Best Feature | Keep the Lights On | Nominated |
| 2013 | Independent Spirit Awards | Best Director | Keep the Lights On | Nominated |
| 2013 | Independent Spirit Awards | Best Screenplay | Keep the Lights On | Nominated |
| 2014 | Cahiers du cinéma | Best Film | Love Is Strange | 8th Place |
| 2014 | Deauville Film Festival | Grand Special Prize | Love Is Strange | Nominated |
| 2014 | Independent Spirit Awards | Best Feature | Love Is Strange | Nominated |
| 2014 | Independent Spirit Awards | Best Screenplay | Love Is Strange | Nominated |
| 2014 | Gotham Awards | Best Feature | Love Is Strange | Nominated |
| 2014 | Gotham Awards | Audience Awards | Love Is Strange | Nominated |
| 2014 | Satellite Award | Best Original Screenplay | Love Is Strange | Nominated |
| 2016 | Berlin International Film Festival | Best Feature Film | Little Men | Nominated |
| 2016 | Berlin International Film Festival | Teddy Award | Little Men | Nominated |
| 2016 | Deauville Film Festival | Grand Special Prize | Little Men | Won |
| 2016 | Edinburgh International Film Festival | Audience Award | Little Men | Nominated |
| 2017 | Independent Spirit Awards | Best Screenplay | Little Men | Nominated |
| 2019 | Cannes Film Festival | Palme d'Or | Frankie | Nominated |
| 2025 | Berlin International Film Festival | Best Feature | Peter Hujar's Day | Nominated |
| 2025 | Gijón International Film Festival | Best Film | Peter Hujar's Day | Nominated |
| 2026 | Independent Spirit Awards | Best Feature | Peter Hujar's Day | Nominated |
| 2026 | Independent Spirit Awards | Best Director | Peter Hujar's Day | Nominated |
| 2026 | USC Scripter Awards | Film | Peter Hujar's Day | Nominated |
