= The Year of the Runaways =

2015 novel by Sunjeev Sahota

- First edition
- Author: Sunjeev Sahota
- Published: 2015
- Publisher: Picador
- ISBN: 9781447241676

The Year of the Runaways is the second novel by British author Sunjeev Sahota. Published in June 2015, it was shortlisted for the 2015 Man Booker Prize and was awarded with a European Union Prize for Literature in 2017 (for the UK).

The novel focuses on the experiences of migrant workers in Britain. A critic for the Indian Express notes that "the novel tunnels through news headlines of immigration and caste debates" in a way that is "one of its transcendent strengths". The Telegraph commented that "the novel feels like a work of social protest" with "enough fine drawing of human foibles, of different idioms and of modern British life to fill up several lesser novels."

In 2020, Emma Lee-Potter of The Independent listed The Year of the Runaways as one of the 12 best Indian novels.
