= List of stock characters =

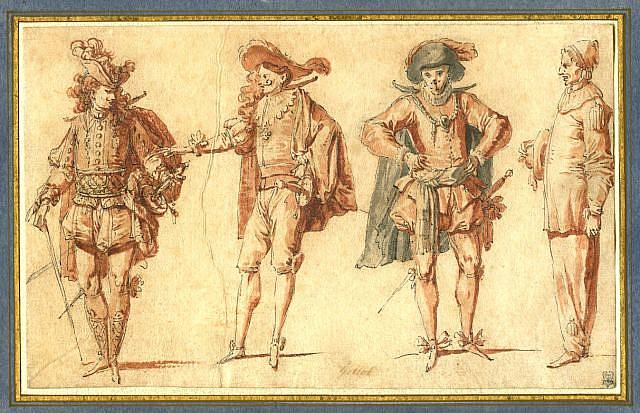
Claude Gillot (1673–1722) — Four Commedia dell'Arte Figures: Three Gentlemen and Pierrot, c. 1715 Stock characters from commedia dell'arte — which gave each character a standard costume, so easily distinguished – continued across many types of theater, dramatic storytelling, and fiction

A stock character is a dramatic or literary character representing a generic type in a conventional, simplified manner and recurring in many fictional works. The following list labels some of these stereotypes and provides examples. Some character archetypes, the more universal foundations of fictional characters, are also listed.

Some characters that were first introduced as fully fleshed-out characters become subsequently used as stock characters in other works – for example, the Ebenezer Scrooge character from A Christmas Carol, upon whom the "miser" stereotype is based, and whose name now has become a shorthand for it. Some stock characters incorporate more than one stock character; for example, a bard may also be a wisecracking jester.

Some of the stock characters in this list – reflecting the respective attitudes of the people of the time and the place in which they have been created – in hindsight, may be considered offensive due to their use of racial stereotyping, homophobia, or other prejudice.

== A ==
Character type	Description	Examples
Absent-minded professor/Boffin	An eccentric scientific genius stereotype who is so focused on their work that they have shortfalls in other areas of life, (remembering things, grooming, etc.). The shortened term for this character is a "boffin." It is the benign version of the mad scientist stereotype.	Prof. Calculus in The Adventures of Tintin series by Hergé; Sidney Stratton, played by Alec Guinness, in the 1951 satirical film The Man in the White Suit; Prof. Julius F. Kelp, played by Jerry Lewis, in the 1963 film The Nutty Professor; Dr. Egon Spengler, played by Harold Ramis, in the Ghostbusters film series; Dr. Emmett Brown, played by Christopher Lloyd, in the Back to the Future film series; Prof. Frink in the animated American television sitcom series The Simpsons, drawn on Prof. Kelp; Prof. Farnsworth in the animated American television sitcom series Futurama, drawn as an elderly Prof. Frink
Action hero	The brave and heroic protagonist of a story which portrays action, adventure, and often violence. They are resourceful, courageous, and have strong commitment to their cause, and they are comfortable with the fast pace of events in the story. Often overlaps with "chosen one" or superhero. They are often a competent man who is able to pilot any vessel or vehicle and use any weapon.	See: Action heroes.
Adolescent/juvenile action hero	This plucky, curious child or youth uncovers a villain's plans or finds characters in need of assistance though their investigations as a journalist, amateur sleuth or secret agent. They may have similar wide-ranging skills to the competent man. In other instances they may be well-intentioned but gullible, or bratty and irritating.	Tintin, a teenage journalist and detective; The Stranger Things gang; The Famous Five; The Hardy Boys; Jonny Quest; Spy Kids; James Bond Jr.; Spongebob; Dink the Little Dinosaur; Jake Lloyd as Anakin Skywalker; Scrappy-Doo
Agricultural labourer/shepherd/cowboy	In Western films the farmer or rancher employs a team of hands to round up livestock, harvest the crops and protect the homestead from bandits. The group usually includes a young rookie or greenhorn, an experienced old-timer and a cook who is usually a black American.	Owen Lars in Attack of the Clones; Wal Footrot in Footrot Flats; Mr. Hoggett in Babe; Boggis, Bunce and Bean in Fantastic Mr. Fox; Alan Ladd as Shane; Henry Fonda in The Grapes of Wrath; Peter Fogg in Postman Pat; Gabriel Oak in Far from the Madding Crowd; Bitzer the sheepdog in Shaun the Sheep; John Wayne in The Cowboys; Gene Autry in Back in the Saddle; Earl Reagan in Flesh
Albino	The albino has pale skin and long white hair and may be a magician or assassin. Is usually evil or an antihero. Albinism organisations and others have expressed criticism over the portrayal of individuals with albinism in popular culture, specifically in movies and fictional works, citing the overwhelmingly negative depiction. There is concern that such depictions could increase social bias and discrimination against individuals with albinism. This phenomenon is often referred to as the "evil albino" plot device.	Elric of Melniboné; Oswald in The Deptford Mice; Kotick the seal in The Jungle Book; Daenerys Targaryen in Game of Thrones; Otis B. Driftwood in The Devil's Rejects; Bad Bob (played by Stacy Keach) in The Life and Times of Judge Roy Bean; Silas in The Da Vinci Code; Azog in The Hobbit; Moby Dick the white whale
Alien	A visitor to Earth from another planet. May be a friendly little green man or a monstrous eldritch abomination with tentacles or an aggressive Xenomorph. Often pilots a flying saucer and possesses advanced technology.	E.T.; Pia Zadora as Girmar in Santa Claus Conquers the Martians; Chewbacca, Han Solo's Wookiee companion; The Purple People Eater; Superman from DC Comics; Alf from the Alf (TV series); The Sontarans in Doctor Who; The Martians in War of the Worlds; The Xenomorphs in Aliens
Alter kacker/grandpa/pensioner	Similar to the curmudgeon, a cantankerous, senile and lazy old man. May be Jewish or Eastern European. A grandpa who takes a more active role as head of the family is a patriarch. Enjoys telling stories about his glory days and giving the grandkids advice. The equivalent in Western films is the Old timer. If the grandpa is the hero, he is often a wizard or Don Quixote.	Lou Pickles in Rugrats; Geriatrix in Asterix; Abe Simpson; Max in Tweenies; Grandpa in Peter and the Wolf; Peter Falk in The Princess Bride; Clive Dunn as Grandad; Geoffrey Bayldon as Magic Grandad; Grandpa Phil in Hey Arnold!
Amazon/Shield maiden/Valkyrie	A female barbarian warrior from classical mythology and Norse mythology skilled at archery and equestrianism. Usually wears a short leather skirt or chain mail bikini, sword belt, sandals, sculpted bronze breastplate, and fur cloak. See also tomboy, cave girl and bad girl.	Hippolyta in the Twelve Labours of Hercules; Penthesilia in The Iliad; Eowyn in The Two Towers; Helga, wife of Hagar the Horrible; Abba in Asterix and the Vikings; Brunnhilde in the Nibelungenlied; Brida in The Last Kingdom; Dyala in Amazons; Dee Booher in Deathstalker 2; Xena: Warrior Princess; Valeria in Conan the Barbarian
Angels and demons	In fantasy, archangels are beautiful and ethereal beings with long blonde hair. Winged cherubs are small and childlike and carry a bow and arrow like Cupid from Greek mythology. Demons and nephilim are fallen angels and often have hooves, horns and tails like satyrs.	Cupid in Disney's Fantasia; Eric Draven in The Crow; Charlie in All Dogs Go to Heaven; Gabriel in Constantine; The Escort in Heaven Can Wait; Dolly Parton in Unlikely Angel; The fallen angels in Noah; Satan in Wreck-It Ralph; Pazuzu in The Exorcist; Little Nicky; The Cenobites in Hellraiser; Lucifer in Preacher; The demons in Red Hot Mamma
Angry black woman	A negatively stereotypical assertive, overbearing, opinionated, loud, and "sassy" American black woman – typically of the working class – with an acid tongue, often depicted as nagging and emasculating a male character. This stereotype is a more modern variant of the archetypes of the old shrew and the foul-mouthed and sharp-tongued fishwife character, exemplified by Molly Malone.	Mammy Two Shoes in the Tom and Jerry series of short animated films from the 1940s; Sapphire in the 1950s→1960s American radio and television series Amos 'n' Andy; Aunt Esther in the 1970s American television sitcom series Sanford and Son; Florence Johnston in the 1970s→1980s American television sitcom series The Jeffersons; Wilhelmina Slater in the 2000s American television series Ugly Betty; Mary Lee Johnston from the 2009 film Precious
Angry white man	A working class hidebound reactionary, white man whose frustration with progressive policies and social changes leading towards a more tolerant society – in which he has a lesser role and powerless to change this demotion – that leaves him at odds with accepted norms, so escalating into rage and on to violence, in extreme cases. In dramatic fiction, this usually leads to the character's downfall. In a running series, the angry white man may soften and become accepting with time to be more sympathetic – see also curmudgeon.	Alf Garnett, played by Warren Mitchell in a career-defining role from the 1960s to the 1980s, in the BBC television sitcom series Till Death Us Do Part and the follow-on series Till Death... and In Sickness and in Health; and his American counterpart Archie Bunker in the 1970s American television sitcom series All in the Family; William 'D-Fens' Foster in the 1993 film Falling Down; Howard Beale in the 1976 film Network; Ernest's grandad in East Is East; Combo and the skinheads in This Is England
Angry young man/Yobbo	A violent young antihero in British stories set during the 1960s, 1970s or 1980s who is frustrated by the monotony of his dead end job and the boredom of living in his grimy working class council estate. He finds purpose by joining a street gang and descends into petty crime, drinking, drug addiction and violence against other gangs that culminates in prison or the mortuary. Depending on the era, he may be a mod, teddy boy, rocker, street punk, or football hooligan/ chav. A stock character in kitchen sink drama.	Jimmy in Quadrophenia; Rico and Cain in Sumotherhood; John Boyega in Attack the Block; Pete and the Green Street Hooligans; John and the Neds; Ray Winstone in Scum; Johnny Rotten and Sid Vicious in The Great Rock 'n' Roll Swindle; Alex DeLarge and the Droogs in A Clockwork Orange; Roy in Cosh Boy; Christopher Eccleston in Let Him Have It
Animal trainer/jockey	A person who trains animals to carry out useful tasks or perform tricks. They are typically depicted as having a deep understanding of the animal they train, and a close, companionate relationship. May be a cop with a sniffer dog, circus performer, mahout with Indian elephant, racehorse jockey or zookeeper.	Officer Ruiz in A Dog's Purpose; Tiny the dog trainer in Stage Fright; Viggo Mortensen in Hidalgo; Tobey Maguire in Seabiscuit; The jockeys in Saddlesore Galactica are a race of monstrous trolls who live underground in a fiberglass tree.; Albert in War Horse; Sabu as Toomai of the Elephants in Elephant Boy
Annoying neighbor	A comic character known for being nosy and for pestering and hounding the protagonist. As they live next door to them, this creates a pretext for frequent unwanted or unplanned interactions.	Tini in the mid-20th century radio comedy series Fibber McGee and Molly; Newman in the 1990s American television sitcom series Seinfeld; Ned Flanders in animated American television sitcom series The Simpsons; Kimmy Gibler in the 1980s→90s American television sitcom series Full House; Jolyon Wagg in The Adventures of Tintin; Wally Walrus and Buzz Buzzard in Woody Woodpecker; Agnes Peenman is a hounding landlady to Stanley Ipkiss in The Mask; SpongeBob SquarePants is the annoying neighbor to Squidward Tentacles
Antihero	A protagonist lacking conventional heroic qualities, such as courage or idealism. An antihero has weaknesses and may engage in criminal acts at times, but lacks any sinister intentions and is usually, if begrudgingly and unconventionally, ethical.	James "Slippery Jim" Bolivar diGriz in The Stainless Steel Rat book series, starting in the 1950s, by Harry Harrison; The Man with No Name, played by Clint Eastwood, as the protagonist in the 1960s spaghetti Western Dollars Trilogy by Sergio Leone; Harry Flashman in the satirical The Flashman Papers book series by George MacDonald Fraser; Eddie Valiant in the 1981 book Who censored Roger Rabbit? by Gary K. Wolf; Deadpool in the Marvel Comics; Harley Quinn in the DC Comics
Antivillain	The opposite to the anti-hero, they are a well-intentioned or misunderstood antagonist who has character traits more commonly associated with a stock hero. He will uphold the law, save lives and try to capture the antihero protagonist. In a crime film he is often a police inspector in pursuit of a gentleman thief, con artist or fugitive wrongly accused of murder. The antivillain is often a noble adversary.	Javert in Les Miserables; Thomson and Thompson in The Crab with the Golden Claws; Boris Karloff as Frankenstein's Monster; Eric Finch in V for Vendetta; Jajuka in Escaflowne; Dean Wormer in Animal House; Vaako in The Chronicles of Riddick; Roland Tembo in The Lost World: Jurassic Park; Howard in Short Circuit; The sheriff in Westworld; Major Willoughby in Up in the World; Officer Dibble in Top Cat
Ape	Apes often appear as sidekicks in family comedy movies. Chimpanzees and orangutans are usually mischievous, gorillas are strong but protective, cryptids like Bigfoot or the yeti are misunderstood, and primitive humans are brutal and evil (see caveman).	Chim-Chim in Speed Racer; Muffit II, Boxey's pet daggit in Battlestar Galactica is part robot, part dog and part monkey; Clyde the orangutan in Every Which Way But Loose and Cannonball Run; King Kong; Rocko the gorilla doctor in Noah's Island; Dr Zaius in Planet of the Apes; Mighty Joe Young; Harry and the Hendersons; Mr Link in Missing Link; Ronald Reagan in Bedtime for Bonzo; The savage ape men in The Lost World by Arthur Conan Doyle
Apprentice/Squire	A younger person who is learning a profession or trade by working under the guidance of an experienced, older mentor. In the crafts and trades, the younger person may be called an apprentice, but in other fields, they may be called a protégé, intern, trainee, or rookie. In addition to learning technical skills, the mentor teaches the values and culture of the guild or profession. Apprentice characters range from hardworking, serious rookies who nonetheless make errors due to lack of experience, to problematic apprentices who may be careless, lazy, or mischievous. The apprentice's coming of age journey, as they transition to adulthood is known as a Bildungsroman. In fantasy, the wise mentor may be a wizard or witch. In historical stories, the mentor may be a Master craftsman in a guild, and a knight's trainee is a squire.	In the Star Wars stories, a young Jedi, Obi-Wan Kenobi, trains a headstrong and rebellious Jedi padawan named Anakin Skywalker; at the end of his life, Kenobi trains an apprentice named Luke Skywalker.; In "The Sorcerer's Apprentice" in Disney's Fantasia (1940), Mickey Mouse is an apprentice who tries to make his assigned chores easier by using forbidden spells.; In Crouching Tiger, Hidden Dragon, Jen Yu trains as a warrior under Jade Fox.; In Tom Tykwer's film Perfume: The Story of a Murderer, Jean-Baptiste Grenouille (Ben Whishaw) learns how to capture scents from master perfumist Giuseppe Baldini (Dustin Hoffman).; In Luc Besson's film Léon: The Professional, experienced hitman Léon (Jean Reno) teaches his illegal craft to an unusual apprentice: a 12-year-old orphan named Mathilda (Natalie Portman).; In Terry Pratchett's Discworld series, Mort apprentices with Death, a Grim Reaper-type character.; Alleyne in The White Company; Emun Elliott in Black Death
Arab and Muslim stereotypes	Arab and Muslim characters in Hollywood films are often portrayed in an ethno-centric or stereotyped way. These characters often were depicted as all generic relatively faceless and interchangeable, speaking in a heavy accent, being hostile and vicious, along with being connected to terrorism. As well, American films and television shows may have stereotypical and pejorative depictions of Arabs and Muslims. The American-Arab Anti-Discrimination Committee states that "Arabs in TV and movies are portrayed as either bombers, belly dancers, or [oil] billionaires".	Pejorative stereotypes of Arabs or Muslims as villains are common in late 20th century Hollywood action films including: Iron Eagle (1986); The Delta Force (1986); Death Before Dishonor (1987); Wanted: Dead or Alive (1987); Navy SEALs (1990); Patriot Games (1992); True Lies (1994); Executive Decision (1996); Achmed, the Dead Terrorist satirical puppet of the ventriloquist Jeffrey Dunham
Archaeologist/Palaeontologist/treasure hunter	An adventurer who travels the world digging up dinosaur fossils and lost civilisations. They have an extensive knowledge of their field and a headstrong personality. Often has a day job as a university professor.	Indiana Jones in Raiders of the Lost Ark; Alan Grant in Jurassic Park; Dan Garrett, the Blue Beetle; Rachel Weisz in The Mummy Returns; Lara Croft in Tomb Raider; Sophocles Sarcophagus in Cigars of the Pharaoh; Dirk Pitt in Sahara; Nicolas Cage in National Treasure; Phil Harding in Time Team
Archenemy/ Nemesis	A supervillain with a personal vendetta against the hero. They may have once been friends or fellow students of a shared wise old man mentor before the villain turned to evil. See: Villain	Professor Moriarty to Sherlock Holmes; Ernst Stavro Blofeld to James Bond; Darth Vader to Ben Kenobi; Lord Shin to Kenshiro; Erik Leinsherr to Charles Xavier; Doctor Doom to Reed Richards; The Joker to Batman
Arms dealer/gunsmith	A wealthy man who made his fortune from war profiteering and manufacturing and selling weapons. May be CEO of a large company, owner of a small town gun shop with "under the counter" Saturday night special guns for sale, part of the criminal underworld with a secret ghost gun workshop in the council estate, or a seemingly legitimate Old West trader illicitly running guns to the Indians or Latin American rebels. He is usually an amoral villain who sells arms to both sides in the conflict, but sometimes he is a patriot supporting the one side's war effort.	Hugh Laurie in The Night Manager; Daddy Warbucks in the 1940s editions of Little Orphan Annie; Audie Murphy in The Gun Runners; Obadiah Stane in Iron Man; Basil Bazaroff in Tintin and the Broken Ear; Donald Pleasence as Isaac Q. Cumber in Soldier Blue; Gunsmith Bitch in Panty & Stocking with Garterbelt; Nicolas Cage in Lord of War; Zorg in The Fifth Element
Artificial intelligence (AI)	In science fiction stories, artificial intelligence (AI) are depicted as computational systems that are sophisticated enough to perform tasks typically associated with human intelligence, such as learning, reasoning, problem-solving, perception, and decision-making. In contrast to mechanical robotic beings in fiction – some of which are depicted as having sophisticated AI capabilities – usually AI does not have a metal or humanoid body and they are instead depicted as residing in some type of computer system or network. AIs are depicted with varying degrees of ability to cause actions in the real world, ranging from communicating via text or speech synthesis to triggering digitally-connected devices. AIs may be depicted in a variety of ways, ranging from benevolent to neutral to hostile.	HAL 9000, the sentient artificial general intelligence computer that controls the systems of the Discovery One spacecraft and interacts with the ship's astronaut crew in Stanley Kubrick's 2001: A Space Odyssey film of 1968.; Skynet is a fictional group mind and artificial general superintelligence system that serves as the antagonistic force of the Terminator franchise.; Wintermute is one half of a super-AI entity in the 1984 dystopian cyberpunk novel Neuromancer by William Gibson; KITT in Knight Rider; The city computer in Logan's Run; President Eden in Fallout 3; Agent Smith in The Matrix; Mother Brain in Phantasy Star II; Omnius and Erasmus in Sandworms of Dune
Astronaut / spaceship captain	The science fiction counterpart to the explorer, flying ace and sea captain. They are courageous, charismatic, irresistible to women, skilled in both unarmed combat and the use of a ray gun, and resourceful in the face of emergencies. Often commands a crew that includes a scientist, a robot and a female love interest. In smaller spaceships or when in space, they wear a pressure suit, air supply and helmet. In large spaceships, they typically do not wear a spacesuit.	Alan Tracy in Thunderbirds; Buzz Lightyear in Toy Story; Buck Rogers; James Bond in Moonraker; John Adams in Forbidden Planet; John Crichton in Farscape; Jean-Luc Picard and James T Kirk in Star Trek
Athlete	This character portrays values such as determination and good sportsmanship as they develop their skills. They may be an underdog who overcomes the odds and defeats the champion. They typically have to face a range of obstacles, including physical challenges (learning advanced techniques) and psychological issues (developing confidence and judgment). They are often trained by a wise mentor or coach. Is often a boxer, wrestler, runner, swimmer, footballer, basketball player, baseball player or cyclist.	Some of the best-known underdog boxers are Sylvester Stallone as Rocky Balboa, Charles Bronson in Hard Times, Michael B. Jordan as Adonis Creed and Clint Eastwood as Philo Beddoes; Footballer protagonists include Roy of the Rovers, the cavemen in Early Man and The Hurricanes; Baseball players are depicted in Field of Dreams, Eight Men Out and The Benchwarmers.; Ben Cross plays Jewish runner Harold Abrahams in Chariots of Fire; James Caan as Jonathan E in Rollerball
Attorney at law/barrister/solicitor	In legal dramas, a lawyer who defends a wrongfully accused prisoner or prosecutes a dangerous criminal. A villainous sleazy lawyer will use dirty tricks to get their client acquitted and often they are on the payroll of the mob.	Atticus Finch in To Kill a Mockingbird; Rumpole of the Bailey; Peter Stone in Chicago Justice; Mark Rylance as William Kunstler in The Trial of the Chicago 7; Robert Conrad as The D.A.; Dean Jones as The Shaggy D.A.; Joe Ma as The Unusual Prosecutor; Harvey Kent before he became Two-Face
Aussie	Similar to the American hillbilly, the Aussie is a rugged survivalist who lives in a shack or trailer in the Australian outback, drives a Holden FJ ute and celebrates Christmas at the beach. Wears a slouch hat, work boots and cargo shorts and has a fondness for large sheath knives. Enjoys wrestling crocodiles and drinking cold beer.	Crocodile Dundee; Mick Jagger as Ned Kelly; Crash Bandicoot; Blinky Bill; Steve Irwin in The Crocodile Hunter: Collision Course; Mick in Wolf Creek; Tank Girl; Mel Gibson as Mad Max; The Swagman in Batman; Kylie Minogue in Neighbours
Author surrogate	A character sharing the traits or appearance of its author or creator. The author surrogate may be disguised to some degree, or there may be little attempt to make them appear different – for example, they may have the same first name and job.	Peter Guillam, the trusted right-hand man, in the George Smiley series of novels starting with the 1961 Call for the Dead by John le Carré; Ralphie Parker, the protagonist in Jean Shepherd's Parker Family Saga series of family-comedies starting with the 1966 novel In God We Trust: All Others Pay Cash; Henry Chinaski, played by Mickey Rourke in Charles Bukowski's comic semi-autobiographical 1987 film Barfly directed by Barbet Schroeder; Jon Arbuckle in the Garfield cartoon strip series; Steve Taylor, played by Jack Davenport, in Steven Moffat's 2000s British sitcom series Coupling; Kyle Broflovski and Stan Marsh in the American television sitcom series South Park

== B ==
Character type	Description	Examples
Baby-appearing man	A character who appears to be an infant with a diaper, pacifier and rattle, but has the voice and personality of a middle-aged man. In some cases, the baby has the voice and personality of a child several years older than their appearance.	In The Boss Baby, the eponymous infant wears a suit and tie and acts like a normal baby around parents, but acts like an adult when parents are absent.; In Who Framed Roger Rabbit, Baby Herman is a 50-year-old man in an infant's cartoon body. While he wears a diaper, he is chain-smoking and speaks with a deep-voiced Brooklyn accent.; In Al Murray's Multiple Personality Disorder Big Baby is an adult-sized baby who is a top business executive. His switches between his baby persona and his adult personality are played for laughs.; Swee'Pea in Popeye appeared to be a crawling baby, but could speak like an adult and throw punches if necessary.; In Rugrats, Tommy Pickles is a baby with abilities beyond his age. He uses a plastic screwdriver to escape his crib and explore, and he can speak in a mature way; his catchphrase is "A baby's gotta do what a baby's gotta do.; In Cool World, Slash is a diminutive and primate-like cartoon clad in a diaper-like undergarment and armed with retractable and nail-like claws on his finger. He serves as one of the femme fatale's "Goons."
Bad boy	See rake.	
Bad girl	A violent feminist antihero with a lip piercing and dyed hair, the female equivalent to the rebel or bad boy. Usually wears a leather jacket, boots and hot pants or miniskirt. See also femme fatale and dark lady.	Paige in Fighting with My Family; Margot Robbie as Harley Quinn; Lady Death; Ryoko in Gun Crazy: A Woman from Nowhere; Razor; Angela in Spawn; Lara Croft in Tomb Raider; Catwoman in Batman Returns
Banker/civil servant	A British private school alumnus who manages the local bank or oversees a government program (often one mired in red tape or political meddling). Wears a bowler hat with stroller, smokes a tobacco pipe, carries a rolled umbrella, and drives a Rover P4 painted in a conservative colour such as dark green or maroon. As his work is boring and he has a lot of free time, he might have a side hustle as a popular music composer, gentleman detective or officer in the army reserve.	Mr. Benn; Captain Mainwaring in Dad's Army; Mr. Banks in Mary Poppins; George Darling in Peter and Wendy; Roger Dearly in One Hundred and One Dalmatians; Mr. Poe in A Series of Unfortunate Events; Mr. Pond; Bernard Woolley in Yes Minister; John Steed in The Avengers
Barbarian	A fierce, wild but honorable warrior with uncut hair, tattoos, clothing made from animal skins and a large sword or axe. Consumes large quantities of red meat and beer for breakfast, lunch and dinner. Is often a mongol horseman or viking with a fondness for raiding and battles. Female barbarians are often Amazons who refuse to give up their virginity until the hero has proven himself worthy.	Erik the Viking; Kirk Douglas in The Vikings; Uhtred of Bebbanburg in The Last Kingdom; The Mongol warlord Bori Khan in Mulan; Kull the Conqueror; Red Sonja; Tyris Flare and Ax Battler, the original main characters in Golden Axe; Thor in Marvel comics; The Viking slavers in Primal; John Wayne as Genghis Khan in The Conqueror; In Warhammer 40K the White Scars are Mongolian outlaw bikers and the Space Wolves are Viking space marines with power armour
Bard	An archetype in Medieval and Renaissance stories of a lute-playing singer-songwriter who sings about the events of the day to earn a living. The Bard may be a travelling troubadour going town-to-town and playing at inns and busking in the street. They may have a wealthy patron and entertain in a noble court – playing for royalty at feasts – so may overlap with the jester, if they use their songs to speak blunt truths to a king or entertain the nobles with humour, (also providing comic relief in the story). The bard may also be a wandering minstrel who voyages with the hero to chronicle the hero's exploits in song.	Cacofonix in the Asterix and Obelix French comic book series since the 1960s by René Goscinny and Albert Uderzo; Dandelion / Jaskier in the fantasy book series The Witcher starting in 1990 by Andrzej Sapkowski; Marillion in the fantasy book series A Song of Ice and Fire starting in 1991 by George R.R. Martin; Cantus in the 1980s television puppet show series Fraggle Rock; Gabrielle in the 1990s American television drama series Xena: Warrior Princess; Edgin Darvis in the 2023 fantasy heist comedy film Dungeons & Dragons: Honor Among Thieves
Bartender/innkeeper	Owner or operator of a tavern, inn, saloon bar, public house or hotel where the heroes first meet. They may provide advice or clues to the hero. Is often assisted by an attractive barmaid who may be his daughter. Keeps a baseball bat or other weapon beneath the bar for breaking up drunken brawls. There is a range of types of bartenders/innkeepers, from respected members of their community to town villains who operate sleazy establishments linked to crime and prostitution. In gangster films, the villain oftens owns a nightclub which is a front for illegal activity.	Moe Syszlak in The Simpsons; Jim Hawkins' mother in Treasure Island; Madame Rosmerta in Harry Potter; Diane Sugden in Emmerdale; Wuher, the ill-tempered bartender at the dangerous Mos Eisley cantina in Star Wars; In The Great Mouse Detective the barmaid poisons Basil's drink; Orthopaedix in Asterix and Caesar's Gift; Barliman Butterbur in Lord of the Rings; Phil Mitchell in EastEnders; Ronnie and Reggie in The Krays
Bastard	A variant of the black sheep, often the unwanted son of a wealthy and powerful man. He may be a treacherous villain seeking to steal the family fortune from the legitimate heirs, or a self-made man who rises from rags to riches through his own efforts.	Richard Sharpe in Sharpe's Eagle; Jon Snow in Game of Thrones; Cosette in Les Miserables; Stapleton in Hound of the Baskervilles; Madonna as Evita; Mordred in The Death of King Arthur; Albert Finney as Tom Jones; Esther in Bleak House; Historia in Attack on Titan
Battle-axe	This is a traditional derogatory stereotype describing an old woman characterized as aggressive, brash, brazen overbearing, and forceful. The term originated in the early 20th century as a descriptor independent of gender, but became primarily applied to just women around the middle of the century.	Thelma Harper, played by Vicki Lawrence in the 1960s→1970s American television sketch comedy series The Carol Burnett Show; Agnes Skinner, the domineering mother of Principal Skinner in the American television animated sitcom series The Simpsons; Marie Barone in the American television sitcom series Everybody Loves Raymond; Dot Cotton in EastEnders; Aughra in the Dark Crystal: Age of Resistance; Margaret Thatcher in Spitting Image
Beatnik	A hipster character, with a distinct counterculture style (usually wearing black or muted colors, turtlenecks, leotards for women, a beret, and sunglasses), loves jazz and avant-garde art and poetry, marijuana, bongo drums, and has a disdain for anything popular in mainstream culture. See also hippie.	Eddy Crane, the leader of a crime gang in the 1960 film The Beatniks; Maynard G. Krebs in the 1960s American television sitcom The Many Loves of Dobie Gillis; Dean McCoppin, voiced by Harry Connick Jr., in the 1999 animated film The Iron Giant based on Ted Hughes's 1968 novel The Iron Man; Judy Funnie in the 1990s American television animated children's sitcom series Doug; The cast of Off Beat Cinema
Bellboy/ hotel doorman/ porter	The uniformed bellhop and doorman greet visitors to a fine hotel, operate the elevator and carry their bags to the room. They must have great discretion, as they are privy to their guest's private lives. As well, they must be patient with the foibles of the elite that they serve. A similar character is the cheery railway porter who moves passengers' trunks with a hand truck.	Sting in Quadrophenia; Spirou; Zero in The Grand Budapest Hotel; Albert in Oh! Mr Porter; Skimbleshanks in Cats
Besserwessi/ East and West Germans	As with the North-South divide in England, there is a division in Germany between the affluent West and the post-German Reunification East. The typical West German or Wessi is wealthy but lazy, wears trendy designer brand denim, always has curry sauce on his chips, and drives a new BMW or Mercedes-Benz. The West German goes on vacation to Benidorm where he leaves his towel all day on the sun lounger and wears an aloha shirt, socks with sandals and short shorts over a thong bathing suit. The East German or Ossi has a mullet haircut, wears clothes 10 years behind current trends, is addicted to gherkins and jagdwurst, lives in a grey Stalin era apartment block, and drives a tiny Trabant. East Germans prefer vacationing at a nudist beach on the Baltic coast or camping in a wigwam and playing Cowboys and Indians.	Charles Dreyer in King, Queen, Knave; Lola's affluent customers; Lehmann in Berlin Blues; The Lost Honour of Katharina Blum; Christiane in Goodbye Lenin; Michael in Sonnenallee; Udo in Go Trabi Go; Gerd Wiesler in The Lives of Others; Suzi In A Land That No Longer Exists; Fritzi – A Revolutionary Tale; Harry in The Tunnel; The Wicked Dreams of Paula Schultz; Doris and Peter in Balloon; Henrik in NVA; Gunther in Trabbi Goes to Hollywood
Big eater	Anyone who is shown to have a large appetite and a strong interest in food, usually a sidekick to the hero. Is often a lovable rogue who cons his friends into buying him a meal. The villainous equivalent is the glutton.	Albert "Pop Pop" and Kenny from The Loud House; Beano Froelich from Out of This World; Billy Bunter; Bombur in The Hobbit; Fatty in The Beano; Fuu from Samurai Champloo; Greedy Pigg in The Dandy; J. Wellington Wimpy in Popeye; Michelangelo in Teenage Mutant Ninja Turtles; Monkey D. Luffy in One Piece; Obelix in The Twelve Tasks of Asterix; Slimer in Ghostbusters; Taz in Looney Tunes; The Very Hungry Caterpillar
Big sister /babysitter	An older girl who takes care of the younger kids. Can be bossy and selfish, or a protective role model who gives good advice.	Lucy Van Pelt in Peanuts; Dee Dee in Dexter's Laboratory; Lori Loud in The Loud House; Frankie Foster in Foster's Home for Imaginary Friends; Vicki in The Fairly Oddparents; Kirsty in The Baby-Sitters Club; Elisabeth Shue in Adventures in Babysitting; Candi in The Babysitter; Suzi in Rugrats
Billionaire/ millionaire	A wealthy tycoon who lives in a mansion and is driven around in a Rolls Royce or Packard. May be a genius inventor and successful self-made businessman, Texan oil baron with ten gallon hat and nudie suit, amoral banker or stockbroker, reclusive miser, or young playboy who throws wild parties. If he comes from an old money background he is usually a lord and will always wear a top hat and tailcoat.	Mr. Burns; Flintheart Glomgold in Ducktales; Thaddeus Plotz in Animaniacs; Tony Stark; Bruce Wayne; Norman Osborne; Gomez Addams; The Great Gatsby; Matt's Million; Gordon Gekko
Bimbo/Dumb blonde	Typically a female character who is totally reliant on her attractive appearance to get on in life and is normally supported by a well-off sugar daddy. This stereotype can be of little depth of character and poor intellect or contrariwise, can have hidden depths and keen wits who keeps her intelligence under wraps. In romances, the character is often an initial source of sexual attention for a hero, and a side-track of the story, before he realises that another is the love of his life and is the real heroine. Unlike the ingénue character, who grows emotionally and more worldly-wise through the story eventually fulfilling a heroine role, typically a bimbo does not and remains ultimately inconsequential, even if the pointlessness of her life is pointed out to her. A variant of this stereotype is the vacuous or empty-headed dumb blonde, who is usually a very attractive, young, and nubile blonde-haired woman with little common sense and very little, if anything, to say – literally dumb.	Lorelei Lee in the 1953 film Gentlemen prefer Blondes; Pola Debevoise in the 1953 film How to Marry a Millionaire; The Girl, played by Marilyn Monroe, in the 1955 film The Seven Year Itch; Goldie Hawn's characters in the 1970s→1980s American television comedy series Rowan & Martin's Laugh-In; Chrissy Snow in the 1960s→1970s American television sitcom series Three's Company; Jennifer Johnson / G-Girl, played by Uma Thurman, in the 2006 film My Super Ex-Girlfriend; Shelley Darlington, played by Anna Faris, in the 2008 film The House Bunny; Leni Loud in the animated American television sitcom series The Loud House
Birdman	A character with bird-like physical features such as a beak and wings, or an ancient Greek inventor piloting a glider made from feathers. May be a fallen angel, human mutant or the last survivor of an ancient civilisation.	King Vultan in Flash Gordon; Birdperson in Rick and Morty; Hawkgirl; Skellig; Peter the chicken boy in Epic Movie; Icarus in The Storyteller: Greek Myths; Red Skelton in the prologue to Those Magnificent Men In Their Flying Machines; Big Bird in Sesame Street; The Sneetches
Blacksmith	A skilled metalworker and craftsman who is the only person able to repair the hero's weapon or shoe his horse. In fantasy, the blacksmith may be able to imbue an item with magical powers. Is often a dwarf. Modern counterparts, who have advanced technical skills, include the technician, mechanic, inventor and engineer.	Regin in Die Nibelungen; Weyland the Smith; Conan the Barbarian's father; Doc Brown in Back to the Future Part III; Domhnall in Hellboy II: The Golden Army; Telchar in The Silmarillion; Old Man Mole in Redline; The Armorer in The Mandalorian who smelts, forges, and repairs armor.
Black best friend	In American films and television shows, the Black best friend is a secondary character, often female, who is used to "guide White characters out of challenging circumstances..." and "... support[s] the heroine, often with sass, attitude, and a keen insight into relationships and life". One disparagement of this stock character is that not much of their inner life is depicted and have little or no character development.	Renée Raddick, played by Lisa Nicole Carson — the friend of Calista Flockhart's eponymous protagonist – in the 1990s American television legal drama series Ally McBeal; Andrea Marino, played by Aisha Tyler — the friend of Jennifer Love Hewitt's lead character, Melinda Gordon — in the 2000s American television supernatural drama series Ghost Whisperer; Lily, played by Tracie Thoms — the friend of Anne Hathaway's lead character, Andy Sachs – in the 2006 film The Devil Wears Prada; Liz, played by Liza Lapira, — the variant Asian-American best friend of Hannah Weaver, played by Emma Stone — in the 2011 film Crazy, Stupid, Love is a variant of this character.
Black Panthers leader/Black power leader	This stock character depicts African-American Black Panthers-type leaders who call for Black Power, Black empowerment, and Black nationalism and protest racism and police brutality. Subtypes include militant revolutionaries who engage in direct action, heists, and armory break-ins; messianic civil rights leader-intellectuals who pen manifestos and lead non-violent protests and boycotts; and Black community leaders (often women) who run free social programs to support Black communities. They are depicted wearing black leather jackets or trenchcoats and black berets with Black Power emblems; Afro hairstyles; a kerchief for women; a Fez hat; and sunglasses. Militants may be armed with a shotgun or rifle and wear a bandolier with extra shells. Black radical leaders tend to be depicted in stories set in the 1960s and 1970s and Blaxploitation films, but they also appear in works set in recent decades. See also civil rights activist.	In Do the Right Thing, a 1989 film, Buggin' Out is angry about the lack of representation of Black celebrities on a local pizzeria's "wall of fame", and he encourages the Black community to boycott the restaurant.; In Black Dynamite, a 2012 Blaxploitation TV series, Stuey Fig Newton is the leader of the fictional "Black Pumas" organization, a Black Panthers–type militant group. He always wears sideburns, a black turtleneck, black leather jacket, sunglasses and a black beret. This character is inspired by real life Black Panthers founder Huey Newton.; In A Different World, an American sitcom (1987–1993), Terence Taylor is a student at a Historically Black college who advocates for strengthening Black communities. He dresses in a Black Panthers-inspired way, with long black coats and Fez hats.; In Black Panther, a 2018 film, N'Jadaka/Erik "Killmonger" Stevens is a black ops mercenary and former U.S. Navy SEAL who seeks to overthrow his cousin T'Challa and enforce his own opinion on how Wakanda should be ruled. The depiction is influenced by Malcolm X, Marcus Garvey, Huey P. Newton, Fred Hampton and Tupac Shakur.; Chi-Raq, a 2015 film, has examples of two subtypes. Lysistrata, named after the Ancient Greek heroine, is a feminist Black leader who is an example of the militant subtype (she raids a National Guard armory to get guns for the Black activist movement and leads a sex strike). Ms. Ellen is an example of the intellectual Black Power figure (she has extensive knowledge of the academic literature on Black revolutionary thought).; In Dear White People, a 2014 film, Samantha White is a Black activist who takes action against her university's racist housing policy that segregates students by race and she advocates to give Black students more of a voice.
Black knight	An evil warrior antagonist, whose identity is typically concealed behind his visor. He displays no coat of arms, to mask both his own identity and that of his liege. This character has a strong connotation to or is associated with death and this role is their to battle the good knight-errant for the latter to prove his worth.	The Black Knight in the 1975 film Monty Python and the Holy Grail; Nathan Garrett in the Marvel Comics; Darth Vader and Kylo Ren in the Star Wars film series; Thulsa Doom in Conan the Barbarian; The Witch King of Angmar in Return of the King; The Black Knight Ghost in Scooby-Doo 2; King Richard I in Ivanhoe
Black widow	A female serial killer who murders her lovers, usually with poison. Is often an alluring vamp or femme fatale. Sometimes, though, she is a harmless-looking old spinster.	Catherine Tramell in Basic Instinct; Natasha Romanoff in Iron Man comics; Ginger Rogers in Black Widow; Barbara Steele in The Pit and the Pendulum; The two elderly aunts in Arsenic and Old Lace
Blind seer	A prophet and mystic who is sightless or has poor vision – very common in assisting a hero in his quest in ancient myth – but uses spiritual or psychic powers to sense the events and sights around them.	The blind prophet Tiresias of Greek myth; The three nymphs called Graeae, or Phoricdes, or the aged Grey Sisters of Greek myth who shared one eye and one tooth between them; Phineus of Greek myth and character in the 1963 film Jason and the Argonauts; The blind Taoist monk "One Hundred Eyes" in Marco Polo
Blind warrior	Especially as a warrior-monk, a seemingly harmless sightless warrior who uses spiritual or psychic powers to sense the events and sights around them – a trope more common in the Far East.	Zatoichi, the Edo-period blind swordsman, of the 1948 Japanese story Zatoichi Monogatari; Chirrut Imwe in the Star Wars film of 2016 Rogue One; Kanan Jarrus, the blind Jedi knight, in animated US television series Star Wars Rebels; Kenshi Takahashi in Mortal Kombat; Thorkild the blind warrior and seer in The Saga of Erik the Viking; The blind gunslinger in Blindman; Rutger Hauer in Blind Fury; The Master in Master of the Flying Guillotine
Blonde girl	A recurring female archetype in Western theater, cinema, and television divided into two primary historical variations: the glamorous "blonde bombshell" and the naive "dumb blonde." Popularized in 20th-century Hollywood, the blonde bombshell exudes dazzling sex appeal, sophistication, and magnetic charisma, whereas the dumb blonde is portrayed as bubbly, gullible, superficial, and lacking common sense—often paired as a comedic foil to a more practical brunette. In modern media, the archetype is frequently subverted by depicting the character as hiding sharp intellect, strategic ambition, or emotional depth behind a hyper-feminine facade.	Lorelei Lee in Gentlemen Prefer Blondes (1925) by Anita Loos and its 1953 film adaptation, portrayed by Marilyn Monroe; Jean Harlow's screen personas in Bombshell (1933) and Dinner at Eight (1933); Chrissy Snow in Three's Company (1977–1984); Rose Nylund in The Golden Girls (1985–1992); Cher Horowitz in Clueless (1995); Elle Woods (subverted variation) in Legally Blonde (2001); Penny in The Big Bang Theory (2007–2019)
Bluestocking	An educated, intellectual, and literary woman, historically stereotyped in 18th- and 19th-century satire as pedantic, unfashionable, and disdainful of traditional domesticity or romance. In comedy of manners and Victorian fiction, she is often portrayed as an intimidating academic or eccentric reformer who eventually either softens through love or outsmarts pompous male counterparts.	Mrs. Malaprop (satirical variation) in The Rivals (1775) by Richard Brinsley Sheridan; Mary Bennet in Pride and Prejudice (1813) by Jane Austen; Jo March (literary variation) in Little Women (1868) by Louisa May Alcott; Hermione Granger in the Harry Potter series (1997–2007) by J. K. Rowling
Bobby soxer/teenybopper	Similar to the Jazz Baby, a teen girl from the 1940s-50s who loves jazz, swing music, doo-wop and rock & roll. Wears saddle shoes and a poodle skirt with petticoats and is often dating a greaser.	The pink ladies in Grease; Sally Swing; Shirley Temple in The Bachelor and the Bobby-Soxer; Aneta Corseaut in The Blob; The girls in the All the Cats Join In segment from Make Mine Music; Veronica Lodge in Archie Comics
Bogeyman/monster under the bed	A terrifying supernatural being that feeds on fear and abducts children. May be an urban legend or the alter ego of a serial killer. Often wears a hood made of burlap.	Fungus the Bogeyman; Oogie Boogie in Nightmare Before Christmas; Sully and Mike in Monsters, Inc.; The Creeper in Jeepers Creepers; The Boogieman in Monsters in the Closet is a friend of Nilus the Sandman who loves playing the blues on a grand piano and has no interest in scaring kids.; The Babadook; Jason Voorhees in Friday the 13th Part 2; Michael Myers in Halloween; The monsters in Don't Look Under the Bed
Bogatyr	Most commonly found in East Slavic epic poems—bylinas, the bogatyr is a heroic warrior possessing great strength, martial prowess and religious fervor, much like the Western European knight-errant.	Dobrynya Nikitich in the 2006 animated film Dobrinya and the Dragon; Ilya Muromets and Svyatogor in the 1956 Soviet film Ilya Muromets
Bomb disposal expert	They are depicted as brave, resourceful experts who are cool under the pressure of a ticking countdown clock and the risk of certain death. In part, their confidence comes from their encyclopedic knowledge of explosives, timers, triggers and booby traps and their ability to think on their feet, but they may also have spiritual or philosophical beliefs that enable them to face down extreme danger. In some cases, they make detective-like deductions about the bomb-maker's intentions from clues in the device that help them to defuse it. They tend to be quirky lone wolf types or misfits who resist instructions from authority and rules, a behavior which is tolerated due to their elite status and rarity. In military and police stories, the bomb disposal expert may be the protagonist or a secondary character. In action movies and spy thrillers, they may be part of an ensemble cast of military or law enforcement characters.	In Blown Away (1994) veteran Boston Police bomb squad officer Jimmy Dove (Jeff Bridges) and the rest of his team are targeted by an IRA bomber. Dove has to defuse a number of increasingly complex and booby-trapped bombs.; In The Hurt Locker (2008) US Army Explosive Ordinance Disposal specialist William James (James Renner) disarms improvised explosive devices during the Iraq war.; In The Peacemaker (1997), a US Army Colonel (George Clooney) and a civilian expert (Nicole Kidman) disassemble the lens on a stolen Russian nuclear bomb.
Born Sexy Yesterday	An idealized love interest who, while physically mature, is submissive and naive to the workings of the real world, relying upon an average man who comes off as extraordinary to her. This archetype has been heavily scrutinized for promoting infantilization and inequality within romantic relationships.	Leloo from The Fifth Element; Quorra from TRON: Legacy; Weena from The Time Machine
Bounty hunter	Bounty hunters are freelance fugitive trackers who take the risk of capturing criminals for the reward. They often operate in a legal grey zone, because while they may be permitted to capture the fugitives, and they may coordinate with law enforcement, they are not police officers. They are often lone wolves with a past in law enforcement, the military or crime. They range from honorable, noble former law enforcement officers who only take lawful bounties and who aim to bring criminals to justice to morally ambiguous characters with a mix of lawful and shady motivations to villainous ex-criminals who are only after profit, who take on illegal or shady bounties, and who use lawless tactics to capture or kill their prey. Bounty hunters are depicted in Westerns, Western-inspired science fiction set in lawless frontier planets, modern neo-Westerns, and in other modern day fiction.	Westerns: Douglas Mortimer, a former army colonel, played by Lee Van Cleef, and an unnamed taciturn gunfighter, played by Clint Eastwood, team up as bounty hunters in the 1965 film For a Few Dollars More; In The Wild Bunch (1969), a team of bounty hunters chase the eponymous group of outlaws to Mexico.; Django, played by Jamie Foxx — a former slave who becomes a bounty hunter to find and free his wife – in the 2012 film Django Unchained; Science fiction: Boba Fett and Greedo in Star Wars film series; Rick Deckard, played by Harrison Ford, in the 1982 film Blade Runner; Spike Spiegel in the 1998 film Cowboy Bebop; Other fiction: Domino Harvey, played by Keira Knightley, in the 2005 film Domino; Ralph "Papa" Thorson, played by Steve McQueen, in the 1980 film The Hunter; Jack Walsh, a former police officer, played by Robert De Niro, in the 1988 film Midnight Run; The Zeron Brotherhood, voiced by Darin de Paul and Ann Dowd, in the 2018–2019 animated series 3Below: Tales of Arcadia; Birdie/Halcon, voiced by Fiona Shaw, in the 2018–2019 animated series 3Below: Tales of Arcadia
Boy next door	A nice, average guy who is reasonably, but not too good-looking with few distinguishing quirks. If any quirks are exhibited, then these are minor or played for comedic effect. If he is popular with the younger audience, he may become a teen idol.	Rodney Trotter in the 1980s BBC television sitcom series Only Fools and Horses; Marty McFly in the 1980s film series Back to the Future; Kay in The Snow Queen; Shane Ramsay in Neighbours; Michael Landon in Bonanza; Davy Jones of the Monkees
Boy Scout/Brownie Guide	The Boy Scout wears a Smokey Bear hat, neckerchief with woggle and shorts with knee socks, is good at tying knots and enjoys camping in the woods where he whittles sticks with a Swiss army knife and sings Ging Gang Goolie. The Brownie or Girl Scout wears a beret, brown skirt and yellow sweater and spends most of her time baking cakes and cookies and selling them to raise money for charity. The adult leaders are often a married couple. Skip is usually a middle-aged man resembling Ned Flanders while Brown Owl is an older housewife who runs the village hall and is involved in every local community project.	Totor; Sam in Moonrise Kingdom; Russell in Up; Jimmy in Cripple Fight; Young Indiana Jones; Pat in Ghosts; The Verger in Dad's Army; Jade in Jackie Chan Adventures; Lumberjanes; Annie in East Is East; Jennyanydots in Cats
Braggart/Miles Gloriosus/Falstaff	Originally, the ancient archetype of a boastful soldier whose cowardice belies his claims of a valour-filled past that dates to the Classical antiquity, tapping a rich vein in both satire and comedy. This stock character speaks with excessive pride and self-satisfaction about their achievements, possessions, or abilities, typically to prove their superiority and create admiration or envy. Some braggarts may misrepresent or exaggerate their accomplishments. His boasts may also extend to his purported feats in the bedroom. In the comic theatre of ancient Rome, this stock character – as alazon and the two variants miles gloriosus and senex iratus — was often from a low class and he was typically engaged in sexual dalliances, excess drinking, and thievery. In commedia dell'arte, the boastful Il Capitano was one of the four core stock characters. He brags about dubious tales of military or sexual prowess to hide his cowardly nature. Sir John Falstaff created by William Shakespeare, is the popular epitome of the braggart with the comic character – noted for having the most appearances and more lines than any other character in the plays – who is depicted as a fat, vain, and boastful knight who spends most of his time carousing and hanging about with petty criminals; living on borrowed, looted, or stolen money. He is ultimately repudiated by other major characters who eventually see him for the debauched, dissolute character he is. The word "Falstaffian" has entered the English language with a connotation of being corpulent, jolly, and debauched. After overplaying his cards once too often with the king, he gets his comeuppance in Henry V.	Classical archetypes are: Alazon; Pyrgopolynices, the eponymous protagonist of the 3rd-century BCE play Miles Gloriosus, "The Braggart Soldier", by Titus Maccious Plautus; Il Capitano, the titular lead of the Italian commedia dell'arte play Il Capitano.; Falstaff in the 16th-century plays Henry IV, Part 1 and Henry IV, Part 2 and as the protagonist in The Merry Wives of Windsor by William Shakespeare. He has appeared in other works, including: Operas by Giuseppe Verdi, Ralph Vaughan Williams, and Otto Nicolai; In Orson Welles's 1966 film Chimes at Midnight; Baron Munchausen in the eponymous 1785 novel Baron Munchausen's Narrative of His Marvellous Travels and Campaigns in Russia by Rudolf Erich Raspe, with many stage adaptations including the 1988 film by Terry Gilliam; Harry Flashman in 1970s The Flashman Papers satirical book series by George MacDonald Fraser; Bob Pigeon played by William Richert in Gus Van Sant's 1991 film My Own Private Idaho; Buzz Lightyear in the first Pixar CGI-animated film Toy Story in 1995 and its sequels; Spence, the British mercenary who is revealed to be a coward, in the 1998 film Ronin; Zapp Brannigan in the animated American television sitcom series Futurama; Carlton Lassiter in the American television comic-drama detective series Psych; Volstagg the Voluminous, a companion of Thor, in Marvel Comics.
Brat/prankster	A naughty boy or mischievous young man who plays practical jokes on unsuspecting bystanders, especially authority figures such as the schoolmaster or constable. Often carries a peashooter or slingshot with stink bombs.	Officer Mahoney in Police Academy; Dennis the Menace in The Beano; Quick and Flupke; Max and Moritz; Lord Reginald in Up in the World; Horrid Henry; Bart Simpson; Mortimer Mouse; Laurel and Hardy in Brats
Brain in a jar	An evil brain, often with eyeballs and tentacles, that lives in a fluid-filled glass container. In science fiction and horror movies this villain is often a mad scientist who has created a life support system after his body was destroyed.	Krang in Teenage Mutant Ninja Turtles; Hector Con Carne in Evil Con Carne; The Think Tank in Fallout New Vegas; General Grievous in Star Wars; Schicklgruber in They Saved Hitler's Brain; The Man with Two Brains; The Daleks in Doctor Who; Kane in Robocop 2; Irvin in The City of Lost Children
Bug-eyed monster/Alien	Staple evil aliens in science fiction of the 1930s onward were often described – or pictured on covers of pulp magazines – as grotesque creatures with huge, oversized or compound eyes and a lust for blood, women, or general destruction.	The Vogons satirised this stock character in The Hitchhiker's Guide to the Galaxy series by Douglas Adams; The xenomorph creatures in the film series Alien, ironically though, to make it seem more scary, these have no eyes at all; Formics in the book series Ender's Game; The evil Brain Bug in Starship Troopers; The baby squid alien in Men in Black; Evil grey aliens appears in The X-Files; Roger in American Dad
Bully	A villainous character often found in stories centered around youth, especially in school. They are often taller and larger than the other characters. They delight in tormenting the protagonist, often using emotional abuse and physical threats, humiliating assaults or robbery. The bully may be revealed to have their own emotional or psychological challenges. They often have followers who reinforce their authority.	Harry Flashman in Tom Brown's School Days 1857 book by Thomas Hughes; Henry Bowers in the 1986 horror story It by Stephen King; Draco Malfoy in the Harry Potter book series by J. K. Rowling; Scut Farkus in 1983 comedy film A Christmas Story; Biff Tannen in the 1980s film series Back to the Future; Roger Klotz in the 1990s American television animated sitcom series Doug
Butchers, bakers, candle makers and other petty bourgeoisie	A shopkeeper or small business owner. The baker or miller is up at dawn to make flour and bake bread. The costermonger is coarse and vulgar and frequently ends up on the wrong side of the law. The hardware store owner is obsessive-compulsive and gets annoyed when customers interfere with his meticulously organised stock. The newsagent or confectioner is a kindly uncle figure adored by the kids. The joke shop owner is a mischievous prankster who may be a retired circus clown. The butcher is a jovial man in a red seersucker apron who gives bones and treats to the neighbourhood dogs, but may secretly be a serial killer who dismembers corpses in his slaughterhouse.	Warden Hodges in Dad's Army; The butcher, baker and toymaker in Somewhere in Dreamland; Ted Sandyman in Lord of the Rings; Wallace and Gromit in A Matter of Loaf and Death; Gene Hackman in Prime Cut; The bakers In the Night Kitchen; Mr Wax the candle maker in The Dreamstone; Unhygenix the fishmonger in Asterix; Mrs. Lovett in Sweeney Todd; The butcher in Hannibal Rising; Monsieur Le Boucher in Boule et Bill; The Watson brothers in Butchers; Bill the Candy Man in Willy Wonka & the Chocolate Factory; The narrator of The Giraffe and the Pelly and Me; Fred and George Weasley in Harry Potter; Arkwright in Open All Hours; Tierso in Wrong Side of the Tracks; A greengrocer catches Ann Darrow stealing fruit in King Kong
Butler/Maid/ Meido	A common supporting character in period dramas set in English country houses. The butler is in charge of a team of servants and may be a robot in science fiction works. Butlers in action films often double as bodyguards or assassins. A villainous butler may seek to do in his aged employers or their heirs to collect the inheritance. In anime, manga, and visual novels, female domestic servants are usually dressed in a stylized Victorian-inspired frilly apron and headdress. Ranging from fiercely competent, deadpan combat specialists to clumsy, overly apologetic caretakers, the character blends traditional subservient etiquette with fierce loyalty to her master or mistress. In smaller middle-class houses, the lady's maid will also serve as the housekeeper, cook and nanny.	Jeeves and Wooster; Geoffrey in The Fresh Prince of Bel-Air; Mr Carson in Downton Abbey; Mercer in Pirates of the Caribbean: Dead Man's Chest; Auric Goldfinger's butler Oddjob; Hayate the Combat Butler; Protocol droid C-3PO in Star Wars; Edgar in The Aristocats; Lurch in The Addams Family; Nanny Cook in 101 Dalmatians; Sarah Moffat in Upstairs, Downstairs; Louisa Trotter in The Duchess of Duke Street; Rem and Ram in Re:Zero − Starting Life in Another World (2012–present); Sakuya Izayoi in the Touhou Project series (1996–present); Roberta in Black Lagoon (2002–present); Tohru in Miss Kobayashi's Dragon Maid (2013–present)
Byronic hero	Byronic heroes are dark, gloomy, and brooding where their passionate nature is often turned inward, as they ruminate on a private torment or a difficult secret from their past. They tend to be lonely and alienated, and have views or values that conflict with those of the wider community. The name refers to the Romantic poet Lord Byron, who was active in the 19th century.	Lord Ruthven in 1819 book The Vampyre by John Polidori; Edmond Dantes in the 1844 book The Count of Monte Cristo by Alexandre Dumas; Heathcliff in the 1847 book Wuthering Heights by Emily Brontë; Rochester in the 1847 book Jane Eyre by Charlotte Brontë

== C ==
Character type	Description	Examples
Cajun	A French-speaking variant of the hillbilly. Speaks Creole with a twangy accent. Lives in the Louisiana bayou, plays a fiddle or squeezebox and is always barefoot. Eats gumbo and jambalaya made from shrimps, crawfish, hand-caught catfish, bullfrogs, snakes and alligators.	Desiree in Gator Bait; The trappers in Southern Comfort; Belizaire the Cajun; Beaux in Little Chenier; Ray in The Princess and the Frog; The pig sheriff in Samurai Jack; Leatherhead in Teenage Mutant Ninja Turtles; Remy "Gambit" LeBeau in the X-Men
Career criminal	Usually, a cunning thief who has a strange gait, slouched posture, and devious facial expression. Variants include the gentleman thief who is a master of disguise, and the professional burglar who usually wears black clothes, a domino mask and a prison stripe shirt	A. J. Raffles in E. W. Hornung's book series; Bernie Rhodenbarr in Lawrence Block's Burglar book series; Flynn Rider in the 2010 animated Disney film Tangled; Burglar Bill; The Goon; Yves the cat burglar in Dog City; Saul and Jasper Baddun in One Hundred and One Dalmatians; Wolf in Nu Pogodi
Cab driver	In British stories, may be a cockney from East London or in American stories, a street smart black American or Italian-American from New York. Wears a flat cap and leather coat. May be a vigilante or police informant with connections to the criminal underworld (or do odd jobs for them). In Victorian times he drove a hansom cab but in the present day he drives either a black London taxi or yellow Checker cab.	Sid James in Carry On Cabby; Travis Bickle in Taxi Driver; Benny in Who Framed Roger Rabbit; David Lonsdale in Heartbeat; In The Phantom, Al the cab driver becomes the Phantom's ally when he is paid with a diamond; Henry in Goodfellas is punished by his father for getting bad grades in school because he was secretly working as an underage cab driver; In The Magician's Nephew King Frank of Narnia was once a Hansom cab driver; In Goodbye Lenin East German cosmonaut Sigmund Jahn becomes a taxi driver after German reunification
Carnies, acrobats and clowns	Circus performers and other carnival employees include the daring trapeze artist, animal trainer who puts his head in the lion's mouth, circus clown, strong man in a leotard, beautiful female acrobat who is often married to the circus ringmaster, musicians, circus freaks, and the roustabout who is usually a black American. For villainous performers, see evil clown. The carnival attracts non-conformists and free spirits who prefer the freedom of life on the road. Some performers may have a dark and mysterious past.	Cleopatra and Hercules in Tod Browning's Freaks; The carnival con artist in Darkman; The black roustabouts in Dumbo; The Veiled Lodger; Weary Willie in The Clown and the Kids; Flip the clown in Little Nemo in Slumberland; Jodie Foster in Carny; Tyrone Power in Nightmare Alley
Cat girl	In anime, a young girl with the ears and tail of a house cat, or the ability to transform from a human into a cat. Male cat people also exist but they are less common. Has a cat-like personality that usually includes kleptomania and skill at climbing and acrobatics. Is often jealous of the female protagonist but is also fiercely loyal to her friends.	Cheetara in Thundercats; The Cat in Red Dwarf; Rebel Wilson as Jennyanydots in Cats; Michelle Pfeiffer as Catwoman in Batman Returns; The Puma Sisters in Dominion Tank Police; Shampoo in Ranma 1/2; Chibi-neko in Wata no Kunihoshi; Ichigo Monomiya in Tokyo Mew Mew; Merle in Escaflowne
Cat lady	An eccentric, reclusive, or unmarried woman—typically middle-aged or elderly—who lives alone with a large number of domestic cats as a substitute for human companionship. In comedy, she is often played as a harmless, doting oddball, whereas in horror and psychological drama, the archetype shifts toward a neglected, hoarding, or sinister recluse.	Eleanor Abernathy (The Crazy Cat Lady) in The Simpsons (1998–present); Arabella Figg in the Harry Potter series (1997–2007) by J. K. Rowling; Angela Martin (subverted workplace variation) in The Office (2005–2013); Maureen Ponderosa in It's Always Sunny in Philadelphia (2005–present)
Cavalry officer	A dashing, upper class ladies' man who is at the head of every cavalry charge. He wears an elegant dress uniform and carries a curved saber and pistol as sidearms. Is usually chivalrous and courteous, although sometimes he may be a cad or gambler. Is often a hussar from the Napoleonic Wars or US Cavalry from the Civil War era. During World War I many cavalry officers became flying aces.	John Wayne in She Wore a Yellow Ribbon; Errol Flynn in Charge of the Light Brigade; Lord John Rossendale in Sharpe's Waterloo; Harry Flashman in Flashman at the Charge; George Montgomery in Indian Uprising; Robert Shaw as Custer of the West; Tom Cruise in the Last Samurai
Cavemen/Cavewomen	This stock character, which is loosely based on Neolithic people, is typically portrayed as wearing shaggy animal hides, and capable of cave painting like behaviorally modern humans of the last glacial period. They are often shown as armed with rocks, cattle bone clubs, spears, or sticks with rocks tied to them, and are portrayed as unintelligent and only capable of grunting. Stereotypical cavewomen are similarly depicted, but sometimes with slimmer proportions and bones tied up in their hair. See also Jungle boy and Jungle girl.	Cavemen in Sir Arthur Conan Doyle's The Lost World (1912), fight with modern humans.; In How the First Letter Was Written and How the Alphabet was Made are two of Rudyard Kipling's Just So Stories (1902), cave people are depicted.; In Edgar Rice Burroughs' The Land That Time Forgot (1918), cave people are depicted.; A genre of cavemen films was developed in the 1910s, typified by D. W. Griffith's Man's Genesis (1912); these cave people characters cannot talk, and use sticks and stones for weapons.; In Captain Caveman and the Teen Angels (1977–1980), the titular caveman is hairy and carries wooden clubs.; Fred Flintstone in The Flintstones; Spear in Primal; Brendan Fraser as Encino Man; The comic strips B.C., Alley Oop, the Spanish comic franchise Mortadelo y Filemón, and occasionally The Far Side and Gogs incorrectly portray "cavemen" coexisting with dinosaurs.
Centaurs, satyrs and beastmen	Media based on Greek mythology often features half-man, half-animal creatures. Centaurs are skilled archers and noble warriors, satyrs love womanising, drinking wine and playing the pan pipes, and beastmen like the minotaur are evil, cannibalistic monsters or demons	Tumnus in The Chronicles of Narnia; Phil in Disney's Hercules; Bacchus' entourage in Disney's Fantasia; Firenze in Harry Potter; In The Golden Voyage of Sinbad the crew fight a monstrous centaur; The evil Chaos beastmen in Warhammer Fantasy; The pagan cultists in Dragnet wear goat leggings with hooves; Satan in The Cuphead Show!; The demons in the early levels of Altered Beast include undead goat-men
Chaperone	In historical works, this may be a respected older woman (less commonly an older man) who accompanies an unmarried teen girl or young woman in public, especially in settings where she might meet a man, such as in town or at parties or balls. Chaperones or duennas supervise the young woman to prevent her from getting into situations with rakes or "fortune-hunters" which would compromise her reputation and her marriageability, while also guiding her to a good match. The chaperone, who plays a blocking role in the blossoming romance of young lovers, may also be a Lady's companion or governess. In 20th and 21st century stories about young athletes, students, or performers, they may still have chaperone characters.	In Laura Moriarty's novel The Chaperone, when a 15-year-old dancer named Louise Brooks moves from Kansas to New York City in the early 1920s to go to dance school, a married woman in her mid-30s, Cora Carlisle, is assigned to protect her from the attention of flirtatious men.; In The Chaperone, the eponymous character is a getaway driver who leaves his life of crime and offers to chaperone his teenage daughter's field trip.; In the musical The Drowsy Chaperone, the eponymous character is an alcoholic woman who must look after a showgirl until her marriage to an oil tycoon.; In Robin Hood: Men in Tights, a chaperone, Broomhilde, prevents Robin Hood from kissing Maid Marian.
Chef	A big fat man with an apron and tall white chef's hat. Is usually French or Italian and speaks English with an accent and many culinary terms from their native language. May work in a glamorous restaurant or cruise ship, where they demonstrate virtuoso culinary skills. A more working-class cook may be behind a grill at a fast food restaurant or diner where they become a neighborhood fixture. The female equivalent will often work as a dinner lady in a school canteen.	Chef in South Park; Auguste Gusteau in Ratatouille; Jon Favreau in Chef; The cast of Dinnerladies; Gordon Ramsey in Hell's Kitchen; Jean-Pierre in Metalocalypse; Sam I Am in Green Eggs and Ham; Natasha in Who Is Killing the Great Chefs of Europe?; Bob in Bob's Burgers
Child prodigy / wunderkind	These characters are children or youths who can do challenging activities at an adult expert or professional level, such as chess, solo music performance, math, or physics. While they have genius-level IQs and exceptional memories, their cloistered life of intense study and discipline may make them less mature than their peers in social interactions, which may lead to awkwardness or conflicts. The German term Wunderkind (lit. 'wonder child') is used both for child prodigies and for young adults who achieve success and acclaim early in their adult careers (e.g., a young professor or music conductor).	In the 1935 science-fiction novel Odd John by Olaf Stapledon, John Wainwright is a superintelligent child whose exceptionality leads to conflict with the surrounding society.; In Young Sheldon, (prequel of The Big Bang Theory) Sheldon Cooper (played by Iain Armitage in Young Sheldon and Jim Parsons in The Big Bang Theory) has an IQ of 187 and an eidetic memory. He went to college when he was 11, started post graduate study at 14 at the California Institute of Technology (CalTech), and received his Ph.D. when he was 16.; In Doogie Howser, M.D., the title character is a child prodigy who has graduated from medical school and practices medicine.; In the television show Firefly, the character of River Tam (played by Summer Glau) is shown as a prodigy throughout the show, but in addition to her advanced intelligence and fighting skills, she has psychological issues.; In the 1988 novel Matilda by Roald Dahl, the eponymous Matilda Wormwood, is, according to BBC News, "a child prodigy who [is] unloved by her parents."; In the 1985 novel Ender's Game, Andrew "Ender" Wiggin, Bean, Petra Arkanian, and a group of also exceptionally talented child geniuses known as "Ender's jeesh" are recruited to unknowingly command fleets against an alien species to save the Earth.; In the series Artemis Fowl of books by Eoin Colfer, Artemis Fowl II starts as a 12-year-old child prodigy and ages throughout the series.; Billy Elliot (played by Jamie Bell) in Billy Elliot (2000), a dance prodigy.; Anakin Skywalker, in The Phantom Menace (1999), is a 9-year-old boy who is a brilliant pilot, technician, mechanic and engineer.; Harold Wormser, Revenge of the Nerds (1984). A twelve-year-old child prodigy in the first film, reluctantly went into college by his parents at first, but was accepted among his fellow misfits and was helpful in many of their capers against the rival campus jocks that bullied them in the film series.; The Royal Tenenbaums (2001) is about "a family composed of three child prodigies".; Mary Adler (played by Mckenna Grace) in Gifted (2017) is a mathematical prodigy whose late mother was a mathematician. She expressed an interest in solving the Navier-Stokes existence and smoothness problem which her mother was working on.; In The Sarah Jane Adventures, Sarah Jane's adopted son Luke is a child prodigy with the ability to remember numbers with over 20 digits after only a glance beforehand.
Chinese, Korean and East Asian people	In the early days of cinema, the stereotypical Chinese-American immigrant wore a coolie hat, pigtail and pronounced his Rs like Ls. By the 1920s, there were cunning yellow peril villains plotting to take over the world. In the 1930s Chinese people were represented more positively, often as hardworking, trustworthy, brave and intelligent in contrast to the treacherous, cruel Japanese. This continued in the late 20th century with Asians often portraying scientists and mathematicians. Koreans are often represented as K-pop singers. During the Red Scare of the 1950s and Vietnam War of the 1960s, Chinese, North Vietnamese and North Korean communists appeared as recurring villains. By the 21st century comedies made fun of the generation gap between the older generation of Asian-Americans and their children who had fully assimilated. See also Stereotypes of East Asians in the United States.	Charlie the cook from King Kong fits many of the older stereotypes as he talks in broken English and wears a queue.; Mr Magoo's assistant Cholly represents a transition between the early 20th century "yellowface" stereotypes and the more positive mid 20th century representation of the clever and resourceful Asian-American; Charlie Chan the detective is an example of the courageous, intelligent and trustworthy Chinese-American; Fu Manchu and the Mandarin are examples of the yellow peril supervillain; The cast of Crazy Rich Asians represent the 21st century generation gap within East Asian families; Kim Jun-Shik in My Way; Chen Lee in True Grit
Cholo/ Chicano	A Mexican-American criminal or thug, usually an ex-convict. In modern hood films they are the rivals of the black American crew and often deal cocaine. Has gang tattoos, ducktail haircut, drives a 1960s lowrider and wears baggy pants, white T-shirt, a rosary, and bandana in his prison gang's chosen colors. The female equivalent aka chola has thick black eyeliner, large hoop earrings and big hair often in a beehive hairstyle.	Danny Trejo as Machete; Chuco Avila in Boulevard Nights; The 21st Street Gang in Colors; Wolverine confronts a gang of cholo car thieves in the opening scenes of Logan; The thugs who harass Jim Carrey in Bruce Almighty; Sad Girl and Mousie in Mi Vida Loca
Chosen one	A character destined by prophecy to save the world, frequently possessed of unusual skills or abilities – frequently going through extreme hardship and sacrifice, including martyrdom — this then overlaps into the "Christ-like figure" below.	Anakin Skywalker in the Star Wars film series; Harry Potter in the Harry Potter book series by J. K. Rowling; Neo in The Matrix film series; Paul Metcalfe in Captain Scarlet and the Mysterons; Lucy the vault dweller in Fallout; Paul Atreides is the Kwisatz Haderach; Ellen Ripley in Aliens; Ash Williams in Army of Darkness; Konrad Arflane in The Ice Schooner
Christ figure/ Sacrificial lamb	A hero or major character who dies a martyr only to rise from the dead to fight evil, as in the story of Jesus – heavily overlapping with the "chosen one" character – this similarity may be intentional or not.	Aslan in The Chronicles of Narnia by C. S. Lewis; Gandalf in the 1957 book The Lord of the Rings by J. R. R. Tolkien; The Doctor in the Doctor Who television series; Spock in the Star Trek television and film series; Neo in The Matrix film series; Harry Potter in the Harry Potter book series by J. K. Rowling; Kenshiro in Fist of the North Star; Pildit in the Dreamstone
Chuck Cunningham	The opposite of the Cousin Oliver character: a secondary or minor character — usually a sibling of one of the main characters — who, when a breakout character emerges from a continuing series, quickly disappears without any notice nor explanation (retconned out of existence) and from then onward is never acknowledged as having ever existed. Named after the character in Happy Days, who disappeared shortly after Gavan O'Herlihy left the series after one season. Notably, this is distinct from the phenomenon of killing off a character or sending them away, in such cases the character is still recognized in the fictional universe but is no longer present.	Harold Hamgravy in the 1920s Thimble Theatre cartoon strip; Shermy in the 1950s Peanuts cartoon strip; Judy Winslow, played by Jaimee Foxworth, in the 1990s American television sitcom series Family Matters; Mandy Hampton, played by Moira Kelly, in the 2000s American television political drama series The West Wing — a lead character was dropped at the end of the 1st season without any further mention, so coining the term "going to Mandyville" for this; Sparky in the animated American television sitcom series The Fairly OddParents
Chūnibyō	A Japanese colloquial term and anime archetype describing an adolescent—typically around eighth grade—who suffers from grandiose delusions of possessing hidden supernatural powers, secret royal lineage, or dark magical knowledge. Played mostly for comedy or coming-of-age pathos, the character dresses dramatically, speaks in archaic or melodramatic phrases, and treats everyday life as an epic fantasy battle.	Rikka Takanashi in Love, Chunibyo & Other Delusions (2012); Megumin in KonoSuba (2016–present); Shun Kaidō in The Disastrous Life of Saiki K. (2016–2019); Fischl in Genshin Impact (2020)
Civil rights activist	The original "woke" hero fighting injustice such as slavery, misogyny, capitalism, totalitarianism, colonialism or apartheid. Variants include the abolitionist, trade unionist, feminist and socialist. May be a peaceful old clergymen, young upper-class woman or angry working-class man.	Ben Kingsley as Gandhi; Christopher Lee as Jinnah; Cynthia Erivo as Harriet Tubman; Raymond Massey as John Brown in Seven Angry Men; Sly Stallone in F.I.S.T.; Idris Elba in Mandela: Long Walk to Freedom; Pasha in Doctor Zhivago; Philip Glenister in Sharpe's Justice
Clergyman	A trusted counsellor called upon to perform weddings and funerals involving the protagonists. Is fond of long fire and brimstone sermons. Often wears spectacles, black clothing and a clerical collar. Variants include the preacher, Catholic priest, missionary, Jewish rabbi and mullah. Sometimes the priest has a side job as a private dick. A variant is the immoral clergyman. In Victorian and early 20th century literature, a defrocked clergyman of dubious moral character performs forced or sham marriages for the benefit of the villain. In some cases he is criminal con man who uses a preacher disguise to gain the trust of his victims. Another example is the Whiskey Priest.	Marryin' Sam in Lil Abner; Father Chisholm in The Keys to the Kingdom; Preacher Seth in Damnation; Friar Tuck in The Adventures of Robin Hood; Father Ted; Bishop Cuthbert Hever in All Gas and Gaiters; Reverend Timothy Farthing in Dad's Army; Reverend Lovejoy in The Simpsons; Father Brown; Cadfael; Preacher Harry Powell from The Night of the Hunter; Krusty the Klown's father Herschel Krustovsky in The Simpsons; Lanigan's Rabbi; The Mullah in East Is East; Laurence Olivier as the Mad Mahdi in Khartoum
Cloudcuckoolander/Daydreamer	A carefree, cheery and childlike character with a loose grip on reality. Despite their lazy or eccentric appearance they possess the intellect, talent or willpower to make their impossible dreams reality. May be a hippie high on psychedelic drugs, an idiot savant or a magical girl.	Rufus in The Dreamstone; Princess Uni-Kitty in the Lego Movie; Klunk in Dastardly and Muttley in their Flying Machines; Donald Sutherland as Oddball in Kelly's Heroes; Harpo Marx; Rocket Raccoon in Guardians of the Galaxy; Ellie the mammoth in Ice Age 2; Yakko, Wakko and Dot in Animaniacs; Bloo in Foster's Home for Imaginary Friends; Edward in Cowboy Bebop; Orihime in Bleach
Coachman/ busman/ chauffeur	May drive an omnibus or Old West stagecoach, a nobleman's private carriage or a Brass Era car such as a Silver Ghost. In modern times, he will drive a diesel powered motor omnibus which may be a red double decker bus or a yellow school bus. In smaller or impoverished aristocratic households the coachman frequently doubles as a butler. If his employer is a cad, the coachman will often come from the criminal class	Andy Devine in Stagecoach; The evil coachman in Disney's Pinocchio who takes the boys to Pleasure Island; Bus driver Stan Butler in On The Buses; School bus driver Otto Mann in the Simpsons; Aloysius Parker in Thunderbirds Are Go; Tom Branson in Downton Abbey; The pimp Stan Shaw's British chauffeur in TNT Jackson; Lucrezia Moore's driver in The Fantastic Flying Journey; Eric Sykes as Courtney in those Magnificent Men in Their Flying Machines; The Green Hornet's driver and bodyguard Kato
Cobbler	A skilled, hardworking leather worker who toils at his workbench. From his role in his cobbler's shop, he comes to know everyone in town. Is often childless. Despite his poverty he is generous to strangers and may receive a reward for assisting a supernatural benefactor.	Papa Panov; Adam Sandler as The Cobbler; The old man who makes sandals for the King with Dirty Feet; The Shoemaker and the Elves; The Heath Cobblers; Lapitch the Little Shoemaker; The Cunning Shoemaker
College widow	An unmarried woman in a college town who dates different college men every year, and is "widowed" each year when they graduate. The college widow was common in American books and films in the first half of the twentieth century, and largely disappeared with the spread of co-educational schools.	Jane Witherspoon in The College Widow (1904); Flavia Peterson in Dad's College Widow (1916); Connie Bailey in Horse Feathers (1932); Joan Simpkins in Freshman Love (1936)
Combat medic	A military medical specialist serving on the front lines who acts as the moral conscience or compassionate heart of a combat unit. Often depicted as a pacifist, conscientious objector, or deeply spiritual figure, the combat medic risks their life under heavy fire to save wounded comrades while frequently struggling with the psychological toll of war.	Benjamin Franklin "Hawkeye" Pierce in M*A*S*H (1968) and its television adaptation (1972–1983); Eugene "Doc" Roe in Band of Brothers (2001); Irwin Wade in Saving Private Ryan (1998); Desmond Doss as portrayed in Hacksaw Ridge (2016); Tommy "Doc" Conlon in Platoon (1986)
Competent man	A character who exhibits a very wide range of abilities and knowledge, making him a form of polymath. The competent man, more often than not, is written without explaining how he achieved his wide range of skills and abilities. John W. Campbell set out the idea of "competent man" who can deal with any challenges. Despite the use of "man" in the name, there are female examples. Critics may view some examples of this stock character to be too perfect or competent (or competent in a way that is not supported by the story), and they may pejoratively label them as a "Mary Sue/ Marty Stu" stock character. While not the first to use such a character type, the heroes and heroines of Robert A. Heinlein's fiction generally have a wide range of abilities and so this character may be called a "Heinleinian hero".	Lazarus Long and Jubal Harshaw in books by Robert A. Heinlein; British secret agent James Bond can shoot any handgun or rifle and pilot a boat, submarine, helicopter, or plane and he also knows multiple languages, reads scientific papers, and knows upper class social etiquette for fine dining.; Secret agent Angus MacGyver has a genius-level intellect, proficiency in multiple languages, superb engineering skills, excellent knowledge of applied physics, military training in bomb disposal. He can use everyday materials to create DIY methods to escape or solve problems.; Doctor Who, especially his third incarnation; Indiana Jones is an archaeologist, explorer, spy, marksman and pilot; Lara Croft in Tomb Raider is a female example; Ethan Hunt in the Mission: Impossible film series; Flash Gordon is a footballer, astronaut, pilot and freedom fighter; Bruce Wayne is a billionaire corporate executive, amateur detective, black belt and vigilante; Danger Mouse, the superhero of the mouse world
Companion animal/Familiar	Traditionally, the classic hero was accompanied by his horse and dog. In a fantasy setting, the hero or heroine may be aided by a lion, bird, griffin, unicorn or winged horse. The classic witch shares her house with a black cat familiar (see also cat lady).	Charlie Brown's dog Snoopy; Dorothy Gale's dog Toto; Stacy Keach's pet dingo in Road Games; He-Man's tiger Battle Cat; The Lone Ranger's horse Silver; Aragorn's horse Brego; Pegasus in Clash of the Titans; The Last Unicorn; Fawkes the Phoenix in Harry Potter; Clever house cats like Puss in Boots and Dick Whittington's Cat help their masters become wealthy and successful; Some of the best-known witches' familiars are Sabrina Spellman's cat Salem, Ron Weasley's rat Scabbers and Lyra Belacqua's stoat Pan
Con artist/ spiv	A person who uses charisma and impersonation to trick people out of money. The con artist gains the trust of their victim (their "mark") and then steals from them or swindles them. Is often a deceitful used car salesman who sells "lemons" or a spiv who sells fake Rolexes or stolen goods.	Artful Dodger in the 1838 book Oliver Twist by Charles Dickens; Del Boy in 1980s BBC television sitcom series Only Fools and Horses; The King and the Duke in the book series of Tom Sawyer and Huckleberry Finn by Mark Twain; Honest John in Pinocchio; Reynard the Fox; Claude Greengrass, Aidensfield's lovable rogue; Sylvester McBean in The Sneetches by Dr. Seuss; The Wizard of Oz; Phil Silvers as Sgt. Bilko; Lyle Lanley who proposes the Springfield Monorail in The Simpsons; Private Walker in Dad's Army; Matilda's father; Professor Browne in Bedknobs and Broomsticks; Uncle Marvel in Shazam!; Flash Harry in St. Trinians
Construction worker/Tradesman	A blue collar worker who could be a plumber, bricklayer, electrician or carpenter. In British stories, often talks with a working class English accent, wears a hard hat and overalls even on his day off, and has a large moustache.	Burnout in The Lampies; Werner and his friends in Werner – Beinhart!; Super Mario Bros are Italian-American plumbers; Mr Fixit in Busy Town by Richard Scarry; Emmet Brickowski in The Lego Movie; Bob in Bob the Builder; Fix-It Felix in Wreck-It Ralph
Constable	The old fashioned policeman who walked his beat every day was trusted by the whole neighbourhood. He had a strong sense of fair play, upheld the law and took satisfaction in sending the suspects to jail but was not above using excessive force on criminals or physically disciplining juvenile delinquents. If the main character is a naughty kid, the constable is often on the receiving end of his practical jokes. The Canadian equivalent is the Mountie.	Dixon of Dock Green; Constables Fox and Badger in Tufty; PC Tony Stamp in The Bill; PC Selby in Postman Pat; PC Pinkerton; The fat policeman in Quick & Flupke; Officer Saito in Mitsuboshi Colors; Dudley Do-Right; Strait McCool in Fugget About It
Conscience	A character, often supernatural or fable-like, who provides moral guidance and advice to the protagonist. This may be a "shoulder angel" (or "shoulder devil"), a character visible only to the protagonist who whispers advice to them.	Jiminy Cricket in the 1883 book Pinocchio by Carlo Collodi; Angel Clarence in the 1947 film It's a Wonderful Life; Old Georgie, played by Hugo Weaving, gives advice to Zachry (Tom Hanks) in the 2012 film Cloud Atlas; Timothy Mouse in Dumbo
Contender	A competitive, scrappy underdog who is driven to keep trying to win despite obstacles and poor odds.	Rocky Balboa in the Rocky film series; Lightning McQueen in the Cars film series from Pixar Animation Studios; Daniel LaRusso in The Karate Kid film series; Robert De Niro in Raging Bull; Jimmy Wang-Yu as the One-Armed Boxer; Bruce Lee in Enter the Dragon
Convict/ insane asylum inmate	A dangerous criminal doing time in the county jail or penal colony. Usually wears a black and white striped prison uniform or an orange jumpsuit if he is being moved between jails. A similar character is the criminally insane patient institutionalised at the mental hospital who is often a serial killer. The ex-con who escapes or is released after serving his sentence might return to a life of crime, or try to rebuild his life despite society's prejudices.	Hannibal Lecter in The Silence of the Lambs; The Jackal in 13 Ghosts; Arkham Asylum patients in the Batman comics, such as The Joker; Ben Kingsley in Stonehearst Asylum; Whiplash in Iron Man 2; Abel Magwitch in Great Expectations; Mad Dog Morgan; Steve McQueen as Papillon; Rico Dredd in Judge Dredd; Ray Winstone in Scum; The Dirty Dozen; Danny Trejo in Con-Air; Drax the Destroyer in Guardians of the Galaxy; Burt Reynolds in The Longest Yard
Corrupt cop/Dirty cop	A law enforcement officer who betrays their vows to uphold the law and who commits crimes for personal gain, such as taking bribes or selling illegal drugs, sometimes directly working for the gangsters they are supposed to be arresting. The "dirty cop" differs from the "cowboy cop" who bends the rules to catch the bad guys because the corrupt officer breaks the rules for personal profit. A dirty cop often lives a luxurious lifestyle far beyond what their police paycheck could cover, due to bribes and they will betray fellow officers and use them as pawns in their corrupt activities. There are two types: obviously dirty cops who make little or no attempt to conceal their illegal activities, and "wolves in sheep's clothing" who may be outwardly respectable, decorated officers who have a hidden drug addiction or criminal enterprise.	In the film American Gangster (2007), Detective Trupo (Josh Brolin) resells illegal narcotics that he confiscates and extorts a drug kingpin.; In the movies Bad Lieutenant (1992) and Bad Lieutenant: Port of Call New Orleans (2009), a corrupt cop (Harvey Keitel and Nicolas Cage, respectively) engages in numerous illegal vices and uses criminal activities to pay his gambling debts and buy drugs.; In Internal Affairs (1990) police officer Dennis Peck (Richard Gere) pretends to be a good cop to throw suspicion away from his murderous schemes.; In Cop Land (1997), police lieutenant Ray Donlan (Harvey Keitel) is the head of a group of corrupt cops who run a drug trafficking scheme.; In James Ellroy's L.A. Confidential, Police Captain Dudley Smith (James Cromwell) is an outwardly respected cop who is secretly corrupt and trying to take over the local Los Angeles mob.; In Leon: The Professional (1994) DEA agent Norman Stansfield (Gary Oldman) runs an anti-drug squad, but he secretly sells drugs that he confiscates and ruthlessly kills any witnesses.
Corydon	A Corydon is a stock character for a herdsman in ancient Greek pastoral poems and fables and in much later European literature. The Corydon character may be portrayed as amorous or cowardly.	A Corydon character is in the fourth Idyll of the Syracusan poet Theocritus (c.300 – c.250 BCE); A goatherd character named Corydon who is in love with another man, Alexis, in the second of Virgil's Eclogues; A Corydon character is in Ecologues by Calpurnius Siculus, who may be an author surrogate; Daphnis, the goatherd protagonist of the 2nd century CE Greek pastoral romance novel Daphnis and Chloe by Longus; A cowardly shepherd named Corydon, who is afraid to help Pastorell when she is being pursued by a tiger, in Book VI, Canto X of The Faerie Queen by Edmund Spenser
Cousin Oliver	A young child who joins the cast of an ongoing series (usually a sitcom) after the previous younger characters have grown older and can no longer provide the comic plot lines they used to as child actors. Named after a character added in the final episodes of The Brady Bunch, after the youngest Brady stepsiblings had grown into preteens.	Nicky and Alex Katsopolis in Full House television series; Ricky Segall in The Partridge Family television series; Scrappy-Doo in Scooby-Doo television series. Scrappy-Doo was notably both a Cousin Oliver and a Chuck Cunningham, in that he was retconned out of the Scooby-Doo franchise nine years after his introduction.; Dawn Summers, played by Michelle Trachtenberg, the younger sister of Buffy the Vampire Slayer created in 2000's, season 5
Corporate executive/Capitalist	The chairman or manager of a large company. May be a paternalistic old man who rose from rags to riches and treats his employees well, a distant figurehead indifferent to the needs of his workers, or a scheming sociopath who wants to take over the company or (if he is already CEO) extract resources from a protected local landmark.	Mr. Willmake in Bertha; Fezziwig in A Christmas Carol; Bigweld in Robots; Mr. Krabs in SpongeBob SquarePants; The Old Man in RoboCop; John Houseman in Rollerball; Malcolm McDowell in Tank Girl; Catbert in Dilbert; Vandercave in The Flintstones; The Once-ler in The Lorax; Trade Federation Viceroy Nute Gunray and Techno Union boss Wat Tambor in Star Wars; Cyril Sneer in The Raccoons
Creepy/evil kid	A villain that takes the form of a small kid but shows disturbing, unchildlike behaviour. May be a sociopath, psychic or possessed by a demon.	Anthony in It's A Good Life; Linda Blair in The Exorcist; Kagami in Wrath of the Ninja; Sid in Toy Story; Damien in The Omen; The Red Death in ABC Warriors; The Judge Child in Judge Dredd; Isaac in Children of the Corn
Crime boss	The mafia godfather is the main villain in gangster films who is involved in racketeering and contract killings. Is usually Italian, Jewish or Irish. Will demand protection money from local businesses and throw informers into the river encased in concrete but also has a charitable side and will perform favors to those under his protection.	Marlon Brando as The Godfather; Al Capone in Boardwalk Empire; Fat Sam in Bugsy Malone; Jack Spot in Once Upon a Time in London; Mickey Cohen in Gangster Squad; Luca Changretta in Peaky Blinders; Don Nunzio in The Black Hand; Bill the Butcher and Priest Vallon in Gangs of New York
Cultured villain	This stock character is intelligent, highly educated (either at a university or by being an autodidact), knowledgeable about arts, culture and music, and has impeccable manners and fancy clothing. Despite this sophisticated and refined presentation, they are immoral villains who plan and execute reprehensible crimes.	James Bond series villains are often refined, cultured, and murderous. For example, Dr. No loves fine paintings; Auric Goldfinger is into interior design and decor; Ernst Stavro Blofeld is cultured and treasures his aristocratic title; and Stromberg loves interior design, architecture and Bach.; In The Silence of the Lambs, Hannibal Lecter is well-educated, making references in conversation to Shakespeare and Marcus Aurelius, and he loves classical music and fine wines. Despite this seeming refinement, he is a cannibalistic serial killer.; Hans Gruber from Die Hard appears to be a well-educated, fashionably dressed, multilingual businessman. In fact, he is a ruthless heist planner and leader who executes a hostage in cold blood.; Magneto in Ultimate X-Men (2001), has a deep appreciation for great works of art, which he tries to steal and hoard, but at the same time, he is planning to destroy all of the people on Earth.; The wealthy investment banker Patrick Bateman from American Psycho has refined tastes in designer clothing, hi-fi systems, and fine dining, but this hides his secret life as a cannibalistic serial killer.; The High Evolutionary in Guardians of the Galaxy Vol. 3 appears to be a kind, enlightened being who loves art and music, but this hides his true nature: someone willing to kill an entire world that he feels is imperfect.; In Apocalypse Now, Colonel Kurtz is a well-spoken Harvard graduate who loves poetry and literature. Despite his eloquent persona, he is leading a private army in unauthorized, murderous attacks.
Cursed soldier/Japanese holdout	The last survivor from a defeated military faction who fights a one-man insurgency against the occupier long after the peace treaty has been signed. May be unaware that the war is over or too stubborn to surrender. Sometimes becomes a smuggler, bandit or pirate. Is often a Polish resistance fighter, Japanese soldier or Confederate from the Civil War era.	Maciek in Ashes and Diamonds; The two Japanese soldiers in The Last Flight of Noah's Ark; Hiroo Onoda in Onoda: 10,000 Nights in the Jungle; Kanan Jarrus, a Jedi who survived Order 66 in Star Wars: Rebels; The Wolverines in Red Dawn; Sly Stallone in Rambo II; Mal Reynolds and the Browncoats in Firefly; Captain Kane of Battlestar Pegasus; Pitt Mackeson in Ride with the Devil; Clint Eastwood as The Outlaw Josey Wales
Curmudgeon/Malcontent/Misanthrope	An ancient, stereotyped character, who is usually an unhappy outsider, but always dissatisfied, observed in Classical theatre that went on to often appear in early modern drama. They observe and comment on the action, and are sometimes metafictionally aware that they are in a play. Usually, but not always, portrayed as a male middle-aged or elderly who outwardly is bitter, argumentative, and politically incorrect. The curmudgeon usually has more sympathetic traits that are revealed over the course of a work of fiction. See also: Angry black woman See also: Angry white male	Knemon, the eponymous protagonist in the Ancient Greek comedy of 316 BCE Dyskolos ("The Curmudgeon" / "The Misanthrope") by Menander; Hamlet in the 1600 eponymous play by William Shakespeare; Malevole in the 1603 play The Malcontent by John Marston; Vindice in the 1606 play The Revenger's Tragedy by Thomas Middleton (disputed); Bosola in the 1612 play The Duchess of Malfi by John Webster*eponymous protagonist in the 1666 comedy of manners The Misanthrope by Molière in a reworking of Menander's Dyskolos; The Grinch in the 1957 book How the Grinch Stole Christmas! by Dr Seuss; Alf Garnett, played by Warren Mitchell in a career-defining role from the 1960s to the 1980s, in the BBC television sitcom series Till Death Us Do Part and the follow-on series Till Death... and In Sickness and in Health; Daisy Werthan, played by Jessica Tandy, in the 1989 film Driving Miss Daisy; Arthur the caterpillar in Willo the Wisp; The main character in The Outbursts of Everett True
Cyborg	A cyborg is a living organism that has restored function or enhanced abilities due to the integration of some artificial component or technology that relies on feedback such as: prostheses, artificial organs, implants or, in some cases, wearable technology. A cyborg has both organic and biomechatronic body parts which may give it enhanced abilities.	Tin Woodman in the L. Frank Baum's novel The Wonderful Wizard of Oz (1900); Anakin Skywalker/Darth Vader from the Star Wars series (1977); T-800 from the film The Terminator (1984); Alex Murphy / RoboCop from the RoboCop series; Cyborg from DC Comics; Machine Head from Redline

== D ==
Character type	Description	Examples
Damsel in distress	A beautiful young lady who needs to be rescued from kidnapping or other peril by a brave hero. Critics have linked the helplessness of these stock characters to societal views that women as a group need to be taken protected by men. Throughout the history of the trope, the role of the woman as the victim in need of a male savior has remained constant, but her attackers have changed to suit the tastes and collective fears of the period. In fairy tales, a princess needs to be rescued from evil tyrants or monsters, traditionally from dragons. In contemporary 20th and 21st century films, the threat is more likely to come from criminals or terrorists.	Disney princesses of the mid-20th century; Daphne Blake in the animated American television sitcom series Scooby-Doo; Andromeda from in the 1981 film Clash of the Titans; Princess Peach in the Super Mario video-game series; Princess Zelda in The Legend of Zelda video-game series; Princess Daphne in Dragon's Lair; Anne Darrow in King Kong; Hestia in Fire Maidens from Outer Space; Alta in Forbidden Planet; Dale Arden in Flash Gordon; Pauline in The Perils of Pauline
Dancer/ ice skater/ stripper	An attractive, graceful performer who gains the admiration of the judges and the audience. May be a ballerina, tap dancer, ballroom dancer, figure skater or contemporary dancer specialising in tango, jive dancing or breakdancing. In exploitation films she may be forced to work in a strip club or burlesque house.	Fred Astaire in Top Hat; Scott Hastings in Strictly Ballroom; Angelina Ballerina; Patrick Swayze in Dirty Dancing; Kevin Bacon in Footloose; Jennifer Beals in Flashdance; Special K in Breakin'; Magic Mike; Kay Lenz in Stripped to Kill; Bette Midler as Gypsy; Sonja Henie in My Lucky Star; Margot Robbie in I, Tonya; Will Ferrell in Blades of Glory
Dandy	A good-looking, well-off, foppish young man, more interested in fashion and leisure than business and politics, who is prominent in Regency period and Victorian literature of English and French languages. Affluent, flamboyant dandies of the mid-nineteenth century who spend their days strolling the boulevards may also be called flâneurs. In western films a dandy is known as a dude and may be a gambler from the eastern cities or a deadly gunslinger.	Henry Pelham in the 1828 book Pelham: or, The Adventures of a Gentleman by Edward Bulwer-Lytton; Henri de Marsay in the 1835 novella La Fille aux yeux d'or (English: "The Girl with the Golden Eyes") by Honoré de Balzac; Dorian Gray in Oscar Wilde's titular book; Sir Percival Blakeney in The Scarlet Pimpernel book series by Baroness Orczy; Tyrone Power in The Mark of Zorro; Allan in Escaflowne; Doc Holliday in Tombstone; Bret Maverick
Dandere	A quiet, shy, and socially anxious character archetype in anime and manga who struggles to express themselves around others. Often mistaken for being cold or aloof, the character becomes warm, talkative, and deeply affectionate once they feel safe with a trusted friend or romantic partner.	Hinata Hyuga in Naruto (1999–2014); Sawako Kuronuma in Kimi ni Todoke (2006–2017); Shoko Komi in Komi Can't Communicate (2016–present); Mio Akiyama in K-On! (2007–2010)
Daredevil/stuntman	A risk-taking hero who breaks speed records and performs death-defying stunts with a motorcycle or biplane. In Western films he is a steer rider at rodeos. Often has an evil, boastful rival who tries to steal the limelight or compete for the affections of his love interest.	Harold Lloyd in Safety Last!; Lee Majors as The Fall Guy; Luke Perry in 8 Seconds; The Stunt Dawgs; Anthony Hopkins in The World's Fastest Indian; Leonardo Dicaprio as Howard Hughes in The Aviator; Robert Redford as the Great Waldo Pepper; The Incredible Crash Dummies; Evel Knievel in Viva Knievel!; Lee Pace as the Black Bandit in The Fall
Dark lady	A beautiful and aristocratic woman whose dark, mysterious, and inscrutable personality makes her seem alluring. She could be an antagonistic character if her temperament is malicious or cruel. Her darkness is either literally, in the sense she has a colored skin, or in a metaphorical sense, in that she is a tragic, doomed figure. This stock character in the United States is pejoratively sometimes called the tragic mulatto, otherwise the Hispanic or Latin lady / lover stereotype. Some scholars have called this – and the male equivalent, Don Juan — the only two positive Hispanic stock characters.	Lady Macbeth in William Shakespeare's tragic history play Macbeth; Dolores Del Rio played various stereotyped roles in films such as Flying Down to Rio (1933) and In Caliente (1936); Miss Trunchbull in the comic book Matilda by Roald Dahl; Annie Wilkes in the book Misery by Stephen King; Dark Princess in Rainbow Brite; Gedren in Red Sonja; Bavmorda in Willow; Evil-Lyn in Masters of the Universe; Tina Turner in Mad Max 3; The Queen in Snow White
Dark Lord	An evil and all-powerful sorcerer, who is though, often wounded, still powerful enough to defile the land. The character may just be a symbol of evil with little backstory or explanation of motivation, except for solely wanting power and dominion over the world – a Devil archetype.	Morgoth, and then later his lieutenant Sauron, first epitomised this character in the series of books of Middle-earth by J.R.R. Tolkien; The Emperor Palpatine and Darth Vader in the film series Star Wars; Lord Foul / a-Jeroth of the Seven Hells in The Chronicles of Thomas Covenant book series by Stephen R. Donaldson; Lord Voldemort in the Harry Potter book series by J.K. Rowling; Thanos in the Marvel Comics universe
Dastardly Whiplash	A classic villain archetype from the silent film era, who will tie a maiden to train tracks or burn down an orphanage as part of their schemes, all while twirling their long handlebar moustache. They have over-the-top personalities. Seeks to either seduce the young heroine, or swindle her out of her inheritance.	Simon Legree in the book Uncle Tom's Cabin by Harriet Beecher Stowe; Dick Dastardly in the Wacky Races and the spin-off Dastardly and Muttley in their Flying Machines Hanna-Barbera animated television series; Terry-Thomas as Sir Percy Ware-Armitage in Those Magnificent Men in Their Flying Machines; The cad Woodley and the blackmailer Charles Augustus Milverton in The Adventures of Sherlock Holmes; Jack Lemmon as Professor Fate in The Great Race; Relentless Rudolph in Hairbreadth Harry; Philip the Fiend in No! No! A Thousand Times No!
Deckhand/sailor	An enlisted sailor under the command of a sea captain on a warship or merchant ship. The crew usually includes a new recruit known as a landsman, an experienced able seaman, a young cabin boy, and petty officers with specialised skills such as ship's cook, carpenter or boatswain	Willie and Barnabas in Captain Pugwash; Ishmael in Moby Dick; Thomas Blanky in The Terror; Private Frazer in Dad's Army; The Mate of the Vital Spark; Dana in Two Years Before the Mast; Nancy and Peggy Blackett in Swallows and Amazons; Popeye; The titular character of Gilligan's Island; Edmond, The Count of Monte Cristo; Cori the Cabin Boy; Reepicheep in The Voyage of the Dawn Treader; John Blackthorne in Shogun; Ioz in The Pirates of Dark Water; Private Snafu's brother Seaman Tarfu
Dictator/Tyrant	The autocratic leader of a fascist, totalitarian or Stalinist nation who wears an elaborate uniform and medals. If he rules a banana republic he may be a general who did a military coup, a corrupt tyrant who steals from his people and lives a life of luxury, or he may work for the narcoterrorist drug cartels. Can be a serious villain or a ridiculous buffoon.	Idi Amin in Raid on Entebbe; Charlie Chaplin as Adenoid Hynkel in The Great Dictator; Fearless Leader in Rocky and Bullwinkle; Sacha Baron Cohen as The Dictator; Big Brother in 1984; General Tapioca in Tintin and the Picaros; Supreme Chancellor Palpatine in Revenge of the Sith; Jack in Lord of the Flies; Colonel Fakkadi in Transformers; Immortan Joe in Furiosa
Dinosaur	A large prehistoric reptile with scales, claws and sharp teeth. May be a gentle giant or a fierce apex predator. In kids' films, the main character may have a dinosaur as a companion animal and the dinosaur may be able to talk.	Gertie the Dinosaur; Godzilla; Grimlock in Transformers; Rex in Toy Story; Earl Sneed Sinclair; Chris Pratt's trained velociraptors in Jurassic World; Littlefoot in The Land Before Time; The mokele-mbembe in Baby: Secret of the Lost Legend; The Valley of Gwangi; Fang in Primal; Old One-Eye in Flesh
Disabled person	The disabled person has long been an underdog protagonist, especially in dramas, horror and comedy movies. They may be a blind man whose other senses are heightened, a wheelchair user with hidden academic or athletic abilities, or a mentally retarded person who is actually a genius.	Dustin Hoffman in Rain Man; Duddits in Dreamcatcher; Timmy in South Park; Sam Shore in Stingray relies on his wheelchair desk; Patrick Magee as the old blind man in Tales From the Crypt; Professor Hawk in Dexter's Laboratory; Eddie Redmayne as Stephen Hawking in The Theory of Everything; Long John Silver in Treasure Island; Zatoichi the blind ronin
Disc jockey/Radio operator/telegraphist	A person who works in communications. May be a radio show presenter, military communications officer, railway signalman or ham radio enthusiast. For DJs and radio presenters, their strength is their charisma, appealing voices, and knowledge of music. For radio operators and telegraphists, their strength is coolness under pressure as they help respond to an emergency.	Soundwave in Transformers; Lt. Green in Captain Scarlet and the Mysterons; Craig Kelly in Titanic; Tintin in Land of Black Gold; Wolfman Jack in American Graffiti; Jack Black as Dr. Demento in Weird: The Al Yankovic Story
Disfigured villain	This stock character has a significant, visible disability or injury, such as a missing body part, a disfigured face, or a hunched back, which leads other characters to fear them. Some disabled villains use a wheelchair or prosthetic devices. In some stories, the pain and loss caused by the disfigurement causes the character to turn to the dark side. The use of this stock character has been criticized by disability advocacy organizations as an offensive negative stereotype, as it suggests that people with disabilities have a predisposition to be evil.	Various villains in James Bond films have disfigurement or disabilities: Dr. No has no hands and uses steel pincer-style prosthetics, Ernst Blofeld has scars, Hugo Drax has facial disfigurement, and Raoul Silva has a jaw injury and uses facial prosthetics.; Ephialtes, the hunchback in 300 has his offer to serve King Leonidas turned down, leading him to betray his people to the Persian forces.; Azog the Defiler from The Hobbit film trilogy lost his arm in battle and replaced it with a metal spike.; The crime boss in Ong-Bak is a wheelchair user with a throat injury.; In Star Wars, the villain Darth Vader got severe burns which required him to wear a mask and life support suit.; In Shakespeare's play Richard III, the titular character has a hunched back and a withered arm.; The DC Comics villain Two-Face was originally a man named Harvey Dent who had his face disfigured by acid.
Diva/Prima donna	These stock characters depict celebrated performing artists such as singers or actresses who have impressive skills but demanding, difficult personalities. The two terms describe a similar character, although "Diva" may have more positive connotations and "Prima Donna" tends to be associated with artists who have a "queen bee" attitude, and who make huge demands for special treatment and have heated debates with the director on artistic issues. They are hostile to rivals and ignore the fans and hoi polloi who wait outside their luxurious dressing rooms. While mainly associated with performing arts, the terms may also be applied to successful people and leaders in other fields. While both terms have female origins, they can be applied to women or men.	In The Phantom of the Opera, Carlotta, who sings a song called "Prima Donna", is upset over getting a minor performing role in a production.; In Birdman or (The Unexpected Virtue of Ignorance), the lead performer Mike Shiner resists taking instructions from the Director and has a temper tantrum.; In Sunset Boulevard, Norma Desmond is an aging former movie star who lives in a fantasy world and dreams that fans are still anxiously awaiting her next big film.; In Glee, Rachel is one of the best singers in her school Glee Club, but she starts to think she is as good as top professionals and she becomes conceited and egotistical.; In The Muppets, Miss Piggy craves attention, uses French phrases to impress people and dreams of superstardom.; In Spamalot, the Lady of the Lake is portrayed as a needy diva. She sings "The Diva's Lament", in which she bemoans her insufficient time in starring roles.
Diver/submariner	A brave adventurer who explores the seabed looking for buried treasure. Usually wears a diving suit with brass helmet or scuba diving breathing apparatus and flippers. Often travels in a high-tech submarine. In fantasy, they may have a merperson or aquatic creature such as a sea lion or dolphin as a companion. In thrillers and war films, divers do do underwater infiltration, reconnaissance or sabotage; submariners command a military submarine armed with torpedoes.	Captain Nemo in 20,000 Leagues Under the Sea; Nadia in Nadia: Secret of Blue Water; Troy Tempest in Stingray; Diver Dan; The supervillain Captain Death in Shazam!; The Nazi U-Boat crew in Das Boot; The Beatles in their Yellow Submarine; Black Manta in Aquaman and the Lost Kingdom; Sandy Ricks in Flipper; Jesse in Free Willy
Dojikko (Clumsy girl)	A sweet-natured, well-meaning young female character in anime and manga who is chronically prone to tripping, dropping objects, and making endearing everyday blunders. Rather than causing annoyance, her earnest effort and innocent clumsiness evoke sympathy and protective affection from surrounding characters.	Usagi Tsukino in Sailor Moon (1991–1997); Mikuru Asahina in Haruhi Suzumiya (2003–present); Honoka Kōsaka in Love Live! School Idol Project (2013–2014); Kobeni Higashiyama (anxious combat variation) in Chainsaw Man (2018–present)
Donor	A supernatural being in fairy tales and fantasy literature who helps the protagonist or tests them. The fairy godmother is a classic example in fairy tales.	The Fairy Godmother in the Cinderella tale by Charles Perrault; The Genie in the Aladdin tale, as well as pantomimes and films; Cosmo and Wanda in the animated American television series The Fairly OddParents; Flora, Fauna and Merryweather in Disney's Sleeping Beauty; Baba Yaga in The Death of Koschei the Deathless; Rumpelstiltskin; Haku in Spirited Away
Dog catcher/pest exterminator	A villainous character employed by the dog pound who rounds up stray dogs and cats. Often has a toothbrush moustache. Their key traits are their single-minded determination to capture their prey and their lack of empathy for animals. A closely related character is the pest controller called in by the homeowner to eradicate an infestation of mice, rats or cockroaches.	Herman in Rude Dog and the Dweebs; The main villain of Lady and the Tramp; A dog catcher is the archenemy of Stymie from Our Gang; In Heart of a Dog Sharik the dog is employed as an animal control officer; In Nutty comics, Basil Crumb is a dogcatcher who is always outwitted by a gang of strays called the Wild Rovers; The Exterminator in Itsy Bitsy Spider; Momoko in Twilight of the Cockroaches; Butch in Tom and Jerry; Cesar in Mouse Hunt
Domestic servant (Black)	Black people in American books and films are often depicted as domestic servants, due to the extensive history of slavery. The common stereotypical depiction of these roles has little or no characterization or character development beyond the functionary role. The pejorative Mammy stereotype is a subcategory.	Beulah, the titular lead in the novel by Augusta Wilson; Mammy, played by Oscar-winning Hattie McDaniel; Pork, played by Oscar Polk; and Prissy, played by Butterfly McQueen in the 1939 film Gone with the Wind; Hoke Colburn, played by Morgan Freeman, and Idella, played by Esther Rolle, in the 1989 film Driving Miss Daisy; The Help book of 2009 by Kathryn Stockett and its 2011 film adaptation The Help worked to redress this stock character's role in fiction.; Stephen the house slave in Django Unchained
Don Quixote/Old Hero	An ageing hero who comes out of retirement to go on one final quest or adventure. Is often dismissed as a perilous old fool or a liability by the younger hotshot heroes, but proves them wrong by succeeding against the odds.	Ben Kenobi in A New Hope; Cohen the Barbarian in Discworld; Arnold Schwarzenegger and Sly Stallone in The Expendables; Harrison Ford in Indiana Jones and the Dial of Destiny; Man of La Mancha; Donkey Xote
Doppelgänger/lookalike/human clone	A character that usually very closely resembles, but with a malevolent or diversely contrasting temperament, who is not necessarily related to another benevolent character in the same fictional universe and may come from a parallel universe. In science fiction the villain may be an evil clone of the hero. In war films the lookalike serves as the general's decoy. Usually, they are portrayed on screen by the same actor in a dual role. See also: Evil twin	Bizarro in DC Comics; Mirror Universe characters in the Star Trek television and film series; Katherine Pierce in The Vampire Diaries television series; Eric Cartman's good doppleganger from the evil dimension in South Park; The Prince and the Pauper by Mark Twain; M. E. Clifton James in I Was Monty's Double; Padme Amidala's handmaidens in The Phantom Menace; Commander Cody in Attack of the Clones; The gholas and face dancers in Dune; Michael Keaton in Multiplicity; Orphan Black; Aeon Flux
Dragon/ basilisk	An ancient, winged reptile with the ability to breathe fire, fly, and sometimes communicate with humans. European dragons are evil and obsessed with hoarding treasure, but Chinese dragons are wise and compassionate. Variants include the wyvern, lindworm, basilisk, and cockatrice.	Falkor in Neverending Story; Draco in Dragonheart; Smaug in The Hobbit; Fafnir in Die Nibelungen; The dragon in the Last Dragonslayer; Donkey's wife in Shrek; Cinder in Dragonlance; Blazing Dragons; Toothless in How to Train Your Dragon; The Lernaean Hydra in Jason and the Argonauts; The Lambton Worm; Ghidorah; The basilisk in Harry Potter; Little Petey in Hagar and the Basilisk
Dragon Lady	A stereotype of East Asian (and occasionally South or Southeast Asian) women as strong, deceitful, domineering, or mysterious. Originating in late 19th- and early 20th-century Western media, the archetype combines exotic allure with ruthless political or criminal ambition, often serving as a formidable adversary or treacherous seductress to Western protagonists. See also: stereotype of East Asian South Asian	The Dragon Lady in Terry and the Pirates (1934–1973); Hui Fei in Shanghai Express (1932); O-Ren Ishii in Kill Bill: Volume 1 (2003); Wai Lin (subverted heroic variation) in Tomorrow Never Dies (1997); Anna May Wong's role of the princess in the 1931 film Daughter of the Dragon; Lucy Liu's roles in Charlie's Angels, Kill Bill, and Payback; Wai Lin in the 1997 James Bond film*; Ming Lee, voiced by Sandra Oh in the 2022 Pixar film Turning Red; Shampoo in Ranma 1/2; Boa Hancock in One Piece
Dream maker/Sandman	Ruler of a fantasy world who brings dreams (and sometimes nightmares) to children. Has a bag of magical sand that sends them to sleep.	Nilus the Sandman; The Dream Maker and his evil rival Zordrak, Lord of Nightmares; Dream of the Endless in Neil Gaiman's Sandman; The BFG catches living dreams with a butterfly net and keeps them in jars; In Rise of the Guardians the Sandman teams up with Jack Frost, Santa Claus, the Easter Bunny and Tooth Fairy; The main villain of Sleepstalker; The Sandman is represented as a malevolent spirit in The Real Ghostbusters; Freddy Krueger is a serial killer who manifests himself as nightmares
Drill sergeant	The staff sergeant, gunnery sergeant, or warrant officer in charge of instructing incoming military recruits in basic training. They are strict, demanding leaders who are either loved or hated; good drill sergeants earn respect of their recruits when the training and discipline they impart ends up saving lives, while bad or sadistic drill sergeants may be reviled or even fragged.	Sgt Snorkel in the comic strip from the 1950s Beetle Bailey; William Hartnell's role of the titular Sgt Grimshaw in the first of the 31 Carry On films, Carry On Sergeant; Battery Sergeant Major Tudor Bryn "Shut Up" Williams played by Windsor Davies in the 1970s BBC television sitcom series It Ain't Half Hot Mum; Emil Foley in the 1982 film An Officer and a Gentleman; Gunnery Sergeant Hartman (R. Lee Ermey) in the 1987 film Full Metal Jacket; Damon Wayans's titular role in the 1995 film Major Payne; Herbert Sobel in the American television series Band of Brothers; Sergeant Lynch in Sharpe's Regiment; Clancy Brown as the drill instructor in Starship Troopers
Drug dealer	A villain who deals in heroin, cocaine, crystal meth or cannabis. May be a sleazy back alley dealer or a drug lord/ narcoterrorist from the Latin American cartel or a local gang leader. See also crime boss.	Franz Sanchez in Licence to Kill; Teddy in The Night Manager; Rastapopoulous in The Adventures of Tintin; Francisco Cindino in Con Air; Ramon Cota in Delta Force 2: The Colombian Connection; Pablo Escobar in American Made; Tommy Shelby in Peaky Blinders; Carl White in EastEnders; Jay and Silent Bob; Walter White in Breaking Bad
Dutchman/ German immigrant	A hardworking but clumsy immigrant with a heavy accent. The Dutchman wears wooden clogs and a blue skipper cap, loves pancakes, smokes a meerschaum tobacco pipe, grows tulips and vegetables in his garden, and travels everywhere by boat or bicycle. The German loves bratwurst and sauerkraut and may a scientist or doctor fleeing Nazi persecution. For Germans who support the Nazis, see Hun	Irish-American criminal Amsterdam Vallon impersonates a Dutch immigrant in Gangs of New York; Rip Van Winkle; The Dutch boy who assists Little Audrey in Santa's Surprise; Tramun Cuttlefish Clogg in Martin the Warrior; Goldmember; Oskar Relstaub in Deerfoot of the Shawnee; Abraham Erskine in Captain America; Johann Krauss in Hellboy 2; Doctor Lipschitz in Rugrats; Baltus Van Tassel in Sleepy Hollow; The Katzenjammer Kids; Max and Moritz; Owl Jolson's parents in I Love to Singa

== E ==
Character type	Description	Examples
Eccentric/cool uncle or aunt	An charismatic, interesting older relative idolized by the kids. Often acts and dresses younger and more stylishly than his/her actual middle age and has an unusual backstory, career or hobby. Is a substitute parent when they visit, giving advice to younger people. May be a millionaire, action hero or professor.	Uncles: Uncle Jesse from the sitcom Full House was exciting for the kids to have around,as he was multitalented (he was a musician, radio station host, and motorcycle enthusiast).; Yosuke in Uncle from Another World; Uncle Vanya; Mr. Magoo; John Candy as Buck Russell in Uncle Buck; Uncle Grandpa; Uncle Lancelot in The Fantastic Flying Journey; Aunts: Aunt Becky in the sitcom Full House was a mother figure to the Tanner girls who was often giving advice.; Aunt Viv in the sitcom The Fresh Prince Of Bel-Air took care of Will and gave him advice on dating.; Aunt Hilda and Aunt Zelda in Sabrina The Teenage Witch were hip Aunts who helped Sabrina learn how to be a witch, while also giving general "coming of age" advice.
Egyptians	In works set in Ancient Egypt the main character may be a priest, astrologer, embalmer, engineer or architect working on the pyramids. The pharaoh may be a good king who is wise and just or an arrogant tyrant who enslaves the Hebrews. An undead Egyptian mummy is a common antagonist in horror films. In modern times, Egyptians are often grave robbers, market traders hawking counterfeit ancient artefacts, or tour guides.	Edifis in Asterix and Cleopatra; Boris Karloff as Imhotep in The Mummy; King Memnon in The Scorpion King; Ramirez in Highlander claimed he wasn't Scottish, but Egyptian.; Sallah in Raiders of the Lost Ark; Black Adam in Shazam!; Pharaoh in Joseph and the Amazing Technicolor Dreamcoat; Elizabeth Taylor as Cleopatra; Yul Brynner as Ramses II in The Ten Commandments
El bandido/Vaquero	This pejorative stereotype of a Mexican bandit was established early and common in silent era Western films. It depicted the characters as missing teeth, being poorly groomed (unshaven, unwashed hair), unintelligent, and as having a violent, treacherous, and emotionally impulsive disposition. Opposing the bandits was the heroic Mexican charro or vaquero who protected the villagers from injustice and tyranny. If he is attractive, this underdog hero is usually a Latin lover.	The villain in Bronco Billy and the Greaser (1914); El Guapo and his band of bandits in ¡Three Amigos! 1986 American Western comedy film; Tuco in The Good, the Bad and the Ugly; El Loco in Danger Mouse; Calvera in The Magnificent Seven; Anthony Quinn in Viva Zapata!; Yul Brynner and Charles Bronson in Villa Rides; The Three Caballeros; El Kabong; El Nombre
Elderly martial arts master	A wise old figure who mentors the young disciple in his ancient craft. Typically an East Asian male, he is a near-invincible master of the martial arts, despite being advanced in age and presumably having a decrease in physical strength. Often he possesses the rank of sensei and is referred to as such by his student. The elderly master most often teaches either generic kung fu or an exotic style specific to the fictional period. During the films, the master often becomes close with his students, with the master becoming a guardian figure to the trainees, who are, in turn, looked upon as the master's children.	Yoda in the film series Star Wars; Mr. Miyagi in the film series The Karate Kid; Splinter in the animated television series Teenage Mutant Ninja Turtles; Mr. Lee in the film Sidekicks; Kutang Pan in Kapitan Bomba; Ra's al Ghul in the DC Comics; Sifu in Kung Fu Panda; Pai Mai in Kill Bill; Master Roshi in Dragon Ball; Yagyu Retsudo in Shogun Assassin
Elemental	A spirit or creature personifying earth, air, fire or water or a person who can control one of the four elements. The latter is usually a wizard or superhero.	Aang, the Last Airbender; Fireboy and Watergirl; The Balrogs and dragons in The Silmarillion; Pyro in X-Men: The Last Stand; Johnny Storm of the Fantastic Four; The river god in Spirited Away; Wade Ripple in Elemental; Old Father Thames; The four winds in H.R. Pufnstuf
Eldritch abomination/Cosmic horror/Corruptor	A horrific ancient alien monster from the writings of H. P. Lovecraft with tentacles, multiple eyes and rows of teeth that is worshipped as a dark god. This deceitful shapeshifter is aligned with the evil forces of chaos and seeks to corrupt humans into releasing it from its prison to bring about the end of the world.	Cthulhu, Yog-Sothoth, Nyarlahotep, and Azathoth from Lovecraft's Cthulhu Mythos; Gozer in Ghostbusters; The Thing in Miss Faversham's Attic from The Real Ghostbusters; The Ancient Spirits of Evil in Thundercats; Nurgle in Warhammer 40,000; Quatermass and the Pit; Irene in Minions & Monsters; The titular villain in The Eye of Braxus; The Great Old Ones in Cast a Deadly Spell; Baal in Ash vs Evil Dead; The Call of Cthulhu
Elves, fairies and little people	A human-like race with magical powers such as the ability to grant wishes. Variants include the elf, fairy, leprechaun, gnome and pixie. In fantasy works fairies are usually good, but evil equivalents also exist like the goblin, banshee or changeling.	The Little Grey Men; Santa Claus' elves in movies like Santa Claus Conquers the Martians, Elf, or The Santa Clause; Cinderella's fairy godmother; The fairies in Legend; The helpful leprechaun in Jack the Giant Killer; Technical Fairy 1st Class in Private Snafu; Mavis Cruet in Willo the Wisp; Joy in The Bugaloos; Evil fairies include the Snow Queen, Maleficent in Disney's Sleeping Beauty and Queen Jadis of Narnia
Emissary/Ambassador/Diplomat	A high ranking civil servant in charge of international relations who is an intelligent, strategic thinker who is trusted and discreet. In historical stories, he usually wears a variant of diplomatic dress comprising a black tailcoat with gold leaf embroidery, knee breeches, buckled shoes and a bicorne hat. Is responsible for forming alliances, negotiating trade deals and declaring war. Sometimes he is part of a third, neutral faction seeking to make peace between two warring countries.	Lord Holdhurst in The Adventure of the Naval Treaty; Norman Wisdom in Man of the Moment; Robert Mitchum as The Ambassador; Gandalf the Grey in The Hobbit; Ken Taylor in Argo; John Abraham as The Diplomat; Bail Organa and Viceroy Nute Gunray in Star Wars; Captain Picard in The Outrageous Okona; The Consul; The Queen's Messenger
Enchantress/Priestess/Sorceress	The female counterpart to the wise old man, she uses her wisdom to give advice to the protagonist. In fantasy, she is a benevolent female figure with magical powers who gifts the hero with an enchanted object to aid in their quest, and is often a centuries-old elf with immortality. See also witch and magical girl.	Wise women: The Mother in The Wise Old Woman by Yoshiko Uchida uses her wisdom to outsmart a cruel ruler.; Mrs. Earbrass in The Hearing Trumpet by Leonora Carrington is an elderly woman who fights for feminist causes in the retirement home she lives in.; Enchantresses: Sorceress in Masters of the Universe; Galadriel in The Lord of the Rings by J.R.R. Tolkien is a wise Elf queen who gives advice and magical gifts to the Fellowship; The Which in The Phantom Tollbooth; The Lady of the Lake; Glinda in The Wizard of Oz; Mara in Sorcereress; Fin Raziel in Willow; Zi Yuan in The Mummy 3; Nest the priestess in Slaine the King
Environmentalist/ eco-warrior	A defender of nature against the corporations seeking to exploit its scarce resources or pollute the habitat of endangered species. Is often a hippie or white saviour who goes native. An evil eco-terrorist will release deadly chemical weapons on innocent citizens in an attempt to force governments to change their policies	Captain Planet; The Lorax; Princess Leila in Stop the Smoggies; Jake Sully in Avatar 2; The Wild Thornberrys; Poison Ivy in Batman; John and Carol Brightling in Rainbow Six; The Wombles
Eskimo/Inuit	Natives of tribes located near the Arctic Ocean, such as the Yupik peoples of Siberia and Alaska, Inuit of Greenland and northern Canada, Cree, Innu and Naskapi of Labrador and far northern Quebec, or Sami people in Lapland. Lives in an igloo, eats raw whale blubber, wears a sealskin parka, hunts with a harpoon, and travels by kayak or sledge pulled by Malamutes. In modern-day stories, Inuit use rifles, motorboats and snowmobiles.	Noggin the Nog's bride, Queen Nooka; Lady Silence in The Terror; Pingu; Tommy in Yvon of the Yukon; Nanook of the North; Gaaba Petersen as Inuk; Atanarjuat: The Fast Runner
Essex girl/chav	The loudmouthed, vulgar female counterpart to the Essex boy and angry young man commonly seen in soap operas and sitcoms. If she is on benefits she will wear a pink tracksuit with a gold clown pendant or leggings with white sneakers, live in a council house, have a croydon facelift hairstyle, and have five kids from different baby daddies. If her parents are nouveau riche Londoners she will have blonde hair extensions and wear stiletto heels, a microskirt, a burberry handbag, large hoop earrings and a fur coat with no knickers.	Lauren Pope in The Only Way is Essex; Posh Spice in Spiceworld; Vicky Pollard in Little Britain; Rebel Wilson in Grimsby; Chantelle in Benidorm; Becky in Kidulthood
Eunuch	This character is a boy or man who has been castrated to make them less threatening servants of a royal court, where they serve as courtiers, domestics, concubines, royal guards, government officials, guardians of women or harem servants. Rulers preferred eunuchs because, having no offspring or in-laws, they were seen as more trustworthy and less interested in establishing a private dynasty. Despite their humble official roles, they have "the ruler's ear" which gives de facto power to these servants, enabling some to gain influence. Eunuchs who rise to positions of power may be depicted as cruel villains. See also Flunky.	In Eunuchus (The Eunuch), a comedy by the Roman playwright Terence, Dorus is a eunuch bought as a gift for Thais, a female character. Chaerea, a young man who is in love with Thais, disguises himself as the eunuch Dorus to gain access to her.; The eunuch Manan is a major character in The Tombs of Atuan (1971), the second book from Ursula K. Le Guin's Earthsea series.; Eunuchs appear often as villains in Hong Kong kung fu and wuxia films set in ancient China. A popular eunuch villain used in ancient China stories is Eunuch Wei, who is based on a historical figure named Wei Zhongxian. Eunuch villains are usually in charge of powerful political posts.; Bagoas, the eunuch favorite of Alexander the Great's, is the main character and narrator of The Persian Boy (1972), an historical novel by Mary Renault.; Castrati singers in 18th-century Italy are the main characters of Anne Rice's novel Cry to Heaven (1982).; Sadi, the chief eunuch to Queen Salmissra, in David Eddings' series The Belgariad (1982–1984) and The Malloreon (1987–1991) is called "The Man who is no Man."; The society described in Rieko Yoshihara's Japanese novel (and later anime series) Ai no Kusabi (1987) has within its caste system "Furniture", or eunuchs who act as servants to the highest social class.; Sazed, a major character in Brandon Sanderson's Mistborn trilogy, was made a eunuch at a young age to prevent his magical abilities being inherited.; The eunuch Varys (also called the Spider) is a top court official bearing the title of Master of Whisperers, a spymaster, in George R. R. Martin's fantasy series A Song of Ice and Fire and its TV adaptation, Game of Thrones
Everyman	An ordinary, humble individual, the Everyman may be a stand-in for the audience, narrator, or reader.	Homer Simpson in the animated television sitcom series The Simpsons; Al Bundy from the American sitcom Married... with Children; Dr. Watson in the book, film, and television series of Sherlock Holmes; Jonathan Harker in the 1897 book Dracula by Bram Stoker; Reggie Bannister in Phantasm; Arthur in The Cars That Ate Paris; Christian in The Pilgrim's Progress
Evil clown	Violent, malevolent beings that ironically resemble clowns. This stock character is a subversion of the traditional comic clown character, in which the playful trope is instead depicted in a more disturbing nature through the use of horror elements and dark humor. The character can be seen as playing on the sense of unease felt by sufferers of coulrophobia, the fear of clowns.	Art the Clown in the film series Terrifier.; Joker from the DC Comics.; Pennywise in Stephen King's book It.; Killer Klowns from Outer Space; Zebo in Are You Afraid of the Dark?; Mr. Ring-a-Ding in Doctor Who
Evil twin	A malevolent character that resembles and is usually related to – most commonly a literal twin of – another, benevolent, character in the same universe; usually portrayed by the same actor in a dual role.	Adam Chandler in the television series All My Children; Phoebe Buffay's twin sister Ursula, both played by Lisa Kudrow in the television sitcom series Friends; Alex Drake in the television series Pretty Little Liars; Cassandra Nova in the X-Men; Bizarro is Superman's evil twin from another dimension; In The Great Dictator, Adenoid Hynkel is the evil lookalike to the Jewish barber; Captain Rex in Star Wars is the good clone brother of Boba Fett
Evil uncle/Aunt	The lawful guardian to an orphan who seems to want them dead. May be a tyrant who usurped the good king, an outwardly respectable member of the community secretly involved in criminality, or a cad who intends to swindle the young heiress out of her inheritance. A similar character is the cruel or neglectful aunt who is either the wife of the evil uncle, or an unattractive old spinster (see hag).	Scar in the Lion King; King Twala in King Solomon's Mines; Uncle Ebenezer in Kidnapped; Shakespeare's King Richard III; Count Olaf in A Series of Unfortunate Events; Noggin the Nog's uncle Nogbad the Bad; Grau Puig and his wife Isabella in Cathedral of the Sea; Aunts Spiker and Sponge in James and the Giant Peach; Petunia Dursley in Harry Potter and the Philosopher's Stone; Sylvester Sneakly in The Perils of Penelope Pitstop
Exorcist/Paranormal investigator/Occultist	A priest, occultist or scientist investigating paranormal phenomena. May possess a magical object, advanced technology or holy relic capable of capturing ghosts and demons.	Max von Sydow as The Exorcist; Russell Crowe as The Pope's Exorcist; Father Burke in The Nun; Frank Adamsky in Amityville 2; Richard Moore in The Exorcism of Emily Rose; Ray Stantz in Ghostbusters; John Hurt in Hellboy; Gabriel Van Helsing in Dracula
Executioner	In medieval costume dramas, the torturer or executioner wears a black hood, may interrogate suspects, and beheads the king's enemies with an axe or sword. In an early modern setting, especially in continental Europe, he may operate a guillotine or other execution method such as a short drop gallows. In modern prison films, he is often the villainous prison warden who operates the gallows trapdoor, gas chamber or electric chair.	The Bastard Executioner; Jack Ketch in Punch and Judy; The Hangman from animated film of the same name.; William Wade in Gunpowder; Stacy Keach as Jonas Candide in The Traveling Executioner; In Luna Nera, Pietro's father is the Bishop's lead inquisitor; Timothy Spall as Albert Pierrepoint in Pierrepoint; Butcher in Thieves of the Wood; Police inspector Popil guillotines a Nazi war criminal in Hannibal Rising

== F ==
Character type	Description	Examples
Fagin	A charismatic, manipulative Dickensian-era criminal who employs kids as thieves or sweat shop labour. Is usually Jewish. In the original Oliver Twist novel he was a villain, but in more recent adaptations he may be a lovable rogue.	Fagin in Oliver and Company; Fagin the Jew; Norbert in Artful Dodger; Jack Spot in Once Upon A Time In London; Ikey Solomon in The Potato Factory; Tobias Beckett in Solo: A Star Wars Story
Fall guy	Typically a minor or side character – may be a total innocent or a petty criminal – ignorant of their role in the villain's larger plot, who is duped and "framed" or "fitted up" to "carry the can" as the scapegoat, when the police arrive, to be called to account for a crime in court. The term "fall guy" for one whom blame is directed upon to shield other more important people in a scandal had appeared in mass public culture in the United States at least by the 1920s. In 1925, it was the title of a Broadway comic play turned into a film in 1930, The Fall Guy, by James Gleason and George Abbott. Separately, in the film industry, the term is used for a stuntman – the person who takes the fall instead of a leading actor, too valuable to put at risk.	Johnny Quinlan, played by Jack Mulhall, the protagonist duped in the 1930 comedy film, The Fall Guy; Wilmer Cook, a petty criminal and gunman, in Dashiell Hammett's 1930 hardboiled detective book The Maltese Falcon, played by Elisha Cook Jr. in the 1941 film; Biff in the 1941 romantic comedy film The Strawberry Blonde; Colt Seavers, a stuntman played by Lee Majors, in the 1980s American television action series The Fall Guy
Fallen hero	The chosen one's predecessor who was often a pupil of the wise old man before turning to evil. A common antagonist in wuxia and fantasy literature whom the hero must face in the final confrontation.	Raoh in Fist of the North Star; Anakin Skywalker in Revenge of the Sith; Saruman in The Two Towers; Tai-Lung in Kung Fu Panda; Dwayne Johnson as The Scorpion King; Sentinel Prime in Transformers: Dark of the Moon; Racer X and Jason Todd are examples of fallen heroes who became antiheroes rather than villains
False friend/Frenemy	A villain who befriends the hero with the intention of corrupting or misleading them. May be motivated by ignorance, malice or misguided altruism.	Palpatine in Revenge of the Sith; Sauron in The Silmarillion; Goomi in Minions & Monsters; Rex Dangervest in The Lego Movie 2; King Candy/Turbo in Wreck-It Ralph; Scar in The Lion King; The snake that tricked Adam and Eve in the Garden of Eden
Farmer's daughter	A desirable, wholesome, and naive young woman, also described as being an "open-air type" and "public-spirited".	Elly May Clampett in the television sitcom series The Clampetts; Bradley Sisters in the television sitcom series Petticoat Junction; Mary Ann Summers in the television sitcom series Gilligan's Island; Daisy Duke in the television series The Dukes of Hazard; Daisy Mae Yokum in the comic strip Li'l Abner
Farmer's wife	The "long-suffering farmer's wife" is a foil against the leading characters, used as a contrast to the other female stock characters – the "hooker with a heart of gold" and the "schoolma'am" — and is common in Western films. John Steinbeck, in his 1937 book Of Mice and Men, has Curley's wife, who is never named, which shows that she is just a stock character to emphasize this point.	Mrs Hale in the 1916 play Trifles; Grace Archer, Jill Archer, Peggy Woolley, and Clarrie Grundy in the BBC radio series The Archers running since 1950s; Lisa Dingle in Emmerdale Farm; Mrs Tweedy in Chicken Run; Mrs Hoggett in Babe; Martha Kent in Superman; Grandma Tracy in Thunderbirds
Female clown (Hispanic)	Also called a "Latin Spitfire" or "Mexican Spitfire", in this stereotype, a Hispanic woman's ditzy antics are used to make the audience laugh derisively at her. While she is alluring, her value as a full character is blunted by her comic treatment. This is the female version of the Male buffoon (Hispanic).	Carmen Miranda, noted for her extravagant head-wear.; Lupe Vélez notably in the eight-film Mexican Spitfire series that gave its name to the stock character
Femme fatale	An almost obligatory character who is integral in Film Noir, she is an antagonist originally appearing as a beautiful and alluring woman who is also cunning, deceptive, and traitorous. She may originally appear as a damsel in distress, but then she draws men into a honey trap, and may be motivated by money, power, revenge, or status.	Salome, granddaughter of Herod the Great in the New Testament of the Bible; Ruth Wonderly in the 1930 book The Maltese Falcon by Dashiell Hammett; Phyllis Dietrichson in the 1944 film Double Indemnity; Catherine Tramell in the 1992 erotic thriller film Basic Instinct; Bridget Gregory in the 1994 neo-noir film The Last Seduction; Poison Ivy in DC Comics; Many Bond girls, especially Electra King from Die Another Day, Miss Brandt from You Only Live Twice, Severine in Skyfall, and Xenia Onatopp in GoldenEye
Ferryman	They are guides who are paid to transport characters in a vessel to get them to a hard-to-reach destination. In mythological or fantasy stories, the destination may be underworld, purgatory or a similar mystical realm. In some stories, there may not be mythological aspects and the character may secretly transport people or cargo to a very hard to reach destination or help people secretly leave an area controlled by the enemy. They may offer passage in some type of vessel (boat, flying craft, spaceship), or via magical or fantastic methods (teleportation, portals, or dream travel). The passengers typically pay the ferryman or guide. In mythological stories, gold coins on the eyes of the deceased or completion of a ritual or obligation may be required. In myths, they may act as a Deus ex machina.	In Greek mythology, Charon is a psychopomp, the ferryman of the Greek underworld. He carries the souls of those who have been given funeral rites across the rivers Acheron and Styx, which separate the worlds of the living and the dead.; Aqen was an ancient Egyptian deity of the underworld. He is first mentioned in the famous Book of the Dead. There, he guided the sun god Ra as the "protector of Ra's celestial bark" (a boat) by "bringing the shen-ring to his majesty".; Heimdall from Thor; In A New Hope, smuggler and pilot-for-hire Han Solo transports Luke Skywalker and Obi-Wan in the Millennium Falcon on the dangerous trip to the planet Alderaan for a large fee.; The title character in the Chris de Burgh song "Don't Pay the Ferryman" borrows from the myth.
Film director/Producer/Playwright	A visionary scriptwriter, director or producer who wants to make a film or put on a theatre production that will capture the audience's imagination. In film, they use a megaphone and clapper board to communicate with the actors and film crew. They are usually highly intelligent and have an extensive knowledge of their art, but this is often accompanied by a huge ego, a demanding personality and a refusal to hear contrary views. Artist creatives in film and theater often clash with funders, management and performers over their creative vision.	James, a filmmaker Minion, in Minions & Monsters; Kermit the Frog, who is promoting a Broadway show in The Muppets Take Manhattan; Toby Grummett (played by Adam Driver), a director who comes back to the village where he filmed his student film ten years ago in The Man Who Killed Don Quixote; Johnny Depp as Ed Wood; Carl Denham in King Kong; Shakespeare In Love; Seneca the Younger in Fire Over Rome; Philip Seymour Hoffman as Capote; Gene Wilder in The Producers
Finns/Scandinavians	The Finn is a peaceful farmer, hunter, reindeer herder, fisherman or lumberjack content with taking saunas, drinking milk (or stronger distilled beverages), rowing his boat on the lake, and enjoying walks in the forest to forage for berries and mushrooms. However, when his country is invaded he becomes a deadly one man army who uses his trusty hunting rifle and his knowledge of the terrain to decimate more numerous and better equipped enemies. In modern times the Finn loves heavy metal music, plays ice hockey and supports conservationism. He may be on first-name terms with mythical creatures such as trolls, talking animals or Santa Claus' elves. A Finnish woman is often a folk healer or white witch. Danes, Swedes and Norwegians are often interior designers, cheesy pop singers or detectives in gritty scandi noir murder mysteries. For their viking ancestors, see barbarian.	Aatami Korpi in Sisu: Road to Revenge; Kari in Amazon; Nightwish in Imaginaerum; Pietari in Rare Exports: A Christmas Tale; The Lapp woman in The Snow Queen; The Moomins; Rupert Bear's friend Rika the Reindeer Girl; Sarah Lund in The Killing; Saga Noren in The Bridge; Viktoria Rahbek in Greyzone; The Troll Hunter; Kurt Wallander; Skwisgaar Skwigelf of Dethklok; Farmer Weathersky
Firefighter	A modern-day hero who risks his life to save people trapped in burning buildings. They wear a helmet, a heavy coat, and an oxygen mask, and they use a fire axe to clear debris and a hose to put out fires. While the character may demonstrate a wide range of skills and ingenuity in their firefighting, their most important trait is their bravery. May keep a Dalmatian dog as a pet (or, if an anthropomorphic animal, a Dalmatian himself)	Hugh, Pugh, Barney McGrew, Cuthbert, Dribble, and Grub of the Trumpton Fire Brigade; Fireman Sam; Marshall in Paw Patrol; Steve McQueen in The Towering Inferno; Joaquin Phoenix in Ladder 49; Malcolm Cross in London's Burning; Kev in The Smoke; Dennis in Steel River Blues; Guy Montag in Fahrenheit 451; Mose the Fireboy; Billy Blazes in Rescue Heroes
Figaro/ barber	The French polymath playwright Pierre Beaumarchais created the comic character of Figaro who plays the role of a barber who has become a cunning, scheming, insubordinate gentleman's valet across a satirical trilogy of plays — Le Barbier de Séville of 1772, Le Mariage de Figaro of 1778, and L'Autre Tartuffe ou La Mère coupable (The Guilty Mother) of 1792. The character is inspired by the commedia dell'arte stock character of Brighella, and like his predecessor he is a clever liar; moral and yet unscrupulous; good humored, helpful and brave, though somewhat embittered and cynical. Though he is normally calm, collected and intelligent, he can be irrational when angered. Given that the Figaro character tries so protect his wife from the romantic advances of his aristocratic master, the Figaro character is viewed as a fighter for freedom from tyranny, and as a result, some governments censored works about Figaro. Beaumarchais, may have created the Figaro character as an author surrogate for The Barber of Seville, as the playwright served time in jail for insubordination to the nobility.	Beaumarchais's character appears in four opera adaptations of his plays: Giovanni Paisiello's The Barber of Seville of 1782; Mozart's Le Nozze di Figaro of 1786; Gioachino Rossini's The Barber of Seville of 1816; Darius Milhaud's La Mère coupable of 1966; Woody Woodpecker's Barber of Seville; Bugs Bunny in Rabbit of Seville; Sacha Baron Cohen as Adolfo Pirelli, Sweeney Todd's rival
Final girl	A "last woman standing" from a group left in a horror (slasher) film after a serial killer or monster has eliminated her companions. Unlike her companions, such as the vain cheerleader and the dumb, macho jock, the "final girl" is more sensible and manages to outsmart the killer.	Mina Harker in the 1897 book Dracula by Bram Stoker; Jess Bradford as the original model in the 1974 film Black Christmas; Kelli Presley in the 2006 remake film Black Christmas; Sally Hardesty in The Texas Chain Saw Massacre film series; Laurie Strode in the Halloween film series; Sidney Prescott in the Scream film series; Abby Mills in the American television series Harper's Island
Fixer/Cleaner/Bagman	A fixer is a highly skilled person who can discreetly hide or destroy evidence of illegal or unethical behavior that could compromise a person or organization using a range of methods and tactics. Fixers range from sleazy lawyers and spin doctors who use technically legal, but unethical practices to criminal fixers and "cleaners" who do break and enter and destroy evidence. A mob leader may hire a "cleaner" to remove a dead body and other forensic evidence from a crime scene or a hacker to delete digital evidence of crimes on CCTV cameras. A powerful corporation may hire a crisis management expert or lawyer to use lawsuits and payoffs to make a scandal go away. A political party may have a bagman who delivers a briefcase of cash to pay off officials. A celebrity's agent may hire a fixer to keep a rising star's sexual misconduct or drug addiction out of the headlines.	In the TV series Ray Donovan, the eponymous character (played by Liev Schreiber) is a LA-based fixer who helps celebrities hide their dark secrets.; The Coen brothers' film Hail, Caesar! (2016) is inspired by Eddie Mannix's career as a Hollywood studio fixer during the 1950s, keeping A-list movie stars' misdeeds out of the public eye.; The movie Wolfs (2024) depicts rival elite fixers (played by George Clooney and Brad Pitt) who have to work together to clean up a gigolo's death in a luxury hotel.; In the British crime drama MobLand (2025), Harry Da Souza (Tom Hardy) is a street-smart and formidable fixer for the London-based Harrigan crime family.; Winston Wolf in Pulp Fiction
Flunky/Vizier/Evil Advisor	The flunky is an employee of a powerful leader in a high position of trust who is seemingly a loyal servant to their master. However, behind their obedient and submissive facade, they are a devious manipulator and schemer with their own agenda. This treacherous adviser will often whisper poison into the ear of a weak, naive, or aging monarch while secretly plotting to usurp the throne. Usually depicted with gaunt features, dark robes, and calculating ambition, the character exploits royal trust to oppress the kingdom. In fantasy, he may secretly be an evil sorcerer. In works based on the Arabian Nights, the treacherous vizier secretly conspires to be sultan instead of the sultan, but outwardly behaves like a dependable toady. He may be a bald, effeminate eunuch. An overambitious Caporegime in gangster movies can behave like this before he betrays and supplants the old crime boss.	Grima Wormtongue from The Two Towers; Piter DeVries the twisted Mentat from Dune; Dorian Tyrell in The Mask before he goes rogue; SkekSil the Skeksis chamberlain; Captain Darling from Blackadder; Starscream from Transformers; Urpgor from The Dreamstone; Iago (military advisor variation) in Othello by William Shakespeare; Petyr Baelish in A Song of Ice and Fire and Game of Thrones; The titular villain from The Eunuch of Stamboul by Dennis Wheatley; The eunuch forced to drink ink in The Last Emperor; Varys from Game of Thrones is a rare heroic example; Zigzag from The Thief and the Cobbler; Jafar from Disney's Aladdin; Iznogoud
Flying ace/Fighter pilot ace/Air ace/Ace pilot/Daredevil pilot/Starfighter pilot	The advent of aviation spawned a genre of adventure stories in which the brave, skilled pilot was the natural hero. Traits often attributed to the ace in war films are "boisterousness, camaraderie, stoicism and [perceived] omnipotence". In science fiction, this stock character is a "starfighter ace pilot."	Aircraft – books and comics: Biggles in the eponymous series of adventure books by W.E. Johns of the early 20th century; Hugh "Bulldog" Drummond in the eponymous series of adventure books by Sapper of the early 20th century; Hop Harrigan in the 1940s All-American Publications comics; Carol Danvers in Marvel Comics; Aircraft – films: Geoff Carter played by Cary Grant in Howard Hawks's 1939 film Only Angels Have Wings; Flying Tigers; God Is My Co-Pilot; Maverick in the Top Gun film series; Starfighter ace pilots: Luke Skywalker, Poe Dameron and Han Solo from Star Wars; Tom Paris from Star Trek: Voyager; Hoban "Wash" Washburne from Firefly
Foil	A character, especially in a double act, who is in most respects the opposite of the protagonist or straight man. The contrast between a character and their foil allows each characters' traits to be highlighted.	Lou Costello in the Abbott and Costello film series; Lucy Ricardo in the American television sitcom series I Love Lucy; Draco Malfoy in the Harry Potter book series by J. K. Rowling; Baldrick (played by Tony Robinson) in British television sitcom series Blackadder
Folk hero	A character whose heroic acts are left behind in their people's consciousness, often centuries after their death.	See: List of folk heroes
Fool	A court jester who made the king and nobles laugh by telling rhyming jokes and riddles, and by doing physical feats like juggling. Jesters could criticise nobility at court and make fun of royal decisions, as long as the criticism was hidden amidst witty wordplay and riddles. Shakespeare used the fool as a main character so that he could have a character who could speak truthfully, even to a powerful king. This character often appear as either a simpleton or the opposite, (who only pretend to be simple as a ruse), with a very few falling in between.	Simpleton fools: Nick Bottom in the play A Midsummer Night's Dream by William Shakespeare; Costard in the play Love's Labours Lost by William Shakespeare; Dogberry in the play Much Ado About Nothing by William Shakespeare; Ivan the Fool in Russian folklore; Wise fools: Feste in the play Twelfth Night by William Shakespeare; The Wise Men of Gotham; The Fool in the 1988 book Wyrd Sisters by Terry Pratchett
Fop	A pejorative character in English literature and especially comic drama, as well as satirical prints, the fop is a foolish "man of fashion" who overdresses, aspires to wit, and puts on airs. He may also overdo being fashionably Gallic by wearing French clothes and using French words. The fop may aspire to a higher social station than others think he has. Sometimes he is a rake and a wastrel, or has a secret alter ego as a highwayman or spy. He may be somewhat effeminate, although this rarely affects his pursuit of an heiress. See also dandy.	Sir Fopling Flutter in George Etherege's 1676 play The Man of Mode, Sir Fopling Flutter; Sir Novelty Fashion in Colley Cibber's 1696 play Love's Last Shift; Lord Foppington in John Vanbrugh's 1696 play The Relapse; George IV as Prince Regent in Blackadder III; King Louis XIV in Albert the Fifth Musketeer; The Marquis D'Apcher in Brotherhood of the Wolf; Chevalier Balbari in Barry Lyndon; The Scarlet Pimpernel; Sir Henry Simmerson in Sharpe's Company; Rege-Jean Page in Bridgerton; Beau Brummel
Forger	This highly skilled white collar criminal alters or fakes legal documents, makes counterfeit money, or creates art which is claimed to be by a famous artist to defraud buyers or advance an illegal scheme. In crime films and film noir stories, they are a sub-type of con artist who work for organized crime; however, unlike the Mob's cadre of thugs, they are an educated elite. Like the gentleman thief stock character, they eschew violence and commit crimes with their skill at deception. In thrillers and spy stories, forgers create fake passports to help spies get into a country or escape from a country. If the forger is in prison or in a POW camp, they have to make DIY cameras and homemade stamps to create false documents, an even more impressive feat. If the forger must fake digital documents, they are likely a hacker.	In the 1839 novel by Honoré de Balzac, the titular character of Pierre Grassou is an artist who lives off making art forgeries.; The 1966 heist comedy film How to Steal a Million centers around Nicole Bonnet (Audrey Hepburn) attempting to steal a fake Cellini made by her grandfather.; In The Great Escape, the forger Blythe uses everyday materials inside a POW camp to create fake travel passes and identity cards for Allied prisoners of war; The 1964 children's book Charlie and the Chocolate Factory written by Roald Dahl revealed the "golden ticket" in Japan was created by a forger.; The 1972 novel by Irving Wallace, The Word concerns archaeological forgery, the finding and translation of a supposed lost gospel by James the Just, close relative of Jesus Christ, as part of a large project to be published as a new Bible that would inspire a Christian revival, but which is possibly a forged document.; The 2002 film Catch Me If You Can, directed by Steven Spielberg, is based on the claims of Frank Abagnale, a con man who allegedly stole over US$2.5 million through forgery, imposture and other frauds, which are dramatized in the film. His career in crime lasted six years from 1963 to 1969. The veracity of most of Abagnale's claims has been questioned.; The graphic art novel The Last Coiner, authored by Peter M. Kershaw, is based on the exploits of the 18th century English counterfeiters, the Cragg Vale Coiners, who were sentenced to execution by hanging at Tyburn.; In the film and musical Heathers, protagonist Veronica Sawyer scams her way into the titular clique via forgery, and soon avoids being implicated as an accessory to murder through the same method.
Foster parent/ step-parent	The guardian to an orphan, often an older relative such as an uncle or the second spouse of a widower. May be a loving parental substitute, or cruel and abusive like Cinderella's wicked stepmother. In ancient times, the rightful heir to the throne could be sent to a foster family for their own safety.	Mike Brady in The Brady Bunch; Hub McCann in Secondhand Lions; Owen Lars in Star Wars; Sir Ector; Vernon Dursley in Harry Potter; The Queen in Snow White; Lady Tremaine in Disney's Cinderella; Isabella Puig in Cathedral of the Sea
Freedom fighter	An idealistic guerrilla, dissident or rebel fighting to overthrow a tyrant and restore liberty. May be an American rebel, Maquisard, socialist, Yugoslav partisan, peasant, or ex-bandit. In some cases, the freedom fighter commits atrocities and becomes an evil terrorist, or seizes power and becomes more tyrannical than the old dictator.	Mel Gibson as The Patriot; V in V For Vendetta; Fess Parker as Davy Crockett; Dusko Babic in Wild Wind; Yul Brynner as Pancho Villa; Gael Garcia Bernal as Che Guevara in The Motorcycle Diaries; Mallory the Irish explosives expert in A Fistful of Dynamite; Maritza the partisan in Force 10 from Navarone; Princess Leia in Star Wars; Napoleon in Animal Farm
French maid	A stylized, over-sexualized, flirtatious domestic servant with a distinctive black uniform with white lace and apron. Her uniform may range from a conservative knee-length skirt in more realistic period pieces to a short skirt, stockings, and garters in more fantasy-oriented depictions. She may use a feather duster. She is a version of the cheeky, saucy soubrette character.	Magenta in the play and film musical of the mid-1970s The Rocky Horror Show; Madamoiselle in the 1943 film Heaven Can Wait; Young Moira O'Hara in the television series American Horror Story: Murder House; Ursula and Helene in Les Exploits d'un jeune Don Juan
Funny animal	In animation, the mischievous funny animal often exhibits human-like behavior. When pursued by a hunter or similar antagonist such as a dogcatcher, they will outwit or humiliate them with screwball comedy including misinformation, slapstick, drag and french kissing.	Daffy Duck; Felix the Cat; Goofy; Magilla Gorilla; Hoppy the Marvel Bunny; Tom and Jerry; Howard the Duck
Furry/costumed performer/gimp	A pervert with a sexual fetish for wearing an anthropomorphic animal fursuit. A similar character is the gimp who wears a latex mask. In black comedy the furry may be mistaken for a real coyote and shot by a farmer.	The Banana Splits Movie; Bosco the raider boss in Fallout 4; Psycho Mantis in Metal Gear Solid; Zed and Maynard's gimp in Pulp Fiction

== G ==
Character type	Description	Examples
Gamekeeper/Poacher	The poacher is a lovable rogue with a patched coat and whippet dog who shoots or traps small game such as bunnies or pigeons to feed his impoverished family. The gamekeeper is an employee of the big English country house who wears a norfolk jacket and is tasked with exterminating vermin and catching trespassers. A reformed poacher may find employment as a gamekeeper, while an unemployed gamekeeper will become a poacher. In war films the unit's sniper is usually an ex-poacher. Evil poachers also exist, usually in media set in Africa or America where they illegally hunt endangered species in the national park or nature reserve.	Rubeus Hagrid in Harry Potter; Pickles the dog becomes a gamekeeper after Ginger and Pickles' shop goes bankrupt; Zak Dingle in Emmerdale Farm; Sneezewort in The Little Grey Men; Daniel Hagman of Sharpe's Rifles; Tuvia Bielski in Defiance; Vassili Zaitsev in Enemy at the Gates; Elmer Fudd in Looney Tunes; Nero in Gorilla Adventure; Sunny in Fair Game
Gambler/card cheat	A common villain or antihero in Western films who wears black suits, expensive embroidered vests and carries ivory handled revolvers. Always has a derringer concealed inside his boot and may embellish his outfit with gambling themed motifs such as the ace of spades. In modern gangster films and caper films he is often a gentleman thief who tries to bust the mob-owned poker or roulette casino, sometimes with help from an inside man.	Captain Thunderbolt; Cary Grant in Gambling Ship; James Garner as Bret Maverick; Barney Lincoln in Kaleidoscope; Yan Ruisheng; King Dice in The Cuphead Show!; Duane and Blaine in Rat Race; Doc Holliday in Tombstone; Jack Manfred in The Croupier; Gambit in Deadpool & Wolverine
Gamine	A slim, mischievous, boyish, and street-smart young woman with wide eyes, short hair, and an elfin or waif-like charm. Popularized in mid-20th-century cinema, she combines youthful innocence with playful rebellion and effortless chic, often softening a cynical or world-weary older man.	Sabrina Fairchild in Sabrina (1954) and Holly Golightly in Breakfast at Tiffany's (1961), portrayed by Audrey Hepburn; Patricia Franchini in Breathless (1960), portrayed by Jean Seberg; Amélie Poulain in Amélie (2001); Edie Sedgwick as depicted in Factory Girl (2006)
Gangster's moll	In film noir movies about crime, the gangster's moll is usually an attractive, blonde – often a variant of the bimbo stereotype – who may be a former showgirl. The gangster often uses the moll as a "trophy" to boost his status. She may also be called a "gun moll". "Gun" was British slang for "thief", derived from Yiddish ganef and "moll" is also used as a euphemism for a woman prostitute.	Gwen Allen and Mamie, played by Jean Harlow and Joan Blondell, in the 1931 film The Public Enemy; Hilda, played by Joan Bennett, in the 1939 film The Housekeeper's Daughter; Bonnie Parker from Bonnie and Clyde; Tallulah from Bugsy Malone; Kitty from Dog City
Garbage collector/Street sweeper	A person employed by the county council to empty the bins and keep the streets clean. Despite his lowly status he takes pride in his work and is friendly to the neighbourhood kids.	Peter Cushing in Tales from the Crypt; Stepanovitch the road sweeper in Papa Panov; Martin Sheen in Badlands; Lala Hagoromo in Star Twinkle PreCure; Derf Backderf in Trashed; The Last Emperor after the cultural revolution; Wreck-Gar in Transformers
Gardener/Groundskeeper	An employee at an English country house or urban market gardener who sells his produce for a living. Is plagued by vermin such as rabbits or pigeons that constantly thwart his attempts to trap or shoot them. On council estates, the gardener may be a drug dealer who grows cannabis among his vegetables.	Mr. McGregor in The Tale of Peter Rabbit; Groundskeeper Willie in The Simpsons; Bayleaf in The Herbs; Pat and Bill in Alice's Adventures in Wonderland; Samwise Gamgee in The Fellowship of the Ring; Mrs Mulch in Curse of the Were-Rabbit; Professor Sprout in Harry Potter; Ben and Chon in Savages; Greenclaws
Gay best friend	Beginning in the 1980s, screenwriters of romantic comedy films and television dramas set in high schools added the "gay best friend" stock character. Typically, this comedic character type has elicited controversy in the gay community, because while they have introduced "...queer storylines to mainstream audiences," they have also entrenched a stereotype that gay men's only "interests are makeovers, shopping and drama". In addition, "gay best friend" characters tend to be sidelined into the role of giving relationship and fashion advice, with their character rarely having any depth or development. It has a parallel in the black best friend.	Tim, played by Nathan Lane, in the 1991 romantic comedy film Frankie and Johnny; Damian Leigh, played by Daniel Franzese, in the 2004 teen comedy film Mean Girls; Brent Van Camp (played by Paul Iacono) is a gay, but closeted teenage high school student in the 2013 comedy film G.B.F.; Kurt Hummel in the American television musical drama series Glee; William Clockwell in the American television superhero drama series Invincible
Geek	Originally, a nameless demented side-show freak, with depraved habits – such as biting the heads of small animals – to draw in crowds, and who is usually tied to drug addiction, typically alcohol in Prohibition-era U.S. as shown in the 1947 Film Noir classic Nightmare Alley. Now, typically an eccentric or non-mainstream person who is an enthusiast obsessed with an unusual hobby – such as an anorak-wearing trainspotter — or odd intellectual pursuit. It has a general pejorative meaning of a "peculiar person, especially one who is perceived to be overly intellectual, unfashionable, boring, or socially awkward". This stock character heavily overlaps and is used interchangeably with the nerd stereotype, but the geek may be depicted still in a more negative fashion. A more recent variant is the academically gifted but socially awkward geek girl. She is often a gamer girl, larper or weeb with an obsession with anime and manga.	"The Geek" in the 1984 film Sixteen Candles; Dr. Egon Spengler in the American film series Ghostbusters; Dr. Emmett Brown in the 1980s film series Back to the Future; Sheldon Cooper in the American television sitcom series The Big Bang Theory; Presto in Dungeons and Dragons; Gretchen in Recess; Cyd Sherman in The Guild; Evelyn in The Wild Hunt
Geisha	An exotic, sensual and cultured East Asian beauty able to charm any man (see also Hawksian woman). Graceful and elegant, she usually wears a silk kimono or revealing qipao. If she is the protagonist, she may also be an assassin or secret agent skilled in martial arts. The villainous equivalent is the dragon lady.	Nitta Sayuri in Memoirs of a Geisha; Okichi in The Barbarian and the Geisha; The title character in Madame Butterfly; Lei Fang in Dead or Alive; Lotus Blossom in Teahouse of the August Moon; Ada Wong in Resident Evil; Wu Liu in Gone with the Bullets
Gentle giant	A folklore figure who, despite the huge size and enormous strength, has a kind nature and sometimes is also soft-hearted. Further information: Giants (Greek mythology).	The eponymous giant at the tale's end in the 1888 short story "The Selfish Giant" by Oscar Wilde; Yukon Cornelius in the 1964 American television Christmas special Rudolph the Red-Nosed Reindeer; Fezzik in the 1973 novel The Princess Bride by William Goldman; Lenny Small in Of Mice and Men; Kronk Pepikrankenitz in the 2000 Disney film The Emperor's New Groove; Ralph Hinkley in The Green Mile; Rubeus Hagrid is a friendly half-giant in the Harry Potter book series by J. K. Rowling, and portrayed by Robbie Coltrane in the film adaptations; The Iron Giant; Windsor Gorilla in My Gym Partner's a Monkey
Gentleman thief	A sophisticated and elegant thief of the fin-de-siècle to the early 20th century. He has impeccable manners, courteousness, and charm, who typically tries to avoid violence by using deception, stealth, and his wits to steal. He goes for the thrill of the larcenous act itself, as well as to gain material wealth. This is often combined with correcting a moral wrong, selecting wealthy targets, or stealing only particularly rare or challenging objects. He is fairly similar to the confidence trickster. The female counterpart is typically referred to as a "lady thief".	A.J. Raffles in the eponymous book series by E.W. Hornung; Arsène Lupin in the eponymous book series by Maurice Leblanc; Kaito Kuroba in the manga series Magic Kaito; Sly Cooper of the eponymous video game; Roger Moore as Simon Templar, The Saint; Tuxedo Mask in Sailor Moon; Jimmie Dale, alias Grey Seal
Gestapo/Stasi/Secret police	An agent of a totalitarian dictatorship tasked with rooting out dissidents, similar to the medieval inquisitor. In Nazi Germany he will wear either a leather trenchcoat and fedora, or a black uniform with totenkopf insignia.	Toht in Raiders of the Lost Ark; Herr Otto Flick in Allo 'Allo!; Ludwig Kessler in Secret Army; Reinhard Heydrich in Operation Daybreak; Gruber in Hangmen Also Die!; Captain Vervain in Watership Down; The Thought Police in 1984; Napoleon's dogs in Animal Farm
Getaway driver/Hot rodder/Street racer	A teenage hot shot who becomes a speed demon when he gets behind the wheel of a fast car. Is often a greaser or 70s juvenile delinquent. His skill at winning illegal races may lead to him finding employment as a professional carjacker or personal driver to the local mob boss. Sometimes he is an undercover cop on a mission to infiltrate and bring down the mafia.	Dennis Wilson in Two Lane Blacktop; Detective Tanner in Driver; Vin Diesel in Fast and Furious; Stepan in Street Racers; Dum-Dum in Wacky Races; James Dean in Rebel Without A Cause; Pace in Gone in 60 Seconds; Clint Eastwood in Thunderbolt and Lightfoot; Ron Howard in Grand Theft Auto
Ghost	A widely used character used since ancient times appearing in myths and legends of prehistory from around the world. Ghost stories take as a premise the possibility of supernatural entity characters who are dead, but which can still communicate or characters' belief in these entities. The ghost may appear of its own accord or be summoned by magic or by inciting events or triggers. Linked to the ghost is the idea of a haunting, where a supernatural entity is tied to a place, object, or person. Ghost stories are commonly examples of ghostlore and they appear in supernatural fiction, weird fiction, and horror stories. Originally, ghosts appeared in the narrative as sentinels, portents of doom, or prophets of things to come. From this, they went on deliver a morality tales and were common among Christmas stories, popularised by the many short stories of Sheridan le Fanu and M.R. James. From the first Gothic horror / romance stories The Castle of Otranto of 1764 by Horace Walpole, they were a staple, with the rise of scary ghost characters, while comic forms have also developed in the 20th century.	Literature and theatre: The spirits of the blind prophet Tiresias, Ajax the Great, and Anticleia encountered in Hades's realm by Odysseus and his crew in the epic poem Odyssey; The ghost of Don Andrea and a ghost who is an embodiment of Revenge in the late 16th-century play The Spanish Tragedy by Thomas Kyd; The ghost of the old king in the 1600 play Hamlet by William Shakespeare; Ghosts in Richard III by Shakespeare; The murdered Banquo's ghost in Macbeth by Shakespeare; The Headless Horseman in the 1820 short story The Legend of Sleepy Hollow by Washington Irving; The Ghosts of Christmas that help Ebenezer Scrooge see the error of his miserly ways in the 1843 novel A Christmas Carol by Charles Dickens; Films and television shows: Elvira Condomine played by Kay Hammond in David Lean's 1945 film of Noël Coward's 1941 play Blithe Spirit and the 2020 film remake; Captain Daniel Gregg (played by Rex Harrison) in the 1947 film The Ghost and Mrs Muir; The ghosts of the former inhabitants of an old mansion who died in accidents (the first wife of Mr. Crain), from loneliness (her ill daughter Abigail) or suicide (Abigail's companion-nurse) in the 1963 film The Haunting based on the 1959 novel The Haunting of Hill House; The vengeful ghosts of Captain Blake and his crew, who were deliberately shipwrecked, in the 1980 film The Fog; Slimer in the 1980s Ghostbusters films; Freddy Krueger in the 1980s film series A Nightmare on Elm Street.; Shoeless Joe in the 1989 American film Field of Dreams based on the 1982 book Shoeless Joe by W. P. Kinsella; The murdered banker Sam Wheat (played by Patrick Swayze) returns as a ghost in the 1990 American film Ghost; Casper the Friendly Ghost, originally popular in cartoon form in the mid-20th century and latterly in the 1995 film Casper; Sadako Yamamura in the 1998 Japanese film Ring; Malcolm Crowe in the 1999 film The Sixth Sense; Enola Sciotti, Margaret McDermott, and Pamela Upton, all played by Javier Botet, and Mrs Cushing and Lady Sharpe, both played by Doug Jones, in the 2015 Gothic romance film Crimson Peak by Guillermo del Toro
Girl next door	A sweet, innocent young woman with a wholesome demeanor who lives in the same neighborhood as the protagonist, so they know each other as childhood friends. While she is reasonably attractive, the key factor in her appeal is her wholesome character and the lifelong connection to a small town or rural area, which may be contrasted with the different allure of more glamorous, cosmopolitan female characters.	Rachel Green in the 1990s American television sitcom series Friends; Carrie Bradshaw in the turn-of-the-millennium American television series Sex and the City; Bridget Jones in the 1990s newspaper column of The Independent and subsequent 1996 novel Bridget Jones's Diary by Helen Fielding; Leni Loud in the 2010s American television sitcom series The Loud House; Betty in The Archie Show; Ash Williams' girlfriend Linda in Evil Dead 2; Atlanta Shore in Stingray; Mary Ann Summers in Gilligan's Island; Lieutenant Athena in Battlestar Galactica
Gladiator	The brave, skilled arena fighter is a recurring protagonist of sword and sandal films set during the Roman Empire. The classic gladiator hero might be a prisoner forced to fight for his freedom, or the leader of a slave revolt. Variants include the charioteer and modern mixed martial arts cage fighter. Fantasy and science fiction films with a dystopian or post-apocalyptic setting may also feature gladiatorial combat, sometimes involving chainsaws, firearms and armoured cars.	Maciste in Cabiria; Ursus in Quo Vadis?; Kirk Douglas as Spartacus; Maximus in Gladiator and Lucius in Gladiator 2; Charlton Heston as Judah Ben-Hur; Asterix and Obelix in Asterix the Gladiator; Conan the Barbarian; Vega in Street Fighter; Beef Supreme in Idiocracy; Arnold Schwarzenegger in The Running Man; Jean Claude Van Damme in Bloodsport; Frankenstein in Death Race 2000
Governess	An educated, unmarried, and impoverished middle-class woman employed to live in a wealthy household and tutor the children in 18th- and 19th-century fiction. Occupying an ambiguous social space between family and servants, she frequently serves as a moral heroine who uncovers dark family secrets or falls in love with the brooding master of the estate.	Jane Eyre in Jane Eyre (1847) by Charlotte Brontë; Agnes Grey in Agnes Grey (1847) by Anne Brontë; The Governess in The Turn of the Screw (1898) by Henry James; Maria von Trapp in The Sound of Music (1965)
Glutton	A disgusting and greedy villain, normally a big fat man in a position of authority. Gorges himself on large quantities of lavish, expensive food while the common people are hungry and oppressed. Not to be confused with the Big Eater which is a good counterpart of the glutton.	Baron Vladimir Harkonnen; Jabba the Hutt; Charles Laughton in The Private Life of Henry VIII; Stephen Fry as the Master of Lake-town in The Hobbit; Mr. Creosote in Monty Python's Meaning of Life; SkekAyuk in The Dark Crystal; Auric Goldfinger; Peter Griffin in Family Guy; Big Dan Teague in O Brother, Where Art Thou?; Eric Cartman in South Park
Gods and demigods	In Norse mythology and Greco-Roman mythology a pantheon of gods ruled by a skyfather such as Jupiter or Odin observes humanity. If the king of the gods impregnates a mortal woman, the offspring will grow up to become a mighty hero. In Judeo-Christian media Yahweh is usually invisible or obscured by clouds, but occasionally he takes the form of an old bearded man.	Zeus in Clash of the Titans; Disney's Hercules; Anthony Hopkins as Odin in Thor: Ragnarok; Hera in Jason and the Argonauts; Horus in Gods of Egypt; Jeffrey Hunter as Jesus Christ in King of Kings; Yahweh is heard but never seen in The Ten Commandments; Morgan Freeman as God in Bruce Almighty; Captain Marvel received the powers of Zeus, Hercules, Apollo and Mars from the wizard Shazam
Golden child	In stories about a family or other settings with a mother and / or father figures, then the "golden child" is a child (including a grown-up child), or a subordinate member of a group, who is praised as the "perfect one" / "apple of the parents' eyes", protected from criticism, while their siblings, (or their equivalents), are unnoticed for their achievements and subject to significant chastisement. While this child benefits from positive attention and favoritism, so may become entitled, they are also under a lot of pressure to live up to the parents' expectations. The child archetype is a Jungian the "divine child" archetype. The opposite character is the "whipping boy", who is seen as the person who cannot do anything right, who is blamed for the family's (or organization's) problems and who gets minimum attention and resources.	Princess Ann, played by Audrey Hepburn — the young heir apparent, placed her on a pedestal by her family as the golden child, leaving her feeling stifled by the pressure to be perfect – in the 1953 film Roman Holiday.; Jesse Conrad – believed to be the tulku or reborn great Buddhist teacher by Bhutanese monks – in the 1993 film Little Buddha; The Dursley's biological son Dudley is the golden child, whereas the nephew, Harry Potter, serves as the whipping boy in the Harry Potter book series by J. K. Rowling; The titular character Ray is the golden child, favored by his mother, while his older brother Robert is the ignored scapegoat of the family, in the American television sitcom series Everybody Loves Raymond (1996–2005)
Golem/Homunculus	In Jewish mythology, an inanimate object brought to life by kabbalah magic. It protects its master's family and will avenge him if he is killed in a pogrom. A similar creature is the homunculus or imp created to serve an alchemist or evil wizard and sustained with human blood. Originally these were humanoids made from clay, but in modern entertainment they may also be made from metal, snow or stone.	The Golem and the remake of 2018; Anger of the Golem; The Emperor and the Golem; Golem, a Marvel Comics superhero; A powerful Rock-type Pokémon that is the final evolution of Geodude; The trolls in Lord of the Rings were made from stone and given life by dark magic; Frosty the Snowman; James and the Snowman; Faust successfully creates homunculi after selling his soul to Mephistopheles; The imps that serve Tom Baker in The Golden Voyage of Sinbad; The three creatures unwittingly freed in Don't Be Afraid of the Dark
Goon squad	A group of made men or thugs led by a caporegime who reports to the crime boss. In film noir they are often the first antagonists the private dick must defeat. In comedy they may be bumbling henchmen	Edward G Robinson is a ruthless capo in Little Caesar; Tony Montana is a triggerman who rises to become a crime boss in Scarface; Mad Frankie Frazer is the capo to Billy Hill in Once Upon a Time in London; The strike breakers in F.I.S.T.; The Toon Patrol in Who Framed Roger Rabbit; The Rogues in The Warriors; The Anthill Mob, although the mafia boss Clyde personally oversees things rather than assigning the task to an underboss; Toad is capo of the Schlepper Brothers who serve as henchmen to Mock Swagger; Zorran is the capo to the Z Stacks Zip, Zug and Zebedee; Jesse, James and Meowth of Team Rocket are the goons to crime boss Giovanni
Gracioso	A stock character, popular in 17th-century Spanish literature, who is comically and shockingly vulgar. They were historically used as comic relief "buffoon" characters who played the role of a servant to the leading man. They were often cowardly, lazy, and focused on food.	Clarín, the clown in the 1636 play Life is a dream by Pedro Calderón de la Barca; Examples of similar characters in Anglophone culture include: Bubbles in the television series Trailer Park Boys; Wheeler Walker, Jr., the country musician alter ego of Benjamin Isaac Hoffman; the stand-up persona of Bob Saget; Sir Toby Belch in Twelfth Night
Grande dame/Dowager	A haughty, flamboyant, and elegant woman of the upper classes, prone to extravagant and eccentric fashion – from the French for "great lady". She is a stereotype of an elderly aristocratic widow / high society socialite.	Lady Bracknell in 1895 play The Importance of Being Earnest by Oscar Wilde; Princess Dragomiroff in the 1934 Hercule Poirot crime novel Murder on the Orient Express by Agatha Christie; Lady Constance in the 2001 film Gosford Park by Julian Fellowes; Queen Charlotte in Bridgerton; Lady Maudeline Everglot in Corpse Bride; Lady Caterham in Agatha Christie's Seven Dials
Greeks	The Greek is laid-back and loves dancing and partying, but sometimes has a mean streak and can be very rude. Is often a fisherman, cab driver, olive oil seller, vineyard owner, or bandit. In ancient times, he may be a mathematician, philosopher or inventor with a long white beard. For Greek warriors, see hoplite.	Patrick Troughton in Sinbad and the Eye of the Tiger; Pythagoras in Donald Duck in Mathmagic Land; Gus Portokalos in My Big Fat Greek Wedding; Stelio Kontos in American Dad; Archimedes in Indiana Jones 5; Spiros in The Durrells; Midas Papos in Tintin and the Golden Fleece; Niko in Ill Met By Moonlight; Zorba the Greek
Greaser	A caricature of working-class 1950s American urban youth, with a "tough guy" or "cool" demeanor, usually seen wearing a black leather biker jacket, white t-shirt, blue jeans, and (pertinently) a slick hairdo with generous amounts of pomade. He often has a thick Northeastern ethnic accent hoarse from cigarette smoking, with a love of rock and roll, along with customizing and racing motorcycles or hot rods. The British equivalent is the "rocker". See also Outlaw biker.	Danny Zuko in the 1971 musical Grease; Arthur Fonzarelli in the 1970s American television sitcom series Happy Days; Wade "Cry-Baby" Walker in the 1990 film Cry-Baby; Billy Nolan in the 1974 horror novel Carrie by Stephen King and the film adaptations; Martin Sheen in Badlands and The California Kid; Marlon Brando in The Wild One; Oliver Reed in The Bulldog Breed and The Damned; Duke in Hot Rods to Hell; Richard Lawson in Sometimes They Come Back; Henry Bowers in Stephen King's It
Green Man/Woodwose/Druid	The male counterpart to Mother Nature, a lawless figure associated with forests and wildlife. May be a spirit or deity. If human, he is often a druid, wizard or outlaw living alone in a cave. Is usually bearded and wears green clothing. See also mountain man, hobo and noble savage.	Merlin; Herne the Hunter; Little John; Ghan-Buri-Ghan in Return of the King; Valentine and Orson; Nebuchadnezzar; Sapsorrow in The Storyteller
Grim Reaper	The personification of the angel of death. Generally takes the form of a skeleton in a black cloak on a white horse, but is capable of shapeshifting to any appearance he chooses. Will often make a wager or faustian bargain for the soul of the protagonist.	Grim in The Grim Adventures of Billy and Mandy; Dream of the Endless's sister is Death; The Saint of Killers in Preacher; The titular character in Ghost Rider; Death in The Seventh Seal; Clint Eastwood in Pale Rider; Death in The Storyteller episode "The Soldier and Death".
Grotesque/ Recluse	A deformed or disabled person whose appearance scares strangers or inspires pity, and who may be mistreated. The grotesque is a tragic figure. For villains, see Disfigured villain.	The unnamed monster in the 1818 book Frankenstein by Mary Shelley; Quasimodo in the 1831 book The Hunchback of Notre-Dame by Victor Hugo; Grizabella in the 1981 musical Cats by Andrew Lloyd-Webber, adapted from the 1939 poetry collection Old Possum's Book of Practical Cats of T. S. Eliot; Conrad Veidt as The Man Who Laughs; Lon Chaney as the Phantom of the Opera; Richard Harrow in Boardwalk Empire; The reason Bruce Wayne's old friend Harvey Kent became a criminal after being burned with acid; Ben "The Thing" Grimm in the Fantastic Four by Marvel Comics; Darkman
Gung ho American	A jingoistic US military character who is overly enthusiastic and unquestioningly convinced about the right-mindedness of his nation's warmongering.	Gung-Ho (G.I. Joe) in the G.I. Joe comic series; Peacemaker in the DC Extended Universe of comic books; Chip Hazard in Small Soldiers; George C. Scott as the titular character in Patton; Slim Pickens in Dr. Strangelove; Quaritch in Avatar; Captain America during the Marvel Golden Age
Guru/Fakir/cult leader	A Hindu or Buddhist variant of the wise old man who may have a high pain tolerance or use drugs to see visions of the future. Is usually Indian or an old hippie. May teach yoga or work as a snake charmer. If he is a villain he will often be a charlatan cult leader.	Ben Kingsley as Gandhi; Wotsisnehm in Asterix and the Magic Carpet; Professor Joe in Licence To kill; Robin Williams as Lovelace in Happy Feet; Mike Myers as The Love Guru; The Indian Yogi in Master of the Flying Guillotine; Jimi Mistry as The Guru; Morgan Freeman in The Lego Movie
Gypsy	A nomadic character having an irascible or passionate temper paired with an indomitable love of freedom, who lives in traveling caravans, making a living by playing music, juggling, or dancing. They are often shown using mystical powers of fortune telling, associated with sinister occult tendencies, along with criminal cunning and thievery. Romani women have been portrayed as mysterious, gaudy, exotic, and provocatively sexually available. The "gypsy" stock character is very loosely based upon the Romani people, who were historically and pejoratively known as gypsies. These stereotypical portrayals in popular culture of the Romani are on a par with the racist portrayals of Jewish people, with both groups stereotyped negatively as wandering, spreading disease, abducting children, as well as violating and murdering others. A modern variant is the Irish traveller who loves bare knuckle boxing, poaching and keeping pet dogs. They live in vans rather than wagons, work in construction and often have connections to organised crime.	Carmen in the eponymous novella by Prosper Mérimée and its opera adaption by Georges Bizet; Esmeralda in the 1831 book The Hunchback of Notre-Dame by Victor Hugo; Preciosa, the eponymous 15-year-old little gypsy girl of the 1613 book La Gitanilla by Miguel de Cervantes; Mickey O'Neil in Snatch; The Shelby family in Peaky Blinders; John Moorhouse in King of the Travellers; Michael Gough in No Resting Place

== H ==
Character type	Description	Examples
Hacker	They are technology experts who can exploit vulnerabilities to get into computer networks, even if they have advanced IT security, including passwords and encryption. In cyberpunk stories and thrillers, they are depicted as rebellious young tech wunderkinds who wear a hoodie, black trenchcoat, and spiked or goth hair, and use multiple computer screens, laptops, electronic devices, and racks of powerful, customized computers to bypass IT system security. They may be benevolent ("white hat hacker") or hacktivist types who help law enforcement or act as Robin Hood-style crusaders for justice; chaos-loving types who like doing pranks on big corporations for the "lulz" (or to show off to the hacker community); or malicious ("black hat hacker") types who hack for the highest bidder, even for criminals or terrorists. Given that they typically engage in illegal acts, they use pseudonyms or "handles" which may use L33tspeak. While they tend to be socially awkward loners, they may also work in a hacker collective where each member has special skills (cryptography, hardware hacking, etc.).	In Neuromancer, Case is former hacker and hustler who is blackmailed back into hacking.; In Little Brother, Marcus Yallow is a teen hacker who uses the "handle" "w1n5t0n". He is a "white hat" hacker who exposes government wrongdoing.; In Snow Crash, Hiro Protagonist is a pizza delivery person and freelance hacker who uses his tech skills to explore the metaverse.; In Ready Player One, a hacker with the "handle" Parzival explores the virtual reality named "Oasis" to find a mysterious Easter egg.; In the Millennium Trilogy, Lisbeth Salander is a talented hacker (using the handle "Wasp") who uses her skills to fight injustice.; In The Matrix, Neo is a hacker who uncovers a shocking truth about the world we think we see all around us.; In Johnny Mnemonic, the eponymous character is a data trafficker who has important data stored in his brain.; In Inception, Dom Cobb is a hacker who enters people's dreams to implant memories.; In Murderbot Diaries, a part-cyborg part-humanoid robot security guard hacks its governor module and becomes free from its programmed restrictions.; See also List of fictional hackers.
Halfbreed harlot	This pejorative stereotype of a Mexican prostitute was common in Western films. She is the female counterpart to El bandido, a pejorative stereotype depicting a violent Mexican bandit. The "halfbreed harlot" is a secondary character who is depicted as a lusty nymphomaniac with a hot temper who is a slave to her passions. Filmmakers use the character to serve as a sex object and provide titillation to viewers.	Chihuahua, the girlfriend of Doc Holliday in My Darling Clementine (1946); Helen Ramirez (played by Katy Jurado), a former prostitute and current mistress to one of the characters in High Noon.; Santanico Pandemonium (played by Salma Hayek) in From Dusk till Dawn (1996), a horror film about men trapped in a Mexican saloon who have to defend themselves against a horde of vampires.
Handmaid/Handmaiden	A female personal servant, royal attendant, or concubine in historical, religious, and fantasy fiction. In traditional narratives, she functions as a loyal confidante, lady-in-waiting, or bodyguard/decoy to a noblewoman or monarch. In modern dystopian fiction and popular culture—shaped by Margaret Atwood's 1985 novel The Handmaid's Tale and its 2017 television adaptation—the archetype evolved into a symbol of patriarchal oppression and state-controlled reproduction, depicted as a fertile woman stripped of her identity and enslaved for forced childbearing. A woman cosplaying as a handmaid at the 2018 San Francisco Women's March.	Offred (June Osborne), Ofwarren (Janine), and Ofglen (Emily) in The Handmaid's Tale; Sabé and Padmé Amidala's royal handmaidens in Star Wars: Episode I – The Phantom Menace; Doreah, Irri, and Jhiqui (handmaidens to Daenerys Targaryen) in A Song of Ice and Fire and Game of Thrones; Sook-hee (Nam Sook-hee) in The Handmaiden; Hagar and Bilhah in the Book of Genesis
Hag or Crone	A misogynistic rendering of a cruel, withered old woman, often with occult or witch-like powers of prophecy. As a stock character in a fairytale or folk tale, the hag shares characteristics with the crone, and the two words are sometimes used as if interchangeable. See: Witch	The Three Witches in Macbeth; The Wicked Witch of the Wastes in Howl's Moving Castle; Grotbags; Baba Yaga; The hag who tries to persuade Prince Caspian to resurrect Queen Jadis; The Evil Queen in Snow White takes the form of an old hag with poisoned apples; Tebe, the chief witch in Luna Nera
Hardboiled detective	Typically, a police officer or private investigator — often, a one-time officer unjustly cashiered from the force – rendered bitter and cynical by violence and corruption. They are often hard-drinking antiheroes who use questionable tactics. They are usually the protagonist of hardboiled novels and pulp fiction and of film noir crime movies. Derogatory slang terms for the stereotype are: Gumshoe; Private eye or private dick; Séamus or "shamus" — as very many American police forces recruited heavily from the immigrant Irish community in the late 19th and early 20th century	Sam Spade of the private detective book series by Dashiell Hammett; Philip Marlowe of the private detective book series by Raymond Chandler; Perry Mason of the detective book series by Erle Stanley Gardner; John Rebus of the Scottish detective book series by Sir Ian Rankin; Sam Vimes of the Ankh-Morpork City Watch strand of the Discworld book series by Sir Terry Pratchett; Eddie Ginley portrayed by Albert Finney in the 1971 British black comedy film Gumshoe by Stephen Frears; New York private detective, Shamus McCoy portrayed by Burt Reynolds in the 1973 film Shamus by Buzz Kulik; Lt. Vincent Hanna portrayed by Al Pacino in the 1995 film Heat by Michael Mann
Harlequin/Jester	A clown or professional fool who pokes fun at others, even the elite. Carries a wooden batte and wears a multicoloured patchwork costume with a mask. He is a light-hearted, nimble, and astute servant, often acting to thwart the plans of his master, and pursuing his own love interest, Columbina, with wit and resourcefulness, often competing with the sterner and melancholic Pierrot.	Till Eulenspiegel; Gregory Wolfe played by Robert Powell in the 1980 thriller film Harlequin; Krusty the Clown in the American television animated sitcom series The Simpsons; Harlequin, Pantaloon and Madame Frying Pan appear as supporting characters in Scaramouche; Harley Quinn in Joker 2; The Mysterious Mr Quin; Jinx; The Court Jester; The King's Jester; Alias the Jester
Hawksian woman	This character archetype of the 1930s → 1950s of a tough-talking, self-possessed, and independent woman – a strong film role with much screentime and character development. This stock character sparked against and vied with the male lead role, often Gary Cooper or Cary Grant — and was popularized in the film noir thrillers and screwball comedy films of director Howard Hawks. The Hawksian woman is up-front and frank in speaking her mind, so keeping up with her male counterparts in quick-talking and witty banter – well able to beat a man in verbal sparring – as well as taking action to get what she wants. The archetype was first identified by film critic Naomi Wise in 1971. This character is broadly related to or synonymous with the femme fatale.	Actresses who played Hawksian women include: Jean Arthur and Rita Hayworth in the 1939 film Only Angels Have Wings; Lauren Bacall playing opposite Humphrey Bogart in To Have and Have Not and The Big Sleep; Joan Crawford in the 1933 film Today We Live; Ann Dvorak; Ava Gardner; Katharine Hepburn in the 1938 film Bringing Up Baby; Carole Lombard in the 1934 film Twentieth Century; Rosalind Russell in the 1940 film His Girl Friday; Marilyn Monroe and Jane Russell in the 1953 film Gentlemen Prefer Blondes; Ann Sheridan in the 1949 film I Was a Male War Bride; Barbara Stanwyck in the 1941 film Ball of Fire
Healer	A physician, nurse, barber surgeon or apothecary who provides medical treatment to the main characters. The veterinarian will provide similar care to the protagonist's companion animal. An army medic may be a pacifist or conchie especially during the WWI or WWII era. If modern antibiotics have not yet been invented they will use ointments made from herbs. A quack doctor will sell dangerous fake elixirs. In fantasy, the healer may use both potions and spells.	Richard Boone in Medic; Hattie Jacques in Carry On Matron; Jessica Raine as Jennifer Worth in Call the Midwife; Pam Grier as vigilante nurse Coffy; Andrew Garfield as Desmond Doss in Hacksaw Ridge; James Herriot in All Creatures Great and Small; Doctor Dolittle; Paramedic Jacob Masters in Casualty; Sherlock Holmes' sidekick Doctor John Watson; Robert Finster as the title character in Freud; Elrond and Radagast in the Lord of the Rings; Robert the showman surgeon in Quacks smokes cigarettes and wears filthy bloodstained clothing when operating; The apothecary who provides Romeo Montague with a deadly poison; The charlatan Doc Terminus in Pete's Dragon
Headmaster/Headmistress	The school principal may be a kindly, wise old man or woman who provides guidance to the protagonist, or a terrifying prison warden-type character who uses caning and other types of corporal punishment to keep order. Usually wears a mortarboard and black gown and carries a walking stick as a symbol of authority. May be a witch or wizard if the setting is at a school of magic.	Albus Percival Wulfric Brian Dumbledore; Principal Skeeves in Star vs. the Forces of Evil; Principal Strickland in Back to the Future; Ingrid Schlowsky in Kindergarten Cop; Miss Cackle in The Worst Witch; Miss Grayling in Malory Towers; The evil Wackford Squeers in Nicholas Nickleby; Evelyn Togar in Rock 'n' Roll High School
Hero / heroine	This stock character bravely faces natural or human threats with feats of ingenuity, courage, or strength. The original hero in classical epics did such things for the sake of glory and honor. Post-classical and modern heroes, on the other hand, perform great deeds or selfless acts for the common good or justice instead of the classical goal of wealth, pride, and fame. The antonym is villain. Other terms associated with the concept of hero may include good guy, white hat, superhero and an unconventional subtype, the antihero.	There are many types of fictional heroes, including: action hero, Byronic hero, folk hero, Randian hero, reluctant hero, romantic hero, superheros (heroes with superpowers) and tragic hero.
Hells Angel or outlaw biker	A common antagonist or antihero in movies set in the 1960s and 70s. Is long-haired, bearded, tattooed, rides a chopper bike and has skull patches on his leather jacket and vest. The biker is in a biker gang which hangs out at a clubhouse, strip club, or bar where beer and other intoxicants are consumed.	The Bikeriders; The motorcycle enthusiasts in Wild Hogs; The bikers in Sons of Anarchy; Satan's Sadists; The biker gang in Cannonball Run; Marlon Brando in The Wild One; Peter Fonda and Dennis Hopper in Easy Rider; Wario
Headless horseman	A supernatural villain, often a ghost or revenant who carries his head under his arm. The person who possesses the headless horseman's skull can control him. Another variant is the disembodied head without a body. In modern times he may ride a motorcycle.	Christopher Walken as the headless horseman in Sleepy Hollow; Larry Fessenden in I Sell the Dead; Nearly Headless Nick in Harry Potter; Headless Horseman; The headless horseman in Ask a Policeman; The headless motorcyclist in Durarara!!; Sir Gawain and the Green Knight
Hep cat	The male 1940s hipster counterpart to the Jazz Baby who wears a zoot suit and dances the jitterbug to a swing band. Is often an Italian-American, Hispanic or black American.	Tom as The Zoot Cat; Hoppity in Mr. Bug Goes to Town; The beetle in Thumbelina; The bad duck in The Spirit of '43; Stanley Ipkiss as his alter ego The Mask; El Pachuco in Zoot Suit; Cab Calloway in Stormy Weather; The Russian hipsters in Stilyagi
Himedere	A haughty, theatrical, and demanding character in anime and manga who insists on being treated like royalty by everyone around them, particularly their romantic interest—even if they hold no actual noble title. Beneath her imperious commands and dramatic posturing lies a deep desire for attention and affection.	Erina Nakiri in Food Wars!: Shokugeki no Soma (2012–2019); Mio Isurugi in MM! (2007–2010); Noelle Silva in Black Clover (2015–present); Beatrice in Re:Zero − Starting Life in Another World (2012–present)
Hispanic maid	A Latina middle-aged servant who works for an American middle-class family. Usually, she cannot speak English well, if at all – though sometimes this can be played with, in her abilities being better than her employers' — and is portrayed as being religious and having superstitious beliefs. She is the first person to witness paranormal activities such as ghosts in the house and run away.	Rosalita in the 1985 film The Goonies; Rosario Salazar portrayed by Shelley Morrison in the American television sitcom series Will & Grace; Consuela in the American television animated sitcom series Family Guy; Martine in Paranormal Activity 2; Manuel in Fawlty Towers is the male equivalent
Hippie/ stoner	A liberal, middle class cannabis smoker and music lover who attends art school, drives a VW Bus and follows an Eastern religion such as Hinduism or Buddhism. They travel to psychedelic rock concerts and consume LSD to expand their consciousness. Always with long hair and wears flared trousers, a tie-dye shirt or black turtleneck, sandals and sometimes a beret (to indicate radical chic).	The Beatles in Yellow Submarine; Sunshine in Remember the Titans; Neil in The Young Ones; Shaggy in Scooby-Doo; Dr. Teeth and the Electric Mayhem in The Muppet Movie; Bill and Ted; Sandy Baron as Kip the Hip in Targets; Raymond Briggs in Ethel and Ernest; Tex in Once Upon a Time in Hollywood; Zaphod Beeblebrox in The Hitch-Hiker's Guide to the Galaxy
Historical/Parody/Public domain character	A character from an existing work of fiction or historical events who appears in unrelated media, especially steampunk, anime and sci-fi. For example, Sherlock Holmes might investigate the Jack the Ripper murders with help from Annie Oakley, Tom Brown and Ebenezer Scrooge. Appearances may vary from a brief cameo to a fully developed supporting character. In war films, the villain often reports directly to Adolf Hitler. In comedy, the protagonist may be a parody of a well-known literary character such as James Bond.	The cast of Dickensian; Sherlock Holmes in Without A Clue; Sherlock Holmes in the 22nd Century; Harry Flashman in Royal Flash; The Bloody Red Baron; Tom Sawyer in The Adventures of Mark Twain; Captain Nemo in The League of Extraordinary Gentlemen; Count Dracula in Legend of the Seven Golden Vampires; Abberline in Ripper Street; Ulysses Simpson Grant in The Legend of the Lone Ranger; Austin Powers; Solar Pons; Zorro, The Gay Blade; Adolf Hitler in Indiana Jones and the Last Crusade; Bugs Bunny and Mickey Mouse in Who Framed Roger Rabbit; Charlie Chaplin as a kid in Shanghai Knights
Hobo	A lovable rogue who travels from town to town on foot or by hopping on a freight car to look for odd jobs. Often carries a bindle containing his possessions. Is usually bearded and may have patches on his tattered clothes and holes in his boots. Sleeps rough and survives on strong alcohol and Mulligan stew cooked on a rocket stove made from tin cans. Keeps to himself but is targeted by corrupt cops, brutal railroad conductors and vicious young street hoodlums.	Charlie Chaplin as the Tramp; Lee Marvin in Emperor of the North Pole; The Northing Tramp by Edgar Wallace; Lenny and George in Of Mice and Men; Boxcar Bertha; Snufkin in Moomin; The titular character in Hobo with a Shotgun; Weary Willie the hobo clown; The alcoholic bum whose pants are stolen by Kyle Reese in The Terminator; Miss Mary Shepherd in The Lady in the Van; Trampy in The Shoe People; The old tramp in A Clockwork Orange who is beaten by Alex and his gang of "droogs"
Holmesian detective	A masterful police detective or private investigator who is modelled on the fictional 19th-century detective Sherlock Holmes. These characters may emulate his perceptiveness, intelligence, and use of deductive reasoning.	Dr. John Thorndyke in the early 20th-century detective novels of R. Austin Freeman, contemporaneous with Holmes; Hercule Poirot in the early to mid-20th-century detective novels of Agatha Christie; Detective Columbo as portrayed by Peter Falk in the eponymous 1970s television series; Shinichi Kudo of the manga series Case Closed by Gosho Aoyama; Benoit Blanc in the Knives Out Mysteries by Rian Johnson; Atticus Pund in Magpie Murders
Hooker with a heart of gold	A prostitute who lives on the fringes of the law, most often forced into this by need, but has a good moral compass and intrinsic morality. May also be known as a "tart with a heart". In historical works, her profession may be bowdlerized and disguised to some degree (e.g., as a "dance hall girl").	Nancy in the 1838 novel Oliver Twist by Charles Dickens; Marguerite Gautier in the 1848 novel La Dame aux Camélias by Alexandre Dumas fils and as Violetta Valéry in the 1853 opera La Traviata by Giuseppe Verdi; Fantine in the 1862 novel Les Misérables by Victor Hugo; Sonya in the 1866 novel Crime and Punishment by Fyodor Dostoevsky; Vivian Ward in the 1990 romantic comedy film Pretty Woman; Inara Serra in the television series Firefly by Joss Wheedon
Hopeless romantic	A loving, passionate character who expects to find "love at first sight", who is obsessive over, or the expectation of, a romantic partner / love interest — to the point where it is her or his dominant personality trait. They usually view life optimistically.	Zeppo Marx; Tom Hansen in the 2009 film 500 Days of Summer; Ted Mosby in the American television sitcom series How I Met Your Mother; Raj Koothrappali in the American television sitcom series The Big Bang Theory
Housewife	A stereotypical busy mother of the protagonist family, with a pinned-down and homely appearance, who does the mundane work of running the family home, taking care of the children, and doing the housework.	Jane Jetson in the 1960s American animated television sitcom series The Jetsons; Marge Simpson in the American animated television sitcom series The Simpsons; Morticia Addams created by Charles Addams is an inverted version of the stereotype; Lois Griffin in Family Guy; Francine Smith in American Dad
Hotshot	An action/adventure hero with an impulsive, maverick macho character, known for taking reckless risks and defying authority. Popular in American films and TV series.	Bret Maverick portrayed by James Garner in the American Western series Maverick; James T. Kirk in the American television and film series Star Trek; Axel Foley in the 1980s American film series Beverly Hills Cop; Martin Riggs in the 1980s American film series Lethal Weapon; Agent J in the 1990s–2000s American film series Men in Black
Human trafficker/Slave owner	A cruel villain who profits from enslaving black people or other marginalized groups, such as immigrants or sex workers. May be a plantation owner or a modern-day human smuggler who promises refugees a better life only to force them to do unpaid work to pay off their debt.	The villains of Shaft in Africa; Bossk in Star Wars; Roderick's deceased father David Usher in House of Usher; Mary Anne in Prime Cut; Allan in The Red Sea Sharks; Edward Brodess in Harriet; Edwin Epps in 12 Years a Slave; Raymond Cobb in The Birth of a Nation
Hun	A villainous aristocratic German officer from the World War I or World War II era, often wears a monocle and has a dueling scar on his face. Is fond of Wagner's operas. If he is an antagonistic fighter pilot he may follow a similar code of chivalry to the British or American hero.	Erich Von Stroheim as Erwin Rommel in Five Graves to Cairo; Colonel Vogel in Indiana Jones; Colonel Sponsz in The Calculus Affair is the Stalinist equivalent; Captain Nazi from the Captain Marvel comics; Ralph Fiennes as Amon Goth in Schindler's List; Erich von Stalhein in Biggles

== I ==
Character type	Description	Examples
Ice cream man/soda jerk	A friendly character known to all the kids. Is usually an Italian-American. Serves refreshing ice cream, egg cream or soda pop at a diner or from the back of his ice cream van. If he is of an unsavory temperament he may also be a drug dealer.	Bugsy in Bugs Bunny Nips the Nips; Reggie Bannister in Phantasm; Jolly Ollie in Hey Arnold; The ice cream man in Assault on Precinct 13; Clint Howard in Ice Cream Man; Sweet Tooth in Twisted Metal; Donald Duck in The Band Concert
Ice King	A villain with the ability to manipulate ice and cold, either with technology or supernatural powers. A male villain with ice powers is usually a megalomaniac who seeks world domination or to advance an eco-terrorist ideology.	Ice King in Adventure Time; Mr Freeze in Batman; Ymir in Thor; White Walkers in Game of Thrones; Blue Snowman in Wonder Woman; Professor Coldheart in Care Bears
Ice queen	A cold, emotionally detached, and unapproachable woman who hides behind a facade of strict professionalism, aristocratic aloofness, or cynicism. Often appearing as a demanding boss, rival, or reluctant love interest, she is frequently depicted as needing a warm, persistent protagonist to "melt" her emotional barriers, though in some narratives her coldness masks deep trauma or ruthless ambition.	Estella Havisham in Great Expectations (1861) by Charles Dickens; Miranda Priestly in The Devil Wears Prada (2006); Elsa in Frozen (2013); Beth Harmon in The Queen's Gambit (2020)
Idiot savant	A person with extraordinary genius in a narrow area who has a social or developmental disability, often consistent with being somewhere on the autism spectrum.	Forrest Gump in the 1986 book Forrest Gump by Winston Groom; Raymond Babbitt, played by Dustin Hoffman, in the 1988 film Rain Man; Nick Massi as portrayed in the film and musical Jersey Boys; Abed Nadir, played by Danny Pudi, in the American television sitcom series Community; Shaun Murphy, played by Freddie Highmore, in the American television series The Good Doctor
Igor / Ygor	The protagonist or antagonist mad scientist's assistant, who often is afflicted with many physical problems, typically: a short stature, a dragging walking pace, a pronounced hunched back, speaks in a halted speech pattern or a low monotone accent, and an obtuse demeanor — embodied in Dwight Frye's interpretation of the role in the 1931 film version of Frankenstein, and by similar characters played by Peter Lorre in subsequent films. Though inspired by the assistant to Victor Frankenstein, in Mary Shelley's novel there was no such character, and this role originated instead in an early stage adaptation of the story who also was originally named Fritz.	Eyegor as portrayed by Marty Feldman in Mel Brooks and Gene Wilder's 1974 film Young Frankenstein; Riff Raff as portrayed by Richard O'Brien in his 1973 musical The Rocky Horror Show; Igor leading character in the 2008 animated film Igor; Dr Nefario in the animated film series Despicable Me; The race of Igors, who are all called Igor or Igorina, in the Discworld book series, where the stereotype is heavily lampooned by Sir Terry Pratchett; Dr. Neo Cortex's cyborg assistant Dr. N. Gin in Crash Bandicoot; Victor's childhood friend Edgar in Frankenweenie
Idol	A young, energetic pop singer, dancer, or media personality in anime and manga whose image centers on innocence, relentless positivity, and emotional accessibility to fans. Stories featuring idols often contrast their sparkling, idealized stage personas with the grueling training, strict industry rules, and intense emotional pressure behind the scenes.	Lynn Minmay in Super Dimension Fortress Macross (1982–1983); Mima Kirigoe in Perfect Blue (1997); Honoka Kōsaka in Love Live! School Idol Project (2013–2014); Ai Hoshino in Oshi no Ko (2020–2024)
Imaginary friend	The invisible companion of a lonely, misunderstood person, often a child. May be a vivid daydream from an active imagination, a hallucination from a mental health disorder, a stuffed toy that comes to life, a legendary creature that becomes visible to those who believe in it, or a malevolent demon trying to possess the child and enter the human world.	Elliot in Pete's Dragon; Pooh Bear in The Many Adventures of Winnie-the-Pooh; Calvin and Hobbes; Max's friends in Where the Wild Things Are; Ted; Frank in Donnie Darko; Adolf Hitler as portrayed in Jojo Rabbit; Bloo in Foster's Home For Imaginary Friends; Rik Mayall as the title character in Drop Dead Fred; Ralph Wiggum's leprechaun in The Simpsons; The Great Gazoo in The Flintstones; Snuffleupagus in Sesame Street
Immigrant/Refugee	A character from a foreign land whose bizarre manners, quirky behavior, and unusual traditions often clash humorously with Western cultural norms. The characters may unintentionally violate social taboos or make cultural malapropisms and their struggle with their new language may be a source of comic relief.	Luigi Basco in the American radio sitcom series Life with Luigi; Latka Gravas, played by Andy Kaufman, in the American television sitcom series Taxi; Balki Bartokomous in the American television sitcom series Perfect Strangers; Fez in the American television sitcom series That '70s Show; Borat Sagdiyev, played by Sacha Baron Cohen, in the film Ali G Indahouse and Borat spin-off film series; Eddie Murphy in Coming to America; Jackie Chan in Rush Hour; Leningrad Cowboys Meet Moses; Paddington Bear, an anthropomorphized bear from the jungles of Peru who is taken to urban England
Immortal	A person who can't die, either as a reward or punishment. A villainous immortal will often be a tyrant, dark lord or supervillain. If he is killed or his body is destroyed he may regenerate or return as a clone. If the immortal is a chosen one or Christ figure, he will return to life until he has finished the task assigned to him by the gods.	Vigo the Carpathian in Ghostbusters 2; Ming the Merciless in Flash Gordon; Vandal Savage; Dorian Gray; Vanderdecken of the Flying Dutchman; Gandalf the White in The Two Towers; Doctor Who; Tuck Everlasting; Connor MacLeod in Highlander
Imposter/False hero	A variant of the con artist who impersonates the real hero for fame, notoriety or profit. Sometimes he is a villain seeking to discredit or entrap the hero.	The Mandarin in Iron Man 3; The fake Superman in Showdown; Loki; Cinderella's ugly sisters; The Big Bad Wolf impersonating Red Riding Hood's grandmother; Eddie Brock in Spider-Man; Hal Stewart in Megamind; Mystique in the X-Men; Barty Crouch impersonating Mad-Eye Moody in Harry Potter and the Goblet of Fire; Mimikyu in Pokémon
Impotent character	This is a man (or less commonly, a woman) who is facing sexual dysfunction due to physical, psychological or emotional issues. An impotent character may feel sexually inadequate or ashamed due to their condition. In some works, the impotence may be depicted more indirectly by having the character in a wheelchair or losing their teeth. In comedies, a character’s impotence is typically played for laughs, but in dramas, it can be used to show a character’s vulnerability, wounded ego, and frustration and explore themes of emasculation or powerlessness. A variant in horror and crime procedurals is the impotent serial killer who has physical or psychological problems with sex, so they engage in horrific violence to assert control over women.	In Ernest Hemingway's 1926 novel The Sun Also Rises, Jake Barnes is impotent due to an injury from WWI, but this is a broader metaphor for the spiritual emptiness faced by shell-shocked veterans.; In Toni Morrison's novel The Bluest Eye, Cholly cannot perform sexually, an issue which is tied into decay and loss of teeth, which symbolizes emasculation or impotence.; In Dr. Strangelove, General Ripper goes mad after becoming impotent, which he blames on Communists putting fluoride in the water and harming his “precious bodily fluids.”; In 30 Rock in the episode "Reaganing", Liz Lemon faces sexual performance difficulties with several boyfriends due to a traumatic sexual experience in her past which keeps coming into her mind.; In Alfred Hitchcock's film Rear Window, the protagonist L.B. Jeffries (James Stewart) is a photographer who is in a wheelchair at home due to an injury, so he spends his days peering through his camera at the lives of others. His injury and powerlessness is used to symbolize his passivity and impotence in his relationship with his beautiful fiancée, Lisa Fremont (Grace Kelly).; In Eyes Wide Shut, a wealthy doctor, Bill Harford (Tom Cruise) feels sexually inadequate and emasculated after his wife tells him about a fantasy of being with another man.; In A Beautiful Mind (2001), the brilliant mathematician John Forbes Nash faces erectile dysfunction due to antipsychotic medications he is taking.; In Sex, Lies and Videotape (1989), Graham (James Spader) is impotent, but he is obsessed with being a sexual voyeur, as recording women talking about sex gives him a sense of power.; In 12 Years a Slave, the sadistic slave owner Edwin Epps (Michael Fassbender) is angry, lonely, and impotent.; In the film Shakespeare in Love (1998), the titular character has been struggling with erectile dysfunction and writer’s block with his next play, but when he falls in love with Viola, he regains his sexual abilities and his creative spark, as he has found his inspirational muse.; In the monster romance novel Berries and Greed by Lily Mayne, the female main character, Beryl, has vaginismus, which makes sexual intercourse painful or impossible. With her non-human lover, Greid, she explores other non-intercourse sexual activities.
Incompetent military officer	Usually from a wealthy background, the incompetent hidebound officer is usually senior to the hero – with whom he is often at cross-purposes – and an antagonist in military fiction. The incompetence is depicted either as stemming from a blinkered viewpoint, blind innocence, their appointment being based on favoritism or political connections, or fundamental stupidity. There is some overlap with Upper-class twit.	Gen. Amos T. Halftrack in the American cartoon strip Beetle Bailey from 1950 by Mort Walker; Col. Wainright Purdy III in the 1951 novel Teahouse of the August Moon by Vern Sneider; Cpt. Cooney played by Eddie Albert in the 1956 film Attack; Gen. Paul Mireau played by George Macready in the 1957 film Paths of Glory; Lord Cardigan played by Trevor Howard in the 1968 film The Charge of the Light Brigade; The 1964 satirical film Dr Strangelove or: How I Learned to Stop Worrying and Love the Bomb is fully populated by variants on this trope with: Gp Cpt. Lionel Mandrake, the effete British RAF exchange officer played by Peter Sellers; Gen. Buck Turgidson, the libidinous US Chairman of the Joint Chiefs of Staff, obsessed with reliving his war experiences, played by George C. Scott; Brig. Gen. Jack D. Ripper, the insanely paranoid commander of Burpelson US Air Force Base, obsessed with the purity of "precious bodily fluids", played by Sterling Hayden; Maj. T.J. "King" Kong, a US B-52 bomber's commander and pilot, obsessed with being a gun-toting Wild West hero, played by Slim Pickens; Lt Steven Hauk, played by Bruno Kirby in the 1987 American war comedy film Good Morning, Vietnam
Indian or South Asian person	Works as a shopkeeper, talks with a heavy accent and loves Bollywood music. Has a wife who usually wears a bindi and saree, and many kids who work with him in the shop. Has immense pride in his culture and traditions but often bickers with his sons if they behave in a westernised manner or date girls he disapproves of. Is very thrifty and lives in a house (normally above the shop) that still has the wallpaper he pasted on during the 1970s. If he is a Hindu, he will display an idol of Ganesh in his store. Travels by elephant or Hindustan Ambassador.	Om Puri as George Khan in East Is East; Apu Nahasapeemapetilon in The Simpsons; Suki Panesar in EastEnders; Dev Alahan in Coronation Street; Quick Gun Murugun's uncle; The father in Goodness Gracious Me who believes Indians invented everything
Informant	These are typically morally ambiguous, shifty characters who are hard to trust, as they are betraying their crime boss for a range of motivations. They may lie for the payout, reduced criminal charges, or to take out a rival, and they have divided loyalties, so law enforcement view them as unreliable. Some informants are torn by a guilty conscience, but others may feel that selling out their bosses is justified by their mistreatment. Since crime bosses view informing as treachery, informants are nervous and stressed. While they are often low-level criminals, some are homeless people or everyday workers (e.g., taxi drivers or bartenders) who act as a detective's “eyes on the street”, and, on the other end of the spectrum, some are high-ranking criminals who help police because they want to leave the life of crime, avoid jail, or settle scores. Another variant is the mysterious informant, a highly placed, anonymous whistleblower who reveals corruption. The knowledge broker is an elite, powerful figure who buys information and intelligence from lower-ranking informants and sells it to the highest bidder. In prison films the stool pigeon is unpopular for ratting out the other prisoners. He will often get preferential treatment from the guards.	In The Informer, a 1925 novel by Liam O'Flaherty, Gypo Nolan is an IRA fighter who betrays a fellow IRA member in Dublin.; In Informer, Raza is a British-Pakistani man who is pushed into working undercover for a counter-terrorism officer.; In The Departed (2006), a mob member infiltrates the police department and an FBI informant gets into the mob.; In Goodfellas, when mobster Henry Hill is caught by police, he testifies against the mob and goes into Witness Protection.; In The Godfather Part II, Fredo Corleone, the older brother of Michael Corleone, becomes an informant and betrays his family when he shares information with a rival organized crime group.; In American Gangster, Harlem drug lord Frank Lucas is arrested and makes a deal to reveal corrupt police officers to reduce his prison sentence.
Ingénue	An attractive young woman who is endearingly innocent, naive and wholesome who is the romantic object of desire for the hero. Her lack of sophistication and cunning is often used as a contrast with the seductive, manipulative vamp/femme fatale character. The ingénue's naïvety frequently makes her vulnerable to the "bad boy"/cad, as she cannot understand that the intentions of others are not as pure as her own. The ingénue is thus closely linked with the "damsel In distress" trope.	The Disney Princesses; Dorothy Gale in the 1900 novel The Wonderful Wizard of Oz by Frank L. Baum; Sandy Dumbrowski / Olsson in the 1971 musical Grease; Keira Knightley in The Curse of the Black Pearl; Jennifer Connelly in Labyrinth; Robin Wright as The Princess Bride
Innocent/ Manchild	A character, often a child (or a child-like adult) who shows moral purity, kindness, and goodness. They may be naive, vulnerable, and afraid of abandonment. Despite having almost all positive traits, they do have some issues; with their sunny outlook, they may be blind to risks or unaware of the ploys of deceitful characters.	Tiny Tim in the 1843 book A Christmas Carol by Charles Dickens; Lennie Small in the 1937 book Of Mice and Men by John Steinbeck; Buddy the Elf in the 2003 Christmas film Elf; Peter Pan in the eponymous 1904 play and 1911 book by J.M. Barrie; Johnny Depp as Edward Scissorhands; Blaster in Mad Max 3
Imōto (Little sister)	A younger sister character archetype in anime and manga, typically depicted as either relentlessly cheerful, clingy, and idolizing her older brother, or sharply sarcastic and tsundere toward him. Serving as a domestic anchor or comedic foil, she frequently motivates the protagonist's protective instincts. See also Youngest child.	Nezuko Kamado in Demon Slayer: Kimetsu no Yaiba (2016–2020); Kagura (surrogate little sister variation) in Gintama (2003–2019); Komachi Hikigaya in My Youth Romantic Comedy Is Wrong, As I Expected (2011–2021); Umaru Doma in Himouto! Umaru-chan (2013–2017); Dororo; Lynn in Fist of the North Star; Mei in My Neighbor Totoro; Setsuko in Grave of the Fireflies
Invisible man	A person who can make themselves invisible with a magical object or spellas the result of a mutation. Often works as a professional thief or superhero.	The Invisible Man; the Invisible Woman in Fantastic Four; Alberich in Das Rheingold; Perseus; Faust; Fantomcat; Danny Phantom; Frodo Baggins in Lord of the Rings; Sebastian Caine in Hollow Man; Harry Potter
Irish mammy	This is a cultural stereotype used in Ireland to describe Irish mothers of a traditionally matriarchal style, who exhibit traits of over-protection or servitude towards their children or domestic visitors in general, but can also be exacting when needed.	* Bridget (played by Jennifer Zamparelli), in the sitcom Bridget & Eamon (2016): Agnes Loretta Brown (played by Brendan O'Carroll), in the sitcom Mrs. Brown's Boys (2011–present); Bridget Fagan Brown (played by Brenda Fricker), in My Left Foot (1989); Biddy Byrne (played by Mary McEvoy), in the Irish soap opera Glenroe (1983–2001); Kay Curley (played by Ruth McCabe), in The Snapper (1993); Rita Doyle (played by Jean Costello), in the Irish soap opera Fair City (1989–2013); Anne Flanagan (played by Sean 'Hog' Flanagan), of the Irish comedy sketch group Foil Arms and Hog (2008–present); Mary Riordan (played by Moira Deady), in the television series The Riordans (1965–1979); Carmel Walsh (played by Philippa Dunne), in the sitcom The Walshes (2014)
Irish person	During the vaudeville era, the Irish stereotype was developed where it was called "stage Irish". It was an "exaggerated caricature of supposedly Irish characteristics in speech and behavior, which depicted Irish people as "garrulous, boastful, unreliable, hard-drinking, belligerent (though cowardly), and chronically impecunious". In 1920s-era films, Irish characters were "fighters, gangsters, rebels, or priests". In the 1950s, Hollywood films depicted Irish women as an "Irish colleen" with a "feisty independent spirit." In the 1990s and 2000s, a new stereotype emerged: the "Irish male as a romantic ideal", with a soft, "soulful and poetic" demeanor. During that same era, another Irish male stereotype emerged: the balaclava-wearing IRA bomb-maker or fighter, sometimes with an "indecipherable, tongue-twister accent".	All the forms of the exaggerated caricature / stereotype are heavily lampooned and deconstructed in the 1990s television sitcom series Father Ted.: Paddy Tanniger in the American television animated sitcom series Family Guy; The leprechauns in Darby O'Gill and the Little People; The ensemble cast of Derry Girls, a period teen sitcom set in Derry, Northern Ireland; Sean Wallace in Gangs of London comes from a family of Irish traveller gangsters.; The Kinsellas and Cunninghams are two rival Irish crime families in Kin; Sean Bean is an Irish Republican terrorist in Patriot Games
Israelis	Similar to the South African and American rancher, a Jewish settler of European descent who lives on a kibbutz, carries an uzi and is skilled in the martial arts. Often has previous military experience in a special forces unit and may work for Mossad as a Nazi hunter or counterterrorism agent.	Eyal in Walk on Water; Mordecai Ben Ze'ev in Out of Evil; Moshiko in Stalin's Disciples; Hannah in A Beautiful Valley; Anda in Unsettled Land; Nancy in Goodbye, New York
Italian-American person	Italian-American stereotypes depict men with "over-the-top gaudy couture", an "insatiable libido that will sooner or later lead to infidelity", "temper problems", a lifestyle of "vanity and violence", "tough", "uneducated", involved in "illegal activities, like bribery", and having "connections to the Mafia". Italian-American women are depicted as "vain, hot-tempered, [and] power-hungry."	Characters in American mafia films and series: The Godfather; Goodfellas; Casino; The Sopranos; Loretta Castorini and her mother, Rose, played by non–Italian Americans Cher and Olympia Dukakis in the 1987 film Moonstruck portray non-stereotypical characters amongst others that do conform.: Jersey Shore; The Real Housewives of New Jersey; Frankie Valli and Tommy DeVito as portrayed in Jersey Boys

== J ==
Character type	Description	Examples
Jamaican or Afro-Caribbean person	Is often a rude boy in a mohair suit or a rastafarian with dreadlocks. Uses pidgin English slang, eats goat curry, smokes ganja and loves reggae. May be an aspiring musician, artist or athlete living in Kingston or London who wants to escape the slums infested with yardies and roadmen armed with machetes.	Horsemouth Wallace in Rockers; Kingsley Ben-Adir in Bob Marley: One Love; The bobsleigh team in Cool Runnings and the dog sledders in Sun Dogs; In Top Boy, Dushane, Sully, Dris, Jamie, and Jacq are the children of Jamaican immigrants; Jamaican gangsters are the villains in Predator 2; Darlene Cake in Bad Girls; Aml Ameen in Yardie; The Shelby family's priest Jeremiah Jesus in Peaky Blinders
Janitor/ Housekeeper	The caretaker of a school, apartment block, hotel, public building or theatre. Is often black or Hispanic. May have a secret identity such as a superhero, or a dream to leave his job and become famous. A janitor with good repair skills may be promoted to building superintendent. The female equivalent is the house keeper or charwoman.	Hong Kong Phooey; Linguini in Ratatouille; The Toxic Avenger; Fizzy in Bugsy Malone; Bruno in Dog City; Mrs Mopp in It's That Man Again; Mrs Thursday; Hepzibah Green in Carrie's War; Mrs Hudson in Sherlock Holmes; American Maid in The Tick; Maya in Bread and Roses; Mrs Doyle in Father Ted; The evil Mrs Wickens in The Amazing Mr. Blunden
Japanese person	During the 1940s first and second generation Japanese immigrants in America were represented as treacherous fifth columnists, while Imperial Japanese Army troops in the Pacific were depicted as fanatical, deceitful and cruel (as in real life). From 1945 through the 1960s, Hollywood cinema propagated a racist stereotype depicting Japanese men as a "pint-sized man wearing black-framed spectacles, with protuberant incisors", like the "klutzy photographer Mr. Yunioshi in Breakfast at Tiffany's" whereas Japanese women are depicted with the traits of the geisha: "feminine, subservient, eager and willing to please males". White actors in make-up to try to make them appear as Far East Asian – in what has come to be known as "yellow-facing" — were typically cast in Asian roles until the 1960s. By the 1970s and 1980s, Japanese people started being portrayed as a "fusion of tradition and high tech", with the historical references being to ninja and samurai, which are both "part of the 'mysterious East'" (e.g. Gung Ho (1986)). Depictions of Japanese people also link them to sumo wrestling, kabuki, or eating sushi.	Bridge on the River Kwai; Empire of the Sun; Bugs Bunny Nips the Nips; Sakini played by Marlon Brando in the 1956 film The Teahouse of the August Moon; Mr. Yunioshi played by Mickey Rooney in the 1961 film Breakfast at Tiffany's; The 1986 American comedy film Gung Ho; The 1989 American neo-noir thriller film Black Rain
Jazz Baby/ Flapper	In media set during the Roaring Twenties, a young socialite who loves cocktail parties and dancing. Has a bob cut and wears a very short dress. Is sometimes an amateur detective. Flappers were seen as brash for wearing excessive makeup, drinking alcohol, smoking cigarettes in public, driving automobiles, treating sex in a casual manner, and otherwise flouting social and sexual norms. A bad girl may be a gangster's moll.	Betty Boop; Nancy Drew; Audrey Hepburn in Breakfast at Tiffany's; The cast of Bright Young Things; Clara Bow in the Saturday Night Kid; Jean Harlow in The Public Enemy; Ivy in Lackadaisy; Renee Zellweger in Chicago; Bundle Brent in Agatha Christie's Seven Dials
Jekyll and Hyde/Schizo/Psychopath	A villain with two or more distinct personalities, one good and the other evil. May help the heroes until the evil personality emerges. Is often a serial killer, outcast or inmate at a mental hospital. Sometimes the personality change is triggered by a mutation or experimental drug. Less commonly, this character may be a superhero alter ego whose courageous and assertive personality is repressed by his passive one.	Gollum in Lord of the Rings; John Hannah as Dr. Jekyll; Anthony Hopkins in Edge of Sanity; Harvey Kent; Norman Bates in Bates Motel; Jame Gumb in The Silence of the Lambs; Phantom Fink/Captain Good in Yogi's Space Race; Tweety Pie in Hide and Go Tweet; Bruce Banner; Captain Chaos in Cannonball Run 2
Jews	Stereotypes of Jews in literature have changed over the centuries. While there are some sympathetic Jewish characters in fiction, there have been recurrent pejorative and racist anti-Semitic Jewish stereotypes in literature from the Medieval era until the 20th century, often as misers or money lenders. The first generation of Jewish-American authors presented "realistic portrayals" of Jewish immigrants presenting a sympathetic rendering of Jewish characters with proto-Zionist and Kaballistic ideas.	Anti-Semitic portrayals: The Faust legend version from 1587 has Faust borrow money from a Jew, who demands one of Faust's legs as security for the debt.; Barabas, the merchant in the 1590 play The Jew of Malta by Christopher Marlowe; Shylock the moneylender in the play The Merchant of Venice by William Shakespeare.; The greedy banker and art collector character in the book series La Comédie humaine by Honoré de Balzac; Fagin, the leader of a den in the 1838 book Oliver Twist by Charles Dickens; Svengali, the hypnotist and manipulator in the 1894 novel Trilby by George du Maurier; Veitel Itzig, the greedy and immoral Jewish businessman antagonist in the 1855 novel Debit and Credit by Gustav Freytag; Jewish characters are portrayed sympathetically: Riah as a paragon of virtue in 1865 book Our Mutual Friend by Charles Dickens; Anton Trendelssohn in the 1867 novel Nina Balatka by Anthony Trollope; Daniel Deronda in the eponymous 1876 novel of George Eliot.
Jewish American Princess	A pejorative stereotype of well-off young women at Jewish "summer camps, Hebrew schools, [and] the suburbs of New Jersey" with a focus on grooming (flat-ironed hair), trendiness, "upmarket loungewear", luxury brands (Neiman Marcus, Filene's, etc.) "entitled dispositions toward luxury", and a liking for ease and comfort. They often engage in "manipulation and acquisitiveness" and they may act spoiled or engage in "pouting, complaining, [and] cajoling."	Marjorie Morningstar in the eponymous 1955 novel by Herman Wouk; Philip Roth's 1959 novella Goodbye, Columbus; Cher Horowitz played by Alicia Silverstone in the 1995 film Clueless; Miriam "Midge" Maisel played by Rachel Brosnahan in the American TV series The Marvelous Mrs. Maisel
Jewish mother	A nagging, loud, highly-talkative, overprotective, smothering, and overbearing mother, who persists in interfering in her children's lives long after they have become adults and is excellent at making her children feel guilty for actions that may have caused her to suffer.	Molly Goldberg in the American radio series The Goldbergs; Auntie Nelda in the American television and film series of Ernest P. Worrell; Sheila Broflovski in the American television animated sitcom series South Park; Mrs Wolowitz in the American television sitcom series The Big Bang Theory
Jock	A popular American high school or college athlete stereotype who is focused on sports competitions, working out and hook ups with cheerleaders. He tends to be better at physical skills than in the classroom, so he may get the Nerd or the wholesome Girl next door to do his homework. He often bullies the nerds and is the boyfriend of the school diva or head cheerleader.	Brom Bones in the 1820 book The Legend of Sleepy Hollow by Washington Irving; Flash Thompson in the Spider-Man comic books; Nathan Scott in the American television series One Tree Hill
Judge	Wears a powdered wig, carries a gavel and is fond of snuff. May be a kindly old man who gives the juvenile delinquent a second chance, or a stern disciplinarian who hands out unduly harsh sentences for minor crimes. Often has a prominent chin. May order the local doctor or coroner to perform an autopsy on a murder victim. In Western movies the hanging judge is a common supporting character.	Paul Newman in The Life and Times of Judge Roy Bean; Officer Short-Shrift in The Phantom Tollbooth is judge, traffic cop and jailer, like Judge Dredd.; Hal O'Hobb is the gnomes' judge and mayor in The Forest of Boland Light Railway.; Christopher Lee as Judge Jeffries, the Bloody Judge.; Martin Shaw as Judge John Deed.; The magistrate who imprisons Mr Toad for car theft in the Wind in the Willows.
Judas/ traitor	These characters, named after the Biblical character Judas Iscariot who betrayed Jesus, are traitors or turncoats who sell out their comrades to the enemy for profit or advancement, or out of spite.	Lando Calrissian in the 1980 Star Wars film, The Empire Strikes Back, (betrays rebel leaders Han Solo, and Princess Leia to Darth Vader); Cypher in the 1999 film The Matrix betrays Morpheus, Trinity, and Neo to the enemy "machines"; Carter Burke, the representative of the biotechnology company in the 1986 film Aliens betrays Ripley and the space marines sent on the rescue mission; Dennis Nedry in Jurassic Park; Elsa Schneider in Indiana Jones 3; Lotso in Toy Story 3; Ernesto in Coco; Mary Queen of Scots in Elizabeth: The Golden Age; Colonel Brand in Sharpe's Mission
Jungle boy/ feral child	A man who is separated from his parents as a very young boy and raised in the wild by animals. Despite isolation from civilization and lack of grasp of language, the jungle boy has an innate sense of civilization and morality and is usually portrayed heroically. See also: Noble savage	Mowgli in the majority of the tales in the 1894—1895 set of short stories, The Jungle Books by Rudyard Kipling; Tarzan in the eponymous book series from 1914 by Edgar Rice Burroughs; Bomba, the Jungle Boy series of books; George of the Jungle in the eponymous American television animated sitcom series; Romulus and Remus
Jungle girl	An adventurous, athletic heroine raised in or inhabiting a tropical wilderness, typically clad in animal-skin garments and possessing an innate bond with wild animals. Emerging in early 20th-century pulp magazines and adventure comics as a female counterpart to Tarzan, she acts as a fierce protector of her jungle home against poachers, smugglers, and colonial invaders.	Sheena, Queen of the Jungle in Jumbo Comics (1937–present); Rima the Jungle Girl in Green Mansions (1904) by W. H. Hudson; Shanna the She-Devil in Marvel Comics (1972–present); Jana of the Jungle in Jana of the Jungle (1978); Atalanta the heroine of Greek mythology; Wonder Woman in the eponymous comic book series; Princess Mononoke; Rima in Green Mansions; Ajor in The People That Time Forgot; Daryl Hannah in Clan of the Cave Bear

== K ==
Character type	Description	Examples
Kamidere	An arrogant, narcissistic, and megalomaniacal character archetype in anime and manga who genuinely believes themselves to be a deity or superior being destined to rule or reshape the world. Combining grand theatrical speeches with brilliant intellect or overwhelming power, the character views ordinary humans as pawns while occasionally hiding a warped sense of justice.	Light Yagami in Death Note (2003–2006); Lelouch Lamperouge (Zero persona) in Code Geass (2006–2008); Gilgamesh in Fate/stay night (2004); Haruhi Suzumiya (unconscious variation) in Haruhi Suzumiya (2003–present)
Karen	A pejorative stock character and satirical archetype depicting an entitled, demanding, and confrontational middle-class white woman who weaponizes social privilege, rigid adherence to rules, and theatrical outrage to control others. Originating in late-2010s internet culture and quickly adopted into television comedy and social satire, the character is typically distinguished by an asymmetrical bob haircut, condescending demeanor, and a catchphrase demand to "speak to the manager." In narrative fiction, the archetype functions as an antagonistic busybody, homeowners association tyrant, or customer-service nightmare who escalates minor inconveniences into public spectacles.	Kate Gosselin (real-world reality television persona associated with the hairstyle and trope) in Jon & Kate Plus 8 (2007–2009); Helen Lovejoy (proto-archetype busybody) in The Simpsons (1990–present); Beverly Hofstadter (academic variation) and Mrs. Fowler in The Big Bang Theory (2007–2019); Susan Ross's mother and various retail antagonists in Curb Your Enthusiasm (2000–2024); Karen Van Der Beek in Californication (2007–2014); Linda Belcher's rival Colleen Caviello in Bob's Burgers (2011–present); Satirical sketches on Saturday Night Live (e.g., "The Karen" and "Can I Speak to the Manager?" sketches)
Keystone Cop	A bumbling, incompetent American police officer or squad, named after the Keystone Cops comic silent film series inspired in good part by the Los Angeles police of the early 20th century, which did not have professional training of recruits until 1916. They show a great deal of action as they pursue a criminal, but they are uncoordinated and the attempt ends in chaos. Modern types may be depicted as lazy, overweight, and with a predilection for donuts. If set in the southern United States, the character is usually also portrayed as racist, corrupt and lacking regard for the rights of whom he is accusing.	Barney Fife in the 1960s American television The Andy Griffith Show sitcom series; Officer Charlie Dibble in the 1960s American television animated sitcom series Top Cat; Sheriff Rosco P. Coltrane in the 1980s American television action-comedy series The Dukes of Hazzard; Chief Clancy Wiggum in the American television animated sitcom series The Simpsons; Sheriff J. W. Pepper in James Bond films; Buford T. Justice in Smokey and the Bandit; The cast of Police Academy
Knight-errant	A noble knight on a quest for his Lady or who is seeking some object of significant, such as the Holy Grail. He expresses his courtly love for his beloved from afar. See also: Xiake	Sir Lancelot du Lac in the King Arthur legends; Aragorn in the 1954 book The Lord of the Rings by J.R.R. Tolkien; Bronn in the saga of A Song of Ice and Fire book series by George R.R. Martin; Jack Reacher, as a modern version as the protagonist of the series of crime thriller novels by Lee Child
Kuudere	A Japanese manga and anime character, who is known for displaying a withdrawn or unemotional demeanor concealing a warmer side to their personality, in contrast to tsundere and yandere characters.	Rei Ayanami in the Neon Genesis Evangelion series; Battle Angel Alita a.k.a. Gunnm in the 1990s Business Jump manga magazines; KOS-MOS in the video game Xenosaga; 2B android in the 2017 video game Nier: Automata

== L ==
Character type	Description	Examples
Lady-in-waiting	A noblewoman who attends a queen, princess, or high-ranking aristocratic lady in royal courts and historical dramas. Serving as a loyal confidante, moral sounding board, and emotional anchor to the monarch, she frequently assists in secret romances, navigates court intrigue, or acts as a sharp-witted observer of aristocratic hypocrisy. In darker political thrillers, the archetype occasionally shifts into an ambitious schemer or royal spy.	Emilia to Desdemona in Othello by William Shakespeare; Nerissa to Portia in The Merchant of Venice by William Shakespeare; Jane Seymour, Anne Boleyn, and Catherine Howard (prior to becoming queens) in The Tudors (2007–2010); Sabé and the Royal Handmaidens to Padmé Amidala in Star Wars: Episode I – The Phantom Menace (1999); Greer, Kenna, and Lola in Reign (2013–2017)
Landlord	The penny-pinching owner of an apartment block or boarding house who rents out the rooms, often to students or immigrants. The building is usually in a bad state of repair with water leaks, crumbling masonry, dangerous circuitry, or vermin infestation. Shady landlords of low-rent housing may behave in a predatory way with marginalized tenants, making money off them as a loan shark or engaging in sexual misconduct. Landlords with multiple apartments may become a wealthy property tycoon or speculator.	Alexei Sayle in The Young Ones; Miss Fluffe in Dog City; Jacob Marley in A Christmas Carol; Uncle Pennybags; Ian Beale in Eastenders; Professor Stanley Unwin in Carry On Regardless; Beau Bridges as The Landlord; Mary Ault in The Lodger: A Story of the London Fog; Johnny Depp in Donald Trump's The Art of the Deal: The Movie; Sebastian Stan in The Apprentice
Latin Lady	An elegant, mysterious and passionate Hispanic woman, often a love interest to the hero. See Dark lady for the villainous equivalent.	Ferguson's wife in The Adventure of the Sussex Vampire; Delia Magana as Luisa in Thus Is Life; Dolores Del Rio as The Widow from Monte Carlo; Catherine Zeta-Jones in The Mask of Zorro
Latin lover	In addition to the stock elements from the Rake character of being a handsome and charming seducer, the Latin Lover stock character added a southern European origin or appearance (darker skin and hair) to add an "exotic" or foreign element for American audiences. He conquers women with a sharp, focused glare and outbursts of passion (or romantic dancing) and he is a fighter for justice or freedom.	Tyrone Power as Zorro; Cesar Romero as the titular character in The Gay Caballero; Antonio Banderas in Matador; Mateo in Benidorm sees himself as a seducer, but all the women reject him; Antonio Moreno as The Spanish Dancer; Ramon Novarro in Devil-May-Care; Rudolph Valentino in Blood and Sand
Legacy hero	A character thrust, often unwillingly, into the role of a hero through nepotism, sometimes having been previously unaware of their family's legacy.	Luke Skywalker in the Star Wars film series; Frodo Baggins in the 1954 book The Lord of the Rings by J.R.R. Tolkien; Silk Spectre / Laurie Juspeczyk in the Watchmen comic book series; Jaime Reyes, the third Blue Beetle; Simba in The Lion King; Arthur Christmas
LGBTQ characters	In many forms of popular entertainment, gay men are portrayed stereotypically as promiscuous, flashy, flamboyant, and bold, while lesbians are usually portrayed with crew cuts, work boots, nose piercings and masculine mannerisms. Transsexuals and crossdressers are often portrayed negatively in a creepy, mentally unstable villains or campy, ridiculous characters with a crush on the straight male protagonist. Similar to race-, religion-, and class-based caricatures, these stereotypical stock character representations vilify or make light of marginalized and misunderstood groups. In U.S. television and other media, gay or lesbian characters tend to die or meet an unhappy ending, such as becoming insane, more often than other characters. For feminine lesbian characters, see Lipstick lesbian. For the pejorative gay stereotype (typically used in 1930s), see Sissy.	Madame Hooch in Harry Potter; Jacq in Top Boy; The Leather Boys are hyper-masculine gay bikers; Jamie New in Everybody's Talking About Jamie is a young gay man who has recently come out; The protagonists of the Birdcage are a flamboyant gay couple; Brian Roberts in Cabaret is openly bisexual; In Little Britain gay comedian Matt Lucas portrays Daffydd Thomas, the only gay in the village; Al Murray's Multiple Personality Disorder has a gay Nazi officer called Horst Schwul; Vicious features Ian McKellen and Derek Jacobi as an older gay couple; A transsexual flirts with Crocodile Dundee until he discovers she is a man; A troupe of drag queens are the protagonists of Priscilla, Queen of the Desert; Christian Burton in Cassadaga; Dr Elliott in Dressed to Kill; See also: Gay characters in fiction and Media portrayal of LGBT people
Little Green Men	Small humanoid extraterrestrials with often scaly, green skin and sometimes with antennae on their heads. These characters are often associated with bug-eyed monsters / aliens. In science fiction fandom, they are also known familiarly as "LGM".	The Great Gazoo in the American television animated sitcom series The Flintstones; The Martians in the 1996 comic science fiction film Mars Attacks! by Tim Burton; Aliens / Little Green Men in the Toy Story film series
Loathly lady	A woman disguised as an ugly hag (often cursed), reveals her true beauty when the curse is lifted. The order may also be reversed. Male counterparts also exist such as the Beast from Beauty and the Beast.	The Wife of Bath's Tale in the 14th century The Canterbury Tales by Geoffrey Chaucer; Princess Melusine in the 15th century poem The Wedding of Sir Gawain and Dame Ragnelle; The Frog Prince in the 1812 Fairy Tales of the Brothers Grimm
Lolita	A young and attractive teenage girl who is getting into a sexual relationship with a middle-aged man. The teenage girl may be portrayed as "precociously seductive." It originates from Vladimir Nabokov's 1955 novel Lolita, which portrays the male narrator's sexual obsession with and victimization of Dolores, a 12-year-old girl whom he privately calls "Lolita."	Dolores in the 1955 novel Lolita by Vladimir Nabokov; Ivy and Lily in the Poison Ivy film series
Loan shark/moneylender/tax collector	A greedy, grasping villain with links to organised crime who preys upon the poor and vulnerable by lending them money they can't repay. Often employs a goon squad of heavies or bailiffs to intimidate his victims and seize their property. A similar character is the crooked taxman in a kleptocracy who uses the same mafia tactics of intimidation and always embezzles a cut of the profits for himself.	Ebenezer Scrooge in A Christmas Carol; Quilp in The Old Curiosity Shop; Dennis Weaver in the Bill; Don Lino in Shark Tale; Jabba the Hutt; Zaccheus; Noxius Vapus in Asterix and the Chieftain's Shield; SkekShod in The Dark Crystal; The Sheriff of Nottingham in The Adventures of Robin Hood
Logger	A big, bearded man in a buffalo plaid shirt, caulk boots and knit cap who chops down trees for a living using an axe or buzzsaw. Loves drinking strong liquor, telling tall tales and brawling. Is usually Canadian.	The lumberjack in Monty Python; Rufus Ruffcut in Wacky Races; Red Riding Hood's father; Paul Bunyan in the Disney film of the same name.; Big Joe Mufferaw; Zak in Ferngully
Londoner/Essex boy/pearly king	A mischievous working class character from East London who often works as a barrow boy, small-time con artist, bartender, rag and bone man, cabbie or market trader. An older Londoner may be a pearly king. A Londoner who becomes part of the nouveau riche will often relocate to Basildon, take up clay pigeon shooting and exchange his old Thames van for a new Range Rover. His wife will wear a vulgar leopardskin or fur coat and white stiletto heels. A successful Essex man will run a small business to launder the money made from drug dealing.	Del-Boy in Only Fools and Horses; Billy Hill in Once Upon A Time In London; Tom Hardy as Alfie Solomons in Peaky Blinders; Albert Steptoe in Steptoe and Son; Reg Varney in On The Buses; The cast of Eastenders; John Jorrocks; Gangsta Granny; Mark in The Only Way Is Essex; Billy Reynolds in Essex Boys
Loner	An isolated, alienated person who struggles to connect with people. Their personality may range from benign and withdrawn to embittered and angry, but they tend to seek out solitude. A variant is to depict the person as able to have inconsequential social interaction, but incapable of feeling love or caring – e.g., Meursault in The Outsider.	Meursault in the 1942 novella The Outsider by Albert Camus; Holden Caulfield in the 1951 novel The Catcher in the Rye by J.D. Salinger; The Grinch in the 1957 book How the Grinch Stole Christmas! by Dr Seuss; Boo Radley in the 1960 novel To Kill a Mockingbird by Harper Lee; Stevens, the reserved butler in the 1989 novel The Remains of the Day by Kazuo Ishiguro; Frank Castle in The Punisher comic book series
Lost love	The lover to the protagonist who may have died or gone missing. A common character in gothic fiction whose memory leaves the main character tormented.	Lenore; Hazel Court in The Raven; Victoria in Dr. Phibes; Nora Fries in Batman: The Animated Series; Ellie in Up
Legionary and hoplite	The fearless ancient Greek warrior and disciplined Roman legionnaire were classic sword and sandal movie protagonists. Characterisation varies from historically authentic peplum films to fantasy inspired by classical mythology involving the Greek pantheon, demigods and monsters.	Titus Pullo in Rome; Longinus in The Greatest Story Ever Told; Lucius Flavius Silva in Masada; Marcus Aquila in The Eagle; Biggus Dickus in Monty Python's Life of Brian; Darius in The Colossus of Rhodes; King Leonidas' Spartans in 300; Achilles in the Iliad
Lord or Lady	An upper class character with a British aristocracy title who is dressed in elegant clothes and attended by servants. A duke, marquis or earl often fills the role of prince charming due to his royal blood. The elegant English lady could be a glamorous heiress or a secret agent. Lords usually live on a country estate and spend their time hunting and fishing, with their social calendars filled with fancy balls. Some more intrepid aristocrats may also be adventurers and explorers. A Scottish laird is often a Jacobite rebel. Barons are usually greedy and evil. A count in Eastern Europe may sometimes be a vampire. Lords and Lady characters range from noble, virtuous benefactors to airheaded aristocratic twits to evil Machiavellian types.	Sir Basil in the adventures of Parsley the Lion; Lord Snooty; Lady Chatterley; Lady Tottington in Curse of the Were-Rabbit; Lady Penelope in Thunderbirds Are Go; Maid Marian in The Adventures of Robin Hood; Ex-Jacobite Sir Arthur Wardour in The Antiquary by Walter Scott; Lord Ramage in the books by Dudley Pope; In The Master of Ballantrae by Robert Louis Stevenson Jamie Durie is a Jacobite laird who becomes a pirate; Lord Marmaduke Montague Rickety-Cobweb in Gumdrop Finds A Ghost; Lord John Franklin the explorer in The Terror; The evil Baron Vladimir Harkonnen in Dune; Baron Silas Greenback in Danger Mouse; Count Orlok; The Count in Sesame Street
Lotus eaters	These are characters who spend their time indulging themselves and distracting themselves with sensual pleasures rather than dealing with practical concerns. They forget about their work and goals and give themselves over to luxury. In Greek mythology, lotophages were people on an island who ate the sweet, narcotic lotus fruit, which induced a peaceful, drowsy apathy. They would forget their home and loved ones and long only to stay with their fellow lotus-eaters.	In Homer's epic poem the Odyssey, Odysseus and his crew reached the land of the Lotus-eaters, which was filled with lotus fruit that was so delicious that all his crewmen who ate it stopped caring about going home.; In the poem The Lotos-Eaters by Alfred Tennyson, a group of mariners arrive at a new land and eat the lotos fruit. It puts them into an altered state and isolates them from the outside world.; In William Somerset Maugham’s "The Lotus Eater", a bank manager named Thomas Wilson travels to the idyllic Capri, where he decides to live a life of leisure for decades, immersed in his reading.; In the novel Percy Jackson & the Olympians: The Lightning Thief by Rick Riordan, the characters come to the 'Lotus Hotel and Casino', which is based on the lotus-eaters. The casino muddles the character's senses and distorts time; years can pass without them knowing. In the film adaptation, the characters eat physical Lotus cookies and are only able to escape when they stop eating them. In the show, characters breathe in gas infused with lotus.; In "The Lotus Eaters" is a 1935 short story by Stanley G. Weinbaum that explores the Lotus Eaters as an intelligent vegetative species on the planet Venus discovered by human explorers.; In the 1972-1973 BBC television series The Lotus Eaters, a group of British ex-pats in Crete are staying there to escape difficulties or embarrassments in their previous lives.
Lovable loser	A variant of the everyman and underdog characters, usually a nerd. Bad luck and his neurotic, awkward personality traits continually prevent this sympathetic, well-meaning character from achieving his desires and ambitions.	Harold Lloyd as Harold Diddlebock; Lucien Cramp in The Cramp Twins; Charlie Brown; Chandler Bing in Friends; Sheldon in The Big Bang Theory; Bruce Campbell in My Name Is Bruce
Lovers	Alongside the hero, these are probably the oldest of archetypes, dating back to prehistory, occurring time and again in ancient mythologies from around the world. These main characters who fall in deeply love, often despite the blocking effect of other characters (chaperones or family) or events as star-crossed lovers that are strongly fraternizing with the "enemy". This pair of stock characters appear as the Innamorati in the 16th-century Italian theatre style of commedia dell'arte. In the plays, everything revolved around the lovers in some regard. While commedia dell'arte lovers typically overcome all obstacles and are united happily at the end, later dramatic and literary works may have the young lovers face a tragic end.	Cupid, the god of love, and the mortal Psyche with whom the god fell in love in the tale of 2nd century CE Cupid and Psyche found in the Metamorphoses of Apuleius; Daphnis, the goatherd protagonist, and Chloë, a shepherd's daughter, of the 2nd century CE Greek pastoral romance novel Daphnis and Chloë by Longus; Romeo Montague and Juliet Capulet in the play Romeo & Juliet by William Shakespeare; Tony and Maria in West Side Story, the 1950s musical adaptation of Romeo & Juliet; Jack Dawson and Rose DeWitt Bukater in the 1997 film Titanic

== M ==
Character type	Description	Examples
Machiavel	An amoral politician who is obsessed with power and willing to commit criminal acts to secure or enhance their position. The Machiavel character typically follows the principles set out by Niccolò Machiavelli's The Prince, a guidebook for 16th century rulers. The Machiavel as a villain devises ruthless plots to eliminate rivals and their families and is willing to do anything, including betrayal of allies or murdering noncombatants, to win more power.	Richard of Gloucester in the play Richard III and both Edmund and Cornwall in the play King Lear by William Shakespeare; Both Macbeth and Lady Macbeth in the Shakespeare play Macbeth; The character Machiavel in Christopher Marlowe's play The Jew of Malta; Frank Underwood in the 2010s American television political drama series House of Cards, a fictional President who lies, cheats and betrays others in his rise to the top.
Mad bomber/sapper/demolitions expert	Has a fascination with all types of explosives and their tactical use. In war films he is part of an elite unit tasked with blowing up an enemy stronghold or bridge. In heist films he is assigned the job of blasting open the safe with dynamite. Is often Irish and may be unstable. Their antagonist is the law enforcement bomb disposal expert.	John Mallory in A Fistful of Dynamite; Pedersen in The Heroes of Telemark; Depth Charge in G.I. Joe; Arthur in The Italian Job; Robert Jordan in For Whom the Bell Tolls; Major Pyecroft in Sharpe's Mission; John Miller in The Guns of Navarone; Billy Shoepack the alligator tug in Tugs; Toll Road in The Expendables 2
Mad scientist	An eccentric or insane scientist, who is often amoral and the villain of the piece or else driven to insanity by their experiments. Not all mad scientists are evil, with single-minded obsession with their field of study being mistakenly equated with mania – q.v. boffin. Some intend to be benevolent, but think little of the wider repercussions of their work in society or unintentionally cause an accident due to their hubristic attempt to play God in the laboratory. This character trope may well work alone or just have a single stereotyped hunchbacked assistant, often called Igor.	Victor Frankenstein in the 1818 novel Frankenstein; or, the Modern Prometheus by Mary Wollstonecraft Shelley; Dr Henry Jekyll in the 1886 novella Strange Case of Dr Jekyll and Mr Hyde by Robert Louis Stevenson; Dr Moreau in the 1896 novel The Island of Doctor Moreau by H.G. Wells; Sidney Stratton, the eponymous hero of the 1951 film, The Man in the White Suit; Dr Midland in The Cars That Ate Paris; Professor Calculus; Rick Sanchez in Rick and Morty; Doctor Xeno, the rival of Doctor Stone
Magical girl	A young girl—typically an ordinary middle-school student—who is granted mystical powers and an ornate costume by a magical mascot to fight evil forces. Defined by themes of friendship, love, hope, and transformation sequences, the archetype ranges from lighthearted heroism to darker psychological deconstructions.	Usagi Tsukino (Sailor Moon) in Sailor Moon (1991–1997); Sakura Kinomoto in Cardcaptor Sakura (1996–2000); Madoka Kaname in Puella Magi Madoka Magica (2011); Ichigo Momomiya in Tokyo Mew Mew (2000–2003); Sabrina Spellman; Hermione Granger; Persepolis in Luna Nera; Kiki in Kiki's Delivery Service; Star in Star vs. the Forces of Evil; Strike Witches; Nadya in First Squad; The Powerpuff Girls; Earwig and the Witch; A Certain Magical Index
Magical Negro	An American stereotype of a black person with special insight or mystical powers, who ends up coming to the aid of the white protagonist.	Uncle Remus, narrator of the 1881 American folk tales of Joel Chandler Harris; John Coffey in the 1996 novel The Green Mile by Stephen King; Bagger Vance in the 2000 film The Legend of Bagger Vance
Magical Native American	A US stereotype of a person of First Nations origin, with shamanistic powers, who typically comes to help a family troubled by disturbed supernatural or evil forces.	Taylor in the 1986 film Poltergeist II: The Other Side; Thunderbird (John Proudstar) in the Marvel comic books; Warpath in the X-Men; Mani in Brotherhood of the Wolf
Magician or illusionist	The illusionist is a vaudeville performer skilled at sleight of hand. He may start out doing simple parlor tricks such as card counting or pulling a rabbit from a top hat, then move on to more spectacular stage magic illusions such as escapology or making a large object disappear. Sometimes he is a wizard with real magical powers who uses the party conjurer persona as a cover.	Eisenheim in The Illusionist; Zatara; Tommy Cooper in The Plank; The Wizard in Wicked; Houdini in The Grim Game; Master Yu Fong in Black Magic; Avatar in Wizards defeats his more powerful rival Blackwolf with a parlor trick; A conjurer pretends to smash Norman Wisdom's watch with a hammer in Up in the World
Maharajah/ sultan	An Indian or Middle Eastern ruler similar to the sheikh or good king. Often wears a turban and flowing robe. They are wealthy and have many gemstones in their luxurious palace. A young maharajah will be a variant of Prince Charming. May have a treacherous flunky such as a vizier or eunuch plotting to overthrow him.	Haroun El-Plassid in Iznogoud; The Maharajah of Gaipajama in Cigars of the Pharaoh; Rajah Wotsit in Asterix and the Magic Carpet; Zalim Singh in Indiana Jones and the Temple of Doom; The Caliph in Sabu and the Magic Ring; Parisa's father in The 7th Voyage of Sinbad; Ahmad in The Thief of Bagdad
Mailman	A familiar figure who travels by bicycle or van and carries a bag of letters. He may be a cheery character who knows everyone in the neighborhood, and keeps an eye on the community or a grumpy and overworked misanthrope. More rarely, they may be violent, angry characters prone to going postal.	Postman Pat; Willie Lumpkin in Marvel Comics; Kevin Costner as a post-apocalyptic letter carrier who helps to rebuild civilization in The Postman; Fred Astaire in Santa Claus is Comin' to Town; Agent K in Men in Black 2; Hazelrigg, the sociopathic and murderous postman in Dark Night of the Scarecrow
Malcontent/Misanthrope	See Curmudgeon	
Male buffoon (Hispanic)	This stereotype is used for comic relief. The characters' struggle to learn English or control their hot-blooded temper is used as a source of humor.	Pancho in The Return of the Cisco Kid; Sgt Garcia in Walt Disney's Zorro; Ricky Ricardo in I Love Lucy; Manuel in Fawlty Towers; Panchito Pistoles in The Three Caballeros; Speedy Gonzales in Daffy Duck's Fantastic Island
Mama bear/Papa wolf	An overprotective parent who will inflict brutal vigilante justice on anyone who harms their kid. Is often a retired hitman or combat veteran. Sometimes their baby is a dog or cat.	Charles Bronson in Death Wish 2; Woody Harrleson in Zombieland; John Wick; The Punisher; Obelix to Dogmatix; The Angry Birds; Nicolas Cage as Big Daddy in Kick-Ass; Tom Hanks in Road to Perdition; Ogami Itto in Shogun Assassin; Liam Neeson in Taken; Sigourney Weaver in Aliens; Geena Davis in The Long Kiss Goodnight; Uma Thurman in Kill Bill
Mammy archetype	An American stereotype of a rotund, homely, and matronly black woman who has a sunny demeanor and she is devoted to her role as a cook and caregiver. This archetype originated during the era of slavery, and it is considered to be a pejorative racial stereotype.	Aunt Jemima brand of the American pancake mix; Mammy Two Shoes in the Tom and Jerry series of animated short films; Calpurnia in the 1960 book To Kill a Mockingbird by Harper Lee
Man alone	A solitary, rootless nonconformist" or antihero whose extreme moral beliefs have led them to be friendless. Associated with Literature of New Zealand.	Johnson in the New Zealand novel Man alone; Rorschach (Walter Kovacs), the strictly moral comic book character in Watchmen; Sasuke Uchiha from the manga, Naruto by Masashi Kishimoto; Howell Jenkins in Howl's Moving Castle
Manic Pixie Dream Girl/ loosu ponnu	Usually static young female characters who have eccentric personality quirks and are unabashedly girlish, dreamy, and attractive. They often exist only to serve as a source of inspiration to the male character, and as such, little of their inner life is depicted. The Indian equivalent is the loosu ponnu.	Zelda Spellman; Bo Peep; Debora from Baby Driver; Swapna in Vallavan; Anjali in Agni Natchathiram; Jaanu in Orange
Marksman/ sniper/ archer	The marksman is deadly accurate at long range with a ranged weapon and cool under pressure. In stories set in antiquity or the medieval era they will be a skilled archer with a bow and arrow. In the 18th and early 19th century, they will have a long musket. In the modern era, they will have a scoped sniper rifle. In Western films he may use a Winchester rifle or Sharps rifle for trick shots.	Major Eazy; Dum Dum Dugan of the Howling Commandos; Bobby Thompson in Targets; Daniel Hagman in Sharpe; Legolas in Lord of the Rings; Schoolboy in Rambo 4; The protagonist of the Day of the Jackal; Hawkeye in Iron Man; Jack Reacher; Starinsky in Deathwatch; Quigley Down Under; William Tell
Martinet	A narcissistic military officer who is abusive to the enlisted men. Will order excessive floggings and pointlessly send troops to their deaths so he can earn another medal. Often ends up getting fragged with a grenade. See also Bully and Incompetent military officer.	Lieutenant De Martinet in the Lego Pirates comic strip; Henry Simmerson in Sharpe; Sgt Hartman in Full Metal Jacket; Niedermeyer in Animal House; Captain Bligh in Mutiny on the Bounty; Herbert Sobel in Band of Brothers; Hauptmann Stransky in Cross of Iron; Captain Smith in An Unusual Vengeance by William Chambers Morrow
Mary Sue	A (usually female; male characters of the type may be nicknamed a Marty Stu or Gary Stu) character who is exceptionally talented beyond her (or his) training and has very few, if any, character flaws or weaknesses, to the point of absurdity. The term has strong negative connotations and is generally used as an insult; it was originally coined in the 1970s to describe the work of young, amateur fan fiction writers.	Rey (Star Wars sequel trilogy); Jennifer Marlowe (WKRP in Cincinnati); Wesley Crusher (Star Trek: The Next Generation); Bella Swan in Twilight; Megan Fox in Transformers; Miley Cyrus as Hannah Montana; Carol Danvers in Captain Marvel; Mutt Williams in Indiana Jones and the Crystal Skull
Masked villain	A masked villain is a stock character in genre fiction that was developed and popularized in movie serials, beginning with The Hooded Terror in The House of Hate, (1918) the first fully-costumed mystery villain of the movies, and frequently used in the adventure stories of pulp magazines and sound-era movie serials in the early twentieth century, as well as postmodern horror films.	"The Clutching Hand" in The Exploits of Elaine; "The Hooded Terror" in The House of Hate; Fur-coated Mystery Man in The Phantom Foe; "Monsieur X" in The Trail of the Octopus; "The Gargoyle" in The Spider Returns.; "The Crimson Ghost" in The Crimson Ghost; "The Wasp" in Mandrake the Magician; "Captain Mephisto" in Manhunt of Mystery Island.; "The Rattler" in Mystery Mountain; "The Wizard" in Batman and Robin.; "The Master Key" in The Master Key.; The Colonel from The Man in the Brown Suit.; A from Pretty Little Liars; Anokata from Detective Conan.; The Octopus from The Spirit.; Tobi from Naruto.; Gideon G. Graves from Scott Pilgrim.; "All For One" from Boku no Hero Academia; The Masked Osodashi from Jankenman.
Masochist and sadist	Masochists enjoy feeling pain and being humiliated. Sadists enjoy inflicting pain on their victims and are usually serial killers, domestic abusers or sociopathic CEOs. A female sadist will often work as a dominatrix.	Stamper in Tomorrow Never Dies is a sadomasochist who enjoys torturing his victims but also gets aroused when he feels pain; Max Zorin is another evil sadist who is both a corporate executive and a terrorist; Toht in Raiders of the Lost Ark is a sadistic Gestapo agent and torturer; Wanda the dominatrix in Venus in Furs; Abiru Kobishi in Sayonara, Zetsubou-Sensei is a cruel animal abuser who is heavily bandaged as the result of provoking animals into attacking her; Brigitte Bardot as Ms. Don Juan is a nymphomaniac who enjoys emotionally abusing her lovers; Zed and Maynard's masochistic gimp in Pulp Fiction
Master of disguise/ enemy agent	A character, often (but not always) a villain, who is capable of disguising himself or herself as multiple other unrecognizable characters. The master of disguise's tactics may range from simple impersonation and costume work to shapeshifters with supernatural powers. Is often a professional thief, hitman or enemy spy.	Morph (X-Men); Quick Change Quentin (Snooper and Blabber); Boris Badenov in Rocky and Bullwinkle; Carlos the Hamster / White Rabbit (Robbie the Reindeer); Pistachio Disguisey (The Master of Disguise); Ernst Stavro Blofeld in James Bond; Caesar's spy Mintjulep in Asterix and Cleopatra; Rollin Hand (Mission: Impossible)
Matchmaker	A matchmaker or "marriage broker" is a character who helps single people find a compatible pairing for marriage. In some cultures, the role of the matchmaker is professionalized, so the matchmaker may be compensated with a fee. In other cases, the matchmaker may be a family member, family friend, or member of the clergy. The matchmaker in a story may be altruistic and benevolent, and have noble goals, such helping to find a good love pairing or ensure long-term financial security for someone. On the other hand, some matchmaker characters may have more cunning political or strategic goals, such as securing business influence or affecting the balance of power between aristocratic families. Some matchmakers may be portrayed negatively, as manipulators or meddlers. In some romantic comedies, the matchmaker's planned love pairing for a couple may not work, but the matchmaker may themselves fall in love. A subtype in stories set in Jewish communities is the marriage broker or shadchan.	Mrs Bennet, an inept and meddling amateur matchmaker for her daughters in Pride and Prejudice by Jane Austen; Emma Woodhouse, the titular character of the Emma by Jane Austen; In Fiddler on the Roof (1971), Yente (Molly Picon) is an experienced village matchmaker who tries to find husbands for the five daughters of Tevye. The song "Matchmaker, Matchmaker" explores the negotiations and compromises in the matchmaking process.; Raina plays matchmaker and to set up potential partners from the Indian community in The Matchmaker's List by Sonya Lalli; Jewish matchmaker characters appear in: Sara Glikman helping match couples in the book The Matchmaker's Gift by Lynda Cohen Loigman; Meant to be mine by Hannah Orenstein; Mr Perfect on Paper by Jean Meltzer
Dowager matriarch	A formidable, sharp-tongued, and aristocratic elderly woman who presides over a wealthy family dynasty with ironclad tradition and biting wit. Outwardly intimidating and obsessed with social propriety, she frequently acts as the strategic protector of her family's legacy while delivering deadpan observations on younger generations.	Lady Bracknell in The Importance of Being Earnest (1895) by Oscar Wilde; Violet Crawley, Dowager Countess of Grantham in Downton Abbey (2010–2015); Olenna Tyrell in A Song of Ice and Fire and Game of Thrones; Lady Catherine de Bourgh in Pride and Prejudice (1813) by Jane Austen
Medium	A psychic person who helps the protagonist, or a charlatan who takes advantage of a character's gullbility. Mediums may be depicted using spirit channelling, including séance tables, trance, and ouija.	Madame Arcati in the 1941 comic play Blithe Spirit by Noël Coward; Tangina Barrons in the 1982 film Poltergeist; Whoopi Goldberg's fake medium, Oda Mae Brown, in the 1990 film Ghost; Agatha Lively in Steven Spielberg's 2002 film Minority Report adapted from the 1956 short story by Philip K. Dick; Cassandra Anderson in the 2012 dystopian film Dredd
Mean girl	Also known as the "school diva" or "queen bee" who is an attractive and popular high school girl who uses her status to bully others, primarily the protagonist. She is often the girlfriend of the school's popular jock.	Lucy van Pelt in the comic strip Peanuts by Charles Shultz; Regina George played by Rachel McAdams in the 2004 film Mean Girls; Chloé Bourgeois in the French television animated series Miraculous: Tales of Ladybug and Cat Noir; Nina Harper in the Canadian-Chinese television animated series Braceface; Panty Anarchy in Panty and Stocking with Garterbelt
Merpeople	A human-like race that lives underwater, often the remnant of a lost ancient civilisation such as Atlantis. Mermaids are the beautiful daughters of King Neptune resembling human women with fish tails. Sirens are evil shapeshifters who lure in sailors with their singing. Other species of merpeople are monstrous creatures with human and fish-like features.	Princess Ariel in Disney's Little Mermaid; The Snorks; Jason Momoa as Aquaman; Daryl Hannah in Splash!; Marina in Stingray; Mindy in The SpongeBob SquarePants Movie; Akata, The Prince of Atlantis; The Warlords of Atlantis; The sirens in The Odyssey; Admiral Ackbar in Return of the Jedi; The Sea Devils in Doctor Who; The Deep Ones in Lovecraft's Shadow Over Innsmouth; The fish-people in One Piece; The Fomorians in Slaine the King; The Creature from the Black Lagoon
Messenger/Herald/Town crier	A trusted servant of the king who reads out proclamations to the bystanders. His presence may be announced with trumpets, drums or a hand bell. In a medieval setting he will wear a tabard bearing the Royal Arms.	Candy Candido as the crocodile herald in Disney's Robin Hood; The Mouth of Sauron in Return of the King; Silver Surfer in Fantastic Four; The reindeer town crier in Rudolph the Red-Nosed Reindeer; Mr. Bumble in Oliver Twist; A drummer boy from the Prussian army reads out the quarantine proclamation in Nosferatu
Middle child	In a family setting, usually the second of three children, who is often neglected or disrespected due to their parents (and the overall story) paying more attention to the youngest and oldest siblings.	Jan Brady; Stephanie Tanner; Malcolm as the titular lead inverts this trope in the American sitcom series Malcolm in the Middle; Chris Griffin
Midget/ Person with dwarfism	In comedy, people with dwarfism are often the butt of jokes involving midget tossing. In more serious dramas, the little person is clever and dignified and serves as a trusted adviser to the hero.	Martin Klebba in Pirates of the Caribbean: Dead Man's Chest; Mini Me in Austin Powers; Billy Curtis in The Terror of Tiny Town; The Munchkins in The Wizard of Oz; Curtis the Dwarf in Freakshow; Peter Dinklage as Tyrion Lannister in Game of Thrones; The Master in Mad Max 3; Albert the Fifth Musketeer
Milkman	A delivery person roped into a sexual affair with a married customer. Common in pornographic films, the delivery person need not be delivering milk, though this specific type was a common joke when milk delivery was a common profession. Other varieties of this included window cleaners.	Ernie (The Fastest Milkman in the West), a hit song for Benny Hill; Pat Mustard from Father Ted; The Seduced Milkmen from Monty Python; Tevye from Fiddler on the Roof; Norman Wisdom in The Early Bird; Stephen King's Morning Deliveries (Milkman No. 1) is about a serial killer milkman
Miltonic hero	A romanticized type of antihero who is both charismatic and wicked. The Miltonic hero resists the instructions of authority figures and feels that moral rules do not apply to them. The name refers to poet John Milton.	John Milton's characterisation of Satan in the 17th-century blank-verse poem Paradise Lost; Melmoth in the 1820 Gothic novel Melmoth the Wanderer by Charles Maturin; Heathcliff in the 1847 novel Wuthering Heights
Military officer	A leader and role model to the enlisted troops who combines bravery in the face of danger with a brilliant mind for strategy. Variants include the Roman centurion, cavalry officer of the Napoleonic Wars, tank commander and four star general. A retired major or colonel will often take a leading role in the village council.	Brad Pitt in Fury; Colonel Kilgore in Apocalypse Now; Lucius Vorenus in Rome; Major Forbes in Glory; Colonel in 101 Dalmatians was an army mascot during World War II; Lee Marvin in the Dirty Dozen; John Connor in Terminator: Salvation; The Major General in The Pirates of Penzance; Iroh in the Last Airbender; War Machine in Iron Man 2; Jean-Claude Van Damme in Street Fighter
Miner/dwarf	A gruff, bearded character who spends all day underground digging for gold, diamonds or coal. Is often a Scotsman, Welshman or Northerner in a flat cap and donkey jacket. In fantasy, he is usually a dwarf with a love for ale, spirits, meats and feasts.	Jess Tyler in Butterfly; Jackie, Billy Elliot's father; Bill Nighy in Pride; Grumpabit in The Littl' Bits; Thorin Oakenshield's followers in The Hobbit; The gnomes in the Forest of Boland Light Railway; Snow White and the Seven Dwarves; The Treacle People; The villagers in The Navigator: A Medieval Odyssey
Minstrel/Uncle Tom	An offensive blackface stereotype from the 19th century, usually portrayed by a white actor in greasepaint and an afro wig. Black American minstrels played a stringed instrument such as a fiddle or banjo and wore cast-off dandy clothing	The Golliwog in Noddy by Enid Blyton; Jim Crow; Al Jolson in Mammy; Bamboozled satirises the minstrel shows by having black actors in blackface.; Many black characters in The Birth of a Nation; Gene Wilder in Silver Streak; Bing Crosby in Holiday Inn; Coal Black and De Sebben Dwarfs
Miser/Scrooge	This ancient archetype is a penny-pinching but wealthy boss with a preternaturally aged and dour demeanour, who refuses to spend money and prefers to hoard it. Is often a Scotsman. Primarily, the character is now based on the protagonists of Molière's Harpagon in The Miser and on Ebenezer Scrooge from A Christmas Carol. The latter's name has entered the lexicon as a shorthand term for this character. Misers range from excessively thrifty, but otherwise benign types, through to avaricious, cold-hearted types who are willing to harm others to gain wealth.	Harpagon in the 1668 play The Miser by Molière; Ebenezer Scrooge in the 1843 novel A Christmas Carol by Charles Dickens; Mr Potter in the 1946 film It's a Wonderful Life by Frank Capra; Randolph and Mortimer Duke, played by Don Ameche and Ralph Bellamy, in the 1983 comedy film Trading Places; Frank Cross, a US television chief executive played by Bill Murray, in the 1988 satirical-comedy Christmas film Scrooged; Jean Paul Getty as portrayed in the 2017 biographical crime drama All the Money in the World; Private Frazer in Dad's Army; Scrooge McDuck
Mole/ double agent	In spy films, one of the villain's trusted operatives is revealed to be an infiltrator on the side of the heroes. See also Judas when a member of the heroes' team is secretly working for the villains.	Adolf Verloc in The Secret Agent; Bloody Bill the pirate cook in The Coral Island; Agent Number 3 in Goldmember; Double Trouble in She-Ra and the Princesses of Power; General Hux in Star Wars; Severus Snape in Harry Potter and the Deathly Hallows; The Mole in Happy Tree Friends; Jason Bourne
Monk/nun	A person who isolates from society in a monastery or convent and takes a vow of celibacy. In the Catholic church monks have shaved heads and wear grey or brown monastic habits while nuns cover their hair and dress entirely in black. Monks in a medieval setting may be knights templar fighting in the crusades or protectors of a sacred artefact such as the holy grail, spear of destiny or true cross. A Buddhist monk is usually a kung fu master.	Jet Li in Shaolin Temple; Andy Lau in Shaolin; Chow Yun-Fat as the Bulletproof Monk; Aang in The Last Airbender; Maximus and the Brotherhood of Steel in Fallout; The Jedi of the Old Republic era, such as Ben Kenobi; Herik in Xcalibur; Aidan in The Secret of Kells; Gerard de Ridefort in Kingdom of Heaven; The old Templar knight in Indiana Jones and the Last Crusade; The undead Templars in Tombs of the Blind Dead; The Sisters of Battle in Hammer and Bolter; Julie Andrews in The Sound of Music; Whoopi Goldberg in Sister Act; Sister Brigid in Evelyn
Monster hunter	A person who slays dangerous monsters such as demons, vampires or dragons. May be a white knight, ronin or part of an organisation such as the Catholic Church.	Peter Cushing as Abraham Van Helsing; Nadeem the Firemaster in Ghostbusters 4; Buffy the Vampire Slayer; Hyakkimaru; Saint George; Gotrek and Felix; K-Pop Demon Hunters; Henry Cavill as The Witcher
Mother-in-law	A stereotypical portrayal of a character's spouse's mother; frequently a battle-axe and always disapproving of her daughter/son-in-law. There is typically ongoing antagonism between the mother and the character's spouse.	Pearl Slaghoople in the American television animated sitcom The Flintstones; Marie Barone, played by Doris Roberts, in the American television sitcom Everybody Loves Raymond, who is meddlesome and incessantly makes conceited remarks to her daughter-in-law Debra; Viola Fields, played by Jane Fonda, in the film Monster-in-Law; Adele Delfino, played by Celia Weston, in the American television series Desperate Housewives; Endora, played by Agnes Morehead in the American television series Bewitched
Mother's boy	An awkward man who is excessively attached to his mother and who continues to act in a childish, submissive fashion even into adulthood. The character is depicted as having an unhealthy dependence on his mother at an age at which he is expected to be self-reliant (e.g. live on his own, earn his own money, be married). The character may be depicted as effeminate.	Private Pike, played by Ian Lavender, in the 1970s BBC television sitcom series Dad's Army; Howard Wolowitz in the American television sitcom series The Big Bang Theory; Eddie Kaspbrak (Stephen King's It); Norman Bates; Kes from Mother's Boys; Roger Moore in Cannonball Run; Snow Miser and Heat Miser in The Year Without A Santa Claus
Mother Nature/Earth goddess	A caring, benevolent spirit or goddess representing nature. Is always female. Often has a flower crown and a cornucopia containing the fruits of the harvest.	Yavanna in The Silmarillion; Demeter in Greek mythology; Mother Nature in The Year Without a Santa Claus; Mother Nature also appears as an ally of the Smurfs; Bette Midler in The Earth Day Special; Queen Tara in Epic
Mountain climber/Mountain guide	An experienced, brave, and indefatigable guide who knows the mountain like the back of his hand and can be relied upon to lead the explorers to the summit or rescue lost climbers. Is usually Indian or Swiss. Carries an ice axe and has crampons on his boots.	Kusang in The Abominable Snowman; Phurba Tashi in Sherpa; Tharkey in Tintin in Tibet; Genden Phungsok as the titular character in Tenzing; Heidi; Gaku: Minna no Yama; Fukamachi in The Summit of the Gods; Chung in the Wolf of Kabul
Muse	This person provides creative inspiration to an artistic creator such as a writer, artist, or composer. While muses are often women, there are male examples. The term is derived from the Muses, ancient Greek goddesses of inspiration. Muses are often close friends and sometimes lovers or spouses, who inspire or affect the works of an artist due to their beauty (or striking appearance), charisma, emotional depth, intelligence, or eroticism. Sometimes muses are models for specific paintings and sculptures and in literature, a writer may use a muse as the inspiration for a character. One criticism of this stock character is that they often lack agency and they have little role beyond serving as catalyst who sparks the great artist's creativity. The Manic Pixie Dream Girl may have a muse-like role. Some muses have a darker, seductive aspect which crosses over with the femme fatale stock character. Some stories may have a Greek goddess-type muse who can grant divine inspiration to mortals.	Female examples: In the film Mr. Holland's Opus, the music teacher Mr. Holland is inspired by a student Rowena, who motivates him to begin composing again.; In the film Shakespeare in Love the playwright's titular romance with his muse gives him inspiration to improve the play he is writing.; In the 1980 film Xanadu, a struggling artist finds his inspiration when he falls in love with a Greek goddess.; In The World According to Garp, Garp's eventual wife Helen inspires him to become a novelist.; In the TV series Californication, the alcoholic writer Hank Moody is artistically inspired by Karen, his girlfriend.; In The Phantom of the Opera, the Phantom is inspired by Christine.; Male examples: In Crashing, a 2016 UK TV comedy series, Colin is a muse to the artist Melody. This series subverts the muse trope, as Colin is plain-looking and Melody is beautiful.; In The Picture of Dorian Gray, the titular character Dorian serves as the muse for the painter Basil Hallward.; In Michael, a 1924 silent film directed by Carl Theodor Dreyer, the title character serves as the muse for Claude Zoret, a brilliant male painter known as "The Master". Zoret maintains his inspiration as long as he is close with Michael. However, when he starts to paint Countess Lucia Zamikow, he falls in love with her, leading to the loss of his muse connection with Michael, and to the decline in his artistic career.
Musician/ Singer/ Composer	The musician or singer may be a classical music virtuoso or composer, a pop star, a black American gangsta rapper, or frontman or lead singer of an up-and-coming rock band. The composer or songwriter is often a tortured artist who is inspired by an attractive muse, who may be a spoiled diva.	Jem and the Holograms; Josie and the Pussycats; Lady Gaga in A Star Is Born; Blondie as Angel in Rock and Rule; Rami Malek as Freddie Mercury in Bohemian Rhapsody; Timothee Chalamet as Bob Dylan in A Complete Unknown; Eddie and the Cruisers; Franz Schubert in Symphony of Love; Rossini! Rossini!; Viviane Romance as Carmen; Chaim Topol in Fiddler on the Roof; Ice Cube in Straight Outta Compton; Biggie Smalls in Notorious; Frankie Valli's Four Seasons in Jersey Boys
Mutant	In comic books and science fiction, a mutant is a being with new phenotypes that go far beyond what is typically seen in actual biological mutants and often result in the mutated life form exhibiting enhanced or even superhuman abilities. In the Marvel Comics Universe, they are a persecuted minority who many people fear and hate.	In the Marvel Comics Universe's X-Men series, they include a range of terrestrial and alien races, as well as robots, including Ariel, Danger, and Warlock; In Foundation and Empire (1952) by Isaac Asimov, a "mutant" named The Mule possesses the ability to sense and manipulate the emotions of others; In the Teenage Mutant Ninja Turtles franchise, the mutants are creatures who have been transformed by mutagen.; Kevin Costner in Waterworld; The Daleks in Doctor Who; The Toxic Avenger; The intelligent chimps, gorillas and orangutans in Planet of the Apes; The monstrous, carnivorous land whales hunted by the crew of The Ice Schooner
Mythological king/good king or queen	A ruler in myth or legend, usually a wise and heroic one. A historically grounded variant is the good king whose character flaws humanise him and whose courage, generosity and wisdom are virtues for successive rulers to emulate. The Chinese emperor and Roman Caesar is a respected elder who is both a conqueror and philosopher.	Heracles, as portrayed by Lou Ferrigno in the movie of the same name; Theseus; King Arthur, especially in Excalibur; Cate Blanchett as Queen Elizabeth; Helen Mirren as Catherine the Great; King Caspian of Narnia; Alfred the Great in The Last Kingdom; Richard Gere as King David; Yul Brynner in Solomon and Sheba; Good King Wenceslas in St Wenceslas; Marcus Aurelius in Gladiator; Jet Li as the Emperor in Mulan

== N ==
Character type	Description	Examples
Napoleonic villain	Named after the common (but false) myth regarding ruler and military commander Napoleon Bonaparte's supposed short height. This is usually comical villain whose short stature drives them to seek world domination.	Boris Badenov in the 1960s American television animated sitcom series The Adventures of Rocky and Bullwinkle and Friends; Plankton in the 2000s American television animated sitcom series SpongeBob SquarePants; The Brain in the American television animated sitcom series Pinky and the Brain; Lord Farquaad in the 2001 film Shrek; Scrappy-Doo in Scooby-Doo; Tony Robinson as the Sheriff of Nottingham in Maid Marian and her Merry Men; Max Mean in Tiny Toon Adventures; Estroy in Evil Con Carne; Danny DeVito as Penguin in Batman Returns
Former/hiding Nazi	A character who is a former Nazi military man, politician, or scientist and is often very clearly German, though attempting to conceal their past, (poorly and may be played comically). Former Nazi characters in places such as the United States and the Soviet Union are often rocket scientists or other educated professionals, whereas characters hiding out in South America will usually be officers or political leaders from the Third Reich who are trying to evade justice for their actions during the Holocaust.	Dr Strangelove, played by Peter Sellers in one of his many roles, in the 1964 eponymous film by Stanley Kubrick; Franz Liebkind in the 1967 film The Producers and the 2005 musical remake; Dr Josef Mengele in 1970s book and film The Boys from Brazil; Field Marshal Wilfried von Kluck played by Carl Reiner in his 1982 film Dead Men Don't Wear Plaid; Kurt Dussander, played by Ian McKellen, in 1998 film Apt Pupil
Nazi zombies	Typically these nameless and characterless dead Nazi soldiers reanimated as undead monsters, who become mindless killing-machine figures and the cannon-fodder for the heroes of horror-themed films and players of video games. Their bodies and uniforms are typically rotting, giving a horrific appearance.	Call of Duty: World at War; Dead Snow, a film about reanimated Nazi soldiers; King of the Zombies; Waffen-SS zombies occupy the bunker in Outpost; Undead German soldiers terrorise nude female sunbathers in Zombie Lake; In Frankenstein's Army the titular mad scientist creates an army of undead monsters
Necromancer/ sorcerer/ black magician	The evil rival to the wizard who misuses his magical powers for selfish ends such as knowledge, world domination or immortality. May resurrect the dead or use forbidden spells to kill or enslave the population. If he is powerful and charismatic enough, he may become a dark lord.	Gellert Grindelwald in Fantastic Beasts; Thoth-Amon in Conan the Destroyer; The Witch-King of Angmar in Lord of the Rings; Jupiter in The Deptford Mice; Circe in The Odyssey; Slough Feg in Slaine the King; Rasputin in Hellboy; Boris Karloff in The Sorcerers; Harley Warren in The Statement of Randolph Carter; Blackwolf in Wizards
Neptune/Poseidon	In Greek mythology, the king of the sea. A friend to all sailors, but terrifying and merciless when enraged. Has a long white beard, a trident, a crown, and a fish tail.	Neptune moves the rocks blocking the Argo's path in Jason and the Argonauts; The titular character in the Felix the Cat episode Neptune Nonsense; In Pirates of the Caribbean 4 Hector Barbossa steals Poseidon's sword from Blackbeard; Neptune and his daughter Mindy appear in The SpongeBob SquarePants Movie; Ariel's father King Triton in Disney's Little Mermaid; Percy Jackson is the son of Poseidon; The Valar Ulmo in The Silmarillion
Nerd	A socially-awkward, obsessive, or overly-intellectual person. They are often interested in doing well in school (academically and in terms of behavior). They tend to dress in unfashionable clothes and behave in a clumsy way. The "geek" character is similar but may be depicted in more negative manner.	Steve Urkel in the 1990s US television sitcom series Family Matters; Napoleon Dynamite, the eponymous protagonist of the 2004 coming-of-age film; Will McKenzie in the 2000s UK television sitcom series The Inbetweeners; Max Caulfield in the video game Life is Strange; The protagonists of Revenge of the Nerds; Richie Tozer in Stephen King's It; Phoebe Spengler in Ghostbusters: Frozen Empire; The cast of Stranger Things
Neurodivergent person	A variant of the disabled underdog character. Autistic people lack social skills but are very intelligent and good at processing numbers and facts. ADHD people may be loud and unpredictable but often come up with unconventional solutions to problems. People with Tourettes often make weird noises and shout obscenities at inappropriate times.	Klunk in Dastardly and Muttley in their Flying Machines; Duddits in Dreamcatcher; Maddie Ziegler as Music; Lists in Death Race; Dustin Hoffman as Rain Man; Lon Chaney Jr. as Lenny in Of Mice and Men; Nick in White Frog
Nice guy	A young man of wholesome morals, agreeable personality and usually modest means. This character is closely aligned with the boy next-door role. In romantic fiction, he usually struggles with finding women willing to date him — since, as the phrase goes, "nice guys finish last" — in ideal happy endings, he finds a more appropriate woman (possibly a Manic Pixie Dream Girl) for him than those who rejected him.	Marty Piletti in the 1955 romance film Marty; Granville, played by David Jason, in the BBC television sitcom series Open All Hours; Tim Canterbury in the British television sitcom series The Office; Neville Longbottom in the Harry Potter book series by J.K. Rowling; Mickey Blue Eyes; Anson in The Englishman Who Went up a Hill but Came down a Mountain; Gnomeo in Gnomeo and Juliet; Princeton in Avenue Q
Nightclub act	Singers/crooners and other artistes who specialize in vaudeville performances in nightclubs. Nightclub acts are usually portrayed as bottom-of-the-barrel, "has-been" entertainers with limited talent.	Gilda, played by Rita Hayworth, in the eponymous 1946 film; Kitty Collins, played by Ava Gardner, in the 1946 film The Killers; Duke Mitchell and Sammy Petrillo, the Martin and Lewis impersonators in the 1952 film Bela Lugosi Meets a Brooklyn Gorilla; Velma Kelly in the 1975 musical Chicago; Lounge singers Rogers and Clarke in the 1987 film Ishtar; Cliff Richard's clone son in Thunderbirds Are Go; Mylar the nightclub owner in Rock & Rule
Ninja	A ninja (also known as "shinobi") is depicted as mysterious, black-masked Japanese fighter with advanced martial arts and ninjutsu skills in infiltration, assassination and deception. Ninjas may be depicted as having supernatural abilities such as invisibility, walking on water, and control over natural elements. There are many myths and legends about ninjas in popular culture.	Sarutobi Sasuke; Kōga Ninpōchō; Enter the Ninja; Revenge of the Ninja; Ninja Assassin; Akakage; The Master; Ninja Warrior; Shinobi; Ninja Gaiden; Teenage Mutant Ninja Turtles
Noble adversary	A villain who poses a legitimate threat but operates with honor and reason. The battle between the protagonist and the noble adversary is driven by different interpretations of justice rather than a clear demarcation of good and evil, and there may be enough common ground between the two for them to collaborate against threats greater than both.	Magneto in the X-Men; Killmonger in the Jungle Action series by Marvel Comics; Chuck McGill in the 2010s US television drama series Better Call Saul; Te Wheke in Utu; Count Dooku in Attack of the Clones; Kraven the Hunter; Khan Noonien Singh in The Wrath of Khan; Some incarnations of The Master in Doctor Who; In war films the Hun fighter pilot takes on the role of the black knight with his own code of chivalry. Examples include John Philip Law as Red Baron, Pretty Boy in Red Tails, Otto Heideman in The Blue Max, and the Black Falcon in Flyboys
Noble savage	An idealized Indigenous person or otherwise "wild" outsider who is uncorrupted by civilization. The character is depicted in a romanticized way as living in a peaceful golden age of primeval happiness. Is often a Cossack, Highlander, African chieftain, or Indian brave.	Chingachgook in the early 19th century Leatherstocking Tales series of novels by James Fenimore Cooper; Mowgli in the majority of the tales in the 1894—1895 set of short stories, The Jungle Books by Rudyard Kipling; Tarzan in the eponymous book series from 1914 by Edgar Rice Burroughs; Yul Brynner as the cossack Taras Bulba; Liam Neeson as the Scottish Highlander Rob Roy McGregor; Connor MacLeod in Highlander; Prince Ignosi of the Zulu tribe in King Solomon's Mines; Victor Jory as Indian chief Iron Belly in The Mountain Men; Jeff Chandler as Cochise in Broken Arrow; Old Shatterhand's companion Winnetou; Deerfoot of the Shawnee
Northerners	The North-South divide in England is a popular subject for comedy. The people of the Yorkshire Moors are sheep farmers who wear gumboots and waxed jackets, inhabitants of the mill towns especially in Lancashire wear English clogs and eat gravy on their fish and chips, Mancunians are mods who wear sheepskin coats and love northern soul, Geordies keep racing pigeons, don't feel the cold and wear T shirts even when it's snowing, Blackpool residents are carnies or landlords of seedy boarding houses, and scousers are either shoplifters in tracksuits or dodgy plumbers who urinate in the kitchen sink.	Clegg in Last of the Summer Wine; Joe in Soulboy; Matt in Northern Soul; Sacha Baron Cohen in Grimsby; Fred Elliott in Coronation Street; Michael Caine in Get Carter; Wallace and Gromit; Fred Dibnah; Leo Finch in Funland; The Scousers; Gaz the gay best friend in Al Murray's Multiple Personality Disorder; David Morrisey in Blackpool; Spuggy in Geordie Racer
Numskulls / Emotions	Personifications of the human emotions, organisms that live inside the human body, or the parts of the brain that control the organs or bodily functions. Usually take the form of tiny human-like technicians operating a control centre inside the brain. A white blood cell will take on the role of a cop or white knight hunting down monstrous viruses.	The Numskulls from The Beezer; Reason and Emotion; Joy, Sadness, Anger, Fear and Disgust in Inside Out; Ozzy and Drix in Osmosis Jones; Eddie Murphy in Meet Dave; Angel, Animal, Wimp, Genius, Jealousy and God in Herman's Head; The Body Troopers; Maestro in Once Upon A time... Life; Neutrophil in Cells at Work!
Nun	A female religious ascetic, usually Roman Catholic, depicted in varying conventional roles depending on the genre. In drama and comedy, she is often a devout, compassionate caregiver, a strict yet well-meaning schoolteacher, or a fish-out-of-water figure confronting the secular world. In gothic fiction, historical romance, and horror, the archetype frequently shifts to either a naive young novice trapped by vows, a rebellious or worldly sister, or a sadistic, authoritarian abbess or Mother Superior.	The Prioress (Madame Eglantine) in The Canterbury Tales by Geoffrey Chaucer; Sister Luke (Gabrielle van der Mal) in The Nun's Story (1959); Maria von Trapp in The Sound of Music (1965); Sister Mary Clarence (Deloris Van Cartier) in Sister Act (1992); Sister Aloysius Beauvier in Doubt (2008); Sister Jude Martin in American Horror Story: Asylum (2012); Valak (The Demon Nun) in The Conjuring 2 (2016)
Nurse	A healthcare caregiver, historically depicted through several distinct stereotypes in fiction and popular media. Common variations include the selfless "Angel of Mercy," the obedient "physician's handmaiden" or romantic love interest for a doctor, the overly sexualized "naughty nurse," and the authoritarian, sadistic "battle-axe" matron. In classic drama, the nurse also appears as a bawdy, talkative older confidante to a young heroine, while war stories feature the resilient battlefield nurse.	The Nurse in Romeo and Juliet by William Shakespeare; Nurse Ratched in One Flew Over the Cuckoo's Nest (1962); Margaret Houlihan in M*A*S*H (1972–1983); Annie Wilkes in Misery (1987); Carla Espinosa in Scrubs (2001–2010); Jackie Peyton in Nurse Jackie (2009–2015); Jenny Lee in Call the Midwife (2012–present)

== O ==
Character type	Description	Examples
Occult detective	A detective who uses traditional techniques to solve supernatural mysteries. The occult detective may have few or no supernatural powers of their own – or, if possessing such powers, little understanding of how to harness them – and instead rely on someone who does, such as a psychic or medium, as a sidekick.	Carl Kolchak in the 1970s American television drama series Kolchak: The Night Stalker; Fred Jones in the animated American television sitcom series Scooby-Doo; FBI Special Agent Dale Cooper in the 1990s American television satire series Twin Peaks; Melinda Gordon in the 2000s American television drama series The Ghost Whisperer; Reigen Arataka in the 2010s Japanese manga series Mob Psycho 100; Akutabe in You're Being Summoned, Azazel
Oddball/ Misfit	A kindly but misunderstood character who is feared or avoided by everyone else in town. Is often a mad scientist, old war veteran, ex-convict, hobo, or goth girl. May become a reluctant town hero whom the formerly hostile townspeople idolise.	Flint Lockwood in Cloudy with a Chance of Meatballs; Eugene Tackleberry in Police Academy; Kramer in Seinfeld; Louie in Taxi; Carl in Up!; Peter Cushing as Arthur Grimsdyke in Tales from the Crypt; Wednesday Addams in Wednesday; Megamind
Old timer/Mountain man	A common supporting character in Western movies who speaks old fashioned frontier gibberish. Serves as a comic relief sidekick to the hero, especially in singing cowboy movies. Is similar to the British curmudgeon but much friendlier and less misanthropic. Often works as a gold prospector, mountain man or army scout who can speak the Indians' language. Has a long beard and usually wears buckskins with a union suit and coonskin cap or slouch hat. Lives in a log cabin in the forest, rides a stubborn old mule, brews his own moonshine and uses a shotgun or an antiquated long rifle for hunting and carries a Bowie knife. If married, his wife is usually a Native Indian.	Gabby Hayes in Under Nevada Skies; Gabby in Blazing Saddles; Mad Jack in the Life and Times of Grizzly Adams; Charlton Heston in The Mountain Men; Stinky Pete in Toy Story 2; Pappy Yokum in Lil Abner; Kup the gruff old autobot in Transformers: The Movie
Ogre	A fearsome, ill-tempered but stupid giant humanoid with a treasure hoard, usually a cannibal. May possess a magical artefact that the hero must steal.	Blunderbore and Cormoran, the villains of Jack and the Beanstalk and its sequel Jack the Giant Killer; Polyphemus the cyclops tricked by Odysseus; Fleshlumpeater in The BFG by Roald Dahl; Super Mutants in Fallout 3 and Fallout 4; The three Trolls in The Hobbit; The giants in The Silver Chair; The Selfish Giant in his younger years; The giant Immortal in 300; Friendly ogres also exist, such as Grawp from the Harry Potter films, the Ogryns from Warhammer 40K, or Shrek.
Ojou-sama	A wealthy, aristocratic young lady in anime and manga, often depicted with long ringlet curls, a high-pitched haughty laugh, and an entourage of servants or admirers. Initially portrayed as spoiled, prideful, or sheltered from common life, she frequently serves as a rival to the protagonist before revealing vulnerability or loyalty.	Himemiya Anthy and Nanami Kiryū in Revolutionary Girl Utena (1997); Kaguya Shinomiya in Kaguya-sama: Love Is War (2015–2022); Weiss Schnee in RWBY (2013–present); Karin Kanzuki in Street Fighter
Orcs and goblins	A fantasy slave race used as cannon fodder in the Dark lord's wars. An orc's rank is determined by his size, skill at arms, cunning, and aggression. In the absence of a Dark lord, the orcs degenerate into primitive and chaotic warbands. The science fiction equivalents are expendable combat robots, cyborgs and human clones.	The Orcs in Tolkien's Silmarillion, Hobbit and Lord of the Rings; The Orks in Warhammer 40K; Jareth's followers in Labyrinth; Green Goblin in Spider-Man; Jabba the Hutt's Gammorean guards in Star Wars; The Klingons and Borg in Star Trek
Order and Chaos	In grimdark fantasy the forces of good Order and evil Chaos are locked in a perpetual conflict in which neither side can dominate. Sometimes a neutral character such as an eternal champion is required to keep the two sides in balance.	Deadlock the Chaos sorcerer in ABC Warriors; Chaos Space Marines in Hammer and Bolter; Set; Melkor in The Silmarillion; Elric of Melnibone; The Darkwatch; The Archangel Michael in Paradise Lost; God in Preacher; Anton in Night Watch
Orphan	This plucky child is a common protagonist in Dickensian novels. They demonstrate determination and self-reliance as they find their way through life without parents. They are often a street urchin or chimney sweep, or they may be recruited into thievery by a Fagin-type figure. Some orphans may find a loving family/foster parents, join a group of other orphans. Some rise from rags to riches with help from a kindly benefactor, or by having unique skills or gifts.	Harry Potter; Oliver Twist; David Copperfield; Tom in The Water-Babies; Sophie in The BFG; The Baker Street Irregulars; The inhabitants of Miss Peregrine's Home for Peculiar Children; Mary Batson; Sluggo Smith
Outcast/ pariah	A pitiful, impoverished character shunned by society. May be a beggar, LGBT person, prostitute, homeless person, leper, dalit or criminal on parole. For disabled or disfigured outcasts, see Grotesque.	Grizabella in Cats; The mother in Somewhere in Dreamland, hinted to be the village prostitute; Ben Gunn in Treasure Island; Louis in Interview with the Vampire; The cast of Slumdog Millionaire; Vanellope in Wreck-It Ralph; The beggar who protects Kurt in Oktoberfest: Beer and Blood; Ephialtes in 300; SkekGra in The Dark Crystal: Age of Resistance; Smeagol in the prologue to Return of the King
Outlaw/ bandit	An armed robber, can be a murderous villain dressed in black or a romanticized folk hero who robs the rich to feed the poor. In the 19th century bandits were depicted in a romanticised way, often as charismatic and appealing, despite their lawless and violent conduct. Examples include the medieval archer or brigand, the 18th century highwayman, and the train robbers, bank robbers in Western movies, and heist crews in modern stories.	Robin Hood; Jack O'Legs; Dick Turpin; Jesse James in The Assassination of Jesse James by the Coward Robert Ford; Billy the Kid in Young Guns; Eli Wallach as Tuco in The Good, the Bad and the Ugly; Kirk Douglas in The War Wagon; Willie Nelson in Once Upon a Texas Train
Overseer/supervisor/teacher's pet	A person in a lower ranking position of authority who takes advantage of every opportunity to exert power over his subordinates. Often carries a clipboard, swagger stick or a little black book. If he is a schoolboy he will usually be a hall monitor, teacher's pet or prefect.	Blakey in On the Buses; Harris in Police Academy; Himmelstoss in All Quiet on the Western Front; Sylvia Hollamby in Bad Girls; Percy Weasley in Harry Potter; Randall Weems in Recess

== P ==
Character type	Description	Examples
Pacifist/Conchie	A person with an aversion to war and violence, often a hippie, intellectual, or member of a religious group. If drafted into the military, they may serve as an army medic. Although peaceful they are not always harmless. When forced to defend themselves, a superhero or Buddhist monk will use martial arts or nonlethal weapons to subdue an opponent without harming them. If they are a civil rights advocate, they will seek change through protests.	Private Godfrey in Dad's Army; Private Peaceful; Neil in The Young Ones; Toki in Fist of the North Star; Eustace Scrubb in The Voyage of the Dawn Treader; Snufkin in Moomin; Ben Kingsley as Gandhi
Painter/Sculptor/Art student	A creative genius who uses paints, clay or a hammer and chisel to create magnificent works of art. Usually wears a beret and smock-frock and is often French or Italian. In modern times they may draw comic books or work as a tattooist. Art students are impoverished and live in a poor bohemian quarter, where they socialize with writers, musicians and well-off patrons. Modern stories may depict avant-garde performance artists. See also tortured artist struggling with emotional issues or addiction. May have a muse who inspires them.	Neil Buchanan as Smart Arty in Zzzap!; Raymond Briggs in Ethel and Ernest; Elliot Shag in Dog City; Jack in Cool World; Dino in The Girl from Trieste; Paul Kellerman in Hocuspocus; Anthony McCoy in Candyman; Adolf Hitler in Schichlegruber Doing the Lambeth Walk
Pantomime dame/Drag queen	A pantomime portrayal of middle-aged/elderly female characters by male actors in drag of the principal boy's mother or other close relative. She often appears as vain, ridiculous, and accident-prone to provide slapstick entertainment. See also drag queen.	Mother Goose in the adaptations of Old Mother Goose and the Golden Egg; Widow Twankey in the 1788 pantomime Aladdin by John O'Keeffe; Mary Sunshine in the 1975 musical Chicago; Cinderella's ugly sisters; The nurse in Babes in the Wood; The old woman in Dick Whittington; Alec Guinness as Lady Agatha in Kind Hearts and Coronets; Alistair Sim as Headmistress Fritton in The Belles of St. Trinian's; Paul O'Grady in Blankety Blank; John Travolta as Edna Turnblad in Hairspray; Alfred in The Hobbit: Battle of the Five Armies; Ru Paul
Pantomime principal boy	A pantomime portrayal of the protagonist, often a prince, as a young heroic male characters by female actors in drag. Further information: Prince Charming	Prince Charming, often nameless, in many pantomimes; Jack in Jack and the Beanstalk; Aladdin's in the 1788 eponymous pantomime by John O'Keeffe; Peter Pan in the 1904 eponymous pantomime by J.M. Barrie; Mary Pickford as Little Lord Fauntleroy; Shirley Mason as Jim Hawkins in Treasure Island; Cesario in Shakespeare's Twelfth Night
Parasite or moocher	This selfish, manipulative person uses charisma and flattery to get free food and drinks, loans, and boosted social status from wealthy acquaintances. In antiquity, the “kolax” was a classical Roman and Greek comedic stock character who feigned politeness, used flattery and told stories to get free dinners. In modern stories, the moocher is often a comedic character whose constant leeching and lazy "slacker" attitude is played for laughs. A darker version of the parasite character uses guile to attach themselves to a household, with the goal of financially ruining their benefactor and taking their assets.	In Volpone by Ben Jonson, Mosca is a smart, calculating schemer who tries to find a way to inherit a wealthy man's fortune.; In Tartuffe by Molière, the titular character gets into a wealthy household by pretending to be a holy man, but he is secretly plotting to marry the man's daughter and inherit his estate.; In Henry IV by Shakespeare, Falstaff is a jolly, witty teller of stories who freeloads off young Prince Hal at taverns.; In Terence's play Phormio, the titular character is always borrowing money, running scams, and mooching off aristocrats.; In Plautus's play Curculio, the titular character borrows money and fleeces people.; In Timon of Athens, Timon is faced with constant requests for borrowing money or being invited to dinner from a number of lords and artists, who abandon him when he runs out of money.; In Vanity Fair by William Thackeray, Becky Sharp is a witty social climber who moves into the home of well-off families to live rent-free.; In National Lampoon's Van Wilder (2002), Van Wilder (Ryan Reynolds) is a moocher who stays at college for seven years and asks his parents for money so he can party.
Park keeper	This benevolent character takes care of the local park and protects the wild animals that live there. They are deeply committed to wildlife and habitat conservation. Wears a green or tan uniform with a campaign hat. In media set in Africa or America, the heroic park ranger protects the endangered species from evil poachers; in comic works, the ranger also keeps the mischievous anthropomorphic animals and park visitors in line. A closely related character is the zoo keeper.	Ranger Smith in Yogi Bear; J. Audubon Woodlore in the Humphrey the Bear cartoons; Warden Crosby in Safari Adventure; Percy the Park Keeper; Smokey Bear; The unnamed ranger of White Deer Park; A rules-obsessed hemulen who works as a park keeper is the nemesis of Snufkin in Moominsummer Madness
Patriarch/matriarch	The head of a large family, often a parent or grandparent respected for their age and wisdom. May be a rancher, town mayor or tribal chief. In dystopian fiction the patriarch or matriarch is often a dictator.	Papa Smurf; Lorne Green in Bonanza; Hal O'Hobb in The Forest of Boland Light Railway; Pop in Happy Tree Friends; The Mayor in The Cars That Ate Paris; The Commander in The Handmaid's Tale; Immortan Joe in Mad Max 4; Impedimenta in Asterix; The elephants' matriarch in Dumbo
Patrician/Boston Brahmin/Political dynasty	An influential old money family that serves as the power behind the throne. In a Roman Empire setting they are the powerful senators plotting against the Caesar, during the Middle Ages they are powerful lords and barons who have the king's ear, while in modern America they fund candidates for the US Congress, organise political rallies and influence elections. They are proud of their bloodline and look down on the lower classes, but if they expend the last of their inheritance they are often forced to marry into a nouveau riche family.	Sammy Smythe's dad Samson in That Wilkin Boy; Mrs Mousenheimer in An American Tail; The Schemmerhorn family in Gangs of New York; Diedrich Knickerbocker in A History of New York; Lucius Malfoy in Harry Potter; Isabella Puig in Cathedral of the Sea; The Everglot family in Corpse Bride; Kenneth Williams as Julius Caesar in Carry On Cleo; Derek Jacobi as Gracchus in Gladiator
Paul Lynde-type villain/ sissy villain	An easily irritated villain with campy mannerisms and a distinctive, whiny, and slightly effeminate voice – named after character actor Paul Lynde, who played numerous roles in this style during the prime of his career during the 1960s and 1970s and adopted by numerous others after Lynde's death in 1982.	Professor Hinkle in Frosty the Snowman (portrayed by Billy De Wolfe, whose character type predated Lynde's but shared numerous similarities); Norman Normanmeyer in the 1992 American television animated sitcom series The Addams Family; Roger the Alien in the American television animated sitcom series American Dad!; Snow Miser in The Year Without a Santa Claus; Mr. Wint and Mr. Kidd in Diamonds Are Forever; Kaa in The Jungle Book; The Red Guy in Cow and Chicken; Captain Hook in Peter and Wendy; Seymour Cheese in Samurai Pizza Cats
Petrushka/ Mr. Punch	A Russian kind of Pulcinella-type jester, typically who is mischievous, self-serving, gluttonous, aggressive, and cowardly. He is usually at the center of conflict in the Petrushka carnival plays, often getting himself out of trouble by killing the other puppets on stage with a swing of his club.	Petrushka is a ballet by Igor Stravinsky; Judy and Punch reimagines the story in modern times with Judy as a battered wife seeking revenge on her alcoholic domestic abuser husband; The protagonists of Charade watch a Punch and Judy show; In the Muppet Christmas Carol Mr Punch is seen beating up the crocodile; In DC Comics the Joker has two henchmen named Punch and Judy
Pierrot	In French pantomime, a sad clown in a distinctive all-white attire and makeup, often pining for the love of Columbina, who usually breaks his heart and leaves him for Harlequin.	Canio in the 1892 tragic operetta Pagliacci ("The Clowns") by Ruggero Leoncavallo; Puddles the Clown as the alter-ego character in Puddles Pity Party modeled on Pagliacci; The Tramp, created and played by Charlie Chaplin, updated this character in numerous silent films of the early 20th century; Harpo Marx; Pierrot in Smile PreCure!; In the Presence of a Clown; Kenneth Anger in Rabbit's Moon
Pigpen	A dirty, scruffy and lazy person who hates having baths and working. Is often an agricultural labourer or a vagrant who lives in a trash can. They may have bad breath and body odor. Their clothes are grimy and their hair is tangled and dirty. While they are often male, they can be female.	Pigpen in Peanuts; Hobo Suntot in Stop The Smoggies; Oscar the Grouch in Sesame Street; Pigpen the trucker in Convoy; Tom the hospital orderly in Quacks; Sodoff Baldrick in Blackadder; The title character of Eileen by Ottessa Moshfegh is a 24-year-old depressed woman who does not bathe or wash her hands.
Pimp	A common antagonist in 70s blaxploitation films involved with prostitution and drug dealing. Has a moustache, afro hair and gold teeth, uses jive talk, wears a fur coat with a satin shirt and gold chain, and drives a decrepit 1950s or 1960s Cadillac with leopardskin seats and flashy paint job. He is often an informant who passes on information to the cops. A female pimp or brothel madam is usually an older, retired ex-prostitute.	Huggy Bear in Starsky & Hutch; Stevie Elias in Foxy Brown; King George in Coffy; Esteban Vihaio in Kill Bill Vol. 2; Mommy in Cleopatra Jones is a lesbian pimp and drug dealer; Mona Stangley in the Best Little Whorehouse in Texas; The madam in Brotherhood of the Wolf; Sacha Baron Cohen as Ali G
Pirate	A romanticized stereotype of high seas pirates of the 18th century. Features may include a black tricorn hat with skull and crossbones, unkempt facial hair, missing body parts (e.g. eyepatch, peg leg, hook for a hand), adventurous but surly demeanor, a love of drinking and debauchery, and a distinctive accent. They are typically heavily armed with sabres, knives, and muskets. Variants on the theme include air pirates and space pirates.	Long John Silver in the 1883 adventure novel Treasure Island by Robert Louis Stevenson; Captain Hook in the 1904 play and subsequent 1911 novel Peter Pan by J.M. Barrie; Captain Blood in the eponymous 1922 novel by Rafael Sabatini and the 1935 film starring Errol Flynn; Patchy the Pirate in the 2000s American animated sitcom series SpongeBob SquarePants; Jack Sparrow in Pirates of the Caribbean; Han Solo, Richard B Riddick and Yondu are examples of space pirates.; Air pirates appear in Robur the Conqueror, Dakota Harris, Porco Rosso, and Castle in the Sky.
Player/ adulterer/ polygamist	A charismatic, attractive lothario who has two lovers or wives at the same time, or seduces many women. May be a gigolo paid to commit adultery with married women, or a charming cad who seduces virgins for his own amusement. If he is a villain "fortune hunter", he will discard or murder his conquests after swindling them out of their dowry.	Don Juan; Casanova; Lothario in The Fair Penitent; Deuce Bigalow: Male Gigolo; Richard Gere as the American Gigolo; Bill Paxton in Big Love; Enoch Drebber in A Study in Scarlet; Bluebeard; Barkis Bittern in Corpse Bride
Polack	Historically, the Pole is a resistance fighter defending his home from German barbarism or Russian tyranny. In an early modern setting he is usually a dashing hussar or lancer due to Poland's strong cavalry tradition. In modern war films he will be part of the Free Polish Army or Home Army partisans. In American comedy, the Polack is an Eastern European immigrant of large size and strength but unorthodox or seemingly stupid ways, such as changing lightbulbs by having his friends turn the stool underneath him. Usually works in a steel mill or as a construction worker, similar to older stereotypes of Irish, German and Italian immigrants. May have a love of polka music, dogs, mountain climbing, bison grass vodka, pierogi, goulash and dumplings. An ethnic variant of the gentle giant. Other Eastern European ethnicities, such as Czechs, Ukrainians, Lithuanians, Latvians, and Hungarians (honkies), may be treated similarly.	Daniel Craig as Tuvia Bielski in Defiance; A Bear Named Wojtek; Wladyslaw in The Pianist; Four Tank-Men and a Dog; Bogdan in 1670; Alicja in Warsaw 44; Jaws in The Spy Who Loved Me; Jacob the Liar; Lenny Kosnowski in Laverne & Shirley; The Certain Ethnic... a recurring sketch on Big Chuck and Lil' John; Yosh Shmenge on SCTV; Lewis Kiniski on The Drew Carey Show
Police inspector/chief of police	In detective stories and police procedurals, this can either be the investigating detective or the police officer is the leader of the law enforcement organization. The title often varies by country or region – chief constable, police commissioner, detective inspector, etc. — but they have a similar role, which is to lead the police detectives and uniformed officers and liaises with forensic experts and may be a Holmsian consulting detective to solve a crime or mystery. Police inspectors range from strict "by-the-books" types to those who will "bend" the rules to catch the perpetrator, as they feel "hampered by officialdom" (as Inspector Poirot states in The Patriotic Murders). A subtype is the chief who is a Corrupt cop.	Inspector Lestrade in the Sherlock Holmes series of novels by Arthur Conan Doyle; Inspector Columbo, a detective known for his rumpled appearance and unusual questions in the 1980s eponymous US television detective series; Andrew Bogomil in Beverly Hills Cop; Chief Hopper in Stranger Things; Detective Chief Inspector Endeavour Morse in the eponymous series of novels by Colin Dexter and the television adaptations Morse and Endeavour; Chief Inspector Armand Gamache in the eponymous series of novels by Louise Penny; Lieutenant Eve Dallas in Death by J.D. Robb
Political commissar	In Cold war stories set in Soviet and Eastern-bloc countries, political commissars are well-educated, high-ranking functionaries in military units who are in charge of communist political propaganda and indoctrination. Commissars are depicted as ruthless enforcers of ideology and party discipline. In socialist realism fiction, they are depicted as being heroic in battles to inspire the soldiers. They wear a high, peaked hat and wear a sidearm. Science fiction stories may have characters called liaison officers or corporate representatives who play a similar role on spaceships.	In the 2001 film Enemy at the Gates, the political commissar Danilov (Joseph Fiennes) is a highly intelligent, ruthless enforcer of discipline and Party ideology who tries to exploit a skilled sniper as a propaganda tool. Other political commissars execute soldiers who retreat.; In the 1990 film The Hunt for Red October, Ivan Putin (played by Peter Firth), is a political commissar who enforces Party loyalty on an advanced Russian submarine. He shows his erudition when he quotes the Bhagavad Gita ("I am become Death, the Destroyer of Worlds").; In the film K-19: The Widowmaker, Captain 3rd Rank Igor Suslov (Ravil Isyanov) is the Political Officer. He watches a submarine's officers and crew to ensure loyalty and gives ideological lectures against capitalism to boost morale.; Yarrick in Hammer and Bolter; Ibram Gaunt of Gaunt's Ghosts; Strelnikov in Doctor Zhivago; Delov in The Death of Stalin; Major Pribluda in Gorky Park; Raul Julia as M. Bison in Street Fighter; In The Three-Body Problem by Cixin Liu, Lei Zhicheng is a political commissar at the secret Red Coast Base who watches the protagonist, Ye Wenjie.
Pollyanna	This stock character is heavily biased towards seeing the world as positive and is excessively cheerful, even in the face of adversity. Their optimism is excessive to the point of naïveté or refusing to accept the facts of an unfortunate situation. A Manic Pixie Dream Girl may adopt a Pollyanna-type role to help the male protagonist become inspired. The stock character originated from the cheerful titular character of the children's novel Pollyanna by Eleanor H. Porter, who had an unfailingly optimistic outlook.	The video game series Mother (known in the U.S. as EarthBound) has consistently featured variations of a song, which in its first incarnation was called Pollyanna. The title is a reference to the novel, and refers to a woman who would gladly be "called Pollyanna", or otherwise be considered foolish in her unyielding optimism.; Green Day released a song called "Pollyanna" in 2021. The song title refers to excessive optimism, and also refers to the main protagonist of the novel.; In Voltaire's novel Candide, the professor Dr. Pangloss views all of life positively, even when kidnapped or sold into slavery.; In Disney's Cinderella, the titular character is unfailingly cheerful, even when her mean stepmother and stepsisters bully her.; In Frozen, Anna maintains a cheerful attitude throughout the story.; In the 1982 film Annie, even when the titular character is sent to an orphanage, she continues to remain optimistic, which transforms the mood of all the girls at the facility.
Preppy	A stock character of the 1980s films and television, or in other works set in this era, preppies are well-off, fashionably-dressed students or alumnus of Ivy League schools who have American upper class speech, vocabulary, dress, mannerisms and etiquette. Like the related yuppie stock character of the 1980s, preppies range from benign (albeit materialistic and pretentious), to arrogant or even immoral. In movies set during the 1950s, the antagonistic rich kids are known as Socs, Rahs, Jocks or Squares and usually wear baseball jackets.	Jake in the 1984 film Sixteen Candles; Steff McKee and Blane McDonough in the 1986 film Pretty in Pink; Fred in Scooby-Doo; Dennis in Christine; The upper class antagonists in The Outsiders; The Squares in Cry-Baby; The Socs in Indiana Jones and the Kingdom of the Crystal Skull
Priest	A member of the clergy, most commonly a Roman Catholic or Anglican minister, who serves as a moral guide, confidant, or symbol of spiritual authority. Common variations include the compassionate parish father who acts as a detective or community mediator, the tormented or doubting cleric struggling with faith and celibacy, the comedic or eccentric country parson, and the corrupt or fanatical inquisitor in gothic and historical fiction. In horror fiction, the priest frequently appears as a brave exorcist confronting demonic forces.	Don Abbondio in The Betrothed (1827) by Alessandro Manzoni; Father Brown in the short stories by G. K. Chesterton; Father Chuck O'Malley in Going My Way (1944); Father Damien Karras and Father Lankester Merrin in The Exorcist (1973); Father Ralph de Bricassart in The Thorn Birds (1977); Father Ted Crilly in Father Ted (1995–1998); The Priest in Fleabag (2019)
Prince Charming	A handsome and courageous stock character, who is the romantic hero of fairy tales who coming to the rescue of a damsel in distress or princesse lointaine and so must engage in a quest to liberate her from an evil spell. A historical prince may hold a noble title such as Archduke or Count. This archetype is essentially interchangeable across many traditional folk tales – often given no name at all – serving as a foil to the heroine; in many variants, they can be viewed as a metaphor for a reward the heroine achieves for the decisions she makes.	Prince Tamino, the protagonist tenor role in the 1791 opera The Magic Flute by W.A. Mozart; Prince James/David Nolan, played by Josh Dallas, in the 2010s American television series Once Upon a Time; Duke Orsino in Shakespeare's Twelfth Night; Leto I Atreides in Dune; Count Dzerzhinsky in Virgin Territory; Prince Harry in the Black Adder; Prince Barin in Flash Gordon; The princes in: Cinderella; Sleeping Beauty; Snow White
Princesse lointaine	The princesse lointaine role is an idealistic romantic love interest and beloved sweetheart for a knight-errant or a Prince Charming. Usually, a wealthy woman of much higher noble birth, beautiful, and of admirable character. Often far distant from the knight, some having become smitten in love with the princess without seeing her, owing merely to hearing descriptions of her, due to her beauty and virtue.	Queen Guinevere in the ancient British Arthurian Legends; Dulcinea del Toboso, the unseen apple of the eponymous decrepit hidalgo's eye in 1615 two-part novel Don Quixote by Miguel de Cervantes; Princess Pamina, the heroine soprano role in the 1791 opera The Magic Flute by W.A. Mozart
Prison warden	A villainous character who abuses his position of trust at a county jail, hospital or insane asylum. Usually talks with a southern drawl. He will order beatings, torture, solitary confinement, food or sleep deprivation, and sometimes extrajudicial killing of prisoners from the chain gang who show defiance or try to escape. In war films the Japanese or Nazi prison camp commandant will show similar behaviour (see also Hun). The female equivalent is in charge of an orphanage or hospital ward and is often a sadistic nun or nurse.	Jim Fenner in Bad Girls; Police superintendent Cobham in Mad Dog Morgan; The Captain in Cool Hand Luke; Warden Barrot in Papillon; Nurse Ratched in One Flew Over the Cuckoo's Nest; Oberst Von Luger in The Great Escape; Henry Wirz in Andersonville; Miss Hannigan in Little Orphan Annie
Prodigal son/Black sheep	A wayward adult child as exemplified in the parable of The Return of the Prodigal Son. The wayward son has become estranged from their family and gone into exile, where they squander their inheritance on a debauched lifestyle, while their older sibling works hard. Then the estranged adult child suffers a reversal of fortune and ends up doing a low-paid job to make ends meet, which leads them to repenting, and they return home, where the kind, loving father forgives the adult child and welcomes them home with a celebration. The name of the stock character comes from the Parable of the Prodigal Son (Luke 15:11–32), in which the young son who has lost his way symbolizes the sinners and tax collectors (see Luke 15:1), the hardworking elder brother symbolizes the self-righteous Pharisees, and the kind father symbolizes God. Novels, films and other stories that use the prodigal son stock character may depict a son or a daughter who returns, and rather than have the person who returns be from a family, they may be a member of a school, team, or organization who returns after going through a reversal of fortune. The benevolent father figure may be a mentor, elder, or leader.	Jamie in the 1956 play Long Day's Journey into Night by Eugene O'Neill; Former student Quentin, referred to as a prodigal son by Dean Fogg on his return to the magical school in the 2011 novel The Magician King by Lev Grossman; Bo West in Follow That Camel enlists in the Foreign Legion after disgracing his family; In Godspell, at the end of Act 1, Jesus is a drill sergeant leading his soldiers, who act out the Parable of the Prodigal Son; In Death of a Salesman, which is about a father who is a traveling salesman who has two adult sons: Happy, who works in business like his father, is ignored by the dad, and Biff, who moves away and becomes a ranch hand, is the prodigal son that the dad had high ambitions for him; In the play Long Day's Journey into Night, an actor in his mid-60s has two sons. One, Jamie, the prodigal son, is a ne'er-do-well actor who puts more effort into drinking and having liaisons with prostitutes than acting. The other son is a poet who caught tuberculosis while traveling in the Merchant Marine; Titus Groan in Titus Awakes; In Run Away by Harlan Coben, teenage girl Paige Greene drops out of university and becomes a drug addict and thief
Proletarian/Plebeian/Commoner	A downtrodden person from the lower classes who lives in slum housing and works long hours for low wages and spends their little free time in the bar drinking cheap booze. Some my have a hidden talent such as singing or dancing that enables him to rise above their lot in life. A Russian or Eastern bloc proletarian is often a socialist revolutionary or Stakhanovite "heroic worker". In British dramas he is often a drinking, brawling "angry young man".	Lenny and Carl in The Simpsons; The cast of Plebs; Baldrick in Blackadder; Oryx and Crake; The proles in 1984; The workers in Metropolis; Charlie Chaplin in Modern Times; The Russian exile Szczepansky in The Railway Children
Prophet	An old man with a long white beard who claims to have the ability to foresee the future and perform miracles on behalf of a deity. A common protagonist in medieval mystery plays. If he is a villain he is either insane, or a charlatan cult leader.	Charlton Heston in The Ten Commandments; Samuel in King David; Abraham in Testament: The Bible in Animation; Elijah in Sins of Jezebel; Russell Crowe as Noah; The boy scouts put on a performance of Noah's Ark in Moonrise Kingdom; Elias Tate in The Divine Invasion; Philippulus the Prophet in The Shooting Star; Mama Murphy in Fallout 4
Psychic	A person with mental powers such as telepathy, telekinesis or prophecy. Can be a wizard, superhero or supervillain. When the powers are supernatural in origin, see Medium.	Professor X of the X-Men; Anya Forger in Spy × Family; Tatsumaki in One-Punch Man; Severus Snape; Qui-Gon Jinn; Fiver in Watership Down; Mewtwo in the Pokémon franchise; Dr. Mabuse
Psycho-biddy	Typically, an old woman who is embittered faded ex-celebrity, usually with psychotic tendencies.	Baby Jane Hudson, played by Bette Davis, in the 1950 film Whatever happened to Baby Jane directed by Robert Aldrich; Norma Desmond, played by Gloria Swanson, in the 1950 film Sunset Boulevard by Billy Wilder; Joan Crawford, as played by Faye Dunaway, in the 1981 biographical film Mommie Dearest
Psychotic manchild/ Evil prince	The evil counterpart to the manchild, a narcissistic, impulsive and spoiled tyrant with the mind of a small child. May suffer from mental retardation due to generations of incestuous cousin marriage and often has daddy issues due to being the least favored child. The psychotic manchild is unfit to be king due to his cruelty, selfishness and vanity but nevertheless inherits the throne from his virtuous father or older brother, sometimes as the result of regicide. Is usually aided in his scheming by a treacherous and manipulative flunky like the vizier or eunuch who will often be on the receiving end of the evil prince's violent outbursts. Will often be an evil uncle if the good king left an heir before he died.	King John of England in Disney's Robin Hood; King Hamdo in Now and Then, Here and There; Edmund Blackadder Duke of Edinburgh in The Black Adder; Malcolm McDowell as Caligula; Joffrey Baratheon in Game of Thrones; Ozai in The Last Airbender; Nero in Quo Vadis; Caracalla and Geta in Gladiator 2
Puritan/witch finder	A religious fanatic driven by a desire to purge society of sinful influences. Usually wears black clothing with a simple white collar and a tall pilgrim hat. In comedy, he is a miserable killjoy who hates Christmas, music and the theatre. In more serious dramas he is a roundhead officer, witch hunter, abusive slave owner or colonialist.	Malvolio in Twelfth Night; Lady Whiteadder Blackadder II; Vincent Price as Matthew Hopkins the Witchfinder General.; Arthur Miller's The Crucible; Richard Harris as the titular character in Cromwell; Dougray Scott and Tim Roth in To Kill a King; Colonel Judd in The Scarlet Blade; In Addams Family Values the secondary antagonists at Camp Chippewa portray Puritans in a Thanksgiving play.; Solomon Kane; Hanniver Toll in Hammer and Bolter

== Q ==
Character type	Description	Examples
Quincy punk	An "establishment showbiz" version of punks – dubbed "Quincy punks" after a 1982 episode of the TV series Quincy, M.E., about a crime-solving medical examiner, appearing in the episode "Next Stop, Nowhere" that depicted punks as nihilistic "spiky-haired teenagers and flippant young adults" full of "punk rage", who are "cartoonishly naive and short-sighted" thinking with a "rigid ideology and relentless hopelessness" — shown with "torn clothes, spiked hair, bizarre makeup, and (for some reason) bandanas". Maclean's calls it a "fake Hollywood-ized version of a punk."	Abby, the rebellious teen played by Melora Hardin, in the 1982 episode "Next Stop, Nowhere" of the television series Quincy, M.E.; Nameless punks who are vandalizing an observatory and then attempt to rob the titular humanoid robot in the opening of The Terminator; The Night Slasher's henchmen in Cobra; Manny in Death Wish 3; Cain's gang in RoboCop 2; The scavengers in Fury Road; The smokers in Waterworld

== R ==
Character type	Description	Examples
Railroad engineer	The driver of a steam locomotive or other railroad engine. Like their maritime equivalent, the sea captain, they tend to be rugged, brave in the face of danger, and highly competent. In children's stories and thrillers set in railroads, the train engineer is usually the hero.	Children's stories: Casey Jones in The Brave Engineer; Jones the Steam in Ivor the Engine; Vicar Sam Weech in The Titfield Thunderbolt; Smokey and Steamer in The Polar Express; Thomas the Tank Engine's driver and stoker; Mickey Mouse in Mickey's Choo-Choo; The friendly train driver in The Wind in the Willows; Other fiction: In Unstoppable (2010), an experienced train engineer and a young conductor must find a way to stop a long freight train that is speeding towards a metropolis without a driver.; In Rails & Ties (2007), a train engineer and a young child bond after the child survives a train collision that kills his mother.
Rake/bad boy/bounder/cad/libertine/Latin lover	The "tall, dark, and handsome" sharply-dressed Byronesque archetype of a roguish and sometimes macho young, seductive man – or bad boy — who habitually behaves immorally, and especially is a gambler and womanizer. He is suave and confident in demeanor with elegant courtship and dancing skills, typically in the tango seen in the Latin lover. Paradoxically, he shows both tenderness and "sexual danger". He draws the woman into a passionate romance that is doomed due to the pair being enmeshed in an intrigue. In his frequent sexual affairs, he shows manipulativeness and a little concern for the woman's feelings. The archetype is the prodigal son, prior to his redemption on returning home and is the antithesis of the boy next door. If this character's actions tip into criminality, then he is seen definitely as an antagonist or anti-hero. Typically, lovers of this self-destructive character are in the seriously mistaken belief that they can reform him or otherwise are a ride-or-die chick — the female equivalent.	The prodigal son in the Parables of Jesus in the Bible; Don Juan / Don Giovanni in numerous 18th & 19th-century stories and plays; Danny Zuko, the protagonist in the 1971 musical Grease; Tony Manero, played by John Travolta in the 1977 film Saturday Night Fever and its 1983 sequel Staying Alive; Glenn Quagmire in the animated American television sitcom series Family Guy; Dr. Gregory House in the 2000s American television medical drama House; Barney Stinson, played by Neil Patrick Harris, in the 2000s American television sitcom series How I Met Your Mother; Tony Stark / Iron Man in the Marvel Comics
Rag and bone man, peddler or scrap dealer	A grubby, penny-pinching character with a dark or mysterious past who runs a scrapyard or sketchy used goods business. They often try to pass off slipshod merchandise or cheat customers and they haggle aggressively. They drive a horse and cart or decrepit pick-up truck or van. They are often a Londoner, Irish traveller or Eastern European immigrant. The junkyard may be a front for organized crime and the junkyard man may work for the local mafia boss, who uses the car junkyard to conceal or destroy evidence or hide contraband. Illegal goods and contraband may be available for the right price.	Steptoe and Son; Watto from Star Wars; Jafar in Aladdin impersonated a junk dealer who exchanged new lamps for old; A Junkman wants to scrap Chitty Chitty Bang Bang; Brian Edison buys a Willys Americar from a junk dealer to rebuild into the titular Hot Rod; Josiah Oldcastle buys Gumdrop from a friendly scrap merchant; Drug dealer Mommy in Cleopatra Jones owns a junkyard where the corpses of murder victims are concealed; Fagin in Oliver and Company
Rancher/Farmer/American pioneer	In Western films, an immigrant who travelled across the prairie in a covered wagon during the era of Westward expansion and constructed a log cabin homestead to raise cattle and grow crops. A particularly ruthless and successful rancher may become a cattle baron who hires a corrupt sheriff or gang of bandits to terrorise the other ranchers into selling their land so he can build a railway or drill for crude oil.	Homesteaders: The Ingalls family in Little House on the Prairie; Maureen O'Hara as The Redhead from Wyoming; The Williams family in Oklahoma!; The Dutton family in Yellowstone; Cattle/Oil barons: The Cartwright family in Bonanza; Tom Cruise in Digger; Jock Ewing in Dallas; Murphy in Young Guns; Daniel Day-Lewis in There Will Be Blood
Raw recruit/Greenhorn	Young, impressionable, and naive, who has to learn how to live with military discipline and understand the reasons behind the way the military works, often ending up in a position of leadership and / or may have a tragic death. In cop shows the rookie fresh from the academy is often partnered with a cowboy cop who disregards the rules.	Charlie Sage and his fellow conscripts in the 1958 film Carry On Sergeant; Juan Rico in the book Starship Troopers by Robert A. Heinlein; a parody of this character is "Dead Meat" from the comedy Hot Shots!, whose obviously impending doom is played for laughs; "Soap" MacTavish from Call of Duty 4: Modern Warfare also fits this category, becoming a captain in the sequel; Jamie Bell in Deathwatch; Richard Bolitho begins his naval career as a 17-year-old midshipman on HMS Gorgon; Larvell Jones in Police Academy 2; Judge Anderson in Dredd
Real estate agent/ salesperson	A pushy huckster who sells houses, double glazing or household products such as vacuum cleaners. Like the used car salesman, the products he sells are often defective. May also be involved with pyramid scams. Wears a grey or blue power suit with a loud kipper tie and drives a Jag or Mercedes-Benz.	Horace Hamster in Huxley Pig; Charles Deetz in Beetlejuice; Thomas Hutter in Nosferatu; George in It's A Wonderful Life; Tom in The Operative: No One Lives Forever; The Vault-Tec representative in Fallout 4; Peggy in King of the Hill; Ginny & Georgia; Vincent in White Gold
Rebel / maverick	A character who refuses to follow society's rules and conventions, who may simultaneously be a loner or hotshot.	Jim Stark played by James Dean in Rebel Without a Cause; Dirty Harry in the eponymous film series; John Bender in the 1985 film The Breakfast Club; Bart Simpson in the US animated television sitcom series The Simpsons; Klaus Kinski as the anarchist prisoner in Doctor Zhivago; Paul Newman as Cool Hand Luke
Red herring character	In mystery novels, detective novels and thrillers, a red herring character is someone who appears suspicious to the sleuth, either because they are behaving evasively or lying, or because they have motivation, means, and/or opportunity to have committed the crime. The red herring character may have a mysterious or shady past that throws suspicion on them or they may be acting strangely. In the end, though, the sleuth realizes that despite the red herring character's seeming potential for being the culprit, they could not have committed the crime.	*In Sir Arthur Conan Doyle's Sherlock Holmes story, The Hound of the Baskervilles, the detective finds a number of suspects. The Barrymores seem mysterious and Stapleton seems suspicious, but they are red herring characters who are distracting Holmes from the real culprit.: In The Five Red Herrings, a 1931 novel by Dorothy L. Sayers, the gentleman detective named Lord Peter Wimsey must solve the murder of a painter, for whom six local artists have a motive to have killed him. Lord Wimsey realizes that one of the six is the criminal and five are red herrings.; In Dan Brown's The Da Vinci Code, Bishop Aringarosa seems to be at the core the church's conspiracies, but later in the novel, it is revealed that he is a red herring who distracts attention from the antagonist who is responsible.
Redneck	A staple character in the 1970s "hixploitation" B movies, appearing as Appalachian or Southern "good old boys" involved in illicit moonshine operations. Redneck sub-types include the crooked Southern sheriff, the "back-road racer", and truckers.	Bo and Luke Duke in the 1980s US television sitcom series The Dukes of Hazzard; Buddy Thunderstruck in the eponymous US animated television sitcom series; Bubba J, a Jeff Dunham ventriloquist character; Drayton Sawyer in Texas Chainsaw massacre; Desiree Thibodeau's abusive father Leroy Bracken and half-brothers Pete and TJ in Gator Bait; Gene Hackman's henchmen in Prime Cut
Redshirts	Minor, expendable cannon fodder characters who are killed soon after being introduced. This term refers to characters from the original Star Trek television series, from the security or engineering departments of the starship, who wore red Starfleet uniforms. A redshirt who survives may be promoted to mauve shirt and become a recurring background character.	Stormtroopers in the Star Wars film series; Little Goomba in the platform video game series Super Mario Bros.; Jenkins in the media franchise Mass Effect; O-Ren Ishi's yakuza ninjas, the Crazy 88; Any British soldier in the Sharpe series who isn't a commissioned officer or a chosen man of the 95th Rifles.; Guy Fleegman in Galaxy Quest is a redshirt who became a mauve shirt.
Reformed villain	Unlike the mole who pretends to be on the side of the bad guys, the reformed villain was genuinely evil at the beginning before switching sides. The heel-face turn may be motivated by self-preservation, a grudge against the overlord or being saved by the hero. In many instances he sacrifices himself to gain redemption.	Dinobot in Beast Wars; Mr Belcher in Earth Warp; Peace in Wizards; Darth Vader in Return of the Jedi; Jaws in Moonraker; Zangiev in Street Fighter; Katharine Hepburn in The Iron Petticoat
Reluctant hero	A protagonist who is thrust against their will into a heroic role, which overlaps with the everyman character.	John McClane in the Die Hard film series; Harry Potter in the eponymous book series by J. K. Rowling; Neo in The Matrix film series; Shaun Riley in the 2004 film Shaun of the Dead; Arthur in The Hitch-hiker's Guide to the Galaxy; Rincewind in Discworld; Bilbo Baggins in The Hobbit
Ride-or-die chick	A woman willing to support her partner and their risky lifestyle, despite how this might endanger or harm her, who may even take an active role as an accomplice. This character is the female form of the rake character and is a variant of the gangster's moll.	Bonnie Parker played by Faye Dunaway in the 1967 film Bonnie and Clyde; McCoy and Baby Doll in the 1984 neo-noir film Streets of Fire; Letty Ortiz in the Fast & Furious film series; Kane's girlfriend in Robocop 2; Mallory Knox in Natural Born Killers; Captain Spalding's daughter Baby in The Devil's Rejects
Rightful king	A usurped, just ruler whose return or triumph restores peace, who may be as well a reluctant hero, reticent to take the throne. A benevolent caliph, tsar or Chinese emperor may wander the kingdom disguised as a peasant or vagrant to hear the latest rumours and reward subjects who show him kindness.	King Arthur in the ancient Anglo-Welsh legends; King Richard in the legends of Robin Hood; Duke Senior in the play As You Like It by William Shakespeare; Pastoria; Aragorn in the book The Lord of the Rings by J. R. R. Tolkien; Simba in The Lion King film series; Ignosi in King Solomon's Mines; Ulysses disguises himself as a beggar in The Odyssey; Optimus Prime chooses a humble commercial vehicle alter ego rather than the weapon or military vehicle based forms of the Decepticons.
Ringmaster	The owner of a travelling circus. May be an idealistic, flamboyant showman with ambitions to make it big, a huckster, or a ruthless tyrant who exploits the performers and is cruel to the animals.	Hugh Jackman as the young P. T. Barnum in The Greatest Showman; Roger Ashton-Griffiths as an older Barnum in Gangs of New York; Morpheus in Little Nemo in Slumberland is king of the sleeping world and a carnival owner in the real world; Charlton Heston in The Greatest Show On Earth; Professor Screweyes in A Dinosaur's Story; The Ringmaster in Dumbo; August Rosenbluth in Water for Elephants; Angelica Pickles in Episode 44 of Rugrats
Rival/Love rat	A variant of the player or bad boy who competes with the protagonist for the affections of the girl next door. Is frequently a spoiled, rich and misogynistic jock bully who sees women as sex objects. In softcore porn films he often kicks sand in the hero's face and steals his girl. In slapstick comedy the love rat usually takes rejection badly, resulting in the meek lovable loser finally gaining the courage to punch him.	Reggie in The Archie Show; Biff Tannen in Back to the Future; Matt in Encino Man; Romulo in Maria Magdalena; Muggy Mike in Love Island; Sir Andrew Aguecheek in Twelfth Night; Teddy Tambourine in That Wilkin Boy
Robots and androids	A staple of science fiction stories that include artificial mechanical beings, which are typically autonomous programmable machines including stark functional robots, such as an industrial robot, and more human-like robotic beings with flesh-like bodies such as androids. These robotic beings have varying levels of artificial intelligence (AI) or independent thought, spanning from a narrow range of programmed actions to beings constrained by strict rules, to having a human-like artificial intelligence beings with free will. Robotic beings may be depicted with a range of characters – ranging from benevolent, neutral, or aggressive killer robots – and typically having a vast range of informational knowledge, but little wisdom as to its application. See also Artificial intelligence and Cyborg.	Robbie the Robot in the 1956 film Forbidden Planet; The robot patients of the chief robopsychologist Susan Calvin in the 1950 book of short stories I, Robot by Isaac Asimov; R2-D2 and C-3PO in the Star Wars film series; Marvin the Paranoid Android, a depressed and neurotic robot, in The Hitchhiker's Guide to the Galaxy series by Douglas Adams; Slave and Orac in the 1970s BBC television series Blake's 7; Maximilian in the 1979 film The Black Hole; Ava played by Alicia Vikander is an attractive and charismatic AI fembot in the film Ex Machina
Ronin, drifter or gunfighter	A wandering samurai who has not sworn fealty to a feudal overlord, similar to the knight-errant from medieval literature. The lone gunslinger, bounty hunter, mercenary and drifter characters from spaghetti westerns and post-apocalyptic movies were inspired by these Japanese antiheroes.	Hyakkimaru in Dororo; Ogami Itto in Shogun Assassin; Nanashi in Sword of the Stranger; Sakon in Wrath of the Ninja; Yojimbo; Keanu Reeves in the 47 Ronin; The man in black in The Ballad of Buster Scruggs; Clint Eastwood as the Man with No Name; Gordon in The Great Silence; Franco Nero as Django; Johnny Depp as Rango; Jack in Furiosa; Joe Lara in Steel Frontier
Ruritanians/ Austro-Hungarians	Inhabitants of a small and isolated central European or Balkan kingdom formerly part of the Austro-Hungarian Empire. It regularly fights small inconclusive border skirmishes with similar neighbouring kingdoms, with both sides claiming victory. In a modern setting, the Ruritanians still live in the same way as their ancestors in the Middle Ages. The peasants are superstitious, wear archaic folk costume such as lederhosen, and distrust outsiders. The country's main public holiday celebrates a battle against the Turks centuries ago that led to the kingdom's independence. The palace courtiers wear powdered wigs, houses are lit by candles or torches, the capital city has only one old fashioned payphone, trains are still hauled by steam locomotives, the army has ox-drawn muzzle loading cannons and horse cavalry armed with lances, the navy comprises a few small rowing boats and one paddle steamer converted into a river gunboat, and the air force consists of biplanes. The autocratic ruler has a grandiose title such as king, crown prince or archduke, lives in an ancient castle last renovated during the baroque era, collects British and German luxury cars, and always wears a flashy hussar uniform. He is generally eccentric but benevolent like King Zog of Albania or Nicholas I of Montenegro, although tyrants also exist (see Evil Prince).	Muskar XII of Syldavia in King Ottokar's Sceptre; Groucho Marx as the king of Freedonia in Duck Soup; Peter Sellers as Count Mountjoy of Grand Fenwick in The Mouse that Roared; Jack Lemmon as Prince Hapnick in the Great Race; Harry Flashman in Royal Flash; The Prisoner of Zenda; Gert Frobe as Baron Bomburst of Vulgaria in Chitty Chitty Bang Bang; The Hungarian peasants at the inn in Nosferatu; The Burgermeister in Santa Claus is Comin' to Town; The inhabitants of Gormenghast castle; Borat's family; Tom and Jerry in Johann Mouse; Daddy Jones in The Exploits of Moominpappa; In Discworld Lord Veterinari is ruler of Ankh-Morpork, a Ruritanian city state undergoing modernisation
Russian	A communist with a fur ushanka and striped T-shirt who loves vodka, chess and bare knuckle fighting. Drives a Lada Riva, plays the balalaika and often has a pet wolfdog or bear. Is typically cold, calculating and ruthless. May be associated with organized crime or work for the KGB or similar organizations and may have previous military experience. His female counterpart may be a butch lesbian or a seductive, dark-haired femme fatale. A variant in science fiction is the grizzled cosmonaut who is calm in the face of danger.	Lev Andropov in Armageddon; The Russian in The Punisher; Alexei Zeysan in Rambo III; Arkady Renko in Gorky Park; The dancing thistles in Disney's Fantasia; Anatoly Dyatlov in Chernobyl; Meg's boyfriend Yuri in Family Guy; Anton Vanko in Iron Man 2; Rosa Klebb in From Russia With Love; Mother Russia in Kick-Ass 2; Natasha Fatale in Boris and Natasha
"Runyonesque" characters	Characters with colorful monikers, who use equally colorful street slang, appearing in short stories by US author and sports writer, Damon Runyon, which depicts a Prohibition era underworld populated by New Yorkers from Brooklyn or Midtown Manhattan — gamblers, bookies, boxers, hustlers, actors, and gangsters – few of whom go by "square" names, preferring creative nicknames. ["Runyonesque" refers to the type of situations and dialog that Runyon depicted,]	Nathan Detroit; Benny Southstreet; Big Jule; Harry the Horse; Good Time Charley; Dave the Dude; The Seldom Seen Kid

== S ==
Character type	Description	Examples
Santa Claus	The jolly big man with the beard, red suit and sack of gifts makes regular appearances in holiday-themed movies and other fictional works. A more recent variant has an imposter impersonating Santa, either in a good faith effort to deliver presents, or with the intention of ruining Christmas. He resides at his workshop at the North Pole accompanied by his wife Mrs. Claus, a team of elves led by his assistants Knecht Ruprecht and Zwarte Piet, his team of (usually nine) reindeer kept to lead his sleigh on its worldwide journey each Christmas Eve, and more rarely the demonic Krampus who punishes naughty children. Loosely based on the historic Turkish saint Nicholas of Myra, though Santa Claus as a character did not emerge until the 19th century, over a millennium after the historical Nicholas.	The Ghost of Christmas Present in A Christmas Carol; Santa Claus: The Movie; Violent Night has Santa fighting terrorists; Grampy puts on a Santa costume to cheer up the orphans in Christmas Comes But Once a Year; In the Nightmare Before Christmas, Jack Skellington tries to take over Christmas by dressing up as Santa; Santa's Slay has an evil Santa spreading mayhem, like the Robot Santa in Futurama; In The Cuphead Show!, Satan is forced to take on Santa's duties; Santa, the Easter Bunny and Jack Frost appear in Rise of the Guardians; Santa is a supporting character in Here Comes Peter Cottontail; Although Santa doesn't appear in Flight 714, the chlorophyll-rich Sani-Cola soft drink produced by Carreidas' business is named after him.
Sarcastic jerk/ Karen	An obnoxious character who has a snarky or passive aggressive response to every question. Is usually American. If female, she is often a Karen who works in customer service or as part of a homeowner association.	Father Jessup in Father Ted; Joe Bauers in Idiocracy; The Red Guy in Cow and Chicken; Genie the Weenie in Memphis Belle; Ninny's cruel aunt in Tales from Moominvalley; Taryn Manning as Karen
Scapegoat	The character made to be responsible for the ills or shortcomings in a group or the person who is held responsible for what has gone wrong and has to face justice (see the fall guy). In a family or similarly close-knit group, a "scapegoat" is another name for a "whipping boy", the person to blame for anything that goes wrong, thus allowing the favored golden child free rein.	In the Harry Potter fantasy series, Harry Potter serves as the bullied scapegoat in the Dursley family that has grudgingly adopted him.; In the TV sitcom Everybody Loves Raymond (1996–2005), the older brother Robert is the ignored scapegoat of the family, who is jealous of the attention that Ray (the Golden child) receives from their mother.; Kevin in Home Alone; The main character of Everybody Hates Chris
Scarecrow	A helpful but scatterbrained character made of straw who talks with a West Country accent and protects the farmer's crops from birds. In horror films he uses fear as a weapon.	Jon Pertwee as Worzel Gummidge; Scarecrow in Wizard of Oz; Tatty in Wizardora; Jonathan Crane in Batman; Spud in Bob the Builder; The Scarecrow of Romney Marsh
Schoolmarm	Typically, a teacher in a 19th-century Mid-West frontier town or settlement with a wholesome, virginal demeanor, modest dress, and good education – representing civilization – to distinguish her from the other Western female stereotypes, especially whores at the brothel or "dance hall girls" at the saloon (the latter is a bowdlerized version to placate censors). Young and pretty teachers are often the love interest for the hero, whereas older teachers, who tend to be spinsters, are strict disciplinarians.	Clementine Carter in the 1946 film My Darling Clementine; Miss Turlock in the 1948 short film Goodbye, Miss Turlock; Helen Crump in the 1960s US television series The Andy Griffith Show; Miss Beadle in Little House on the Prairie; In Junglies Henrietta Hippo's mum is the schoolmistress; Cat Ballou; Miss Honey in Matilda by Roald Dahl; Miss Frizzle in The Magic School Bus
Schoolmaster	The male counterpart to the above. Usually wears a bowtie and tweed cloth jacket with leather elbow patches. Can be a by-the-book disciplinarian, an inspiring and respected role model or a laid-back slacker. The gym teacher is usually a former jock who peaked in high school and still thinks he's 17.	The Bash Street Kids' Teacher in The Beano; Mr McAlistair in The Jocks and the Geordies; Rick Moranis in Gravedale High; Shaggy Rogers and Scooby in Scooby-Doo and the Ghoul School; Mr Chipping in Goodbye Mr. Chips; Geoff Baxter in Grange Hill; Filius Flitwick in Harry Potter; Coach Kleats in Archie; Johnny Rico's teacher Mr Rasczak in Starship Troopers
Scribe, news reporter and researcher	A studious character who chronicles the hero's adventures or reads through old maps and ancient documents to rediscover a lost treasure or uncover a conspiracy. Usually wears glasses. May be a youthful bookworm or an old professor. Sometimes serves as the narrator. Variants include the journalist, historian, archivist, secretary, librarian, and treasure hunter.	Milo in Disney's Atlantis; Professor Aronnax in 20,000 Leagues Under The Sea; Lois Lane; Peter Parker; Billy Batson; April O'Neil; Velma Dinkley in Scooby-Doo; Akiro in Conan the Barbarian; Marcus Brody and Henry Jones Sr. in Indiana Jones and the Last Crusade; The tech priests in Hammer and Bolter; Miss Moneypenny in James Bond; Janine Melnitz in Ghostbusters
Scotsman	A red haired miser who wears a kilt and Tam O'Shanter, wields a claymore, plays the bagpipes, and survives on porridge, haggis or oat cakes washed down with a bottle of Scotch whisky. The default personality of dwarves in fantasy literature. Is often an army officer, money lender, physician or civil engineer. Scots from Glasgow are often vicious street hoodlums or Neds who headbutt and slash each other with straight razors.	Graham McTavish as Dwalin in The Hobbit; The Scotsman in Samurai Jack; Doctor Angus Starling in The Ghost and the Darkness; David Tennant as Doctor Who; Fat Bastard in Austin Powers; Billy Connolly as King Fergus in Brave; Mark McManus as Taggart; Inspector Rebus; Para Handy and the crew of the Vital Spark; The Campbells; James Doohan as Montgomery Scott in Star Trek; Big Mac in Tugs; Angus MacFayden as Robert the Bruce
Secret agent/ G-Man	A glamorous British or American agent from the Cold War era investigating international crime syndicates and Russian spy rings. A 21st century G-man or intelligence agent may also foil terrorist plots or organized crime rings. Men usually wear a trench coat, grey suit and fedora, or a tailored tuxedo in a more formal setting. Female agents are beautiful and elegantly dressed usually in a cocktail dress, catsuit, or miniskirt. An agent who reaches retirement age or receives a dishonorable discharge usually becomes a private dick. Is often a highly skilled competent man who can pilot any boat or plane, use any weapon, and speak multiple languages.	Male agents: British agent James Bond; Matt Helm (played by Dean Martin) in The Wrecking Crew; Johnny Fedora; Austin Powers; Inspector Lee and Agent Carter in the Rush Hour (Franchise); Johnny English; Harry Palmer; Nick Carter; Alex Rider; Our Man Flint; The Man From Uncle; Ethan Hunt in Mission: Impossible 2; Spy Vs Spy; Nick Fury in Marvel Comics; Female agents: Modesty Blaise; CIA officer Evelyn Salt (played by Angelina Jolie) in Salt; Prima ballerina-turned intelligence agent Dominika Egorova (Jennifer Lawrence) in Red Sparrow
Security guard/bouncer	The uniformed security guard patrols a public building, assists visitors and keeps out troublemakers. May be a police academy dropout, retired combat veteran or a mall cop on a power trip. The nightclub bouncer wears an ill-fitting tuxedo, throws out obnoxious drunks and, if the club is a front for the mafia, they may double as an enforcer. A bodyguard is part of a VIP's security detail. If they are protecting a political leader, they are part of law enforcement. If they are protecting an organized crime leader, they may also be an enforcer.	G. W. Bailey in Mannequin; Burt Reynolds in Rent-a-Cop; Kate Dickie in Red Road; Robert Redford in Sneakers; Paul Blart: Mall Cop; Patrick Swayze in Roadhouse; Ronnie in Observe and Report
Senex amans	This stock character in medieval romances and classical comedies is an old, ugly man who is married to a pretty young woman. The senex amans, which is Latin for "ancient lover", is depicted as having wrinkles, greying hair, and struggling with impotence. He is often cuckolded by a good-looking young man who charms the young wife.	Chaucer's Miller's Tale and The Merchant's Tale; Marie de France's "Guigemar", and "Laustic", and Tristan and Iseult; In Aphra Behn's Oroonoko, the old king of Ghana is a senex amans, as he is trying to seduce the young woman Imoinda; The master tanner in Cathedral of the Sea; Archie in Tough Guys; Koschei the Deathless
Senex iratus	A father figure and comic archetype who belongs to the alazon or impostor group in theater, manifesting himself through his rages and threats, his obsessions and his gullibility.	Pantalone; Arthur Spooner; Grampa Simpson (The Simpsons); Popeye's father Poopdeck Pappy; Albert Steptoe; Red in That 70s Show; Grandpa in The Boondocks
Serial killer/ cannibal/ monster	A depraved villain who preys upon vulnerable people such as prostitutes or the homeless. May be a reclusive creep with no social skills, or a seemingly well-adjusted and ordinary-looking person. If he is the protagonist, he may be a vigilante antihero who hunts down other murderers.	Ian Holm as Jack the Ripper in From Hell; Brad Dourif as Charles Lee Ray in Child's Play; Robert Englund as Freddy Krueger in A Nightmare on Elm Street; The Night Slasher in Cobra; Monster: The Jeffrey Dahmer Story; Stuntman Mike in Death Proof; Patrick Bateman in American Psycho; Hannibal Lecter; Dexter Morgan
Sexy mother	An attractive middle-aged woman who has an open and active sex life, mostly with younger men (see: MILF or cougar). If she is a glamorous, successful woman with grey hair, she may be a silver vixen. A similar term for elderly-aged women is known as "Sexy grandma" or "GILF". A younger mother may be referred to as a Yummy mummy.	Mona Robinson; Blanche Devereaux; Sue Ann Nivens; Jeanine Stifler / Stifler's Mom, played by Jennifer Coolidge in the American Pie film series; Mamako Oosuki; Morticia Addams; Angie Dickinson in Dressed to Kill
Sexy dad	A charismatic and attractive middle-aged man, either a literal father or a father figure, who is depicted as being attractive to younger women. There is overlap with the "silver fox" stock character for characters with grey or greying hair. Sometimes also called "hot dad", this is the male counterpart of "sexy mother" — see: DILF or sugar daddy.	Jesse Katsopolis/"Uncle Jesse", played by John Stamos, from the American TV sitcom Full House; FP Jones, played by Skeet Ulrich, and Fred Andrews, played by Luke Perry, on Riverdale; Rafael Solano, played by Justin Baldoni, on Jane the Virgin; Loving dad, fitness enthusiast, and police detective Sergeant Terry Jeffords (played by Terry Crews) on Brooklyn Nine-Nine; Dr. Derek Shepherd, played by Patrick Dempsey — the character was nicknamed "McDreamy" — on the hospital drama Grey's Anatomy; John Winchester, played by Jeffrey Dean Morgan, on Supernatural
Shaman	Also known as a witch doctor, fakir or druid. May wear a mask or feathered head dress. Can be either a respected tribal elder and healer who aids the hero, or a dangerous charlatan quack doctor who partakes in human sacrifice and cannibalism. In modern times, he is often a voodoo priest or evil cult leader.	Rafiki in The Lion King; Graham Greene as Kicking Bird in Dances With Wolves; Dr. Facilier in The Princess and the Frog; Dr. Zook in Hagar the Horrible; Lady Silence in The Terror; Baron Samedi in Live and Let Die; Getafix in the Asterix comics; Cathbad, the chief druid in Slaine the King; The Fakir in Cigars of the Pharaoh
Shapeshifter/skinwalker	A person who can change into an animal, either willingly or as the result of a curse. In fairy tales he is often a handsome prince waiting for a pure maiden to break the spell. See also cat girl and werewolf.	Enid in Wednesday; Sirius Black; Beren; Eustace Scrubb in The Voyage of the Dawn Treader; Animorphs; Madame Mim in The Sword in the Stone; The Fate of the Children of Lir; Hans My Hedgehog; The prince in Beauty and the Beast; Prince Lindworm; The Frog Prince
Sheriff / Cowboy cop	The brave, skilled gunfighter who upholds the law and protects the innocent was a recurrent protagonist of Western movies. Variants include the US Marshal and Texas Ranger. A more kid-friendly version is the singing cowboy who brings order and decency to a lawless town then leaves at the end to seek further adventures. The modern equivalent in police shows and neo-Westerns is the maverick "cowboy cop", often transferred from a small-town precinct, who bends or ignores the rules to clean up the gang-infested city and exposes corruption in the police department.	John Wayne and Joel McCrea are famous for playing tough, incorruptible lawmen like John T Chance in Rio Bravo or Wyatt Earp in Wichita.; Lucky Luke; Singing cowboy lawmen include Gene Autry in Melody Ranch and Roy Rogers in Heldorado; Chuck Norris as Walker, Texas Ranger.; Clint Eastwood as Dirty Harry, although in Spaghetti Westerns his characters were usually drifters and antiheroes.; Mel Gibson as Mad Max, an ex-cop turned vigilante gunslinger in post-apocalyptic Australia.; Bruce Willis as self-proclaimed cowboy cop John McClane in the Die Hard movies.
Ship's captain or sea captain	The ship captain is typically a rugged, confident leader who is cool under pressure and who has a wide-ranging competency in maritime matters through to an obsessive, authoritarian martinet. Whether they command a wooden or iron-hulled ship or a naval vessel, they inspire respect, or in some cases fear, from their subordinates. They are often depicted with a weathered or sunburned face, a beard (or stubble), a peaked officer's hat, sweater, and a blue wool navy pea coat and they may smoke a pipe. They range from honorable, law-abiding figures who insist on strict discipline to more ambiguous characters–often with a "salty" vocabulary–such as the tramp steamer captain or smuggling vessel captain, both of whom tend to have a mysterious past and who are practiced in deception. Pirate captain, submarine captain and, in science fiction, spaceship captain, are variants.	Maritime captains: Captain Ahab obsessed in pursuit of Moby Dick, in the 1851 novel by Herman Melville, later played on film by Gregory Peck; Captain Nemo in the 1870 novel 20,000 Leagues under the Sea by Jules Verne, later played on film by James Mason; Capt. William Bligh of the HMS Bounty as depicted in the Mutiny on the Bounty films of 1916, 1935, 1962, and 1984; Captain Archibald Haddock in The Adventures of Tintin comics from the 1920s by Hergé; Capt. Horatio Pugwash in the eponymous books from 1950 by John Ryan (cartoonist) and the adapted television series; Captain Queeg, in 1951 novel The Caine Mutiny by Herman Wouk, later played on film by Humphrey Bogart; Capt. E.J. Smith of the ill-fated RMS Titanic as depicted in Jean Negulesco's 1953 film and James Cameron's 1997 film; Capt. "Lucky Jack" Aubrey in the Master and Commander 20-novel series by Patrick O'Brian; Der Alte ("the Old Man") in the 1973 novel Das Boot by Lothar-Günther Buchheim and its screen adaptations; Capt. Quint the shark-hunter in the 1975 film Jaws; Capt Marko Ramius in 1984 novel The Hunt for Red October by Tom Clancy, later played on film by Sean Connery; Spaceship captains: Spaceship captains may command capital ships of a space navy such as Dan Dare, Lorne Greene as Commander Adama of Battlestar Galactica or Zapp Branigan in Futurama.; Others may be tramp freighter spaceship skippers involved in smuggling or space piracy like Roj Blake, Captain Harlock or CJ Hawkins in Space Raiders
Shonen manga-style hero	A simple-minded yet spirited and friendly hero eager to face any challenge and prove his/her strength.	Goku; Monkey D. Luffy; Naruto Uzumaki; Ash Ketchum; Sora; Pit; Finn the Human
Shonen manga-style rival	A stoic loner who serves as a foil to the hero.	Vegeta; Sasuke Uchiha; Char Aznable; Seto Kaiba; Shadow the Hedgehog; Zuko
Shrew	A woman given to scolding and particularly nagging treatment of idolent and feckless men, with the application of occasional violence, typically of pots and pans being thrown in exasperation. Also called a harridan or virago. Further information: Virago	Katherina (Kate) Minola in the 1590s play The Taming of the Shrew by William Shakespeare and also in its 1948 musical adaptation, Kiss me Kate; Wilma Flintstone; Debra Barone; Lois Griffin; Mrs Tweedy in Chicken Run
Sheikh	The Middle Eastern equivalent to Prince Charming. If young, he is frequently the charming, handsome love interest for the white heroine. If older, he is a generous host and a wise, benevolent ruler who protects his subjects and swiftly punishes criminals and marauders. They are often depicted in flowing ankle-length robes with a checkered scarf draped over the head and secured with a cord.	Rudolph Valentino is best remembered for his lead role in The Sheikh.; Sheik Abdul Jaffar in Sahara; Omar Sharif as Sherif Ali in Lawrence of Arabia; King Ahmed in The Thief of Bagdad; Ben Kalish-Ezab in Tintin and the Black Gold
Sicilian/ Corsican/ Basque	A hot-blooded Mediterranean character similar to the Mexican Bandito. Carries a stiletto switchblade and has greasy slicked-back hair. Has longstanding feuds with his neighbours that can last for generations. Is often a brigand or part of an organised crime gang such as the mafia.	Robert Dinero in The Godfather 2; Boneywasawarriorwayayix in Asterix in Corsica; Christopher Lambert in The Sicilian; Sonny in Sicilian Vampire; The Corsican Brothers; Mateo Falcone; Mirielle in Noir
Sidekick	A loyal companion to the protagonist (or antagonist) who may also be the best friend, love interest, or partner in crime.	Jim in the 1885 book The Adventures of Huckleberry Finn by Mark Twain; Samwise Gamgee in the 1957 book The Lord of the Rings by J. R. R. Tolkien; Robin (DC Comics); Bucky Barnes in Captain America; Ron Weasley and Hermione Granger in the Harry Potter book series by J. K. Rowling; Luigi in the Super Mario video games; Tails in the Sonic the Hedgehog video games; Vinnie's friend Crazy in Hey Good Lookin'; Lucky Eddie in Hagar the Horrible; War Machine in Iron Man 2
Silver fox/Silver vixen	These are older characters, typically in their 50s or older, with grey, white, or "salt and pepper" hair who is depicted as attractive, glamorous, and charming. While they no longer have a youthful appearance, they still have sex appeal due to their confidence, sophistication, and sense of style. Silver foxes may be depicted as suave and debonair. Silver vixens may be depicted as elegant and cosmopolitan. They are often successful professionals or leaders, which adds to their appeal, including to characters who are younger than them. There is some overlap with Sexy dad and Sexy mom stock characters.	Silver foxes: In Buffy the Vampire Slayer, the mentor figure to the titular lead character, the scholar and librarian Rupert Giles was depicted as a distinguished and attractive older man; in Mad Men, Roger Sterling, the senior partner of the law firm, was depicted as witty, wise and attractive; Ulysses Everett McGill, played by George Clooney, in the 2000 film O Brother, Where Art Thou? by the Coen brothers; Dr Mark Everett Sloan and Dr Derek Shepherd (plastic surgeons) in the American television drama series Grey's Anatomy; James Bond, played by Sean Connery, in the 1983 film Never Say Never Again; Silver vixens: In the 2006 filmThe Devil Wears Prada, Meryl Streep plays the role of Miranda, a senior fashion magazine executive who is gray-haired, elegant and sophisticated; in the western TV show Dr Quinn, Medicine Woman, Dorothy attracts interest from much younger men; Zsa Zsa Gabor in Queen of Outer Space; Carrie Fisher in Cougar Club; Cate Blanchett in Elizabeth: The Golden Age; Mrs. Robinson in The Graduate
Sinnekins	Pairs of devilish, impish characters who exert their perfidious influence on the main character and are a staple of Disney animated films.	Flotsam and Jetsam in the 1989 film The Little Mermaid; Pain and Panic in the 1997 film Hercules; Thing 1 and Thing 2 in the book The Cat in the Hat; Winged monkeys in the book The Wonderful Wizard of Oz by Frank L. Baum
Sissy	In the 1930s, the "sissy" or "pansy" was a pejorative stereotype used as one of the earliest gay stock characters in Hollywood films. "Sissy" characters had an "...extremely effeminate boulevardier type sporting lipstick, rouge, a trim mustache and hairstyle, and an equally trim suit, incomplete without a boutonniere." Filmmakers used the characters to elicit a "quick laugh", and they never had any character depth. These roles "...cemented the gross stereotypes of gay men that are still seen today."	Blaine Edwards and Antoine Meriwether in Men on...; Mr Ernest in Our Betters; Lindy in the 1976 film Car Wash; Humphreys in Are You Being Served?; Gloria Beaumont in It Ain't Half Hot Mum; The campy actors Mossop and Keanrick in Blackadder 3
Skate punk/ rollerskater	The skater boy is a rebel or bad boy who wears baggy pants, a plaid shirt and Chucks or Vans. Talks like a California surfer or hippie. The girl on rollerskates may be love interest, partygoer at a 70s disco or bubblegum chewing waitress or car hop at a drive-through diner.	Marty McFly in Back to the Future; Brian in Gleaming the Cube; Derek in Street Dreams; The Lords of Dogtown; Bart Simpson; Sid in Toy Story; The cast of Starlight Express; Scott Baio in Skatetown, U.S.A.; Mickey Rooney in The Fireball; Marsha and Wendy in Happy Days; The waitress at Dex's Diner in Attack of the Clones; Jonathan E in Rollerball
Slacker	In workplace comedy and teen comedy, a lazy character who tries to do as little as possible. Is often a stoner or wisecracking hipster. Slacker characters became widely used in 1990s films to portray a type of apathetic Generation X youth who were cynical and uninterested in political or social causes. See also rebel and prankster.	Private Snafu; Ferris Bueller; Homer Simpson; Jeff Bridges as The Big Lebowski; Dave Goodman in Slackers; Dante Hicks in Clerks; Lou Dorchen in Hot Tub Time Machine
Sleazy lawyer	A staple of American drama from the early 20th century, becoming regulars in film noir, corrupt attorneys use technicalities to get obviously guilty, but wealthy and well-paying, clients acquitted. Sleazy lawyers are driven by a mixture of desiring wealth and a ruthless, competitive desire to win at all costs. They are masters at manipulating witnesses, district attorneys, and judges to ensure they win. They range from lawyers who work within the law, by gaming the system or finding loopholes, to those who break the law by destroying evidence or intimidating witnesses.	Billy Flynn in the 1926 play Chicago; Waldorf T. Flywheel, played by Groucho Marx, in the 1930s American radio sitcom series Flywheel, Shyster, and Flywheel; Lionel Hutz in the animated American television sitcom series The Simpsons; Saul Goodman, played by Bob Odenkirk in the US television drama series Breaking Bad and its spin-off Better Call Saul
Sleazy politician	An elected official who is embroiled in corruption and scandals such as taking bribes, using secret slush funds, embezzling money, or engaging in affairs with staff (or other sexual misconduct). They may be hypocrites, who speak out against crime, while using illegal drugs and hanging out in brothels.	Willie Stark in the 1946 book All the King's Men; Boss Hogg in the 1980s American television action series the Dukes of Hazzard; Francis Urquhart in the 1990s British television political drama series House of Cards trilogy; Frank Underwood in the 2010s American television political drama series House of Cards; Peter Laurence, the Justice Secretary, as played by Hugh Laurie, in the 2020 BBC television drama mini-series Roadkill by David Hare
Slow burn	A character who begins as calm and collected, but increasingly becomes more angry and exasperated as the childish antics of those around them escalate.	Squidward Tentacles; Theodore J. Mooney; Emil Sitka in the works of The Three Stooges; Frank Grimes in Homer's Enemy; Inspector Clouseau's boss Dreyfus in The Return of the Pink Panther; Captain Sternn's witness Hanover Fiste in Heavy Metal
Smoker/Drug addict	A tobacco pipe smoker is usually a gentleman detective, wizard or sailor. A cigar smoker may be a cowboy, crime boss or military officer. A cigarette smoker is often a criminal, flapper or bad boy. A character who spits chewing tobacco is usually an unsophisticated redneck or Old West gunslinger. A related character is the druggie who may smoke a cannabis joint, snort cocaine or inject heroin. Chinese villains often operate opium dens.	Gandalf and Bilbo Baggins in The Hobbit; Clint Eastwood in A Fistful of Dollars; Mongrol in ABC Warriors; Hannibal Smith in The A-Team; Rocky in Racketeer Rabbit; Cruella De Vil in 101 Dalmatians; Stanley in Doctor Stone; Dirty Steve in Young Guns; Pete in Steamboat Willie; Popeye; Davy Jones in Pirates of the Caribbean 3; Sherlock Holmes; Dr. Thackery in The Knick; Jimmy in Boardwalk Empire; The cast of Trainspotting; Tinker in Thieves of the Wood
Smuggler	A variant of the pirate archetype who uses his ship to smuggle contraband such as alcohol, gemstones, drugs or weapons. During the great depression era he is a bootlegger who transports liquor by boat or by road. A modern-day smuggler is often a truck driver who has a longstanding beef with the local redneck sheriff. In science fiction, he has a mixed spaceship crew of humans and aliens and will often conceal illegal items in secret compartments within his spaceship. An evil smuggler will use false lights to deliberately cause shipwrecks and steal the cargo.	The Scarecrow of Romney Marsh; John Trenchard in Moonfleet; Charles Laughton in Jamaica Inn; John Wayne in Reap the Wild Wind; Bandit in Smokey and the Bandit; Dagg in Starchaser: The Legend of Orin; The Outrageous Okona in Star Trek; The Bondurant Brothers in Lawless; The gang in Lackadaisy
Smurfette	A lone lead female character in an otherwise all-male cast, named after the comic character Smurfette from The Smurfs. Often portrays exaggerated feminine traits.	Elaine Benes in the 1990s American television sitcom series Seinfeld; Wonder Woman within the realm of the Justice League; Miss Piggy in the television sitcom series The Muppet Show; Beverly Marsh in the book It in Stephen King; The Chipettes in Alvin and the Chipmunks
Soubrette	A pert, clever, and coquettish female servant or lady's maid originating in commedia dell'arte and 17th- and 18th-century European comedy and opera. Street-smart and gossipy, she serves as the romantic confidante to the heroine, frequently orchestrating schemes to unite young lovers and outwit pompous masters.	Columbina in traditional commedia dell'arte; Dorine in Tartuffe (1664) by Molière; Susanna in The Marriage of Figaro (1786) by Wolfgang Amadeus Mozart; Despina in Così fan tutte (1790) by Wolfgang Amadeus Mozart
South African/Rhodesian	A farmer, big game hunter, mercenary or gold miner who goes to church every Sunday, loves grilling meat, and thrashes his kids with a belt for minor infractions such as forgetting to read the Bible. Takes great offence at being mistaken for a Dutchman. Often has a neckbeard similar to Paul Kruger and goes about armed. If he is a villain, he will have a shaved head and support apartheid and white supremacism.	Andy Serkis as Ulysses Klaue in Black Panther; Koobus Venter in District 9; The Nice South Africans in Spitting Image; Du Plessis in Wild at Heart; Mad Dog in Isidingo; Percy Fitzpatrick in Jock of the Bushveld; Safari Joe in Thundercats; Colonel Bigg in African Adventure; Zouga in Men of Men by Wilbur Smith
Southern belle	A young, upper-class woman of the Antebellum South characterized by physical beauty, genteel hospitality, flirtatious charm, and strict adherence to traditional etiquette. In classic literature and film, she often hides fierce resilience, manipulation, or tragic fragility beneath a veneer of delicate, fragile femininity.	Scarlett O'Hara and Melanie Hamilton in Gone with the Wind (1936); Blanche DuBois in A Streetcar Named Desire (1947); Shelby Eatenton-Latcherie in Steel Magnolias (1989); Rogue in X-Men media; Blanche Dubois in A Streetcar named Desire; Elsie Stoneman in The Birth of a Nation; Rogue in the Marvel Comics; Charlotte La Bouff in Disney's Princess and the Frog; Lily Olay in The Great Race
Spear carrier	A minor character who appears in several scenes, but mostly in the background roles. The term is a reference to minor characters in old plays set in Roman eras who would literally carry a spear as they played guard characters.	Imperial Royal Guards in the Star Wars film series; Commodus' praetorian guards at the arena in Gladiator; The orcs at the Battle of Helm's Deep in The Two Towers; The Roman warriors in She; Julius Caesar's legions in Caesar the Conqueror; The Russian army in War and Peace; The Zulu warriors in Zulu Dawn
Speedster	A person who can run at superhuman speeds. Is often a superhero or athlete.	Billy Whizz in The Beano; Asbestos the runner in The Twelve Tasks of Asterix; Saitama in One Punch Man; Mr Marathon in The Boys; Sonic the Hedgehog; Speedy Gonzales; Turbo; The Flash
Spinster	An older, unmarried woman past the conventional age of marriage, traditionally stereotyped as prim, prudish, gossipy, or eccentric. In comedy and melodrama, she is often depicted as a bitter, judgmental busybody or a lonely cat-lover, though in detective fiction and literature she frequently appears as a sharp-witted, observant outsider underestimated by society.	Miss Havisham in Great Expectations (1861) by Charles Dickens; Miss Marple in the crime novels of Agatha Christie; Aunt Polly in The Adventures of Tom Sawyer (1876) by Mark Twain; Bridget Jones (modern comedic reimagining) in Bridget Jones's Diary (1996)
Stakhanovite heroic worker	In socialist realism-style Soviet and Eastern Bloc films, plays, and stories, this is a happy, strong worker who works longer and harder than anyone else to exceed productivity targets. The stock character is based on the Russian coal miner Alexei Stakhanov who was praised for his mining productivity. The hero worker is indefatigable, healthy, and cheerful. They are optimistic about the future and focused on the collective good of the state. There is a female version with similar characteristics.	Yuri Krymov's 1938 novel Tanker "Derbent", and the 1941 feature film based on it, are about Stakhanovite hero workers in oil transportation.; Andrzej Wajda's film Man of Marble is about a fictional Polish Stakhanovite hero worker.; George Orwell's novel Animal Farm has a representation of the Stakhanovite hero workers in the character of Boxer the Horse, whose motto is "I will work harder!".; Harry Turtledove's novel Fallout, from the Hot War trilogy, includes a character in eastern Russia who gets into trouble with local townspeople because he works hard like a Stakhanovite.; Grigori Aleksandrov's film Tanya centered on a female character who becomes a member of the Stakhanovite worker movement.; Yuri's daughter Tanya in Doctor Zhivago
Starving artist	An impoverished painter, jazz musician, singer, screenwriter, or novelist who is so dedicated to their artistic vision, that they refuse to sell out and do commercial art (or pop music, or mainstream feature films, etc.). They live in an attic or couch surf, dress shabbily, and struggle to put food on the table. The depiction ranges from a romanticized, rose-tinted glasses portrait of libertine, absinthe-sipping bohemians to a gritty social realist examination of the artist's impoverished existence. A starving artist may also be a troubled artist.	Rodolfo, Marcello, and Musetta in the 1895 opera La bohème by Giacomo Puccini; The painter Otto and playwright Leo in the 1932 play Design for Living by Noël Coward; Joe Gillis in the 1950 film Sunset Boulevard; Jerry Mulligan as depicted in 1951 film An American in Paris; Both of the substance-abusing male leads in the eponymous 1987 film Withnail & I; Various bohemians (Satine, Christian, Nini) working as actors, artists, and writers in Moulin Rouge!; Llewyn Davis in the 2013 film Inside Llewyn Davis; Mark Cohen in the musical Rent, a reworking the opera La bohème
Strafbattalion/Convict commando/ French Foreign Legionnaire	An ex-prisoner assigned to a frontline military unit in wartime as a punishment or as a way to get recruits for a hopeless mission. In a Civil War setting ex-Confederate prisoners might become galvanized Yankees fighting the Indians, while a turn of the century setting would have a recently released criminal enlist in the French Foreign Legion. If he survives the dangerous assignment he will regain his freedom. May be an antihero if he is American or a sociopathic villain if he is German.	Telly Savalas in The Dirty Dozen; Mr. T in The A Team; Jun-Shik in My Way; Major Eazy and the Rat Pack; SAS: Rogue Heroes; Sgt. Crumb in Adventures in the Rifle Brigade; The Inglorious Bastards; Laurel and Hardy in The Flying Deuces; Beni in The Mummy; Two Flags West; Tyreen in Major Dundee; Deadshot in Suicide Squad; The Nazi paratroopers in The Eagle Has Landed; Legion of the Damned; The Germans in Come And See
Straight man	A sidekick to a funny person who makes his partner look all the more ridiculous by being completely serious – not to be confused with heterosexual man	Oliver Hardy in Laurel and Hardy films; Bud Abbott in Abbott and Costello films; Moe Howard in The Three Stooges films; Burton Guster in the American television comedy-drama series Psych; Inspector Lee played by Jackie Chan in Rush Hour; Kenneth Hutchinson in the 1975 action series Starsky and Hutch
Strong man/Brute	A large, physically powerful man who often serves as second in command or bodyguard to the villain. May be a nightclub bouncer, Bond villain, heel wrestler or career criminal. Usually has facial hair, tattoos and Russian or German accent. His good counterpart is the gentle giant.	Richard Kiel in Moonraker; Hans in You Only Live Twice; Zangiev in Street Fighter: The Movie; Polluto in Stop The Smoggies; Rock Crusher in Cops; Oxblood Oxheart in Popeye; Jimmy Reno in Road House; Uygle in Fist of the North Star; Gregor Clegane in Game of Thrones
Succubus	A demon that appears in the form of an alluring female lover. The male version of a demon-lover is an incubus. For another type of alluring, yet dangerous, female character, see Femme fatal.	Chaucer's Wife of Bath; Bo in the 2010s Canadian television drama series Lost Girl; Megan Fox's character in the 2009 film Jennifer's Body
Superhero	A noble, brave being with extraordinary powers who dedicates their life to defending the general public. Many superhero figures are a secret alter-ego personality of a "normal" person, e.g. Clark Kent/Superman, Bruce Wayne/Batman	Judge Dredd; The Mighty Heroes; Bananaman; Darkwing Duck; Marvel Avengers; Justice League; X-Men; Guardians of the Galaxy; Mighty Mouse; Dog Man; See also: List of superhero teams and groups
Superfluous man	In 19th century Russian literature, a dashing young aristocrat or landowner who is bored from his privileged life, and who distracts himself from his sense of ennui by engaging in intrigues, casual affairs, duels, gambling, and drinking. He is selfish and manipulative, and cares little about others or broader issues in society.	Eugene Onegin; Ilya Ilyich Oblomov – a young, generous nobleman who is incapable of making important decisions or actions – the title character of the 1859 novel Oblomov by Ivan Goncharov; Beltov – who destroys a poor man's happy marriage to a rich landowner's illegitimate daughter – in the 1845–46 novel Who is to Blame? by Alexander Herzen
Super soldier/Space marine	A type of heavily armed, futuristic soldier or marine who operates beyond human limits or abilities with enhanced abilities may come from extensive training, mechanical implants, or superpowers. They may use body armor, powered armor, and advanced weapons with some types of enhancements. In some stories, this soldier may operate in outer space or on extraterrestrial planets and can be deployed by orbital dropships, a science fiction version of paratroop deployment. See also: Cyborg	Juan Rico in the novel Starship Troopers by Robert Heinlein; Captain America in the eponymous Marvel Comics series; Master Chief in the Halo video game series; Bloodshot in the eponymous comic series; Universal Soldier; Doomguy; Space Marines in the Warhammer 40,000
Supervillain	The archenemy to the superhero, the supervillain is a sinister being who plots crimes against society. Their origin story, which explains why they turned evil, is important to their character.	Doctor No; Sinister Six; Monster Society of Evil; The Mandarin; Suicide Squad; Hydra; Dark Judges; See: Lists of villains
Surfer	A spaced out, marijuana-loving Californian surfer who wisecracks their way through life and uses youthful slang. Despite their lack of a job or fixed address, they have a happy-go-lucky demeanor. See also hippie.	Jeff Spicoli in the 1982 film Fast Times at Ridgemont High; Tommy Chong's characters in Cheech and Chong; Mikey in Teenage Mutant Ninja Turtles; Keanu Reeves in Point Break; Gidget in Gidget Goes Hawaiian; The bad guys in Surf Nazis Must Die; The cast of the Beach Party movies; Gill Waterman in Gravedale High
Survivalist/ prepper	A slightly unhinged character who practices self sufficiency in preparation for nuclear war, zombie apocalypse or social collapse. Wears hunting camouflage, has a shed full of illegal military grade assault weapons and may believe in conspiracy theories involving the deep state or aliens. Is often a former combat veteran with PTSD. May be the owner of a sporting goods store or a wandering vagrant.	Sly Stallone as Rambo; Eugene Tackleberry in Police Academy; John Lithgow in Distant Thunder; Reba McEntire in Tremors; Robin Williams in The Survivors; Imperator Furiosa in Mad Max 4; Shogo Kawada in Battle Royale; Cooper Howard in Fallout
Svengali/hypnotist	A manipulative villain who uses hypnotism, gaslighting or the power of suggestion to brainwash his victims into doing his bidding. May be an evil wizard, vampire, con artist, psychic, domestic abuser, or career criminal.	Gilderoy Lockhart in Harry Potter and the Chamber of Secrets; Donald Wolfit as Svengali; Dr. Caligari; The Bene Gesserit in Dune; Obi-Wan Kenobi is a rare heroic example; Jerry G. Bishop as Svengoolie; The Manchurian Candidate; The Pied Piper of Hamelin; Kaa in The Jungle Book; Charles Boyer in Gaslight; The Mad Hatter in Batman; The Demon Headmaster; Zordrak
Swashbuckler/Cavalier	An exuberant and boastful swordsman of the Renaissance or Baroque era. He is chivalrous, courageous, and skilled in sword fighting and acrobatics as he seeks prevent the stratagems of the villain. May be a French royal musketeer, English Civil War cavalier, gentleman highwayman, or Elizabethan privateer. In cinema, this character is popularly associated with the Golden Age of Piracy films.	Cyrano de Bergerac as depicted in the eponymous play by Edmond Rostand and in the many adaptations including the 1990 film starring Gérard Depardieu; D'Artagnan as depicted in the series of novels by Alexandre Dumas (père) and in the many film adaptations; Zorro in the 1920s novels by Johnston McCulley; Will Turner, played by Orlando Bloom in the 2000s film series Pirates of the Caribbean; Space Adventure Cobra; Ezio Auditore in the video game series Assassin's Creed; Walter Raleigh and Francis Drake in Elizabeth: The Golden Age; Jack Hedley as The Scarlet Blade; Edward in Children of the New Forest; Alain Delon as The Black Tulip; Swiftnick in Help! I'm a Teenage Outlaw; Errol Flynn as Captain Blood

== T ==
Character type	Description	Examples
Talking tree/ Ent	An ancient and wise plant-based organism with the ability to move independently and converse with humans. It closely resembles the trees it protects. Is usually benevolent and slow to anger, but will attack anyone who threatens its forest home.	Groot in Guardians of the Galaxy; Walt Disney's Flowers and Trees; The Singing Ringing Tree; Harold in Fallout 3; The dryads and tree spirits in Narnia; Treebeard and the Ents; Huorns such as Old Man Willow represent the untamed, dangerous forces of nature.; The grumpy trees in The Care Bears in the Land Without Feelings; In The Wizard of Oz a bad-tempered tree throws apples at Dorothy and Scarecrow.; The wood of the suicides in Dante's Inferno
Tailor/ fashionista/ supermodel	A person who works in the clothing industry, either making clothes, designing them, or modeling. In an early modern setting, the tailor has humble origins but rises in society with a combination of luck and resourcefulness. The modern fashion designer or influencer is usually British or Italian and may be a flamboyant gay man or an eccentric and egotistical perfectionist. The model may be a sweet girl next door who charms her way to the top, or a narcissistic and spiteful diva who sabotages her rivals.	Edna Mode in The Incredibles; Cruella De Vil in 101 Dalmatians; Gary Oldman in the Fifth Element; Mad Mod in Teen Titans; The Tailor of Gloucester; The Brave Little Tailor; Derek Zoolander; Miss Piggy in The Muppet Show; Ken in Barbie; Veronica Lodge in Archie Comics
Television presenter/podcaster	A charismatic, yet over-the-top celebrity who often hosts a game show, chat show or children's television. They are confident, impeccably dressed and telegenic, but tend to have inflated egos, to the point of becoming overbearing divas. A shock jock host on trash TV may have sensationalist, offensive topics to boost their ratings. A horror host may be a real vampire, ghoul or werewolf. A similar character in the 2000s is the social media influencer who has their own podcast or YouTube channel.	TV hosts: King Dice in The Cuphead Show!; Konnie Huq in Blue Peter; Mr. Rogers' Neighborhood; The Jeremy Kyle Show; The Jerry Springer Show; Social media figures: Mark Zuckerberg in The Social Network; Horror hosts: Peter Vincent in Fright Night; Maila Nurmi in The Vampira Show; The Crypt Keeper in Tales from the Crypt; Elvira, Mistress of the Dark; Margot Romero in Faces of Death; Front Man in Squid Game; Ray Stantz in Frozen Empire; Bailey in Clickbait
Terrorist	An extremist bomber, kidnapper or mass shooter who tries to raise awareness of their ideology or cause political change by committing atrocities. Is usually an anarchist, revolutionary, Irish republican, radical Islamist or white supremacist. Terrorist leader or mastermind characters may be well-educated members of a high social class (see Cultured villain).	The Evil Midnight Bomber What Bombs at Midnight in The Tick; Ryan Gaerty in Blown Away; Billy Downes in Harry's Game; Kevin O'Donnell in Patriot Games; Dylan McBride in The Ultimate Weapon; The O'Donovan brothers in The Wind that Shakes the Barley; Hans Gruber in Die Hard; Cobra Commander in GI Joe; Salameh in Munich; Achmed the Dead Terrorist
Theatre kid	A teen or young adult actor, usually a student, who openly displays a talent or passion for performance. Common traits associated with the stereotype include obsession with or devotion to school plays, the tendency to spontaneously perform or quote lyrics in everyday social situations, a personal obsession with musicals, sexual heterodoxy, and not fitting in well with the rest of society.	The casts of Glee and High School Musical; Harry Lawtey in Mr Burton; The cast of Nativity; Cuddles and Toothy in Happy Tree Friends; Schroeder in Peanuts; Sally in The Adventures of Baron Munchausen; The orphans admitted to Emma's performing arts school at the end of Moominsummer Madness; The Baudelaire children in A Series of Unfortunate Events
Thug	A henchman or gang member who commits violent crimes. In American films and television dramas, a subtype is the "black thug", which depicts African American men as "drug dealers, pimps, con-artists and other ... criminals". A criticism of this stock character is that the "disproportionate amount of black people playing criminals in Hollywood fuels the racial stereotype that black men are dangerous and drawn to illicit activities."	Bill Sikes in the 1838 novel Oliver Twist by Charles Dickens; Francis Begbie in the 1993 novel Trainspotting by Irvine Welsh; Biff Tannen in the 1980s Back to the Future film series; Ordell Robbie, the gun runner played by Samuel L. Jackson, in the 1997 film Jackie Brown; Alonzo Harris, played by Denzel Washington, in 2001 film Training Day; Most characters in the 2000s American television drama series The Wire
Tiger mom	A stereotype of East Asian mothers who relentlessly push their children to achieve success. Tiger moms set the highest standards and insist that their children strive for top marks so they can get into the best schools. In American TV and movies, this ethnic stereotype depicts East Asians as a "model minority".	Bi Sheng Nan (Tiger Mom); Ming Lee (Turning Red); Evelyn Quan Wang (Everything Everywhere All at Once)
Time keeper	A person who controls time in a multiverse and may pursue rogue time travellers seeking to change history. May have clockpunk-inspired details in his outfit such as gears or a clock face. In dystopian fiction where the minutes in a person's life are a commodity, the timekeeper also functions as executioner.	Logan in Logan's Run.; The Watchdog in The Phantom Tollbooth; The Ticktock Man; N. Tropy in Crash Bandicoot 3; Miss Minutes in Wandavision; The Time Variance Authority in Deadpool & Wolverine; Sapphire & Steel; Larry in Time Squad; Darien Lambert in Time Trax; The Valeyard in Doctor Who
Time traveller	A genius inventor with a machine designed for interdimensional travel or a magical artefact that enables them to visit other worlds. Is usually an eccentric professor or inventor with a young assistant.	Doctor Who and Susan Foreman; Rick and Morty; Doc Brown in Back to the Future; The Terminator; Mr. Peabody & Sherman; The Time Machine by H. G. Wells; Ash Williams in Evil Dead 3; Uncle Andrew in The Magician's Nephew; Martin Lawrence as the Black Knight; Gadget Boy; Bill and Ted; The Time Bandits; Leo, Don, Raph and Mikey in Teenage Mutant Ninja Turtles 3; James Bigglesworth in Biggles
Token black character	A character with no distinguishing characteristics whose sole purpose is to provide nominal diversity to the cast. In 1980s TV shows, screenwriters introduced the "African-American workplace pal" stock character as a way to add a Black character in a secondary role.	Tolkien Black (South Park); Franklin (Peanuts); Isaiah; Gerald in Hey Arnold!; Carl in The Simpsons
Tomboy	A girl or young woman who exhibits traits, clothing, and interests traditionally associated with boys, such as athleticism, roughhousing, and a rejection of conventional feminine decorum. In coming-of-age stories, she often serves as a spirited, independent rebel who either resists societal pressure to conform or undergoes a "makeover" transition into traditional womanhood.	Jo March in Little Women (1868) by Louisa May Alcott; Scout Finch in To Kill a Mockingbird (1960) by Harper Lee; George (Georgina Kirrin) in The Famous Five (1942–1963) by Enid Blyton; Arya Stark in A Song of Ice and Fire and Game of Thrones; George (The Famous Five); Mulan (Walt Disney Pictures); Mérida (Brave); Rainbow Dash in (My little Pony); Princess Daisy (Super Mario); Radical Edward in Cowboy Bebop; Peppermint Patty in Peanuts; Tomo in Tomo-Chan Is A Girl!; Fio in Porco Rosso
Tortured artist	A painter, sculptor, composer or other creator frustrated with their artistic challenges, or with being misunderstood. They may have mental health issues or addiction, and they are hard to be around due to their narcissism and frustration. In horror films, their artwork may be cursed and bring misfortune to anyone who possesses it	Brian Topp in the 1990s British television sitcom series Spaced; Vincent van Gogh, as played by Kirk Douglas, in the 1956 film Lust for Life by Vincente Minnelli; Salieri in Amadeus; Klaus Kinski as Paganini; Pickman in Weird Tales by Lovecraft; A Short Film About John Bolton
Tourist/Expat/Pilgrim	The hero's journey is a common theme in literature. The everyman protagonist may embark on a religious pilgrimage to a sacred site, leave captivity in search of a promised land or bond with his family in a road movie. Modern variants include the clueless American tourist with baggy shorts and fanny pack, the British or German holidaymakers in Spain, and the bespectacled Japanese tourist who photographs everything.	Johnny Vegas in Benidorm; The Wife of Bath in Chaucer's Canterbury Tales; Gerard in The Cloister and the Hearth; Christian in The Pilgrim's Progress; Clark Griswold in National Lampoon's Vacation; Fozzy Bear in The Muppet Movie; Big Bird in Follow That Bird; The Burnford family in Homeward Bound: The Incredible Journey; Bill Murray in Lost in Translation; Mr. Bean's Holiday; Twoflower in Discworld; Tora-San Takes A Vacation; Mitsuko and Jun in Mystery Train
Town drunk	A male in a small town who is intoxicated more often than sober. They often have a good heart and may end up helping the protagonist with advice. He can also be a street hobo. The town drunk is frequently depicted in a humorous light as comic relief, playing a harmless and lovable character whose social failings stem from their excessive consumption of alcohol. However, some portrayals can be more nuanced, exploring the social and personal costs associated with alcoholism. This character may overlap with the Wise fool.	Barney Gumble; Otis Campbell; Uncle Billy in It's a Wonderful Life; Joe Morgan in Ten Nights in a Bar-Room and What I Saw There; Lee Marvin in Cat Ballou; A drunken hobo gives Gary valuable advice at his lowest point in Team America: World Police; Winston Havelock in The Mummy; Jackie Chan as the Drunken Master
Town hero	A good-hearted person who supports their town in the face of challenges or bravely defends it from threats. In Western films he is often a sheriff.	Jack Skellington; Rudolph the Red-Nosed Reindeer; Portland Bill the lighthouse keeper; Sportacus in Lazy Town; Atticus Finch in To Kill a Mockingbird; Paul Kersey in Death Wish; Arnold Schwarzenegger as Sheriff Owens in The Last Stand
Town villain	An influential or powerful person in a town who puts their own interests, typically profit or power, above those of the townsfolk or causes trouble for their town. They are often a sleazy mayor, a corrupt cop, a greedy business leader, an antagonistic citizen, or head of a criminal gang.	Mr. Burns from The Simpsons; Sheldon J. Plankton from SpongeBob SquarePants; J. R. Ewing in Dallas; Zed in Police Academy 2; Mandark in Dexter's Laboratory; Boss Hogg in The Dukes of Hazzard; Al Swearingen in Deadwood; Brad Wesley in Road House
Tragic hero	A hero with a flaw, mistake, or misconception (hamartia) that leads to their eventual death and downfall. Historically, they were the main character in a Greek or Roman tragedy. The flaw often arises due to the character's hubris. Despite the character's flaw, the audience usually finds them to be admirable or appealing at a broader level, which increases the dramatic impact of their downfall.	Michael Corleone; Jay Gatsby; Randle McMurphy; Anthony Hopkins as Titus Andronicus in Titus; Theseus in Minotaur; Leonardo Dicaprio in Titanic; Mel Gibson in Braveheart
Tragic mulatto	A mulatto who is sad or suicidal because they fail to fit in with white or black people. The tragic mestizo has a similar clash with whites and Native Americans.	"Half Breed" — a popular 1973 song by American singer Cher; Eliza Harris, Cassy, and Emmeline (Uncle Tom's Cabin); Peola Johnson in the 1934 film Imitation of Life
Tribal/Savage	In early to mid-20th century colonialist media, the indigenous person may be represented as a fierce marauder who attacks settlements, or a foolish and superstitious heathen in need of education by a white saviour. African bushmen throw spears, live in mud huts and dance to war drums. Aborigines are friendly but lazy and may help the white settler survive the harsh climate of Australia. Pacific islanders are often cannibals with a bone through the nose and elaborate tattoos, while the chief's daughter is an exotic beauty who desires the white protagonist. When the Indian brave, Maori warrior or African chieftain is the main character, see noble savage. Modern media has largely subverted and discredited this outdated characterisation. Indigenous people are now represented as victims of imperialism and their peaceful existence in harmony with nature is contrasted with the racism and violence of the white settlers.	Injun Joe in Wagon Heels; Jack's followers in Lord of the Flies; Turok's enemy Chichak in Turok: Son of Stone; The Zulus in Zulu; Man Friday in Robinson Crusoe; Queequeg in Moby Dick; The Arumbaya Indians in Tintin and the Picaros; Billy in The Nightingale; Maimiti in Mutiny on the Bounty; Gladstone Screwer's native wife Scrubba in Carry On Again Doctor; Spotted Wolf in Soldier Blue; The friendly natives in Cannibal Adventure; David Gulpilil in Walkabout; Teddy in Crocodile Dundee 2; Molly and Daisy in Rabbit-Proof Fence
Trickster	In mythology and the study of folklore and religion, a trickster is a character in a story (god, goddess, spirit, human or anthropomorphisation) who exhibits a great degree of intellect or secret knowledge and uses it to play tricks or otherwise disobey normal rules and defy conventional behavior. Tricksters, as archetypal characters, appear in the myths of many different cultures. They are "boundary-crossers" who break physical and societal rules, "playfully disrupting normal life and then re-establishing it on a new basis." Often, this bending and breaking of rules takes the form of cunning deception and thievery. As well, there are many tricksters in folktale and mythology.	Loki in Norse mythology; Shakespeare's Puck; the Cheshire Cat from Lewis Caroll's Alice's Adventures in Wonderland; Jerry from Tom and Jerry; Bugs Bunny; Pippi Longstocking; Joker from the Batman series; Jack in Jack and the Beanstalk; Reynard the Fox and Chanticleer the Rooster in Chaucer's Canterbury Tales; Brer Rabbit in Uncle Remus; El-Ahrairah in Watership Down who is hinted by the author to be an alias of the above
Troll	In Scandinavian folklore trolls come in all shapes and sizes, from small mischievous imps to gigantic ogres as tall as the mountain. Trolls live in caves or under bridges, are drawn to the scent of Christian blood and turn to stone in sunlight. For internet trolls, see hacker.	The troll in the Three Billy Goats Gruff; The Moomins; Stone Protectors; The bag lady troll in Hellboy 2; The jotunn in Troll Hunter; The Little Troll Prince; Hugo; Kelly Osbourne and the rock trolls in Trolls World Tour; Bert, Tom and Bill Huggins in The Hobbit
Truck driver	A maverick rebel and antihero who smuggles drugs or alcohol, the modern successor to the cowboy and drifter characters from spaghetti Westerns. Often owes money to a loan shark or has a longstanding feud with a small-town sheriff. Drives a semi-truck with pictures of pin-up girls in the cab, chews tobacco, has a beard or moustache, drinks cold beer straight from the bottle or can, and wears a mesh trucker cap with cowboy boots and an oversized belt buckle. Is single by choice, but sometimes he is a divorcee or widower.	Jackie in Sorcerer; Stanley Baker in Hell Drivers; Rubber Duck in Convoy; Burt Reynolds in Smokey and the Bandit; Kurt Russell in Big Trouble in Little China; Clint Eastwood as the boxer and trucker Philo Beddoes
Tsundere	A Japanese character archetype describing someone who is initially harsh, irritable, prideful, or combative toward others—especially a romantic interest—before gradually revealing a warmer, softer, and affectionate side. The term combines tsuntsun (aloof or irritable) and deredere (lovestruck).	Asuka Langley Soryu in Neon Genesis Evangelion (1995–1996); Taiga Aisaka in Toradora! (2006–2009); Rin Tohsaka in Fate/stay night (2004); Vegeta (rival variation) in Dragon Ball Z (1989–1996); Sayaka Yumi; Tsuyukusa (Amatsuki); Rin Tohsaka; Lucy Van Pelt; Helga G. Pataki
Turks	The Ottoman Empire is remembered as a sophisticated but decadent and warlike civilisation that seeks to conquer Christendom. In media set during the early modern period, only the walled city of Vienna or the Cossack tribes of the Ukraine stand in the way of the Sultan's forces. The stereotypical Turk smokes a hookah, carries a scimitar, drinks coffee, has a big belly from eating doner kebabs and turkish delight, possesses an elaborate carpet which may or may not fly, and wears a fez, pointed slippers with curled toes, and baggy pajama pants held up with a sash.	The Sultan in The Adventures of Baron Munchausen is an artist, a poet and a composer but also enjoys watching torture and executions; The Turkish Bey in Lawrence of Arabia acts genial while beating and torturing prisoners; The brutal Turkish prison guards in Midnight Express; In The Dandy Ali Haha's dad is an incompetent Turkish policeman in pursuit of Mustapha Fag's 40 Thieves; The Calormenes of Narnia and Haradrim of Middle Earth; In Conan the Barbarian comics Yezidigerd is king of a Turkish-inspired civilisation called Turan; Bluto as Abu Hassan in Popeye the Sailor Meets Ali Baba's Forty Thieves; Abdul Abulbul Amir in the MGM cartoon of the same name
Tumblr Sexyman	A character who typically combines characteristics of the "theatre kid" and the "bad boy", developing a highly vocal following on social media as a result.	The Once-ler (The Lorax); Alastor; Robbie Rotten; Figwit in Return of the King; Kili in The Hobbit; Jack Frost (Rise of the Guardians)
Twins	Identical twins often wear the same clothes and finish each others' sentences. In science fiction these may be human clones of the original character. Siamese twins are often circus performers. See also evil twin.	Thomson and Thompson; Bill and Ben; Donald and Douglas in The Railway Series; 3 and 4 in Nine; Gary and Martin Kemp as The Krays; The two girls in The Shining; Zak and Wheezie in Dragon Tales; Two Bad in Masters of the Universe; Zaphod Beeblebrox; Daisy and Violet Hilton in Freakshow; Papa Jupiter in The Hills Have Eyes

== U ==
Character type	Description	Examples
Übermensch	A perfect – though usually, only seemingly – human being. An Übermensch rejects society's values and creates their own moral code. The German word Übermensch can be translated as "overman" or "superior humans."	Heracles, son of Zeus, in Greek mythology — called Hercules in Roman mythology; Don Pedro in the 1598 play Much Ado About Nothing by William Shakespeare; Superman in the D.C. Comics; The titular character in Odd John, a 1935 science fiction novel by British author Olaf Stapledon has supernormal human mentality which leads to conflict with normal human society and destroys his utopian colony.
Ukrainians	The Ukrainian is a bold cossack who may be a noble savage resisting the Turks, or a vicious antisemite and lackey of the Tsarist regime. Has a beard and oseledets, wears fur clothing and is a highly skilled horseman. As in real life, Ukrainians in war films are often Nazi collaborators or concentration camp guards. In modern times, Ukrainian villains are usually portrayed as gangsters or neo-Nazis	The cats in An American Tail; Maxim Trituz in Cossacks Go; Yul Brynner as Taras Bulba; The police chief in Defiance; Kubla Kraus in Jack Frost; Eroshka in The Cossacks; Alexai Turbin in The White Guard; The antagonists in Brother 2; The Ukrainian Insurgent Army in Volhynia
Underground doctor	In crime films, thrillers and war films, when a wounded mob henchman, bank robber, or resistance fighter needs medical help, they cannot go to a hospital, so they contact an underground doctor and pay cash for treatment. The underground doctor may be a moonlighting physician, disbarred MD, a dropout medical student, a veterinarian, or a former army medic and their operating room is just a room in a safe house, abandoned building or motel. Their motivation ranges from money (for those patching up criminals) to belief in a cause (for those helping rebel fighters). Some underground doctors do illegal abortions, plastic surgery to change a fugitive's appearance or, in cyberpunk or other science fiction, remove a digital implant, tracker, or explosive "leash" or add bio-upgrades. There may be some overlap with Underground lab scientist.	In Minority Report, a fugitive fleeing the police in a future society with widespread surveillance based on retinal scanners pays a backstreet surgeon to replace his eyes.; In American Mary, the titular character is a surgical student who makes money doing illegal body modification.; In Batman, Jack Napier (the future Joker) gets facial surgery from a back-alley doctor for a wound, but the unskilled treatment leaves him with a crooked mouth.; In Cloud Atlas, Ovid, a doctor working for the resistance removes clone worker Sonmi-451's explosive collar to allow her to escape.; In Dirty Dancing, Penny hires a purported doctor to do an abortion, but he turns out to be an untrained "back-alley surgeon" who injures her due to his incompetence.; In Inglorious Basterds, a film set in WW II, a wounded fighter has a bullet removed by a veterinarian who secretly works for the French Resistance.
Underground lab scientist	In crime dramas, thrillers, and science fiction, underground chemists and biologists run hidden labs where they create turn precursor chemicals into street drugs, distill high-potency moonshine, make poisons, explosives, or do unethical bioengineering. They are highly intelligent and resourceful enough to work in improvised DIY set-ups in trailers without university-tier equipment. They may be former professors or scientists who have switched to illegal work because they are blacklisted by mainstream science, running from justice or desperately need money. They may be freelancers or employees for criminal organizations.	In Breaking Bad, Walter White is a highly intelligent chemist who has become a high school science teacher. When he gets terminal cancer, he becomes desperate to make enough money to provide for his family's future, so he uses his chemistry skills to prepare and sell illegal methamphetamine.; In Ravers, a 2018 horror film, a woman goes to a rave hosted by Ozzy, a biochemist who is secretly creating illegal designer drugs in an abandoned factory.; In the Columbo episode "Publish or Perish", Eddie Kane is a mentally unwell Vietnam veteran-turned hitman who creates his own DIY explosives.; In Colony, a science fiction novel by Rob Grant, illegal bioengineering "grafters" replace clients' organs or add extra body parts for a fee.
Undertaker and grave digger	A common figure in horror films and western movies responsible for preparing the deceased for burial, making coffins and digging graves. Is tall, thin and wears black suits. May be accompanied by a crow, owl or bat.	Jebediah Morningside in Phantasm; Lurch in The Addams Family; Mr Sowerberry in Oliver Twist; The Goodbye Family; Two morticians drag away the corpse of Surly Joe's brother in the Ballad of Buster Scruggs; The Undertaker's wrestling persona
Unseen character	A character who is frequently referenced in the script of a production but never seen. In stage, film and television, they may be indirectly present through hearing their voice offscreen (such as Carlton the Doorman), or from a first-person perspective as the cameraman, answering questions addressed to them by bobbing the camera up and down to nod or left and right to say no (as with Vern in the Ernest P. Worrell series). Unseen characters may become seen near the end of a series.	Billy in the 1974 film Black Christmas; Dr. Lopez and Jay Rock from The Loud House; Elizabeth, the wife of Capt. Mainwairing, in the 1970s BBC television sitcom Dad's Army; Vera, the wife of Norm Peterson, in the 1980s→1990s US television sitcom on Cheers; Maris Crane, the wife of Niles Crane, in the 1990s US television sitcom Frasier; Mrs Wolowitz, the mother of Howard Wolowitz, in the 2000s US television sitcom The Big Bang Theory is unseen, but is very loudly heard
Upper class twit/aristocratic twit	A wealthy, pampered person from a high or aristocratic social class who is affable, good-natured, and dim-witted. While their life of privilege may have given them an expensive and extensive education – with a smattering of pretentious classical references and foreign phrases – they have been so sheltered from everyday life by their retinue of servants and advisors that they often misjudge or misunderstand everyday situations when left to their own devices.	Lord Dundreary, the brainless aristocrat from an 1858 play from where his name gave rise to two eponyms – "Dundrearies" and "Dundrearyisms".; The early 20th century wealthy young gentleman Reggie Pepper, who does not do any work, having inherited a fortune from his uncle – even though he went to Oxford, he has no ambitions and spends his days in the lounge of his private club – appears in seven short stories by P.G. Wodehouse; Bertie Wooster, the quintessential idle and affable upper class protagonist in the mid-20th century series of Jeeves and Wooster novels by P.G. Wodehouse and their adaptations. He is a member of the Drones Club gentlemen's private members' club in London, totally populated by twits: D'Arcy "Stilton" Cheesewright; Augustus "Gussie" Fink-Nottle; George "Boko" Fittleworth; Cyril "Barmy" Fotheringay Phipps; Hildebrand "Tuppy" Glossop; Richard "Bingo" Little; Archibald Mulliner; Claude Cattermole "Catsmeat" Potter-Pirbright; Alexander "Oofy" Prosser; Rupert Psmith; Reginald "Pongo" Twistleton; The twins Claude and Eustace Wooster; Female versions by Wodehouse include: Madeline Bassett; Stephanie "Stiffy" Byng; Roberta "Bobbie" Wickham

== V ==
Character type	Description	Examples
Valley girl	A teenage girl from the San Fernando Valley with a distinctive accent and emphasis on superficial traits. She is typically a materialistic upper-middle-class young woman. The term in later years became more broadly applied to any female in the United States who embodied ditziness, airheadedness, or greater interest in conspicuous consumption than intellectual or personal accomplishment.	Moon Zappa's character in the 1982 song "Valley Girl" by her father Frank Zappa; Cher Horowitz played by Alicia Silverstone in the 1995 film Clueless — a modern-day reworking of Jane Austen's novel Emma
Vamp	A seductive, glamorous, and morally ambiguous woman who uses her sexual allure to manipulate, ruin, or dominate men. Popularized during the silent film era as a more overtly predatory precursor to the modern femme fatale, the vamp is characterized by dark makeup, exotic styling, and unapologetic ambition, often meeting a tragic end to satisfy traditional moral codes.	Morticia Addams in The Addams Family cartoon series by Charles Addams; Vampira in the 1950s American television series The Vampira Show; Elvira in the American television series Elvira, Mistress of the Dark; Natasha Fatale in the 1960s animated American television sitcom series The Adventures of Rocky and Bullwinkle and Friends; Lily Munster in The Munsters; Mrs Creeply in Laff-A-Lympics; The Lady of the Green Kirtle in The Silver Chair; Morgana La Fey in Excalibur; Selina Kyle in Batman; Theda Bara in Destruction; Zita Johann as Helen/ Princess Ankhesenamun in The Mummy; The Woman in A Fool There Was (1915), portrayed by Theda Bara; Lulu in Pandora's Box (1929); Norma Desmond (aging silent-era vamp) in Sunset Boulevard (1950); Jessica Rabbit (parodic variation) in Who Framed Roger Rabbit (1988)
Vampire	Dating from Middle Eastern Semitic and Greek mythology, a vampire is a mythical creature that subsists by feeding on the vital essence — generally in the form of blood – of the living. Initially depicted as just female, from the 20th century male vampires came to dominate, typically depicted as exhibiting an aversion to sunlight, having a gaunt and pale immortal complexion, with dark swept-back hair in a widow's peak and noticeable fangs, along with a charismatic, suave elegance that makes them attractive to women. Female vampires are depicted similarly – see the "vamp" (above) — as literally very seductive femme fatales.	In mythology: The Lilim; Followers of Hekate: Empusa; Lamia; Mormo; In novels: Lord Ruthven in the 1819 novel The Vampyre by John Polidori; Varney the Vampire from 1845 in the cheap penny dreadful publications; Carmilla in the 1872 eponymous novel by Sheridan le Fanu; Count Dracula in the 1897 eponymous novel by Bram Stoker; The Vampire Chronicles of 1976→2003 novel series by Anne Rice; The Twilight 2005→2008 novel series by Stephenie Meyer; On film: Count Orlock in F. W. Murnau's 1922 German expressionist film Nosferatu; Count Dracula in popular culture, notably as portrayed by Béla Lugosi in the 1931 American film Dracula; Mamuwalde, an African count played by William Marshall in the 1972 American blaxploitation film Blacula; Miriam Blaylock, played by Catherine Deneuve, in the 1983 film The Hunger; Count Dracula in the 1992 American film Bram Stoker's Dracula by Francis Ford Coppola; Angel, played by David Boreanaz, and Spike, played by James Marsters, in the American television series Buffy the Vampire Slayer and its spin-off series Angel; Selene, the death dealer vampire, played by Kate Beckinsale, in the 2000s film series Underworld; Count Dracula, played by Claes Bang, in the 2020 BBC television mini-series Dracula by Steven Moffat and Mark Gatiss
Vecchio	This is a category of aged, male characters from Italian commedia dell'arte theatre. They are overwhelmingly the ill-tempered antagonists, opposing the blossoming romance of the young noble lovers, the innamorati. The comic ending is produced when the Zanni (servants) manage to overcome the Veccio's blocking and unite the lovers.	Pantalone, a decadent old merchant of much wealth; Il Dottore, a learned old professor or doctor; Doctor Finkelstein in The Nightmare Before Christmas; Rozzie's father in Hey Good Lookin'; Cleverdix and Majestix in Asterix and the Great Divide; King Hubert in Disney's Sleeping Beauty until he realises the peasant girl Prince Philip has fallen in love with is Princess Aurora
Ventriloquist/ puppetmaster/ Puppet	A performer with a ventriloquist dummy or puppet carved from wood or molded from plastic. The puppetmaster may be a wise father figure or a nefarious character. Sometimes the puppet gains sentience. If the puppet is benevolent, they may revel in discovering their newfound abilities. If the puppet is evil, they may go on a killing spree.	Stromboli in Pinocchio; Slappy in Goosebumps; Arnold Wesker in Batman: The Animated Series; The Dummy in The Twilight Zone; Charlie McCarthy; Howdy Doody; The evil puppets in Puppets Who Kill; The titular character in The Puppet Master
Vice	The archetypal character of Vice is an allegorical evil part in medieval morality and passion plays. This can be a representation of one of the seven cardinal or deadly sins or a more general portrayal of evil as the tempter of man. Vice often takes the audience into complicity by revealing its evil plans, often through brief asides, longer soliloquies, or monologues. Its enacting is frequently comic or absurd.	Richard III in the 1590s eponymous play by William Shakespeare; Iago — who plays up the more villainous aspects of the vice – in the 1603 play Othello by William Shakespeare; Sir John Falstaff — who plays up the more comic aspects of the vice – in the 1590s plays Henry IV, Part 1 and Henry IV, Part 2, along with the 1602 play The Merry Wives of Windsor by William Shakespeare; Philip of Burgundy in the Black Adder
Village idiot	A person known locally for ignorance or stupidity; this character often turns out to be brave and sweet, and is sometimes underestimated – see also the yokel and the wise fool stereotypes.	Bertie Wooster; Michelangelo in the animated US television sitcom series Teenage Mutant Ninja Turtles; Patrick Star in the animated US television sitcom series SpongeBob SquarePants; Ralph Wiggum in The Simpsons; Peter Hare in The Living and the Dead; David in Heartbeat
Villain	An antagonist appearing as an evil, "cruelly malicious person who is involved in or devoted to wickedness or crime. This character constitutes an important evil agency in the plot". The antonym of a villain is a hero, for whom the villain's structural purpose is to serve as the opposition of this character and their evil actions and motives behind them drive a plot along. In contrast to the hero, who is defined by feats of ingenuity and bravery in the pursuit of justice and the greater good, a villain is often defined by their acts of selfishness, evilness, arrogance, cruelty, and cunning, in displaying immoral behavior that can oppose or pervert justice — the ends justify the means. An arch-villain/arch-enemy/arch-foe is a persistent, indefatigable, and undefeatable villain — equal to or better than the hero or superhero in skill and power – who thwarts all attacks and sometimes even reappears even after being killed, (particularly in comic books). The arch-villain is sometimes referred to as arch-nemesis, but should not be confused with Nemesis. The villain can also appear as an antihero. Further information: Archenemy	Arch-villains include: Prof. Moriarty in the Sherlock Holmes book series by Arthur Conan Doyle; Megamind in the eponymous 2010 film; Omni-Man comic book character; Sabretooth comic book character; Lex Luthor; Thaddeus Bodog Sivana; Norman Osborn; See also: Lists of villains
Virgin	If female, the virgin is a pure and innocent young heroine waiting for her prince charming. She may be the object of desire for a vampire. If male, he may be a priest or monk who has taken a vow of celibacy or a socially awkward nerd or incel. Men who work dangerous jobs as bounty hunters or in law enforcement often remain single because lovers are known to betray them.	Boba Fett; Judge Dredd; Rick in The Young Ones; The 40-Year-Old Virgin; The Late Bloomer; Princess Aurora in Disney's Sleeping Beauty; Thomas Hutter's bride Ellen in Nosferatu; Molly Ringwald in Sixteen Candles; Maria the Virgin Witch
Vixen/Coquette	This woman is often a mysterious, racy, salacious, and seductive ethnic stereotype, usually French or Italian, using her sexuality to assert dominance. See also: Femme fatale, seductress and vamp.	Brigitte Bardot in And God Created Woman; Tallulah Bankhead in Lifeboat; Catherine Deneuve in Belle de Jour; Emmanuelle; Nicole Kidman in Eyes Wide Shut; Rene Russo in The Thomas Crown Affair; Maria Schneider in Last Tango in Paris

== W ==
Character type	Description	Examples
Wait staff/Busboy/Stewardess	A server in a bar or restaurant, usually French or Italian. Relies on tipping from customers because the job is low-paid. On passenger aircraft the airline stewardess performs a similar role.	John Cleese in the Mr. Creosote segment of Monty Python's Meaning of Life; Linguini in Ratatouille; John Lennon in Magical Mystery Tour; The Goofy Goober waiter in The Spongebob Squarepants Movie; Larry Semon as The Head Waiter; Julie Hagerty in Airplane!; Karen Black in Airport 1975; Stockard Channing in The Big Bus
Warlord/ Enclave ruler	A military leader who controls a region of a failed state or fallen empire that has descended into anarchy. Has a private army, often comprising mercenaries to coerce the civilian population into supplying him with provisions and fresh conscripts. May be an ambitious general who has carved out his own small kingdom, a dictator ruling an enclave or remnant of the country, or a chosen one destined to reunify the warring states and become the good king.	Elendil after the Akallabeth.; General Alcazar; Uther Pendragon; Nicholas Tse in Shaolin; Grand Admiral Thrawn in Star Wars; Jet Li in Tomb of the Dragon Emperor; Colonel Kurtz in Apocalypse Now; General Bethlehem in The Postman; Luke Evans in Dracula Untold
War veteran	Typically, a former soldier who leaves home a naïve young man, experiences the horrors of war, and then returns home embittered and deranged – suffering from post-traumatic stress disorder or other psychological problems often having flashbacks and nightmares about the war – unable to adjust to his post-war civil and daily life. This character therefore has family problems with an unhappy spouse or partner and his children due to violent emotional outbursts. This stereotype can be seen in most US action and drama films. A war veteran who stays in the army after the war or re-enlists at the outbreak of the next big conflict will usually be promoted to sergeant. A late 20th century variant is the bitter Vietnam vet, a combatant in the Vietnam War. Because of the atrocities they witnessed and disrespect on their return from domestic anti-war protesters, they are fragile and unstable. Similar cases can be seen with combatants from the Korean War and the World Wars, with the latest being from the Iraq War and Afghanistan War.	Travis Bickle, played by Robert de Niro, in the 1976 film Taxi Driver; Staff Sergeant Michael Vronsky, played by Robert De Niro, in the 1978 film The Deer Hunter; John Rambo, played by Sylvester Stallone, in the eponymous 1980s film series; Jacob "Professor" Singer, played by Tim Robbins, in the 1990 film Jacob's Ladder; Lee Marvin as Sarge in The Big Red One is a World War I veteran leading a squad of younger recruits during World War II.; Corporal Jones in Dad's Army is a veteran of the Anglo-Sudanese War, Second Boer War and WWI.; Sergeant Snorkel in Beetle Bailey fought at the Battle of Guadalcanal.
Washerwoman/seamstress/dry cleaner	A working class woman who cleans and repairs the clothes of her neighbours. Is usually Irish, Indian or Chinese. In modern times she works in a laundromat with washing machines.	In The Wind in the Willows Mr. Toad disguises himself as a washerwoman to escape from jail.; Dot Cotton in Eastenders; Mrs. Lather's Laundry; The Magdalene Sisters; Nicole in Dry Cleaning; Les Lavandières
Wealthy Southern aristocrat	A usually male character who is well-dressed, well-educated, affluent, arrogant, and haughty yet still has a healthy sense of humor. Despite his elegant demeanor, he likely holds racist and sexist views associated with Southern chivalry, and he may overly imbibe mint juleps and fine whiskey.	Rhett Butler in the 1936 novel Gone with the Wind by Margaret Mitchell; Beauregard Claghorn in the American radio comedy series The Fred Allen Show; Bill Bluff in the animated 1990s American television sitcom series Doug; Leonardo Dicaprio in Django Unchained; Stephen Lang in Gettysburg; Robert Englund in 2001 Maniacs; Johnny's father in Song of the South; The Chief Yookaroo in the Butter Battle Book by Dr Seuss
Welshman	Taffy, the stereotypical Welshman, is lazy, hard-drinking and stubborn and believes he is descended from King Arthur. At the same time, in war films, Welsh fighters can be courageous and persistent and make inspirational leaders. In comedy he works in a coal mine or farms (or is on the dole), loves cheese and pints of beer, sings in a choir, plays or watches rugby and lusts after the farmer's sheep. The Welsh have a long history of antagonism with England.	Private Owen in Zulu; A Dangerous Man: Lawrence After Arabia; Owen Glendower in The Hollow Crown; The inhabitants of Under Milk Wood; Mr. Evans in Carrie's War; Private Cheeseman in Dad's Army; Howl in Howl's Moving Castle; Stanley and Livingstone; Henry Morgan in Black Swan
Werewolf or hellhound	A monstrous, devilish canid sometimes capable of shapeshifting. The werewolf curse is transmitted by biting, like rabies.	Black Shuck; Cerberus; Fenris; Carcharoth in The Silmarillion; The Hound of the Baskervilles; Lon Chaney Jr. as The Wolfman; Dog Soldiers; An American Werewolf in London; Sirius Black and Remus Lupin in Harry Potter; Winnie in Scooby-Doo and the Ghoul School
Whaler/fisherman	An experienced sailor in oilskins and sou'wester who defies storms and rough seas to haul in his hard-earned catch. Like the white hunter who pursues man-eaters, he may have a personal vendetta against the whale or shark.	Jonah in The Beano; Quint in Jaws; Captain Chester in The Shooting Star; Honey Ryder in Doctor No; Gollum in Lord of the Rings; Captain Ahab in Moby Dick; Kirk Douglas as Ned Land in 20,000 Leagues Under the Sea; Konrad Arflane in Michael Moorcock's Ice Schooner
Wicked stepmother	A cruel, jealous, and calculating woman who mistreats, neglects, or plots against her husband's children from a previous marriage. Rooted in folklore and fairy tales, she is typically motivated by vanity, greed, or a desire to secure inheritance and status for her own biological offspring.	The Evil Queen in Snow White; Lady Tremaine in Cinderella; The Stepmother in Hansel and Gretel; Meredith Blake in The Parent Trap (1998)
Whisky priest	A priest or ordained minister who shows clear signs of moral weakness, either due to alcohol use, having a mistress, or doing other forbidden activities, while at the same time teaching a higher standard and showing courage and moral resolve on a broader level. The stock character name was coined by Graham Greene to describe the renegade priest in The Power and the Glory (1940).	"The Whiskey Priest", nameless, in the 1940 book The Power and the Glory by Graham Greene; "Preacher" Harry Powell, the criminal impersonating a priest played by Robert Mitchum, in the 1955 film The Night of the Hunter; Fr Donald Callahan in a number of horror novels by Stephen King; "The Hot Priest", nameless, played by Andrew Scott, in the BBC television sitcom series Fleabag by Phoebe Waller-Bridge; Father Jack Hackett in Father Ted; Monsignor Jefferson Wicks in Wake Up Dead Man
White friend	In American fiction centered around a group or family of blacks or other people of color, the white friend is an exaggerated parody of stereotypes of white Americans, including having awkwardness around people of color, an inability to dance, and being an all-around "square".	Chelsea Daniels in the American television sitcom series That's So Raven; Tom Willis in the American television sitcom series The Jeffersons; Zoey Howzer in the animated American television sitcom series The Proud Family; Steve Martin as The Jerk is a white orphan raised by a black family
White hunter/Explorer	Khaki-clad and pith-helmeted white big-game hunters or safari leaders in Africa, used to illustrate the Imperial mindset of the colonial era.	Allan Quatermain by H. Rider Haggard; Professor Challenger by Arthur Conan Doyle; Redvers Fenn-Cooper; Donald Duck in Mathmagic Land; Val Kilmer in The Ghost and the Darkness; Pierce Brosnan in The Deceivers; Michael Caine in Zulu; Zaroff in the Most Dangerous Game; Van Pelt in Jumanji
White savior	A western white, person – almost always a man – who saves an indigenous population from an external threat. Is often a missionary, explorer or adventurer.	T. E. Lawrence, played by Peter O'Toole, in the 1962 biographical film Lawrence of Arabia; Indiana Jones in Indiana Jones and the Temple of Doom; Jake Sully in the Avatar films; Dolph Lundgren as the Red Scorpion; Ellen Burton in White Witch Doctor; Zac in FernGully: The Last Rainforest; Sean Connery in The Man Who Would Be King
White supremacist/skinhead	Similar to the angry white man but more violent and with more extremist views. Has a shaved head, Doc Martens and swastika tattoos and may be a member of a criminal gang like the Aryan Brotherhood or Ku Klux Klan.	Pachenko in Death Race; Combo in This is England; Hando in Romper Stomper; Adolf in Surf Nazis Must Die; Derek in American History X; Homer Stokes in O Brother, Where Art Thou?; Lester Cowans in Mississippi Burning
Wimp	A mild-mannered, ineffectual, and weak-willed character, who often is easily manipulated and not well-liked. They are fearful and cautious and lack self-confidence, so they find it hard to make decisions.	Wallace Wimple; Caspar Milquetoast; Arthur Carlson; Wimp in the 1990s American television sitcom series Herman's Head; Robin in Maid Marian and Her Merry Men; Lord Percy in Blackadder; Sir Andrew Aguecheek in Twelfth Night
Wise fool	A simpleton or a person who seems like an idiot, who may speak inarticulate nonsense in one moment, only to later show wisdom. The fool's mocking humour shows his ability to understand events or speak blunt truths to a leader.	Puck in the play A Midsummer Night's Dream by William Shakespeare; Goofy in various animated Disney films; Chauncey "Chance the gardener" Gardiner, played by Peter Sellers, in the 1979 film Being There, based on the 1971 novel by Jerzy Kosiński; Forrest Gump, played by Tom Hanks, the eponymous lead in the 1994 film, based on the 1986 novel by Winston Groom; Pumbaa in The Lion King film series; Wheelie in Transformers: The Movie
Wise old man/Wizard	An elderly, kind and wise person who serves as mentor to the protagonist. They may be a profound philosopher distinguished for their wisdom and sound judgment. They use their extensive learning and worldly experience to help tell stories and offer guidance in a mystical way to give the protagonist a sense of who they are and who they might become. They may seem absent-minded due to a predilection for solitary contemplation. They may be a cloistered hermit who is hard to find. Old men may serve as a father figure to the protagonist. In fantasy, he may also be a wizard. For the female equivalent, see Enchantress	Merlin in the Arthurian legends; Whitestorm in the Warriors (novel series); Gandalf in the books The Hobbit and The Lord of the Rings by J. R. R. Tolkien; Ged a.k.a. Sparrowhawk the Mage in The Earthsea Cycle book series by Ursula K. le Guin — especially the latter novels; Obi-Wan Kenobi and Yoda in the Star Wars film series; Albus Dumbledore in the Harry Potter book series by J. K. Rowling; Gilliam in Jayce and the Wheeled Warriors; Jaga in Thundercats
Witch	A user of magic, usually a woman, who can appear as neither wholly benevolent nor malevolent. Often depicted as wizened, withered old hag – sometimes a fairy or deity — occasionally benevolent of cruel, malicious, malevolent nature, though can also be mysterious and alluring young woman or could take any appearance with shapeshifting magic, but sometimes chooses the appearance of such an old woman in the first instance of meeting. The character is found extensively throughout mythology, folklore, and children's tales, often in groups or covens of three. The ancient magical triumvirate of the maiden, mother, and crone is linked directly to the key stages of women's lives and their development of their roles in society. The words witch and hag can also be used synonymously. Further information: crone, hag, and fairy godmother	In Greek mythology: Circe, the daughter of the sun god Helios and the Oceanid Perse, of the enchantress the isle of Aeaea in the Odyssey by Homer; Calypso, the water nymph enchantress of isle of Ogygia, in the Odyssey by Homer; Stygian Witches as depicted in the 1981 film Clash of the Titans; The Morrígan or Badb in Celtic mythology and Irish folklore; Baba Yaga in Slavic and Russian folklore; The Three Witches who give the prophecy to the Lords Banquo and Macbeth in the 1606 play by William Shakespeare.; Maleficent in Sleeping Beauty by Charles Perrault and the Disney adaptations; The Evil Queen in Snow White and the Seven Dwarfs by the Brothers Grimm; The old woman in the woods in the fairy tale Hansel and Gretel by the Brothers Grimm; Wicked Witch of the West in The Wonderful Wizard of Oz by Frank L. Baum; In the Discworld series by Terry Pratchett, there are a great many, but notably: Granny Weatherwax (crone); Nanny Ogg (mother); Magrat Garlick (maiden); Tiffany Aching; In the Harry Potter and Fantastic Beasts series by J.K. Rowling, there are a great many, but notably: Hermione Granger; Professor McGonagall; Molly Weasley; Bellatrix Lestrange; Dolores Umbridge; The sisters Tina and Queenie Goldstein, played by Katherine Waterston and Alison Sudol; Yubaba and her twin sister Zeniba in the 2001 Studio Ghibli animated fantasy film Spirited Away written and directed by Hayao Miyazaki; See also: List of fictional witches

== Y ==
Character type	Description	Examples
Yandere	A character archetype in anime, manga, and visual novels who initially appears sweet, gentle, and deeply devoted to a romantic interest, but whose affection escalates into obsessive, possessive, and violent psychosis. The term blends yanderu (to be mentally ill) and deredere (lovestruck).	Yuno Gasai in Future Diary (2006–2010); Kotonoha Katsura and Sekai Saionji in School Days (2005); Yukako Yamagishi in Diamond Is Unbreakable (1992–1995); Satō Matsuzaka in Happy Sugar Life (2015–2019)
Yokel, peasant or hillbilly	An unsophisticated country person whose rural accent, lack of formal education, and coarse manners are used for comic relief — see also "village idiot". Often talks with a West Country or Appalachian accent, plays the banjo, wears dungarees and wellington boots, has missing teeth, and smokes a corncob pipe.	Cletus Spuckler in the animated American television sitcom series The Simpsons; Dale Gribble in the animated American television sitcom series King of the Hill; The villagers in Straw Dogs; Trevor Philips; Pvt. Zero in Beetle Bailey; The Beverley Hillbillies; Joe Dirt; Jim Varney as Ernest P. Worrell; The farmers in Inbred; The Three Bears in the Beano; Piers Plowman; Hugo in Heirs to the Land
Youngest child	The underestimated youngest child in a family of many children, usually all of the same gender. Often portrayed as the most childlike of the children due to their youth; though, in a plot twist, this character may be portrayed as comically sinister. In a continuing live-action series, they may be effectively succeeded by the even younger "Cousin Oliver".	Maggie Simpson in the animated American television sitcom series The Simpsons; Bobut in the 1990s American television sitcom series Aliens in the Family; Stewie Griffin in the animated American television sitcom series Family Guy; Kevin in Home Alone; Pubert in The Addams Family; Junior Angel in Judge Dredd
Youxia	They are type of ancient Chinese warrior folk hero who defend the weak, celebrated in classical Chinese poetry and fictional literature. Most often depicted in wuxia films as swash-buckling wandering adventurers or knight-errants of China going back to the end Warring States period and the foundation of the Qin dynasty of the 3rd century BCE through to period of the Ming→Qing dynasties transition in the 17th century. See also Ronin.	The 12th-century Northern Song dynasty heroes of folk tales of The Water Margin of the mid-14th century adapted into a 1973 Japanese television series The Water Margin; Fong Sai-yuk; Jimmy Wang-Yu as the One Armed Boxer; Zu Warriors of Magic Mountain; Mulan; Jet Li as Huo Yuanjia in Fearless; David Carradine as Caine in Kung Fu
Yuppie	A young, urban professional of the 1980s and early 1990s – typically an advertising executive, corporate businessperson, investment banker, stock broker, corporate lawyer, or similar – who is driven by their goals of achieving wealth, career success, and the status symbols that come with these, to the exclusion of all else. They have a love of materialism and exclusivity associated with success in a free-market economy of the neo-liberal politics driven by the Ronald Reagan and Margaret Thatcher governments. They measure their lives by their luxury car (a BMW or Saab), their house in a trendy downtown neighborhood, dressing in designer clothes, and eating at exclusive restaurants. They have no time for any family life. Usually, they are depicted as immoral and villainous profiteers or for satirical purposes, may be benign swept up in forces beyond their control.	J.C. Wiatt, played by Diane Keaton, in the 1987 film Baby Boom; Gordon Gekko and Bud Fox, played by Michael Douglas and Charlie Sheen, in the 1987 film Wall Street co-written and directed by Oliver Stone; Denis Dimbleby Bagley and Julia Bagley, played by Richard E. Grant and Rachel Ward, in the 1989 satire film How to get ahead in advertising written and directed by Bruce Robinson; Wall Street investment banker Patrick Bateman in the 1991 book American Psycho by Bret Easton Ellis; Jordan Belfort, played Leonardo DiCaprio, in the 2013 film The Wolf of Wall Street

== Z ==
Character type	Description	Examples
Zanni	Servant characters in commedia dell'arte. Zanni were of two distinct types: one is an astute, cunning servant and the other is a silly, stupid servant. They were called First Zanni and Second Zanni. Mezzetino and Brighella are examples of the First Zanni; Arlecchino and Pulcinella are examples of the Second Zanni. The Second Zanni provides comic relief. The Zanni also help the young lovers to overcome the blocking efforts of the Veccio, or elderly male characters.	Arlecchino (or Harlequin), Brighella, and Pulcinello; Mr. Punch from the Punch and Judy shows is an anglicised version of Pulcinello; Papageno, the flute-playing, bird-charming baritone servant of the Prince Tamino, in the 1791 opera Die Zauberflöte/The Magic Flute by Emanuel Schikaneder and W. A. Mozart; In Thumbelina the creepy incel toad wears a clown costume and his two brothers are dressed as Harlequin and El Capitan
Zombie	A type of undead creature that appears across various media, typically appearing as a mindless destructive horde. It is a mythological undead corporeal revenant created through the reanimation of a corpse. The term comes from Haitian folklore, in which a zombie is a dead body reanimated through various methods, most commonly magical practices in religions like Vodou. Variants include the mummy, ghoul, wendigo, lich, and skeleton. In modern popular culture, zombies are most commonly found in horror and fantasy genre works. Modern media depictions of the reanimation of the dead often do not involve magic but rather science fictional methods such as carriers, fungi, radiation, mental diseases, vectors, pathogens, parasites, scientific accidents, etc.	The zombie first-person narrating character known only as "R" in the 2010 book Warm Bodies by Isaac Marion; Necromorph; Simon William Garth; Solomon Grundy; Emily in the Corpse Bride; The Ghoul in Fallout; Magical zombies include the Deadites in Evil Dead, the Lich in Adventure Time, Nightmare Creatures, and the monsters in House of the Dead.; Some of the best-known undead mummies are Lot No. 249, Akhmenrah in Night at the Museum, Boris Karloff as Ardeth Bay in The Mummy, and Arnold Vosloo as Imhotep in the remake.; Science fiction zombies are the antagonists of Dead Rising, Land of the Dead, 28 Days Later, and Resident Evil.; Cowboy zombies are the villains in Weird West media like Death Valley: The Revenge of Bloody Bill, Ghost Town, Darkwatch and Red Dead Redemption: Undead Nightmare.; Nazi zombies appear in Dead Snow and Zombie Lake.; Undead skeletons include the Barrow wights in The Fellowship of the Ring, Big and Little Skeleton in Funnybones, Hector Barbossa in The Curse of the Black Pearl, and Texas Pete's henchman in Superted
Zoo keeper/ veterinarian/ naturalist	The keeper looks after the animals in a zoo, teaches them tricks and educates the visitors. Zookeepers are typically kind-hearted and caring, but less commonly, they may be abusive tyrants. Veterinarians are depicted as being dedicated to caring for animals and they may rescue stray or unwanted animals. In adventure fiction he may go on safari to capture exotic wild beasts in Africa or India.	Frank DeTorre (played by Bill Murray) is a depressed zookeeper who is struggling with overeating and poor hygiene in Osmosis Jones; Hal and Roger Hunt in Adventure series capture wild animals in the Amazon and in Africa to bring them back to a zoo; Doctor John Dolittle is the central character of a series of children's books by Hugh Lofting starting with the 1920 The Story of Doctor Dolittle. He is a physician who shuns human patients in favour of animals, with whom he can speak in their own languages. He later becomes a naturalist, speaking with animals to better understand nature and the history of the world. He eventually gets a collection of animals, as described in Doctor Dolittle's Zoo.; Peevily in Help! It's the Hair Bear Bunch!; Malakili in Star Wars; Damien in Animal Park; Gorman in Murders in the Zoo; John Wayne in Hatari!; Jessica Chastain The Zookeeper's Wife; Kevin James in Zookeeper; Jessica Alba in Good Luck Chuck

== Sources and further reading ==
- Silver, Alain; Ursini, James (1997). The Vampire Film: From Nosferatu to Interview with the Vampire. New York City: Limelight Editions. pp. 22–23. ISBN 978-0-87910-395-8.
- Loukides, Paul and Fuller, Linda K. Beyond the Stars: Stock characters in American popular film. Volume 1. Popular Press, 1990.
