= The Old Rep =

Theatre in Birmingham, England

- formerly The Birmingham Repertory Theatre
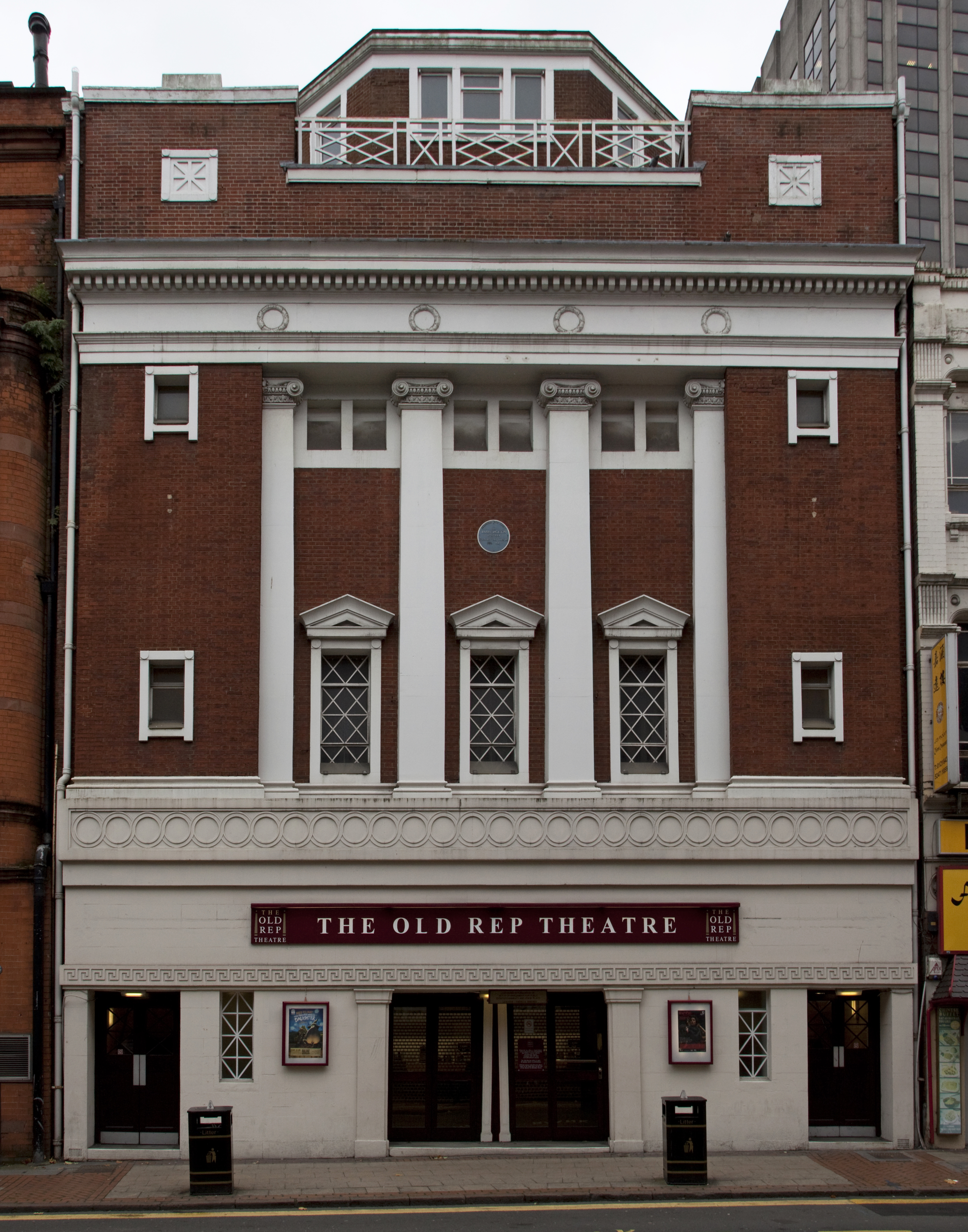
- The Façade of The Old Rep as seen from Station Street
- Interactive map of The Old Rep
- Address: Station Street; Birmingham, B5 4DY; England
- Coordinates: 52.47678°N 1.89828°W
- Owner: The Crescent Theatre
- Capacity: 385 (including 2 wheelchair spaces)
- Type: Proscenium arch
- Designation: Grade II listed
- Public transit: Birmingham New Street

Construction
- Opened: 15 February 1913; 113 years ago
- Years active: 1913–present
- Architect: S. N. Cooke

Website
- oldreptheatre.co.uk

Listed Building – Grade II

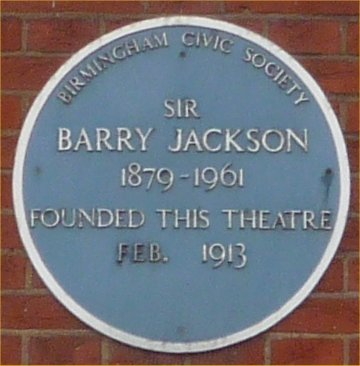
Blue plaque to founder, Barry Jackson, above the entrance

The Old Rep is a historic Grade II listed theatre, located on Station Street in Birmingham, England. Upon opening in 1913, as the Birmingham Repertory Theatre, it became the United Kingdom's first purpose-built repertory theatre and the permanent home for Barry Jackson's Birmingham Repertory Company, which had been officially established in 1911, having evolved from his amateur theatre group ‘The Pilgrim Players’, which had been founded in 1907. A man of considerable means, Jackson funded the entire construction of the theatre and established his professional, resident company there, which soon became a major powerhouse within the British theatre due to the actors it produced and its innovative stagings of the works of both Shakespeare and George Bernard Shaw, resulting in some considering it to be Birmingham’s answer to The Old Vic.

In its heyday the theatre became a launchpad for young actors wishing to gain experience in the theatre and to hone their craft through the then thriving repertory system. Such luminaries included: Laurence Olivier, Ralph Richardson, Peggy Ashcroft, Edith Evans and later Paul Scofield, Albert Finney, Derek Jacobi and the director Peter Brook.

In June 2024, it was officially announced that The Crescent Theatre, which celebrated its centenary in the same year, would be taking over the running of the historic theatre in August 2024, alongside its own theatre complex in Brindley Place.

The theatre is situated just opposite New Street Station, from which a Birmingham Civic Society blue plaque dedicated to Sir Barry Jackson can be seen. For a relatively small street consisting of 9 buildings, Station Street also houses additional buildings of historic importance including, Britain's oldest working cinema; The Electric, The Crown Public House, which was given Grade II listed status in March 2024 and the former Market Hotel which was also given Grade II listing in November 2024, bringing the total number of listed buildings to 3.

== Origins ==
In September 1912, Jackson purchased a small plot of land in Station Street in-between the Market Hotel (built in 1883) and C.F. Marlow Wine Merchants. The street was then a major artery in the city, with the street leading straight to the Market Hall and access to New Street Station opposite. He employed the architect S. N. Cooke, a colleague from the Birmingham School of Art, who collaborated with Barry Jackson in the creation of the theatre. Both Jackson and Cooke took inspiration from the democratic nature of theatres that they had visited in Germany. The design of the theatre was particularly influenced by Max Littmann's Münchner Künstlertheater which had been built in 1908. In March 1914, a set building and painting workshop was built in the neighbouring Hinckley Street, which is still connected to the theatre at the back.

Construction on the vacant site began in October 1912 by Birmingham based builders John Bowen and Sons, funded entirely by Jackson. Wanting the theatre built as soon as possible, he paid for continuous work by day and under flares into the winter nights, to have the theatre built within four months. To this day, the theatre retains many of the Edwardian features both externally and internally, making it one of the best preserved theatres of its type, still in use for its original purpose.

The theatre opened its doors on 15 February 1913 with a performance of William Shakespeare's Twelfth Night, preceded by a reading from Barry Jackson, of the poem The Mighty Line by resident playwright John Drinkwater. The company began what would become more than a century of history with a vision led by Jackson that theatre should "serve as art instead of making that art serve a commercial purpose." With a wealth of local talent, the theatre produced a rolling bill of plays reflecting both classic texts and new writing.

== Home of the Birmingham Repertory Company: 1913-1971 ==
The theatre rapidly became home to one of the most famous repertory theatre companies in the country with the repertoire ranging from innovative modern dress Shakespeare, medieval moralities, Greek drama and modern experimental drama, as well as presenting many world premieres including George Bernard Shaw's epic Back to Methuselah in 1923.

In 1914, almost a year after opening, The First World War began, with the theatre becoming a refuge for people during those dark days. In 1915, the men who were unable to join the war effort, who worked for the theatre both on stage and off, worked together on Sundays making shells at the local aluminium works.

In 1917, the Birmingham Repertory Company became a pioneer in the theatre industry by becoming the first UK venue to appoint a female stage manager, Maud Gill. She left a fascinating and entertaining account of her experiences in her autobiography 'See the Players'. She was told that "a woman ought not to be put in charge of stagehands because "working men" would not take orders from her, but she decided that, since mothers has been keeping order in the home since the beginning of time, the way to go about it was to treat them as a mother would treat her family. It worked."

In 1921, a fire erupted inside the theatre damaging the front curtain and the stage set. However, by the matinee the following day, the production continued despite the fire damage.

In 1923, Barry Jackson received a gold medal from the Birmingham Civic Society which was shortly followed by a knighthood in 1925 for his services to the theatre. Sir Barry Jackson's significant role in the Birmingham's arts scene was to be recognized once again in 1955 when he was awarded the Freedom of the City.

Jackson single-handedly financed the theatre for over two decades, personally losing over £100,000. The scale of Jackson's financial commitment to The Rep was revealed by the recollections of George Bernard Shaw of his first meeting with Jackson in 1923:

'How much a year are you out of pocket by this culture theatre of yours?' I said. He named an annual sum that would have sufficed to support fifty labourers and their families. I remarked that this was not more than it would cost him to keep a thousand-ton steam yacht. He said a theatre was better fun than a steam yacht, but said it in the tone of a man who could afford a steam yacht.

— George Bernard Shaw

Jackson threatened to close the theatre at the end of the 1923–24 season after audiences at a production of Georg Kaiser's Gas in November 1923 averaged only 109 per night, but relented after commitments were made by 4,000 subscribers for the following season. A fundraising appeal in 1934 raised only £3,000 of its £20,000 target, however, leading Jackson to hand over ownership to a board of trustees in January 1935. Although this relieved Jackson of financial responsibility for the company, he would retain full artistic control until his death in 1961.

In 1932, Jackson appointed Herbert M. Prentice as producer at the theatre. Prentice produced and directed over 900 plays before leaving in 1940, as well as writing scripts for some. Some of these were broadcast on BBC radio, and a few by the early BBC television service.

By the outbreak of the Second World War the Rep was, alongside the Liverpool Playhouse, one of only two British theatres presenting programmes of quality drama outside London in accordance with the original aims of the repertory movement. An indication of the Rep's status in British theatre at this time was given by the Scottish playwright James Bridie, who wrote in 1938: "If we are to be bombed, a thorough razing from Piccadilly Circus to Drury Lane and down to The Strand would do less harm to the theatre than one bomb on Station Street, Birmingham."

In 1940, during the Birmingham Blitz, a bomb was dropped through the theatre’s roof, which resulted in the destruction of nearly 30 years of set and costumes. Despite this, the company vowed not to be affected, with the management deciding to switch performances to matinees only, which resulted in an increase in audiences as they now felt safer.

Jackson had an exceptional eye for young talent, and it was under his leadership that many young actors learnt their craft and who later went on to become stars in their own right. Some of the early names included; Laurence Olivier, Peggy Ashcroft, Edith Evans, Stewart Granger and Ralph Richardson all gaining valuable early experience with the then thriving repertory system. He toured plays to the city's parks, established a theatre school and made Birmingham Repertory Theatre one of the most renowned theatres in the world. As the theatre's reputation grew, more talent was to develop on its stage with the likes of Paul Scofield, Julie Christie, John Neville, Albert Finney and Derek Jacobi. Peter Brook directed at the Rep just after World War II and transferred with Sir Barry and Paul Scofield to Stratford.

The theatre was awarded its first Arts Council England grant in 1954 worth £3,000 which now equates to £77,000. Shortly after in 1960, Barry Jackson met with Birmingham City Council and Arts Council England to guarantee the funding to build a new arts venue. This was eventually agreed in 1968, and plans for the new Rep began to take place.

== Life after the Birmingham Repertory Company: 1971-2026 ==
In 1971, after 58 years, the resident company of the Birmingham Rep moved to a newly built 901-seat theatre designed by Graham Winteringham and Keith Williams Architects on Broad Street, with them taking the name of Birmingham Repertory Theatre with them. Consequently, the theatre was renamed The Old Rep, to avoid confusion, when it was taken into full ownership by Birmingham City Council. However, this wasn't the last time the company would be based at Station Street, returning to The Old Rep between 2011 and 2013 while the Birmingham Repertory Theatre and the Library of Birmingham underwent redevelopment. The company celebrated their centenary year at their original home with a programme of performances, tours and creative activities for the people of Birmingham.

The Birmingham Theatre School, established by Sir Barry Jackson and also known later as The Old Rep Drama School was based at The Old Rep; it was run by Mary Richards from her appointment by Jackson in 1942.

For a period in the early 1990s it became the base of The Birmingham Stage Company, with the City Council still hiring out the theatre to touring shows and productions.

In 2014, Birmingham Ormiston Academy (BOA), a Birmingham based stage school, took on the lease of the theatre from the City Council. In 2024, after 10 years, they decided not to renew the lease, which allowed the established Crescent Theatre to take ownership of the theatre and secure it for future generations.

The theatre was specifically chosen by the producers of the BAFTA nominated biopic Stan & Ollie due to the theatre's unspoiled period interior, which was deemed ideal for the scenes in which Stan Laurel and Oliver Hardy's 1953 tour of music hall theatres in the UK were recreated. Filming took place over the course of several days in 2017, with actors Steve Coogan and John C. Reilly and the production team using the theatre's stage and dressing rooms.

Current Patrons of The Old Rep include Brian Cox, Brian Blessed, Annette Badland and Toyah Willcox.

== Notable Performers ==
The Old Rep has played a central role in the early careers of many of the UK's most celebrated actors and theatre-makers. A few notable names who have all performed at The Old Rep include:

- Laurence Olivier
  - Joined the company for a year from 1927 to 1928. He performed as Tony Lumpkin in She Stoops to Conquer, Malcolm in William Shakespeare's Macbeth and also appeared in The Taming of the Shrew and Uncle Vanya. In 1947 he was also the youngest actor to be Knighted.
- Paul Scofield
  - Performed in Shakespeare's Hamlet in 1942, as part of the Rep Travelling Company. Whilst performing as Toad in Toad of Toad Hall (1944). He met Peter Brook and they went on to have a lifelong collaboration. In a 2004 Royal Shakespeare Company poll stated that his performance in William Shakespeare's King Lear was the best ever.
- Peter Brook
  - Made his directing debut at The Old Rep in 1945 directing Man and Superman written by George Bernard Shaw.
- Michael Gambon
  - Spent three years with the Royal National Theatre at The Old Vic. He was advised by Laurence Olivier to join the Birmingham Repertory Company to gain more experience in performing. He went on to star alongside Brian Cox (actor) in Othello in 1968.
- Gwen Ffrangcon-Davies
  - Took a lead role, alongside Ion Swinley, as Juliet in William Shakespeare's Romeo and Juliet.
- Noël Coward
  - Transferred from the West End to the theatre in 1920, when he played Rafe in a production of ‘The Knight of the Burning Pestle’.
- Robert Newton
  - Joined the Birmingham Rep Company in February 1921, aged 15, as an ASM. By March, 1921, he was on stage in Captain Brassbound's Conversion by George Bernard Shaw. He was at the Rep for two years until February 2023, during which time he appeared in 25 productions, some alongside Gwen Ffrangcon-Davies and Cedric Hardwicke who were both in the company at that time.
- Jane Freeman (actress)
  - She had performed numerous roles at the Repertory Theatre. She went on to play a part on BBC's Last of the Summer Wine as Ivy.
- Peggy Ashcroft
  - Joined the Rep straight from drama school. She starred alongside Laurence Olivier in John Drinkwater (playwright)'s Bird in Hand in 1927.
- John Neville
  - Joined the Rep for 3 seasons from February 1949 to March 1950, his final part was as John Worthing in The Importance of Being Earnest opposite Peter Vaughn's Algernon.
- Derek Jacobi
  - Had a starring role as Henry VII in William Shakespeare's Henry VIII (play).
- Brian Cox (actor)
  - Starred in William Shakespeare's Othello in 1968, alongside Michael Gambon. Cox is now also a patron of The Old Rep.
- Edith Evans
  - She appeared as The Oracle in Part VI of George Bernard Shaw's Man and Superman in 1945.
- Ralph Richardson
  - Played Traino in a 1928 production of The Taming of the Shrew. His three-year stint also included performances of The Importance of Being Earnest, The Farmer's Wife and Dear Brutus.
- Albert Finney
  - Starred alongside actress June Brown in William Shakespeare's Macbeth in 1958.
- June Brown
  - Starred as Lady Macbeth in Macbeth in 1958, alongside actor Albert Finney who played the lead role.
- John Gielgud
  - Took a lead role in William Shakespeare's tragedy Romeo and Juliet in 1924.
- Richard Chamberlain
  - Took a lead role in William Shakespeare's tragedy Hamlet in 1969.
- Julie Christie
  - Appeared in the Christmas Revue Between These Four Walls in 1963.
- Toyah Willcox
  - Attended The Old Rep's drama school in her late-teens and participated in many of their shows including Separate Tables and charity fashion shows at Warwick Castle. Willcox is now a patron of The Old Rep.

== Notable Buildings in Station Street ==
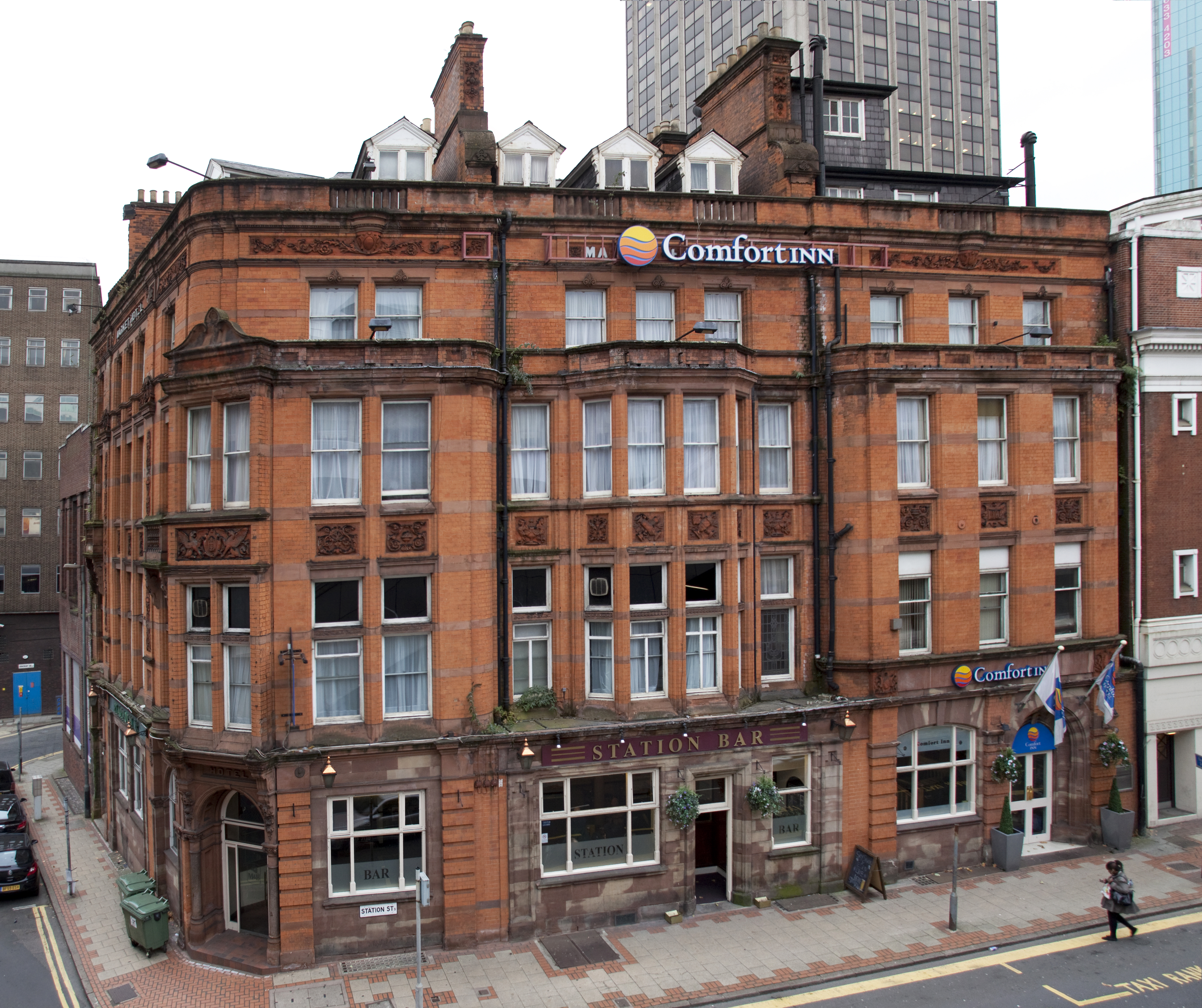
Former Market Hotel (to the left of the Old Rep). Built in sandstone in 1883 by Thomson Plevins. At the back of the hotel the original workshop of the Old Rep can just be seen. The building became Grade II Listed in November 2024.

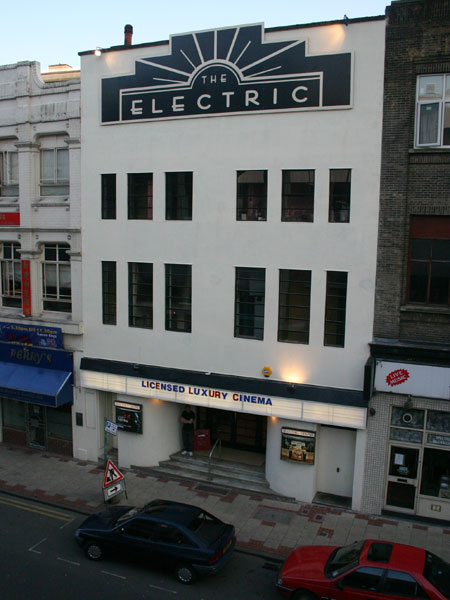
The Electric Cinema. An application for Listed status is currently being considered.

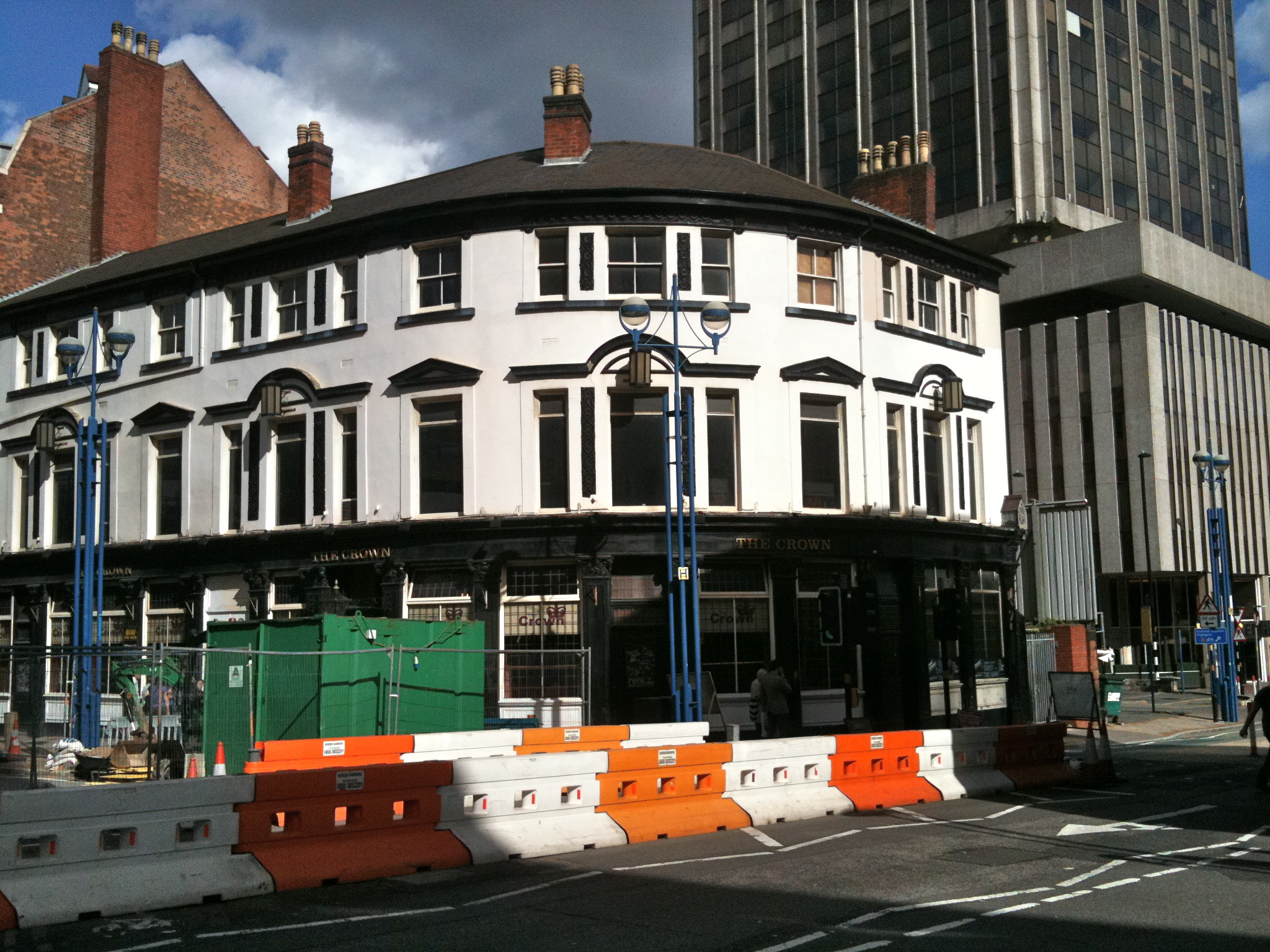
The Crown Public House, also attributed to Plevins, which gained Grade II Listed status in March 2024.

== Sources ==
- Conolly, Leonard W. (2002). "Introduction". In Conolly, Leonard W. (ed.). Bernard Shaw and Barry Jackson. Selected Correspondence of Bernard Shaw. Toronto: University of Toronto Press. pp. xi–xxxvi. ISBN 0802035728.
- Turnbull, Olivia (2008). Bringing Down the House: The Crisis in Britain's Regional Theatres. Bristol: Intellect Books. ISBN 978-1841502083.
