= Birmingham Repertory Theatre =

Theatre in England

Birmingham Rep
- Birmingham Rep; The Rep
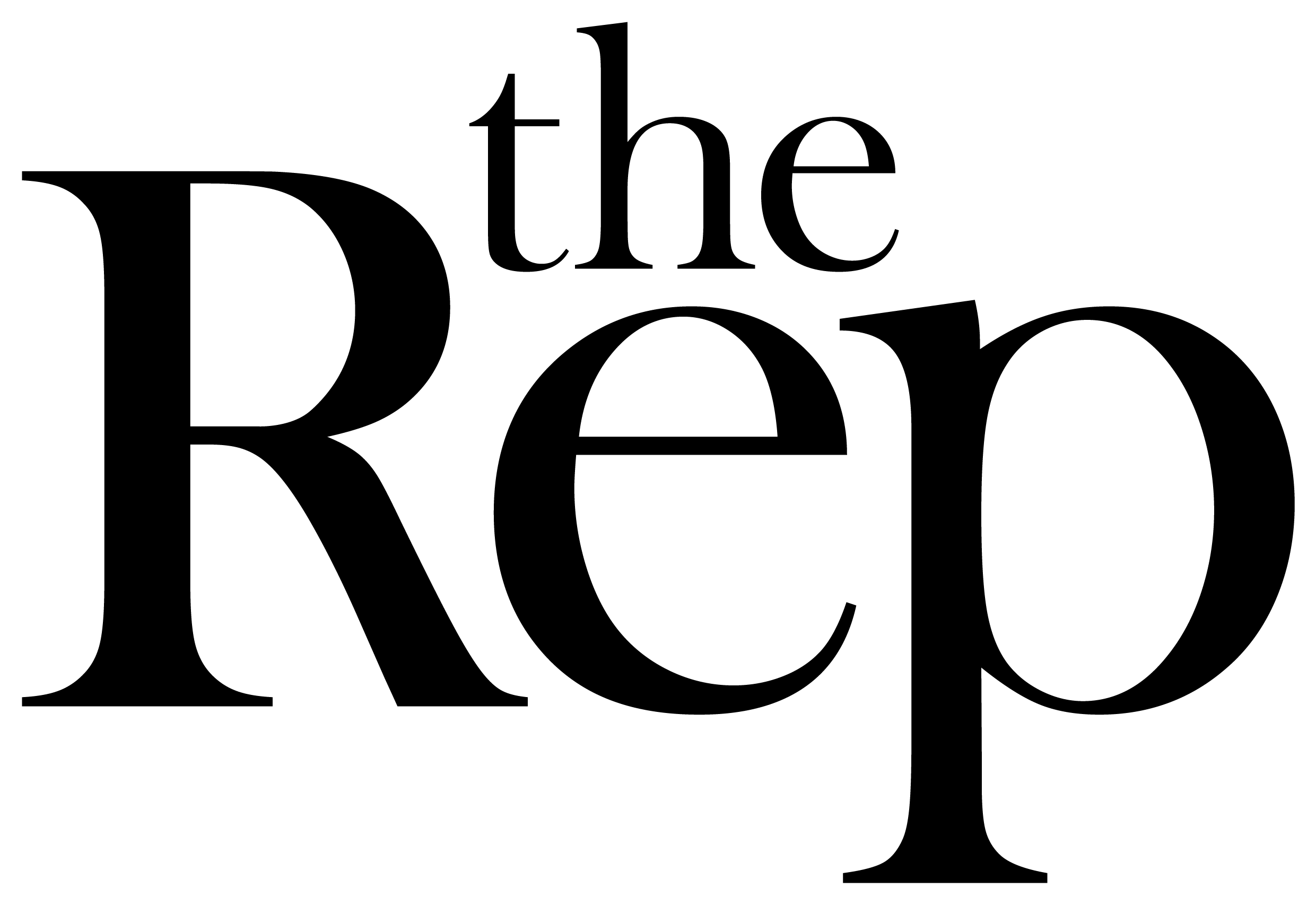

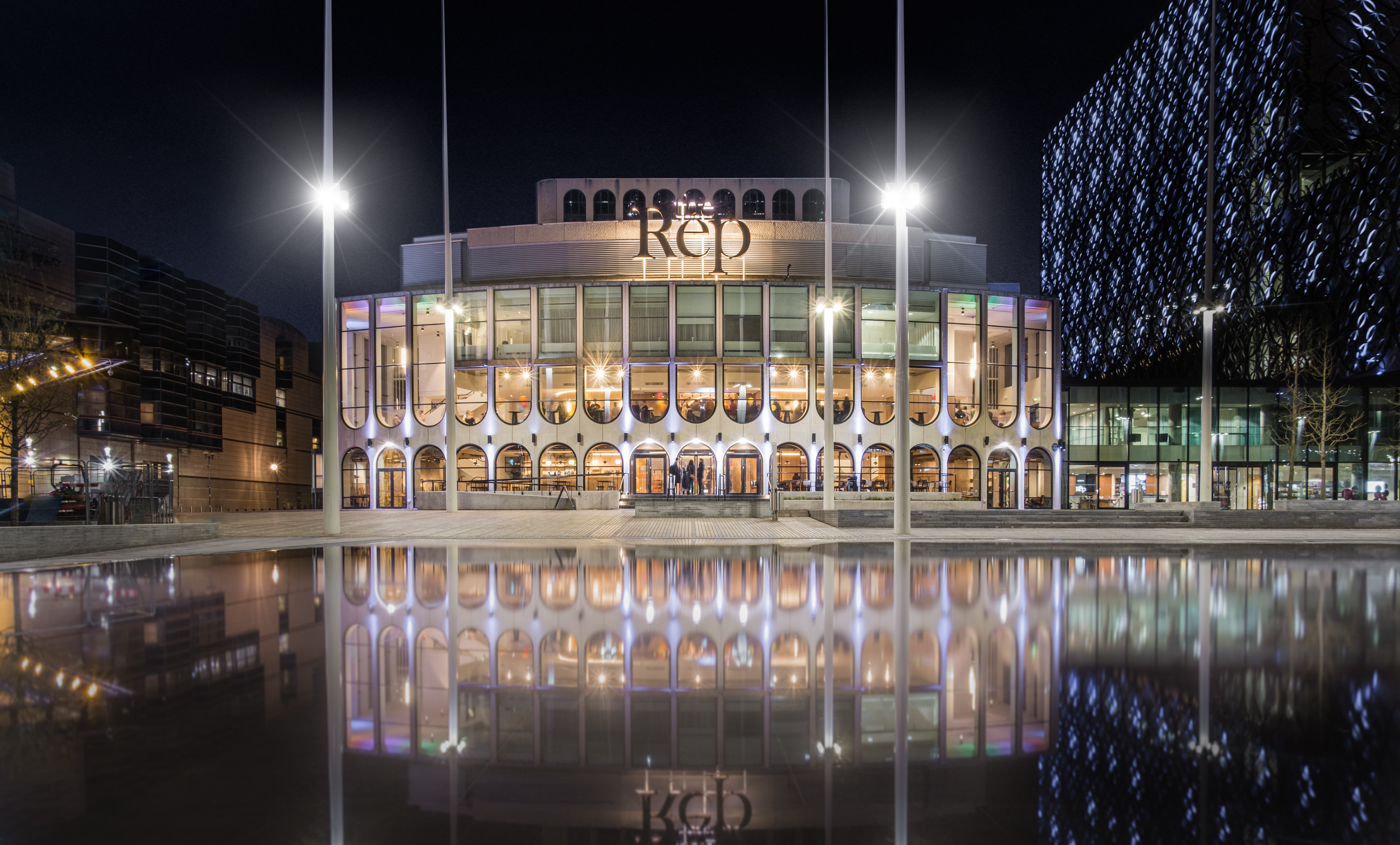
- Birmingham Rep in 2022
- Interactive map of Birmingham Rep
- Address: Centenary Square, Broad Street; Birmingham; England
- Coordinates: 52.479417°N 1.909414°W
- Capacity: 825 (The House); 300 (The Studio); 140 (The Door)
- Type: Amphitheatre; Studio

Construction
- Opened: 1913
- Rebuilt: 2013
- Architect: Graham Winteringham

Website
- birmingham-rep.co.uk

Birmingham Repertory Theatre, commonly called Birmingham Rep or just The Rep, is a producing theatre based on Centenary Square in Birmingham, England. Founded by Barry Jackson, it is the longest-established of Britain's building-based theatre companies and one of its most consistently innovative.

Today The Rep produces a wide range of drama in its three auditoria (825 seats, 300 seats, and 140 seats), much of which goes on to tour nationally and internationally. The company retains its commitment to new writing and in the five years to 2013 commissioned and produced 130 new plays.

The company's former home, now known as "The Old Rep", is still in use as a theatre.

== History ==
=== Foundation and early years ===
Barry Jackson, The Rep's founder, pictured in 1922.

The origins of The Rep lie with the 'Pilgrim Players', an initially amateur theatre company founded by Barry Jackson in 1907 to reclaim and stage English poetic drama, performing a repertoire that ranged from the 16th century morality play Interlude of Youth to contemporary works by W. B. Yeats. Over the next five years the company staged a total of 28 different productions, aiming to "put before the Birmingham public such plays as cannot be seen in the ordinary way at theatres", but also performing as far afield as London and Liverpool. Their success and reputation led them to turn professional and rename themselves the 'Birmingham Repertory Company' in 1911. By September 1912 Jackson had bought a site in Station Street in Birmingham City Centre and appointed an architect to design what would become Britain's first purpose-built repertory theatre. Construction started the following month and the building – now The Old Rep – opened with a production of Twelfth Night only four months later, on 15 February 1913.

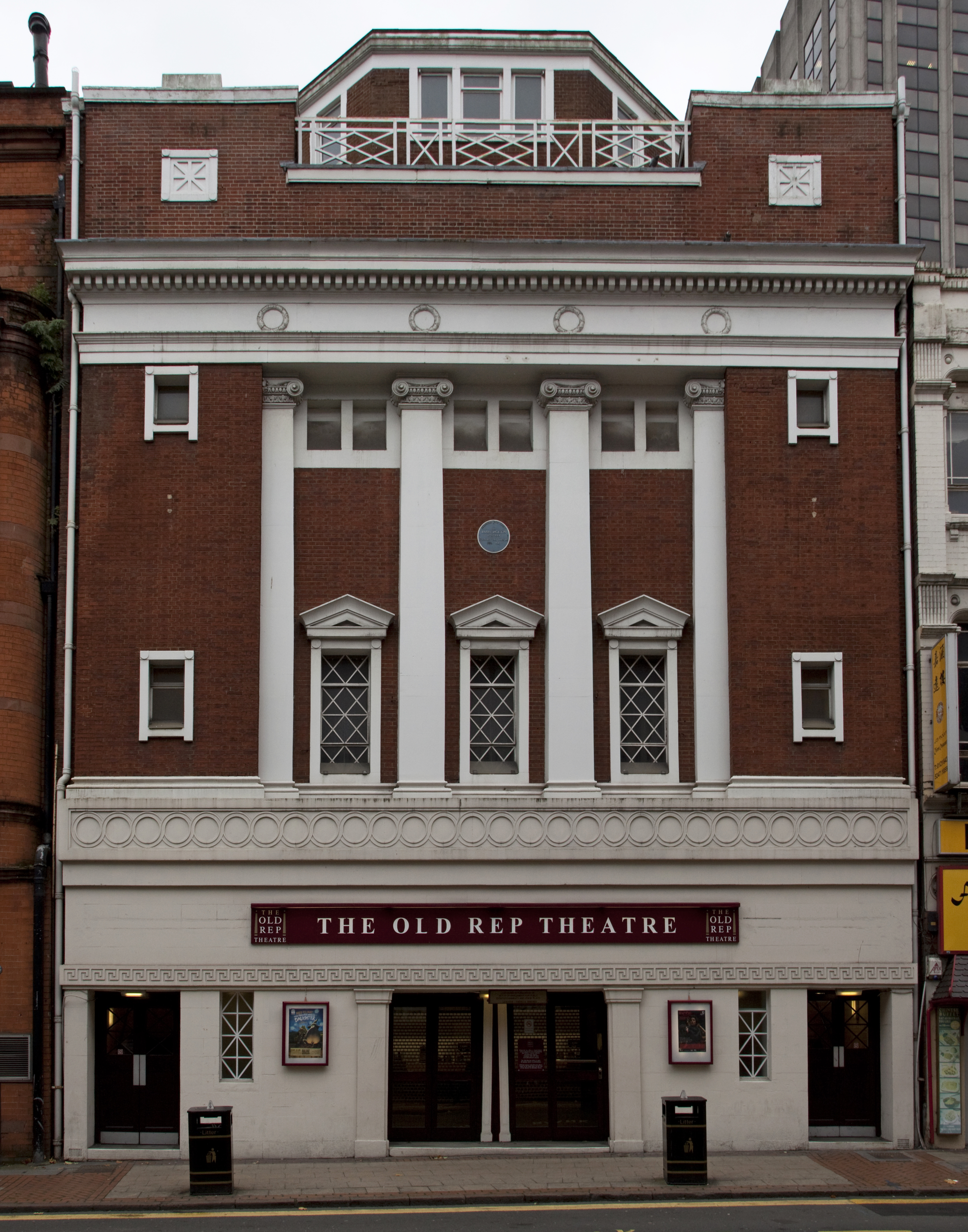
The Old Rep – The Rep's home from 1913 until 1971.

The Rep's stated mission was "to enlarge and increase the aesthetic sense of the public ... to give living authors an opportunity of seeing their works performed, and to learn something from the revival of the classics; in short to serve an art instead of making that art serve a commercial purpose". There had been earlier repertory theatres in Manchester, Glasgow and Liverpool, but the Birmingham project was unique. Previous companies had taken over large commercial theatres and been governed by Boards of Directors; the Birmingham Rep occupied a small-scale auditorium that seated only 464 and was under the sole control of Jackson, whose combination of the roles of patron and artistic director was unique in British theatrical history, allowing the development of a far more imaginative and eclectic programme. Instead of focusing on established star names and popular plays, Jackson's Rep was built around an ensemble cast of young emerging acting talent, performing a repertoire that mixed classics, new writing, experimental productions and the revival of rarely performed works. This was a pivotal development in the establishment of the modern British theatrical landscape, setting the pattern that would later be followed by post-war companies such as the National Theatre and the Royal Shakespeare Company.

The Rep developed its reputation with a series of artistic achievements whose effects would be felt far beyond Birmingham. Thirty-six plays were given their world premieres at The Rep during its first decade, with eight more, including major works by European writers such as Chekhov and Tolstoy, being given their British premieres. John Drinkwater had been one of the original members of the Pilgrim Players and was employed as the Rep's first manager when it opened in 1913. Jackson encouraged his development into a dramatist, presenting a series of his one-act plays and culminating in the 1918 premiere of his first full-length work Abraham Lincoln, whose triumphant success marked a turning point both for playwright and theatre. The Rep's 1923 production of George Bernard Shaw's epic five-play cycle Back to Methuselah gave the company "a profile and stature that set it apart from other repertory theatres in Britain, as well as according it an artistic credibility that no London theatre of the time could match." Of longest-lasting influence however was the production of Cymbeline that opened in Birmingham in April 1923. This was the first performance of Shakespeare to take place in modern dress and it "bewildered" critics, leading to what Jackson happily called "a national and worldwide controversy". The Rep's modern dress production of Hamlet, opening at the Kingsway in August 1925, was the first modern dress staging of a Shakespeare play in London and "was to be the real test" of the technique.

The company also came to be recognised as the country's leading training ground for actors and actresses who would later establish themselves as stars in London, New York or Hollywood. John Gielgud's performance as Romeo with the company in 1924 was his first major role. Peggy Ashcroft made her professional debut with Birmingham seasons in 1926 and 1927. Laurence Olivier's recruitment by The Rep in March 1926 marked his theatrical breakthrough; The Rep was, he later commented, "where I had dreamt of being, where I knew would be found the absolute foundation of any good that I could ever be in my profession".

In 1932, Jackson appointed Herbert M. Prentice as producer at the theatre. Prentice produced and directed over 900 plays before leaving in 1940, as well as writing scripts for some. Some of these were broadcast on BBC radio, and a few by the early BBC television service.

By the late 1920s Jackson occupied a "central and commanding" role in high-brow British theatre with Birmingham the nerve-centre of his activities. At least one production was presented in London every year from 1919 to 1935. In 1932, in addition to the programme in Birmingham, there were seven productions in London, a season at Malvern and national tours of Britain and Canada – in the 1980s it was commented that "it is difficult to conceive how even an organisation as well-endowed today as the National Theatre or Royal Shakespeare Company could achieve such miracles within twelve months".

=== Public ownership ===
Jackson single-handedly financed the theatre for over two decades, personally losing over £100,000. The scale of Jackson's financial commitment to The Rep was revealed by the recollections of George Bernard Shaw of his first meeting with Jackson in 1923:

'How much a year are you out of pocket by this culture theatre of yours?' I said. He named an annual sum that would have sufficed to support fifty labourers and their families. I remarked that this was not more than it would cost him to keep a thousand-ton steam yacht. He said a theatre was better fun than a steam yacht, but said it in the tone of a man who could afford a steam yacht.

— George Bernard Shaw

Jackson threatened to close the theatre at the end of the 1923–24 season after audiences at a production of Georg Kaiser's Gas in November 1923 averaged only 109 per night, but relented after commitments were made by 4,000 subscribers for the following season. A fundraising appeal in 1934 raised only £3,000 of its £20,000 target, however, leading Jackson to hand over ownership to a board of trustees in January 1935. Although this relieved Jackson of financial responsibility for the company, he would retain full artistic control until his death in 1961.

The Rep's radical reputation attracted young talent. Actors who first rose to prominence at the pre-war Rep included Laurence Olivier, Cedric Hardwicke, Gwen Ffrangcon-Davies, Edith Evans, Stewart Granger and Ralph Richardson.

By the outbreak of the Second World War the Rep was, alongside the Liverpool Playhouse, one of only two British theatres presenting programmes of quality drama outside London in accordance with the original aims of the repertory movement. An indication of the Rep's status in British theatre at this time was given by the Scottish playwright James Bridie, who wrote in 1938: "If we are to be bombed, a thorough razing from Piccadilly Circus to Drury Lane and down to The Strand would do less harm to the theatre than one bomb on Station Street, Birmingham."

All British theatres were closed for the first month of the war, and when the Rep reopened ticket sales were poor and staff had to take pay cuts.

=== During World War II ===
The director Peter Brook launched his career at the Rep in 1945 and directed three plays with Paul Scofield in 1945. Other post war actors included Stanley Baker, Albert Finney, Ian Richardson, Julie Christie, Derek Jacobi, Colin Jeavons and Timothy Spall (Cochrane 2003).

Sir Barry Jackson remained managing director of the theatre until his death in 1961.

=== Broad Street ===
In 1971 the company moved from Station Street to a new 901-seat theatre designed by Graham Winteringham and Keith Williams Architects on Broad Street, in the area that would later be developed as Centenary Square. The theatre was opened by Princess Margaret and the first production to be shown in the theatre was an adaptation of Jane Austen's Pride and Prejudice called First Impressions which starred Patricia Routledge. The building itself won a Royal Institute of British Architects award in 1972.

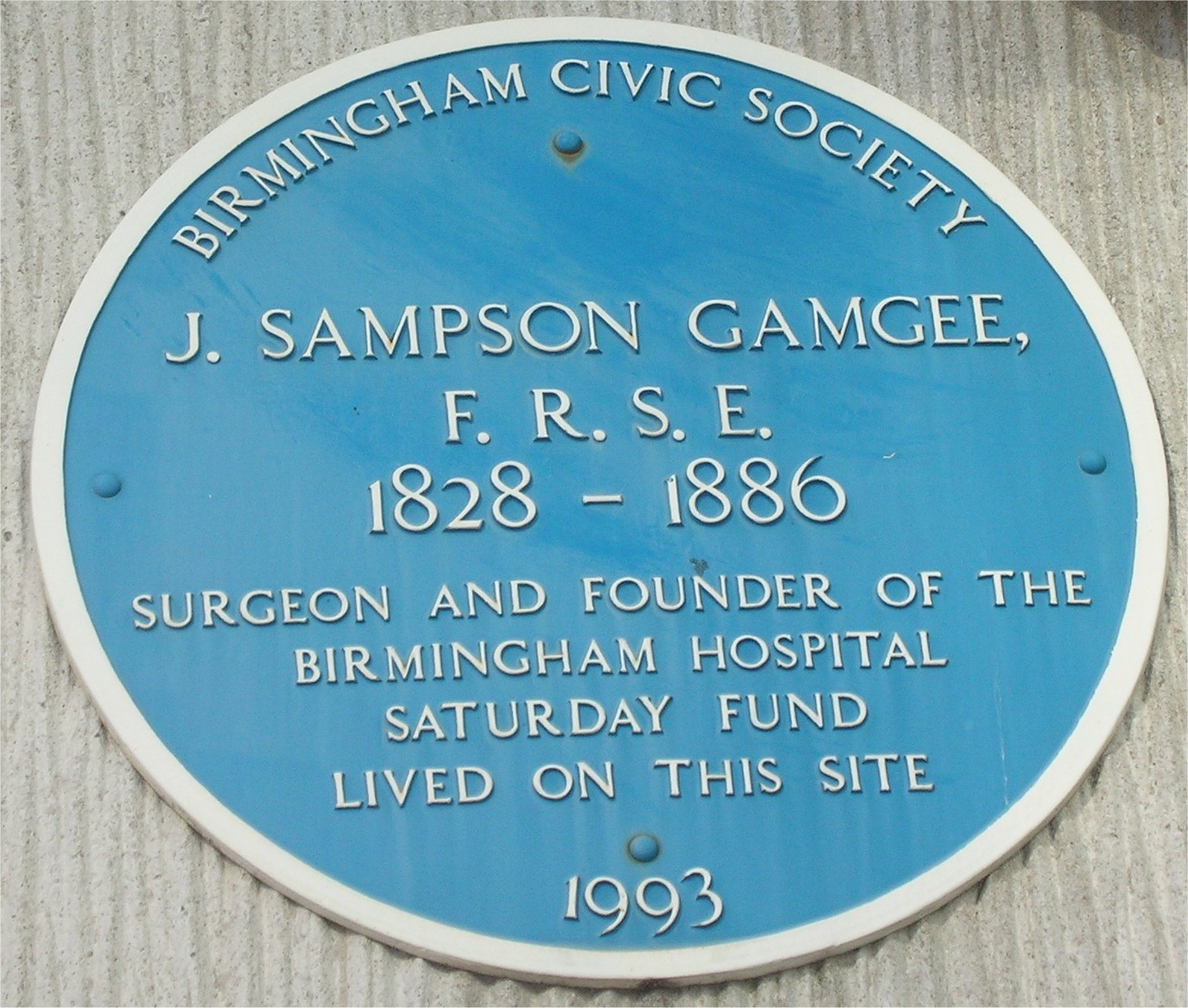
Blue plaque to Sampson Gamgee

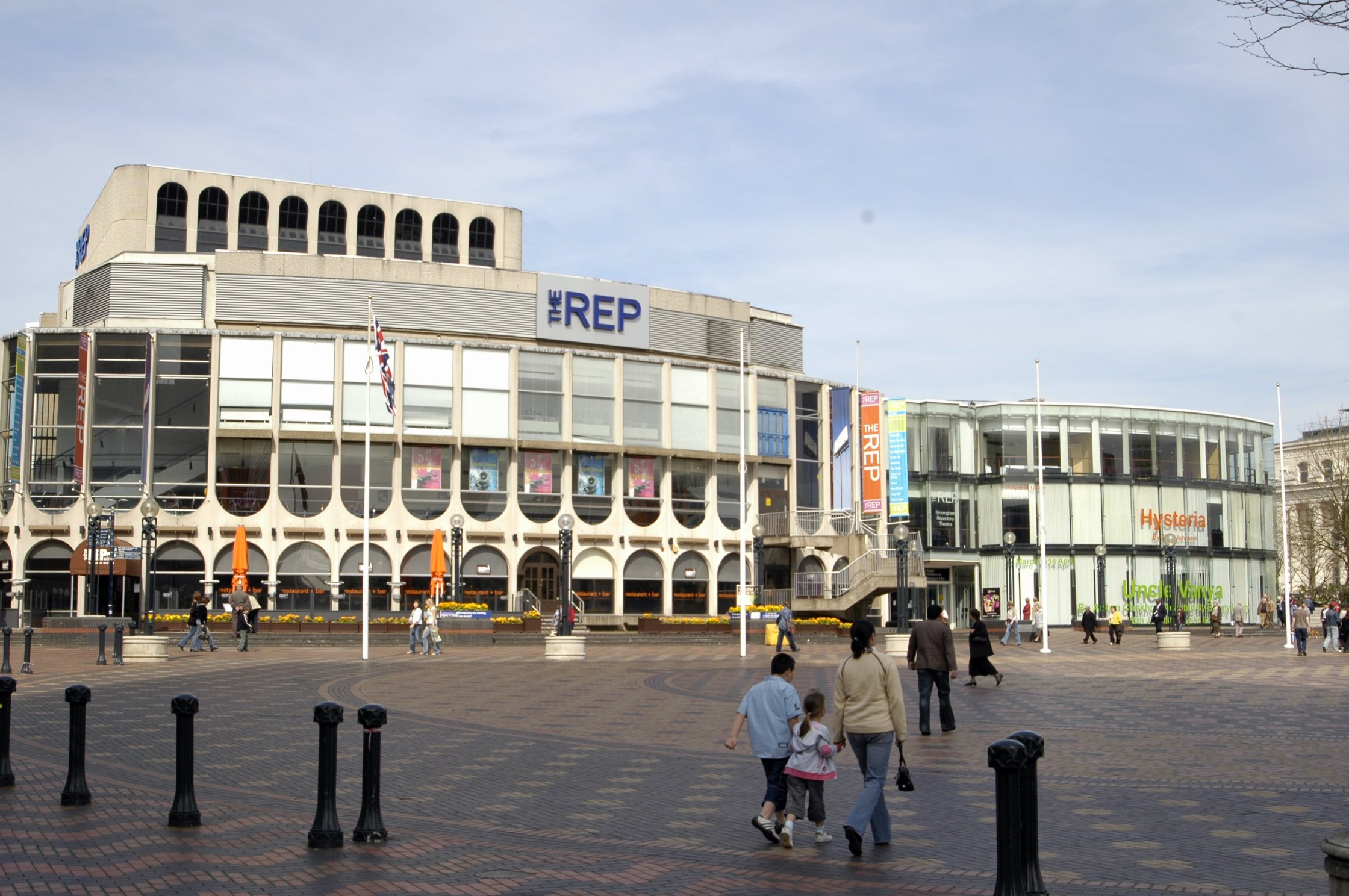
The Rep in 2007, before rebuilding as part of the Library of Birmingham project removed the 1991 extension, which can be seen to the right.

In 1972, the Studio opened; it became an example of innovative theatre nationwide. It targeted young audiences and showcased new writing, including the world premiere of Death Story by David Edgar. In 1974, David Edgar was made resident playwright. Despite the success of Oh Fair Jerusalem, the Rep board decided against staging Destiny because of its strong theme of racial tension, putting The Importance of Being Earnest on instead.

The escalating maintenance costs of the new building in the inflationary 1970s put pressure on the Rep's funding: in 1974–75 maintenance accounted for 66% of the theatre's budget. The theatre began to make losses during the mid-1970s and the Board of Directors was restructured in an attempt to secure funding.

The Studio became popular during the 1980s and in 1988, Kenneth Branagh temporarily relocated his Renaissance Theatre Company to the Rep which gave Birmingham the opportunity to showcase Shakespeare plays by guest directors such as Judi Dench and Derek Jacobi.

During the 1970s and 1980s the Studio was a regular home to the Birmingham Youth Theatre, a company which launched the careers of actors such as Andrew Tiernan and Adrian Lester.

The theatre was refurbished and extended in 1991 after the completion of the International Convention Centre. However, the Rep began to stop making profits as the country was hit by recession.

In 1998 the company opened "The Door" as a second auditorium specialising in new writing, replacing the Studio.

In 2004 the company controversially cancelled a series of performances of Gurpreet Kaur Bhatti's play Behzti after protests from Birmingham's large Sikh community.

One of the theatre's most notable productions is the stage version of Raymond Briggs' The Snowman which first premiered in 1993. It has since been presented at the Rep regularly at Christmas, as well at Sadler's Wells (Peacock Theatre) and across the UK and the world.

Between 2011 and 2013, the theatre was closed for rebuilding, as part of the Library of Birmingham complex. The company continued to perform from other local theatres during that time such as the New Alexandra Theatre, Crescent Theatre and The Old Rep.

There are two blue plaques on the exterior of the building, one commemorating the pioneer of aseptic surgery, Sampson Gamgee, who once lived on the site.

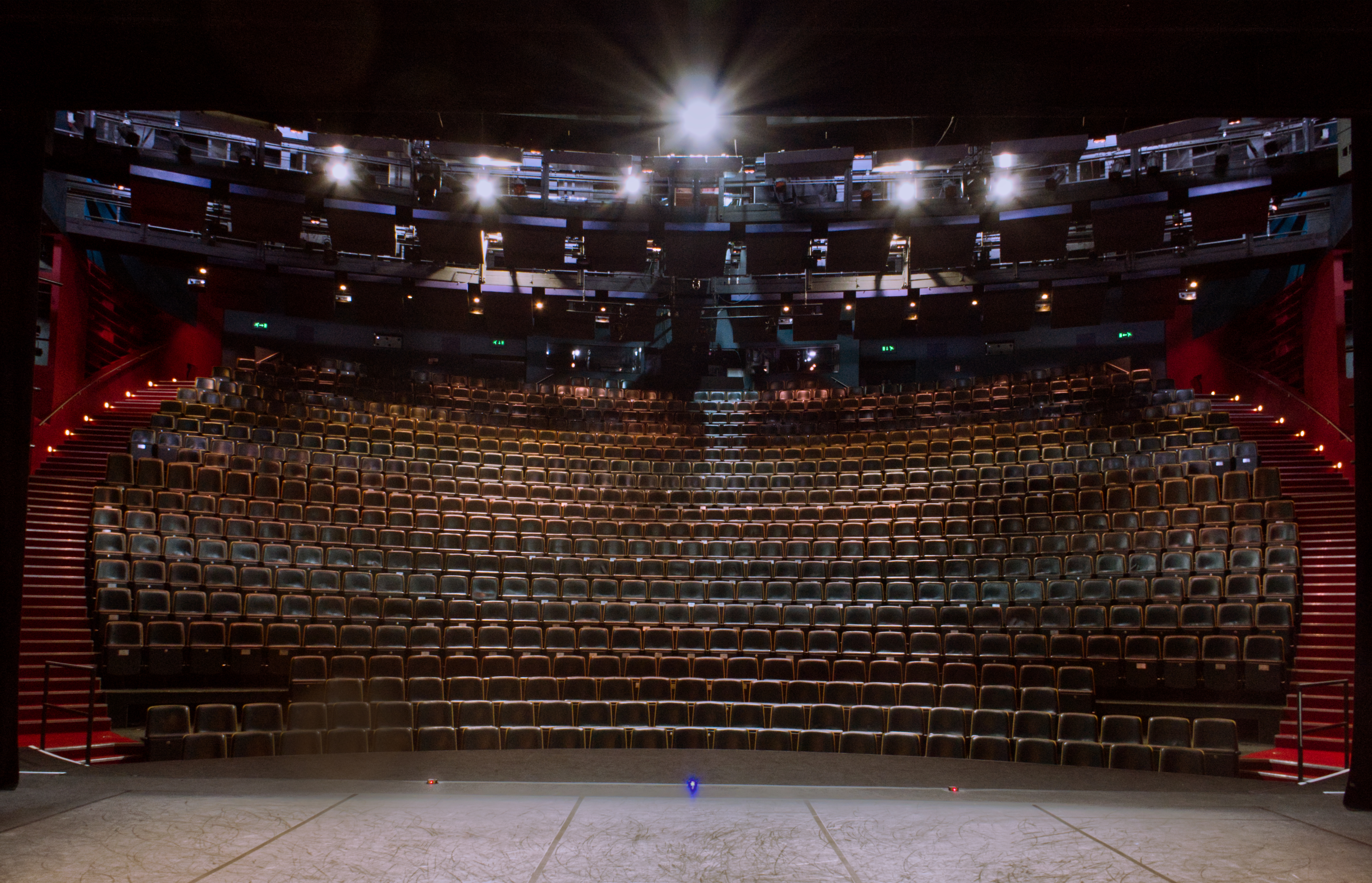
Auditorium of Birmingham Repertory Theatre (The Rep), seen from the stage - March 2022.

The Rep also has a youth theatre called "The Young Rep" which attend Saturday classes and produce and perform their own drama. Recently, the Young Rep have put on productions on the Main House Stage such as The Rotters Club and E. R. Braithwaite's To Sir With Love. DNA by Dennis Kelly was also performed by the Young Rep in the Studio Theatre in early 2018.

In the autumn of 2020, The Rep revealed that they would hire spaces to operate a Nightingale Court from December that year to until the summer of 2021 to secure its future in the face of closure due to the COVID-19 pandemic. This move divided opinion and was not received well by some artists, creatives and community leaders.

In July 2026, a revival of the Stephen Sondheim musical Sweeney Todd: The Demon Barber of Fleet Street starring Ramin Karimloo in the title role, Meow Meow as Mrs Lovett and David Bedella as Judge Turpin was directed by Joe Murphy in his inaugural season as Artistic Director. It became the Rep's most successful musical production, breaking box office records.

== Artistic directors ==
- John Adams (1987-1992)
- Bill Alexander (1992–2000)
- Jonathan Church (2001–2005)
- Rachel Kavanaugh (2006–2011)
- Roxanna Silbert (2012–2019)
- Sean Foley (2019–2024)
- Joe Murphy (2025–present)

== Notable productions ==
- Renaissance Theatre Company: Much Ado About Nothing, As You Like It and Hamlet (1987)
- The Snowman (1993)
- East Is East (1996)
- Frozen (1998)
- Brief Encounter (2007)
- Rudy's Rare Records (2014)
- The Exorcist (2016)
- What Shadows (2016)
- What's in a Name? (2017)
- One Love: The Bob Marley Musical (2017)
- Nativity! The Musical (2017)
- Rebus: Long Shadows (2018)
- The Lovely Bones (2018)
- Edmond de Bergerac (2019)
- What's New Pussycat? (2021)
- Idiots Assemble: Spitting Image Saves The World (2023)
- The Way Old Friends Do (2023)
- Sinatra: The Musical (2023)
- Bhangra Nation (2024)
- Withnail and I (2024)
- Becoming Nancy (2024)
- Starter for Ten (2025)
- Sherlock Holmes and The 12 Days of Christmas (2025)
- Small Island (2026)
- Sweeney Todd: The Demon Barber of Fleet Street (2026)

== Bibliography ==
- Cochrane, Claire (2003). The Birmingham Rep - A city's theatre 1962-2002. Sir Barry Jackson Trust. ISBN 0954571908.
- Conolly, Leonard W. (2002). "Introduction". In Conolly, Leonard W. (ed.). Bernard Shaw and Barry Jackson. Selected Correspondence of Bernard Shaw. Toronto: University of Toronto Press. pp. xi–xxxvi. ISBN 0802035728.
- Rowell, George; Jackson, Tony (1984). The Repertory Movement: A History of Regional Theatre in Britain. Cambridge: Cambridge University Press. ISBN 0521319196.
- Trewin, J. C. (1963). The Birmingham Repertory Theatre 1913-1963. London: Barrie and Rockliff. OCLC 469519557.
- Turnbull, Olivia (2008). Bringing Down the House: The Crisis in Britain's Regional Theatres. Bristol: Intellect Books. ISBN 978-1841502083.
