= Stafford Arima =

Canadian-born theatre director

Stafford Arima (born March 14, 1969) is a Canadian-born theatre director. Arima studied at York University in Toronto, where he was the recipient of the Dean's Prize for Excellence in Creative Work. He is a member of the SDC (Stage Directors and Choreographers Society) and CAEA. In April 2017, he became the artistic director of Theatre Calgary. He is a founding Board member of the Canadian Guild of Stage Directors and Choreographers (CGDC).

== Career ==
Arima became the first Asian Canadian to direct a musical on Broadway when Allegiance opened on November 8, 2015 at the Longacre Theatre starring George Takei and Lea Salonga.

Most recently he directed Forgiveness adapted by Hiro Kanagawa based on Mark Sakamoto’s memoir at the Stratford Shakespeare Festival where he was awarded the Tyrone Guthrie Derek F. Mitchell Artistic Director Award for Best Director; and the musical Bhangra Nation at the Birmingham Rep in the UK.

He directed the "revisal" of the musical, Carrie, with a book by Lawrence D. Cohen, music by Michael Gore and lyrics by Dean Pitchford, for the MCC Theater. The production opened Off-Broadway in March 2012 and was nominated for a Drama Desk Award and Outer Critics Circle Award for Outstanding Revival of a Musical.

Arima directed the critically acclaimed musical Altar Boyz, which opened Off-Broadway at New World Stages/ Stage IV in March 2005. The musical received the 2005 Best Off-Broadway Musical Outer Critics Circle Award and was nominated for a Drama League Award as Outstanding Musical.

Other work includes the West End premiere of the Stephen Flaherty and Lynn Ahrens musical Ragtime, which was recognized in 2004 with eight Olivier Award nominations including Best Director and Best Musical; concert-productions of The Secret Garden which was presented at Lincoln Center in 2016, and the 25th Anniversary reunion production of Ragtime, at the Minskoff Theatre (2023); Bhangin' It (La Jolla Playhouse), The Secret Garden (Toho, Japan); Two Class Acts by A.R. Gurney (The Flea Theater); Bare: A Pop Opera (by Jon Hartmere and Damon Intrabartolo); Jacques Brel Is Alive and Well and Living in Paris (Stratford Shakespeare Festival); Roundabout Theatre Company's production of The Tin Pan Alley Rag; Saturday Night (musical) (York Theatre Company); The Princess and the Black-Eyed Pea (San Diego Rep.); The New World (Bucks County Playhouse); Bowfire (PBS television special/world tour); Leonard Bernstein’s Candide (San Francisco Symphony); Poster Boy (Williamstown Theatre Festival); Ace (Old Globe, CA); Red Velvet (Old Globe, CA); “A Tribute to Stephen Sondheim” (Boston Pops); Paul Scott Goodman's Bright Lights, Big City (Prince Music Theater); Guys and Dolls (Paper Mill Playhouse); Abyssinia (Goodspeed Musicals); Chef’s Theater (The Supper Club, New York City); Rags - In Concert (Nokia Theatre Times Square, New York City); Christopher Hampton’s Total Eclipse (Toronto); and Children's Letters to God (Off-Broadway); and Forgiveness;Billy Elliot; A Christmas Carol and Mary & Max - A New Musical at Theatre Calgary.

Arima served as associate director for the Broadway productions of A Class Act (2001) and Seussical (2000).

In addition to Arima’s directing work, he is a faculty member of Broadway Dreams and an adjunct professor at UC Davis where he was awarded the 2013 "Granada Artists-in-Residence."
