= Sinnekins =

Stock characters often found in medieval drama

Sinnekins are stock characters often found in medieval drama, especially morality plays. They most often occur as pairs of devilish characters who exert their perfidious influence on the main character of the drama.

The word sinnekin comes from the Dutch word sinneken which, by 1604, connoted the words "senses" or "meanings". The word's alternative meaning, drawn from sixteenth-century Dutch rederijker drama, was "a symbolic or allegorical person in a spel van sinne," an allegorically fashioned dramatic exposition of an argument on an ethical, ideological, political, or religious issue.

Like the fool with his bauble, the sinneken functioned as had the Devil in earlier medieval drama; by their costumes, actions, and words these characters usually supplied examples of foolish behavior. Sinnekins, then, are allegorical characters who, in some way, instruct the audience on folly through their temptation of the main character. Indeed, sinnekens often argued for rational behavior (i.e. the repentance and salvation of the audience) while acting in just the opposite manner (i.e. foolishly).

== See also ==
- Medieval theatre
- Morality play
- The Castle of Perseverance (c.1400-1500)
- Mankind (c.1470)
- Elckerlijc (c.1470)
- Everyman (c.1450-1500)
- The World and the Child, also known as Mundas et Infans (c.1508)
- Interlude of Youth (c.1550s)
- Horestes (1567)
- The Vice
