= Mark Saltzman =

American script writer

- Education: Cornell University
- Occupations: Writer, playwright, lyricist
- Years active: 1980s-present

Mark Saltzman is an American script writer who has written films, stage plays and musicals and for TV. He worked for several years for PBS's Sesame Street. He has been given seven Emmy Awards for Best Writing for a Children's Show.

== TV and film work ==
He graduated from Cornell University.

Saltzman started his career writing cabaret shows and musicals that played at New York City venues such as The Ballroom, Soho Rep, 13th Street Theater, and The Village Gate, where he co-wrote the long-running revue A, My Name is Alice.

As a writer on the musical revue A, My Name Is Alice, he befriended the late cast member Alaina Reed, who had also been cast as Olivia on Sesame Street. Saltzman began working for Sesame Street in 1984, where he was a writer for 15 years. He created the Muppet character of Plácido Flamingo for season 18, and wrote more than 50 songs, including the lyrics for "Caribbean Amphibian" and "I've Got a New Way to Walk." He also created the character The Sublime Miss M, a take on Bette Midler. He has seven Emmy Awards.

For CBS, Saltzman wrote Mrs. Santa Claus, a holiday musical movie starring Angela Lansbury with songs written by Broadway legend Jerry Herman. He also wrote The Adventures of Milo and Otis and Three Ninjas Kick Back.

His TV movie, The Red Sneakers, which was directed by and starred Gregory Hines, aired on Showtime in 2004 and was nominated for a Writers Guild Award. For cable TV's Here! network, Saltzman wrote the screenplay for Third Man Out, based on the novel by Richard Stevenson.

In 2007, Mark served as writer-producer of the Emmy-nominated Disney Channel preschool show "Johnny and the Sprites," starring John Tartaglia.

Saltzman wrote The Adventures of Milo and Otis, Napoleon and 3 Ninjas Kick Back. He has also written screenplays for Sony, Universal Studios, and Disney.

== Theater ==
Saltzman's musical play The Tin Pan Alley Rag tells the story of a fictional meeting in 1915 between Scott Joplin and a young Irving Berlin. Tin Pan opened at the Pasadena Playhouse in 1997 and was nominated for five Los Angeles Ovation Awards, including Best Musical. Saltzman also wrote the book for the play. The show continued on to many US theaters, including Miami's Coconut Grove Playhouse, Goodspeed Musicals, and the Cleveland Play House. In the summer of 2009, it was produced in Off-Broadway by The Roundabout Theatre Company in a production starring Michael Therriault and Michael Boatman in a production described by critics as "tunefully original" and containing "flashes of brilliance."

Saltzman's stage musical Romeo and Bernadette played at the Coconut Grove Playhouse in Miami and New Jersey's State Theater, The Paper Mill Playhouse. His comedy Mr. Shaw Goes to Hollywood, based on the true story of George Bernard Shaw's 1933 visit to MGM, premiered at the Laguna Playhouse in April 2003. His play, Clutter, had its world premier at the Colony Theater in Burbank on February 7 of 2004. In 2002 he adapted the musical classic Show Boat for a Hollywood Bowl performance.

In May 2009, Saltzman's play "Setup and Punch" premiered at The Blank Theatre in Los Angeles.

His play Rocket City had its world premiere in April 2008 as part of the Alabama Shakespeare Festival's Southern Writers' Project, which has a mandate to encourage "plays that delve into Southern issues and the African American experience" and to contribute "nationally significant works to the American theater canon." Rocket City, or Rocket City, Alabam', is based on the true story of Wernher von Braun and his recruitment by the US Government to work on the U.S. missile program and eventually the Saturn V, the rocket used in the Apollo program. Saltzman's play weaves von Braun's real-life in Huntsville, Alabama, with a fictional plot in which a young Jewish woman in Huntsville becomes aware of von Braun's Nazi past and tries to inspire awareness and outrage among Huntsville's long-established Jewish community, the town in general, and the country at large.

== Affiliations ==
Saltzman has, for many years, been a mentor in the Blank Theatre Company's Young Playwrights’ Festival, held annually in Los Angeles. He is the president of the Arnold Glassman Fund, a charitable foundation that provides grants for film and theater projects. He is also a graduate of Cornell University's English and Theater Departments.

== Personal life ==
Saltzman's partner, Arnold "Arnie" Glassman, was a film editor known for his work on The Celluloid Closet and Frailty. After first meeting in October 1979, by 1986 they were living together as an out couple in New York. They were together for 20 years before Glassman died in 2003. According to Saltzman, when writing two Sesame Street characters Bert and Ernie, he wrote their interpersonal dynamic, playfulness and loving bond as a reflection of his own relationship with Glassman.

Saltzman currently lives in Los Angeles.
