= Crescent Theatre =

Multi-venue theatre in Birmingham, England

Coordinates: 52°28′38.27″N 1°54′55.48″W

The Crescent Theatre
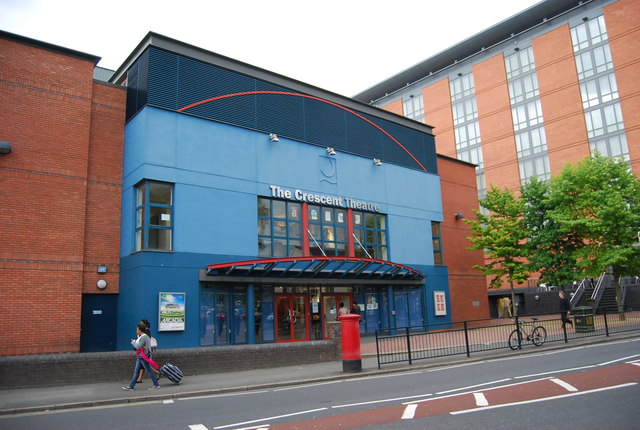
- The Theatre from Sheepcote Street
- Interactive map of The Crescent Theatre
- Address: Sheepcote Street; Birmingham; England
- Capacity: 340 (Main House); 120 (Ron Barber Studio); 70 (Bar); 40 (Roma's Room)
- Type: Proscenium; Studio
- Public transit: Birmingham New Street/ Five Ways

Construction
- Opened: 1932
- Rebuilt: 1964; 1997
- Architect: Graham Winteringham

Website
- crescent-theatre.co.uk

The Crescent Theatre is a multi-venue theatre run mostly by volunteers in Birmingham City Centre. It is part of the Brindleyplace development on Sheepcote Street. It has a resident company, one of the oldest theatre companies in the city, and is a founding member of the Little Theatre Guild of Great Britain. As a venue, it also hires its four performance spaces to a host of visitors each year, nationally and internationally, both amateur and professional.

In their centenary year, June 2024, it was announced that they would be taking over the running of the historic Old Rep Theatre from August 2024, alongside its own theatre complex in Brindleyplace.

== History ==
The company began, as the Municipal Players, in 1924, being an amateur company made up of City Council employees. The first theatre was a converted building, formerly Baskerville Hall, in The Crescent, Cambridge Street. The first production in this original theatre was Edmund Rostand's "The Romantics" in 1932. The company moved to newly built premises on Cumberland Street in 1964, designed by Graham Winteringham of S.T. Walker and Partners, with a seating capacity of 296. The apron stage and first seven rows of seats were on a revolving platform to turn the interior into an arena theatre. The two-storey building was faced with London stock bricks and black-framed windows. Phase Two of the construction would have included a restaurant and a rehearsal stage.

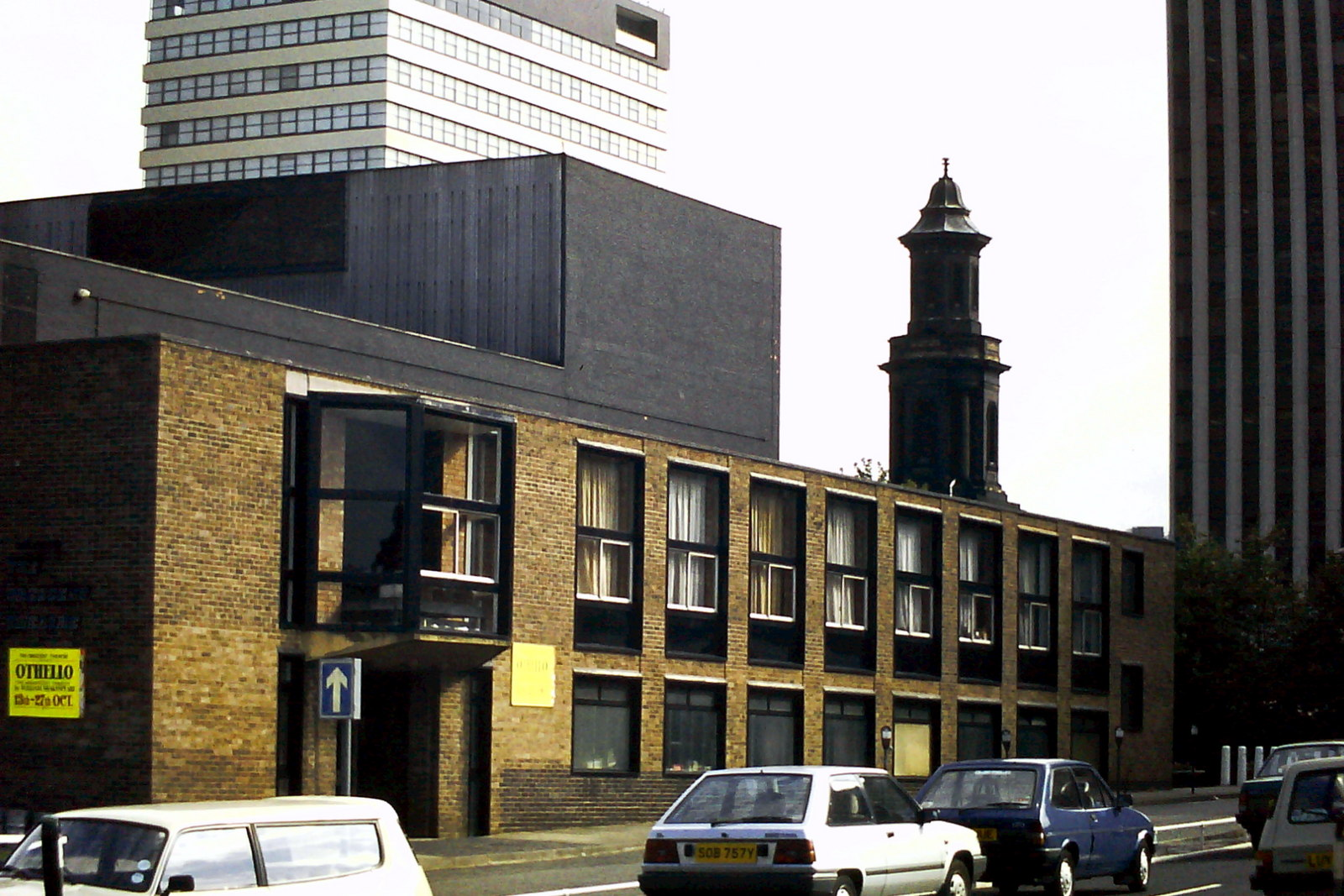
The second theatre on Cumberland Street, 1964–1998

The present theatre was opened in 1998 by Celia Imrie. The theatre it replaced was demolished in the same year. It houses four performance spaces: The Main House, Ron Barber Studio, Roma's Room, and the Bar with capacities of 340, 120, 40 and 70 respectively. The building was designed by Terry Farrell and John Chatwin.

The theatre is run by a board of directors elected from the membership including chairman, secretary and treasurer. They oversee the general direction of the theatre and all the membership activities. There is a small team of paid staff who look after the day-to-day running of the building and supervise the hire operation.

The theatre has hosted a variety of events for Birmingham Royal Ballet, Birmingham Rep, the NHS and the BBC, including recent live broadcasts of Radio 1's Newsbeat and Radio 4's Any Questions.
