= The Tin Pan Alley Rag =

Musical written by Mark Saltzman

- Original language: English
- Written by: Mark Saltzman

Premiere
- Date: 27 December 2009
- Place: United Kingdom
- Directed by: Stafford Arima

The Tin Pan Alley Rag is a 2009 biographical musical play produced by The Roundabout Theatre Company. The play is set in 1915 and is about Irving Berlin and Scott Joplin and their careers at the Tin Pan Alley in New York City, centered on a fictional meeting between the two composers. It was written by Mark Saltzman and directed by Stafford Arima.

In the New York version, the lead role of Irving Berlin was played by Michael Therriault and that of Scott Joplin by Michael Boatman.

== Production detail ==
- Written by: Mark Saltzman
- Directed by: Stafford Arima
- Music and lyrics - Irving Berlin and Scott Joplin
- Original music and songs - Brad Ellis
- Choreography - Liza Gennaro
- Music direction, orchestration and arrangement - Michael Patrick Walker
- Sets - Beowulf Boritt
- Costumes - Jess Goldstein
- Lighting - Howell Binkley
- Sound - Walter Trarbach
- Associate artistic director - Scott Ellis
- Presented by the Roundabout Theater Company, Todd Haimes, artistic director.

== Characters ==
Irving Berlin, Scott Joplin, Willie, Rev. Alexander, Dorothy Goetz, Monisha, Jimmy Kelly, Mooney Mulligan, Teddy Snyder, Mr. Payton, Sophie and Freddie Alexander.
