= Herbert Prentice =

British theatre producer and director

- Born: June 1890
- Died: 1 June 1963 (aged 72–73)
- Occupation: Theatrical producer, theatre director, theatre designer

Herbert Major Prentice (1890–1963 (Note: Some sources erroneously give his year of birth as 1896, and his year of death as 1955)) was a British theatre producer and director, and founder of the Sheffield Repertory Company. He also wrote scripts for some of his productions.

He was born in June 1890, the son of Thomas and Hezia Prentice.

His first credit was in 1918, as producer of The Silver Box at Sheffield's Little Theatre. After seven years working in Sheffield, where he undertook his own stage design, he worked at Northampton Repertory Theatre. and Terence Gray's Festival Theatre at Cambridge, where in April 1927 he directed George Bernard Shaw's Androcles and the Lion.

In 1932 he was taken on by Barry Jackson as a producer for the Birmingham Repertory Theatre, remaining until 1940, producing over nine hundred plays there. During that period he also produced works in London (the first being Once in a Lifetime in 1933) and, from 1934 to 1937, for Barry Jackson's Malvern Festivals.

Several of his Birmingham Repertory productions were aired by BBC radio, and in 1938 he directed the Birmingham Repertory Company in a production of Laugh with Me, a comedy, and another of The Wooing of Anne Hathaway, which were screened by the early BBC television service on 2 October and 27 November respectively.

After leaving Birmingham Rep he worked at Sheffield, Southport Repertory Theatre, Stratford-on-Avon, Birmingham, Chesterfield Civic Theatre and the Pitlochry Festival.

His dramatisation of Alice's Adventures in Wonderland premiered at the Shakespeare Memorial Theatre, Stratford-upon-Avon in 1947, and was in turn adapted for television by John Glyn-Jones and shown by the BBC on Christmas Day 1948. The BBC screened another adaptation of the play in 1956.

Prentice died on 1 June 1963 at Cheltenham General Hospital, two weeks before his 73rd birthday. He was living at The Beehive in Chipping Campden, and was survived by his wife. His papers were acquired by the New York Public Library in August 1964. (Note: The last of these is dated 1960)
