= Bhangra Nation =

2022 musical

A Beat of Our Own (formerly Bhangra Nation)
- Music: Sam Willmott
- Lyrics: Sam Willmott
- Book: Mike Lew; Rehana Lew Mirza
- Premiere: March 8, 2022: La Jolla Playhouse, San Diego
- Productions: 2022 San Diego; 2024 Birmingham; 2026 Princeton

Bhangra Nation is a musical with a book by Mike Lew and Rehana Lew Mirza, music and lyrics by Sam Willmott.

== Production history ==
=== World premiere: La Jolla Playhouse (2022) ===
The musical made its world premiere under its original title Bhangin' It at La Jolla Playhouse in San Diego from March 8 to April 17, 2022. The production was directed by Stafford Arima and choreographed by Rujuta Vaidya.

=== Birmingham (2024) ===
The musical made its UK premiere under the new title Bhangra Nation at the Birmingham Repertory Theatre from 17 February to 16 March 2024. The production was once again directed by Arima and choreographed by Vaidya with a new creative team. Critics praised the 2024 Birmingham premiere cast, with The Stage noting Siobhan Athwal's 'vibrant' lead performance and describing Sohm Kapila's Rekha as 'instinctively fabulous,' while WhatsonStage highlighted the 'superb comic timing' of the ensemble.

=== McCarter Theatre Center (2026) ===
The musical once again changed names to A Beat of Our Own for its next production in Princeton, NJ.

== Cast and characters ==
Character	San Diego	Birmingham	Princeton
Character	2022	2024	2026
Preeti	Vinithra Raj	Zaynah Ahmed	Tara Venkataraman
Jake	Terrance Johnson	Gregory Armand	
Sunita	Jaya Joshi	Siobhan Athwal	Sushma Saha
Lily	Madison McBride	Tia Antoine Charles	
Shilpa	Ramita Ravi	Lydia Danistan	
Noah	Henry Walter Greenberg	Kyle Evans	
Billy	Brandon Contreras	Iván Fernández González	J. Antonio Rodriguez
Mohan	Aryaan Arora	Kuldeep Goswami	
Wallace	Jason Heil	Bob Harms	
Varun	Zain Patel	Raimu Itfum	
New Mary	Devi Peot	Sophie Kandola	
Rekha	Alka Nayyar	Sohm Kapila	Sohm Kapila
Shetal	Anu Mysore	Arysha Kelly	
Constance	Laura Dadap	Ai Kumar	
Amit	Bilaal Avaz	Mervin Noronha	Rohit Gopal
Mary	Ari Afsar	Jena Pandya	Salena Queshi
Gobind	Jesse Bhamrah	Ajay Sahota	
Just Bob	Amey Natu	Leo Udvarlaky	
Swings	Nikki Miraz; Devina Sabnis; Gerry Tonella; Levin Valayil	RoMaya Jey; Aaron Mistry; Edward Turner; Louis Mackrodt	Kavya Bhat Kabir Gandhi Brianna Aisjah Pember Sammy Pignalosa Sunayna Smith Gus Stuckey
