= Graham Winteringham =

English architect (1923–2023)

Graham Winteringham (2 March 1923 – 29 January 2023) was an English architect. His work consisted of public buildings and the restoration of historic buildings.

== Early life ==
Winteringham was born in Louth, Lincolnshire. He studied at Birmingham School of Architecture (which became part of Birmingham Polytechnic) after serving in the Royal Navy and Fleet Air Arm during World War II, having been called up in 1942.

== Public buildings ==
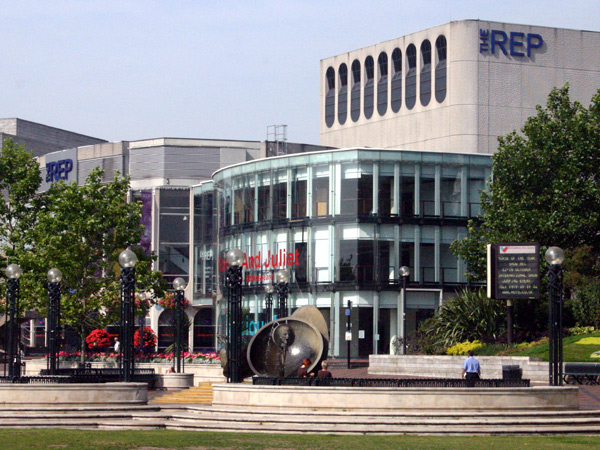
The Birmingham Repertory Theatre

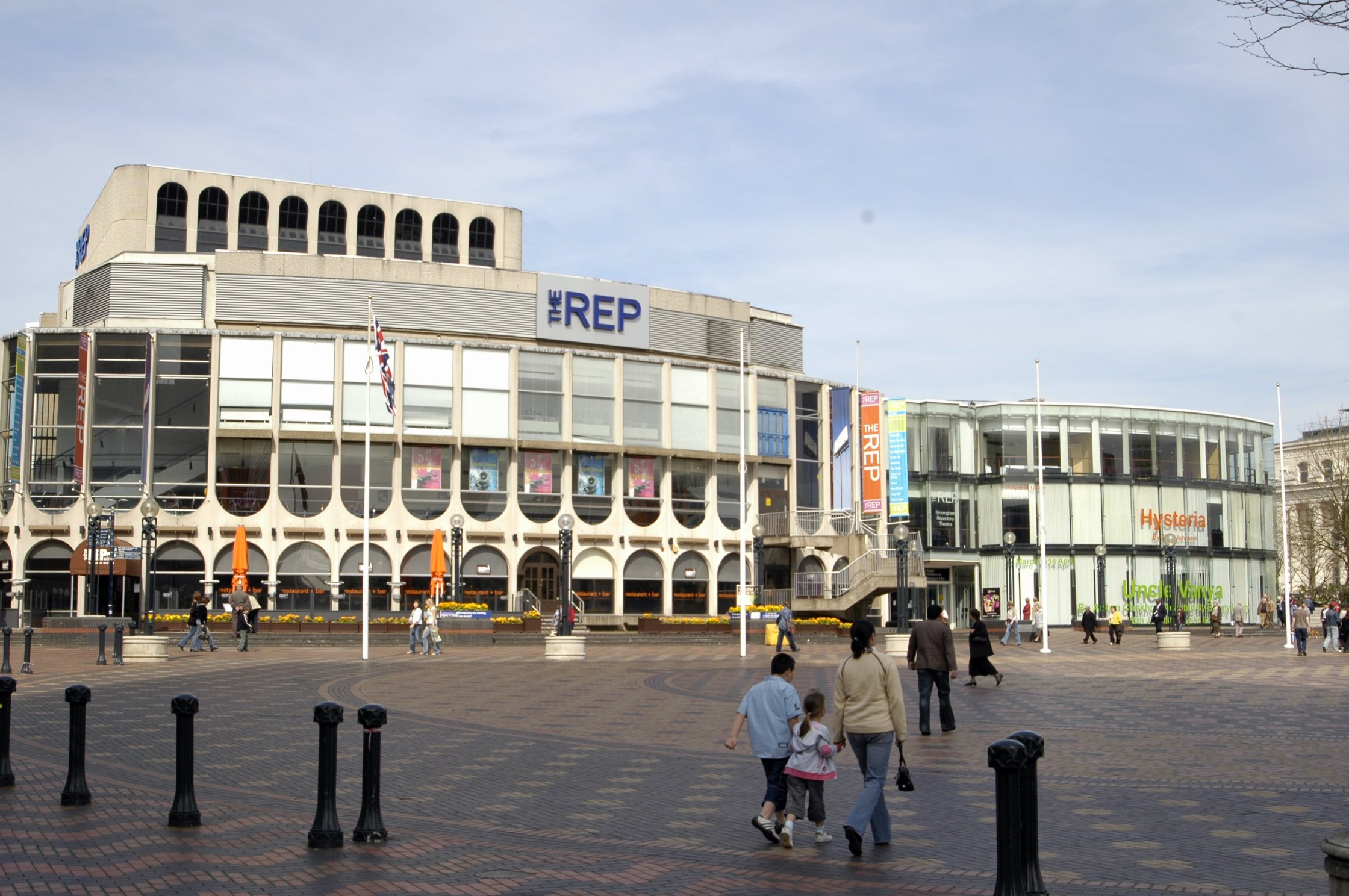
The Birmingham Repertory Theatre from Broad Street

The 300-seat Crescent Theatre building was designed by Winteringham and built on Cumberland Street in Birmingham in 1964. The building featured a revolving auditorium and stage which gave flexibility to theatre designers and directors.

In 1972, Winteringham received a Royal Institute of British Architects award for his design of the Birmingham Repertory Theatre, one of the largest theatres of its type in Britain. Opened in 1971 by Princess Margaret, the 901-seat theatre forms the centerpiece of Centenary Square in central Birmingham.

== Building restoration ==
Rosehill House, forming part of the Ironbridge Gorge World Heritage Site, has been documented in Emyr Thomas's book Coalbrookdale and the Darbys. By 1979, when Winteringham first produced a detailed restoration report, the house had become uninhabitable. A year later, a full restoration programme commenced and the building was officially opened to the public in 1985 by Sir Adrian Cadbury.

== Death ==
Winteringham's death at the age of 99 was announced on 1 February 2023.
