= Barry Jackson (director) =

English theatre director (1879–1961)

Sir Barry Jackson
- Born: Barry Vincent Jackson; 6 September 1879; Kings Norton, Worcestershire, England
- Died: 3 April 1961 (aged 81); Birmingham, England
- Occupations: Theatre director, entrepreneur
- Partner: Scott Sunderland

Sir Barry Vincent Jackson (6 September 1879 – 3 April 1961) was an English theatre director, entrepreneur and the founder of the Birmingham Repertory Theatre and, alongside George Bernard Shaw, the Malvern Festival.

== Early life ==
Jackson was born on 6 September 1879 in Kings Norton, Worcestershire the son of George and Jane (née Spreadborough) Jackson. The Jacksons were a prominent and wealthy family of merchant grocers. His father, George, was a prominent businessman who was passionate about the theatre, reportedly naming his son for renowned British stage actor Barry Sullivan.

From a young age, Jackson was exposed to the theatre and to the arts, from school where he was privately educated, to regularly attending the theatre, opera and ballet. The young Jackson saw his first Shakespeare production, The Taming of the Shrew, performed by the Frank Benson Company when he was ten years old.

In his teenage years, he travelled around Europe, visiting Greece and Italy, living in Geneva for eighteen months where he studied French and learnt to paint. He desired to become an artist, but his father persuaded him to take a job in the architect's office of Frank Osborn in Birmingham, beginning working there in 1897. His time there did now inspire him creativity, as he had already turned his focus to writing and performing plays with a group of his friends.

Along with his friends they christened the company, The Pilgrim Players. This was to be the amateur foundations for the future Birmingham Repertory Theatre Company. Jackson alongside his friends, John Drinkwater, H S Milligan and C. R. Dawes had been performing their own productions at the Jackson's family home of the Grange in Moseley, from around 1902 to family and friends. Their first public appearance took place on 2 October 1907 at the Mission Hall in Inge Street.

The following year performances moved to the Edgbaston Assembly Rooms. The company was increasingly gaining in reputation and popularity in the city. Jackson was confident in the potential that the dedicated company possessed. He employed Drinkwater as the company Secretary from 1909, and from 1911, all of the Players were paid. At the start of 1912, Jackson began to identify and develop plans to build a permanent theatre for the expanding company. He had clear ideas about the design which he discussed with the architect S. N. Cooke, who had studied with Jackson at the School of Art.

== Birmingham Repertory Theatre ==
In 1913 Jackson officially founded the Birmingham Repertory Company and after just four months building work (which took place day and night), on 15 February 1913, Jackson opened the Birmingham Repertory Theatre on Station Street, when it opened it became the first purpose built repertory theatre in the world.

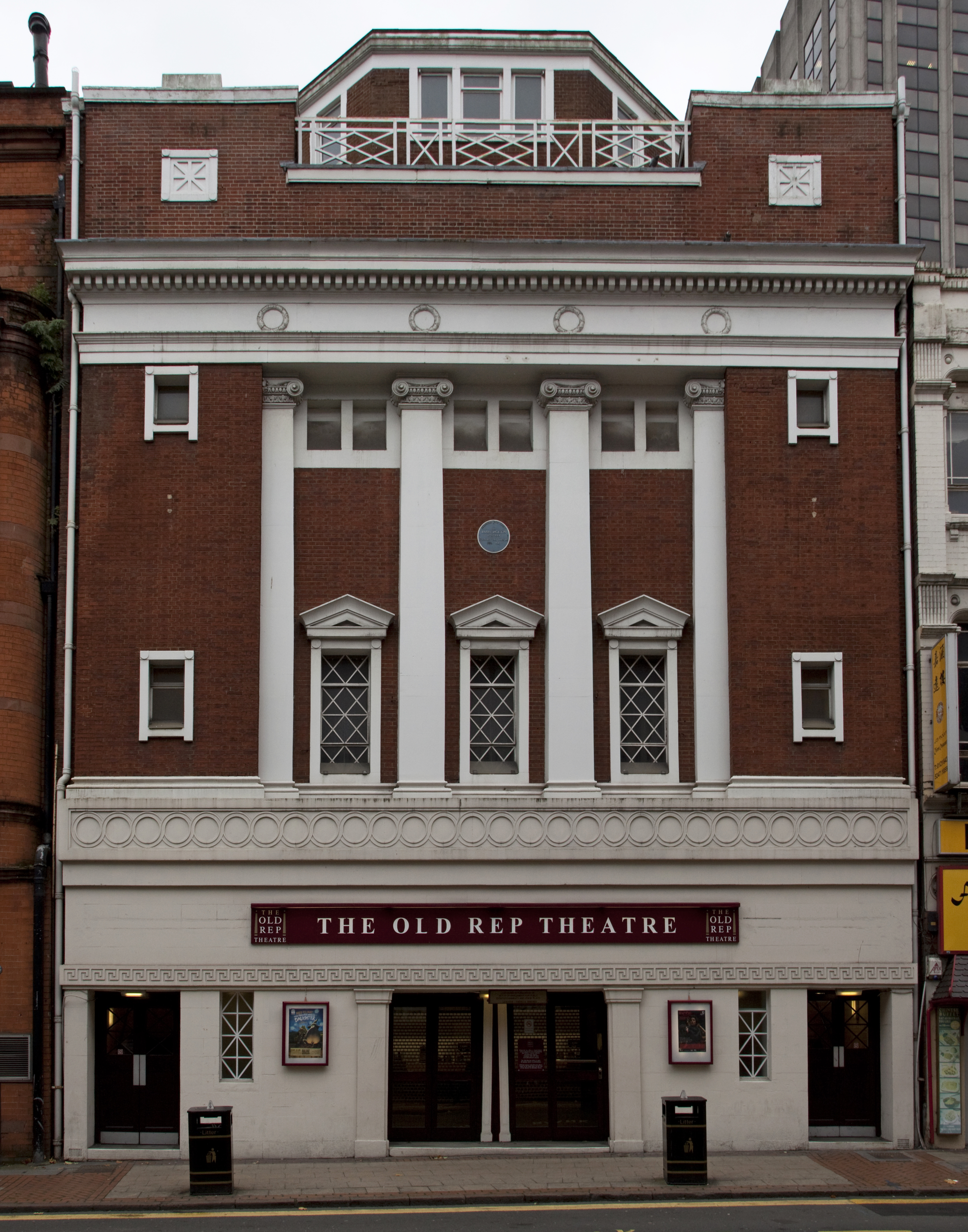
The Old Rep The original Birmingham Rep (1913–1971)

The theatre rapidly became home to one of the most famous repertory theatre companies in the country with the repertoire ranging from modern Shakespeare, medieval moralities, Greek drama and modern experimental drama, as well as presenting many world premieres including George Bernard Shaw's epic Back to Methuselah in 1923.

Jackson had an exceptional eye for young talent, later employing many young actors who later went on to become stars in their own right. Some of the early names included; Laurence Olivier, Peggy Ashcroft, Edith Evans, Stewart Granger and Ralph Richardson all gaining valuable early experience with the then thriving repertory system. He toured plays to the city's parks, established a theatre school and made Birmingham Repertory Theatre one of the most renowned theatres in the world. Their productions were aired on BBC radio, and a few, in 1938, by the early BBC television service.

As the theatre's reputation grew more talent was to develop on its stage with the likes of Paul Scofield, Julie Christie, Albert Finney and Derek Jacobi. Peter Brook directed at the Rep just after World War II and transferred with Sir Barry and Paul Scofield to Stratford.

As well as being the founder and Governing Director of the Birmingham Repertory Theatre, he was also a director of the Royal Opera House in London. From 1929, he gave his support to the Montreal Repertory Theatre and worked closely with Martha Allan promoting Canadian theatre. From 1933, the Sir Barry Jackson Trophy was awarded to the best Canadian play staged at the Dominion Drama Festival.

Jackson returned to Birmingham Repertory Theatre in 1948, but retired from running the company.

== The Malvern Festival ==
The now knighted, Jackson purchased a home at Blackhill in the Malverns in 1929, due to the relaxing and inspiring atmosphere. From 1929 to 1937, he joined forces with the Malvern Theatre manager, Roy Limbert to put on an annual summer festival. After coming to Birmingham to see Heartbreak House, George Bernard Shaw struck up a friendship with Jackson and consequently wrote The Apple Cart for the festival's first season. Initially the festival was primarily to showcase the work of Shaw, however the two of them soon began to develop the festival into what it remains to this day. Correspondence between the two is now held in Birmingham City Archives.

Jackson in 1922

The actors and production staff who toured at Malvern from Birmingham found the setting and the work enjoyable and worthwhile. The festivals, however, were costly and were not, in Jackson's opinion, received gratefully by the people of Malvern.

He directed the Malvern Summer Festivals from 1929 to 1937 and was Director of the Shakespeare Memorial Theatre in Stratford-upon-Avon in 1946–48. He was awarded the Freedom of the City of Birmingham on 16 April 1955.

Many plays transferred to London or toured. In 1932 Jackson was supporting four companies and told Shaw he had spent thousands supporting the theatre, calling it more fun than running a yacht.

== Shakespeare Memorial Theatre ==
In 1945, Jackson was appointed as artistic director at the Shakespeare Memorial Theatre. His appointment was welcomed by the press and a period of reform was anticipated. The Theatre had been neglected during the war and was worn and shabby. His aim was to transform the theatre into one of national and international status. However, it was a difficult undertaking. His relationship with the chairman of the governors, Fordham Flower, was uneasy from the start as Jackson insisted in bringing in his own staff and using a completely new company of actors. This alienated some previously loyal supporters within Stratford.

Undeterred, Jackson followed his plan to produce eight plays staggered throughout the season, each directed by a guest director. The hit of the first season in 1946 was Love's Labour's Lost, directed by Peter Brook and starring Paul Scofield as Armado. However, despite critical success the season culminated in the largest financial deficit the Memorial Theatre had ever experienced. Whilst this did not faze Jackson, the governors used it as a further reason to question his methods. But, despite their protests his contract was extended to three years, this demonstrated a recognition that in order to establish real change he needed more time.

The 1947 season included Brook's Romeo and Juliet and Benthall's The Merchant of Venice. Neither received much praise from the critics and the governors' patience was tested again. This culminated in Jackson's dramatic announcement of his retirement in January 1948. The governors did nothing to prevent his departure and had already decided on his successor, Anthony Quayle. However, in three years Jackson had done much to restore the fortunes and reputation of the Theatre.

== Later years ==
Throughout the late 1950s plans were developed for a new theatre building in Birmingham and in 1960 the City Council and the Arts Council agreed funding would be provided.

In 1960, Jackson's health began to deteriorate as a result of leukaemia. He spent time between the hospital in Birmingham, his home in Malvern and his office at the theatre. The final play he saw was "Antony and Cleopatra" at the Birmingham Repertory Theatre, but he was unable to stay longer than the first intermission. He did not live to see the new Rep on Broad Street, which opened in 1971.

After a long period of severe illness, Sir Barry Jackson died 3 April 1961, at the Queen Elizabeth Hospital in Birmingham, aged 81.

== Legacy ==
A bust of Jackson now stands in the Birmingham REP. Jackson was gay and the partner of Scott Sunderland.

Letters written by Jackson and other materials are held at the University of Birmingham Special Collections and at Birmingham Central Library Archives.

There is a tower block named in his honour: Barry Jackson Tower in Aston, Birmingham.

There is a commemorative plaque to Jackson, set into a rock at Wynds Point, which is near British Camp in the Malvern Hills

Jackson donated artworks to Birmingham Museum and Art Gallery.

== Honours ==
- Birmingham Civic Society Gold Medal, 1922
- Honorary MA (Birmingham), 1922
- Knighted, 1925 Birthday Honours for services to theatre
- Sir Barry Jackson Trophy awarded at the Dominion Drama Festival, 1933
- Honorary LL.D (St. Andrews), 1937
- Honorary D.Litt (Birmingham), 1950
- Freedom of the City of Birmingham, 1955
