= Interlude of Youth =

16th century morality play

The Interlude of Youth is an English 16th-century morality play. It is one of the earliest printed morality plays to have survived. Only two or three copies of any edition are known to exist. Waley's edition of the work appeared probably about the year 1554, and has a woodcut on the title-page of two figures, representing Charity and Youth, two of the characters in the interlude. Another edition was printed by William Copland, and has also a woodcut on the title-page, representing Youth between Charity, and another figure which has no name over its head. The colophon is: "Imprinted at London, in Lothbury, over against Sainct Margarytes church, by me, Wyllyam Copland." A fragment of a black-letter copy of the interlude has survived at Lambeth Palace.
