= History of socialism =

The history of socialism has its origins in the Age of Enlightenment and the French Revolution, along with their aftermaths, although it has precedents in earlier movements and ideas. The Communist Manifesto was written by Karl Marx and Friedrich Engels in 1847-1848 just before the Revolutions of 1848 swept Europe, expressing what they termed scientific socialism. In the last third of the 19th century, parties dedicated to democratic socialism arose in Europe, drawing mainly from Marxism. In 1848, Louis Blanc became the first socialist in any country to hold a governmental position; serving in the Provisional Government formed in France that year. The Australian Labor Party was the first elected socialist party when it formed government in the Colony of Queensland for a week in 1899. In Denmark, Italy and France by 1903, socialists had (as noted by one study) "inspired and dominated the Government" and in all three countries "very remarkable experiments in Socialistic legislation and administration have been initiated."

In the first half of the 20th century, the Soviet Union and the communist parties of the Third International around the world came to represent socialism in terms of the Soviet model of economic development and the creation of centrally planned economies directed by a state that owns all the means of production; other voices in the movement condemned what they saw as the lack of democracy. The establishment of the People's Republic of China in 1949 saw socialism take hold within a world power. China experienced land redistribution and the Anti-Rightist Movement, followed by the disastrous Great Leap Forward. In the UK, Herbert Morrison said that "socialism is what the Labour government does", whereas Aneurin Bevan argued socialism requires that the "main streams of economic activity are brought under public direction", with an economic plan and workers' democracy. Socialist governments established mixed economies with partial nationalisations and social welfare.

By 1968, the prolonged Vietnam War gave rise to the New Left, featuring socialists who tended to be critical of the Soviet Union and social democracy. Anarcho-syndicalists and some elements of the New Left and others favoured decentralised, collective ownership in the form of cooperatives or workers' councils. In 1989, the Soviet Union saw the end of communism, marked by the Revolutions of 1989 across Eastern Europe, culminating in the dissolution of the Soviet Union in 1991.

Socialists have adopted the causes of other social movements such as environmentalism, feminism and progressivism. At the turn of the 21st century, Latin America saw a pink tide, which championed socialism of the 21st century; it included a policy of nationalisation of major national assets, anti-imperialism, left-wing populism, and a rejection of the Washington Consensus and the neoliberal paradigm. It was first led by Venezuelan president Hugo Chávez.

== Origins of socialism ==
=== In antiquity ===
Ideas and political traditions that are conceptually related to modern socialism have their origins in antiquity and the Middle Ages. Ancient Egypt had a strong, unified, theocratic state which, along with its temple system employed peasants in massive labor projects and owned key parts of the economy, such as the granaries which dispensed grain to the public in hard times. This system of government is sometimes referred to as "theocratic socialism", though it is important to distinguish between this ideology and the Marxist theory of socialism.

In Ancient Greece, while private property was an acknowledged part of society with the basic element of Greek economic and social life being the privately owned estate or oikos, it was still understood that the needs of the city or polis always came before those of the individual property owner and his family. Ancient Greeks were also encouraged by their custom of koinonia to voluntarily share their wealth and property with other citizens, forgive the debts of debtors, serve in roles as public servants without pay, and participate in other pro-social actions. This idea of koinonia could express itself in different ways throughout Ancient Greece from the communal oligarchy of Sparta to Tarentum where the poor could access any property held in common. Another Ancient Greek custom, the leitourgia resulted in the richest members of the community directly financing the state. By the late fifth century BC, more radical concepts of communal ownership became expounded in Greece. Possibly in reply to this, Aristophanes wrote his early 4th-century play, Ecclesiazusae, which parodies communist, egalitarian, and gynocratic concepts that were already familiar in Classical Athens. In the play, Athenian women are depicted as seizing control of the Athenian government and banning all private property. As the character Praxagora puts it "I shall begin by making land, money, everything that is private property, common to all." Plato later wrote his Republic which argues for the common distribution of property between the upper elite in society who are, similar to Sparta, to live communally.

=== In Ancient India ===
The economy of the 3rd century BCE Mauryan Empire of India, under the rulership of its first emperor Chandragupta, who was assisted by his economic and political advisor Kautilya, has been described as," a socialized monarchy", "a sort of state socialism", and the world's first welfare state. Under the Mauryan system there was no private ownership of land as all land was owned by the king to whom tribute was paid by the Shudras, or laboring class. In return the emperor supplied the laborers with agricultural products, animals, seeds, tools, public infrastructure, and stored food in reserve for times of crisis.

=== In Ancient Rome ===
Tiberius Gracchus and Gaius Gracchus, two political reformers of Ancient Rome who were known for their measures on behalf of ordinary Romans such as land redistribution under the former and subsidized grain, public works (such as transport links of benefit to farmers), publicly provided soldiers’ clothing, agricultural colonies, and reductions in fixed rents and taxes under the latter, have been associated with socialism; with one observer going as far to describe the latter reformer, Gaius Gracchus, as “the original socialist and agrarian.” In the Eighteenth Century, the French radical writer François-Noël Babeuf adopted the pen name Gracchus as a reference to Gaius Gracchus.

=== In ancient religious communities ===
Forms of socialism were practised by various faith communities in antiquity. According to one observer, under the Hebrew theocracy, "the law by its institutions defended the fatherless, the hireling, the stranger, the poor, the oppressed, the widow." The religious sects of the Therapeutae and the Essenes lived in communities in which property was common, while early attempts at Communism are said to be found in the primitive churches and monastic institutions.

=== In indigenous communities ===
Historical and traditional practices of various indigenous groups like the Caribs and the inhabitants of the Aleutian Islands and the Friendly Islands, such as in common land ownership, the community of goods, and the division of food in times of need, have been associated with socialism. Thomas Paine drew inspiration from one such group, the North American Indians, when writing about the kind of society he believed in:

To understand what the state of society ought to be, it is necessary to have some idea of the natural and primitive state of man; such as it is at this day among the Indians of North America. There is not, in that state, any of those spectacles of human misery which poverty and want present to our eyes in all the towns and streets of Europe.

The indigenous societies of the Haudenosaunee Confederacy are said to have practiced a form of socialism, with their social structure involving shared resources and the communal ownership of land. The Jesuit missions among the Guaraní have also been regarded as socialist by various observers.

=== In the Inca Empire ===
The Incas have been identified with socialism due to their empire's provision of communal land and emphasis on ensuring that the basic needs of people were met, although according to one study "The subsistence of commoners was provided by community distributional mechanisms that had predated the Incan state." According to one authority, “The dreams of socialists were made a reality in the system which grew up and flourished under the rule of Incas,” citing its provisions for the ill, old and young, while also providing for rest and recreation and a comfortable standard of living.

According to J.H. Standing, a socialist state “existed in prosperity” under the Incas for six centuries, with its people succeeding “in providing more than a sufficiency for all.”

During an Australian political conference in 1908, the leader of the social-democratic Australian Labor Party Chris Watson noted what he regarded as the socialist aspects of the Inca state:

When Pizarro descended on Peru it was an ideal Socialistic community, peace-loving and carrying out some of the reforms aimed at to-day. But Pizarro, with a very small following indeed, came down on Peru and conquered it. But he had weapons and training to back himself up with, and with a more handful of supporters he was able to subjugate a whole nation whose care for its poor and aged has not since been equalled by any other nation.

=== In the Persian and Islamic worlds ===
In Iran, Mazdak (died c. 524 or 528 CE), a priest and political reformer, preached and instituted a religiously based socialist or proto-socialist system in the Zoroastrian context of Sassanian Persia.

Abū Dharr al-Ghifārī (d. 652 CE), a companion of Muhammad, is credited by some scholars, such as Muhammad Sharqawi and Sami Ayad Hanna, as originating a form of Islamic socialism. He protested against the accumulation of wealth by the ruling class during Uthman's caliphate and urged the equitable redistribution of wealth. The first Muslim Caliph Abu Bakr introduced a guaranteed minimum standard of income, granting each man, woman and child ten dirhams annually—this was later increased to twenty dirhams.

A number of the reforms carried out under Khosrow I drew, according to one study, "comparisons to socialist principles."

=== In Enlightenment thought (17th century – 1800) ===
The basis for modern socialism primarily originates with the Age of Enlightenment and the accompanying rise of liberalism and the Industrial Revolution. The French philosophes such as Montesquieu, Voltaire, and Rousseau and other European intellectuals such as Adam Smith and Immanuel Kant criticized the traditional purview, policies, and character of governments, believing that through reform changes could be made that benefited all of society rather than just a privileged elite. These Enlightenment thinkers usually tempered their aims in relation to government intervention, proposing that government ought to be limited in its control of individuals, a belief typically associated with the contemporaneous laissez-faire economic system. Some thinkers believed differently such as the French writers Jean Meslier, Étienne-Gabriel Morelly, and Abbé de Mably who formulated schemes to solve the inequality in society through the redistribution of wealth and the abolition of private property. The French Enlightenment philosopher Marquis de Condorcet did not oppose the existence of private property, but did believe that the primary cause of suffering in society was the lower classes' lack of land and capital and therefore supported policies similar to the modern social safety net that could be used to protect the most vulnerable.

In response to the inequalities in the industrializing economy of late 18th century Britain pamphleteers and agitators such as Thomas Spence and Thomas Paine began to advocate for social reform. As early as the 1770s Spence called for the common ownership of land, democratically run decentralized government, and welfare support especially for mothers and children. His views were detailed in his self-published pamphlets such as Property in Land Every One's Right in 1775 and The Meridian Sun in 1796. Thomas Paine proposed a detailed plan to tax property owners to pay for the needs of the poor in his pamphlet Agrarian Justice (1797). Due to their dedication to social equality and democracy, Condorcet and Paine can be seen as the predecessors of social democracy. Charles Hall wrote The Effects of Civilization on the People in European States (1805), denouncing capitalism's effects on the poor of his time.

=== French Revolution (1789–1799) ===
During the French Revolution, the working class sans-culottes had significant influence over the revolutionary government. Popular radical spokespeople of the sans-culottes, such as Jean-François Varlet, Théophile Leclerc, Pauline Léon, Claire Lacombe and Jacques Roux, advocated for a plethora of policies, such as a "maximum [for necessities]," and "a stringent law against speculators and hoarders." This group of revolutionaries would come to be known as the Enragés to their enemies, though could not be said to be an actual, cohesive faction.

As the Revolution progressed, the Enragés protested against the actions of the revolutionary government, while some of their supporters formed a radical feminist group known as the Society of Revolutionary Republican Women. On 25 June 1793, the day after the adoption of the Constitution of 1793, Jacques Roux addressed the National Convention in a speech later known as the Manifesto of the Enragés. He argued that political equality was meaningless without economic measures to protect the poor, demanding action against speculation, hoarding, and rising food prices.

However, during the Reign of Terror, the Enragés were suppressed, with Leclerc and Roux being expelled from the Cordeliers Club and the Society of Revolutionary Republican Women being shut down. Afterwards, Leclerc and Léon would retreat into obscurity, Lacombe would return to a career of acting, Varlet would be arrested, and Roux would commit suicide to avoid being sent to the Revolutionary Tribunal.

In the White Terror, activists and theorists like François-Noël Babeuf and Philippe Buonarroti spread egalitarian ideas that would later influence the early French labour and socialist movements. The views of Babeuf, Sylvain Maréchal, and Restif de la Bretonne specifically formed the basis for the emerging concepts of revolutionary socialism and modern communism. These social critics criticized the excesses of poverty and inequality of the Industrial Revolution, and advocated reforms such as the egalitarian distribution of wealth and the transformation of society into one where private property is abolished and the means of production are owned collectively.

Babeuf would eventually lead a conspiracy, along with Maréchal, Buonarroti, Augustin Alexandre Darthé, Jean Antoine Rossignol, and others, that would attempt to overthrow the Directory and install a radical, proto-socialist republic, which would become known as the Conspiracy of the Equals. This conspiracy spread propaganda and rallied support towards a possible anti-Directory revolution, demanding "the overthrow of the [Council of] Five Hundred and the [Directory], [the restoration] of the 1793 Constitution, and ultimately to achieve a general equality." However, this conspiracy was discovered by the Directory and its leaders were arrested. Babeuf and a number of his supporters were executed for their role in the conspiracy. Buonarroti would eventually become a historian and pen an account of the conspiracy he had helped create. The Conspiracy of the Equals would become the most infamous of proto-socialist thought and action, eventually being deemed by Marx and Engels as having been "[one of] the first [manifestations] of a truly active communist party."

== Early modern socialism (1800–1830s) ==
The first modern socialists were early 19th-century Western European social critics. In this period socialism emerged from a diverse array of doctrines and social experiments associated primarily with British and French thinkers—especially Thomas Spence, Charles Fourier, Saint-Simon, and Robert Owen. Outlining principles for the reorganisation of society along collectivist lines, Saint-Simon, Fourier, and Owen served as the primary advocates for what later became known as Utopian Socialism. The views of these original utopian socialist thinkers were not identical. For example, Saint-Simon and Fourier saw no need to abolish private property or adopt democratic principles, while Owen supported both democracy and collective ownership of property. Followers of the radical English labor agitator Thomas Spence, the Spenceans, were notable figures in the early British labor movement.

While Fourier and Owen sought to build socialism on the foundations of small, planned, utopian communities, Saint-Simon desired to enact change through a large scale initiative that put industrialists and experts in charge of society. Early-19th-century followers of the utopian theories of such thinkers as Owen, Saint-Simon and Fourier could use the terms co-operative, mutualist, associationist, societarian, phalansterian, agrarianist, and radical to describe their beliefs along with the later term socialist. The English word "socialist" in its modern sense relates to Owenite thought and dates from at least 1822. Robert Owen was considered the founder of socialism in England.

=== Henri de Saint-Simon ===
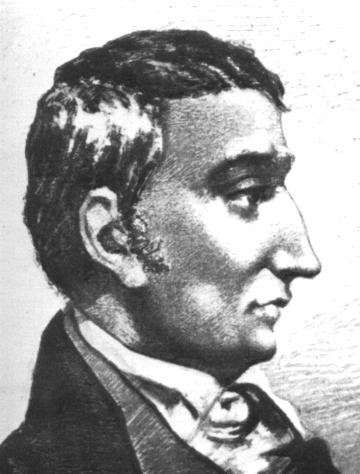
Claude Henri de Rouvroy, Comte de Saint-Simon, founder of French socialism

Claude Henri de Rouvroy, comte de Saint-Simon (1760–1825) was the founder of French socialism as well as modern theoretical socialism in general. As one of the founders of positivism along with his secretary Auguste Comte, Saint-Simon sought to impose upon political science the same level of empiricism and consistency as existed within the physical sciences. As early as 1803 in his work Letters from an inhabitant of Geneva he suggested the formation of a group of intellectual elites that would be used to resolve society's most pressing concerns. In his later 1817 work L'Industrie Saint-Simon envisioned a state that dedicated itself to the solving of all social problems through industrial management. In this new system, production and distribution were to be based on social need, while private property was to be subordinated to the needs of society as a whole. Saint-Simon categorized society into two general classes, the workers, comprising wage laborers, manufacturers, scientists, engineers, scholars, bankers, merchants and anyone else who contributed to production and distribution, and the idlers such as land owners, rentiers, the military, the nobility, and the clergy, who made no material contributions to the economy.

Abandoning economic liberalism, he instead propounded a system which would replace the traditional state with a brotherhood of man that incorporated industry and society into a single centralized organization. In this new society all people would have equal opportunity within a meritocratic order, ignoring traditional class divisions based on nobility and wealth. Saint-Simon, influenced by earlier French thinkers like Condorcet, believed in a materialist interpretation of history, similar to the later Marxist historical materialism, which could be used to predict future developments, and wherein the economic condition of civilization is determined by the level of technology, with the three general epochs being slavery, serfdom, and finally the proletariat or wage labor. Saint-Simon did not see the working class or proletariat as crucial to change, but instead believed that manufacturers, bankers, artists, scholars, and other educated people would transform society into one where humans made the best possible use of nature and the government was chiefly concerned with the proper administration of material goods and services. Notably, Saint-Simon never fully condemned or repudiated private property as an institution. In his final work Le Nouveau Christianism in 1825 he outlined his belief that his political theories were based on Christian principles and that his system embodied certain Christian ideals such as love for others and selflessness.

After Saint-Simon's death in 1825 his followers, known as the Saint-Simonians, continued to spread and develop his teachings, initiating the widespread use of the terms "socialism", "socialize", "socialization", and "socializing the instruments of labor". His followers, led by Amand Bazard and Barthélemy Enfantin, began to trend more towards radicalism than Saint-Simon becoming increasingly critical of private property while demanding the emancipation of women. The Saint-Simonian book Exposition de la doctrine de Saint-Simon, published in two volumes from 1828 to 1830 and featuring condensed speeches by Bazard and Enfantin, proved to be a landmark in socialist theory. The Saint-Simonians rejected communist style proposals for a system that would abolish private property and institute a 'community of goods' which they considered an act of, "reprehensible violence" which violated, "the first of all moral laws". However, according to their address to the French Chamber of Deputies in 1830, Bazard and Enfantin still maintained there should be collective ownership of all," instruments of labor, land, and capital" and that noble privileges and inheritance ought to be abolished so that all hierarchy and reward in society is based on an individual's merit, capacity, and effort alone. Bazard and Enfantin believed that history could be summed up as the historical changes in the forms of class exploitation and that private ownership of the means of production must be gradually abolished. Because of their emphasis on labor they summed up their socialist program with principle "To each according to his ability and to each ability according to its work." They also introduced the idea that class antagonism between the workers and owners came from the dispute over possession of the instruments of labor. From 1830 onward the Saint-Simonians began to refer to the opposition between the bourgeoise and the proletariat. Beginning in 1832 Bazard and Enfantin began to emphasize the term "socialism" as the word that best represented their system. According to John Stuart Mill writing in 1848 the Saint-Simonians had," sowed the seeds of all the socialist tendencies."

=== Charles Fourier ===
François Marie Charles Fourier (1772–1837) was a French utopian socialist and philosopher. Modern scholars credit Fourier with having originated the word féminisme in 1837. As early as 1808, he had argued in the Theory of the Four Movements that the extension of the liberty of women was the general principle of all social progress, though he disdained any attachment to a discourse of "equal rights". Fourier inspired the founding of the communist community called La Reunion near present-day Dallas, Texas as well as several other communities within the United States, such as the North American Phalanx in New Jersey and Community Place and five others in New York State. Fourierism manifested itself "in the middle of the 19th century (where) literally hundreds of communes (phalansteries) were founded on fourierist principles in France, N. America, Mexico, S. America, Algeria, Yugoslavia, etc".

=== Robert Owen ===
Robert Owen (1771–1858) advocated the transformation of society into small, local collectives without such elaborate systems of social organisation. Owen managed mills for many years. He transformed life in the village of New Lanark with ideas and opportunities which were at least a hundred years ahead of their time. Child labour and corporal punishment were abolished, and villagers were provided with decent homes, schools and evening classes, free health-care, and affordable food. Owen is considered "the father of the cooperative movement".

The UK government's Factory Act 1833 attempted to reduce the hours adults and children worked in the textile industry. A fifteen-hour working day was to start at 5.30 a.m. and to cease at 8.30 p.m. Children of nine to thirteen years could work no more than 9 hours, and workers of a younger age were prohibited. There were, however, only four factory inspectors, and factory owners flouted this law. In the same year Owen stated: "Eight hours' daily labor is enough for any [adult] human being, and under proper arrangements sufficient to afford an ample supply of food, raiment and shelter, or the necessaries and comforts of life, and for the remainder of his time, every person is entitled to education, recreation and sleep."

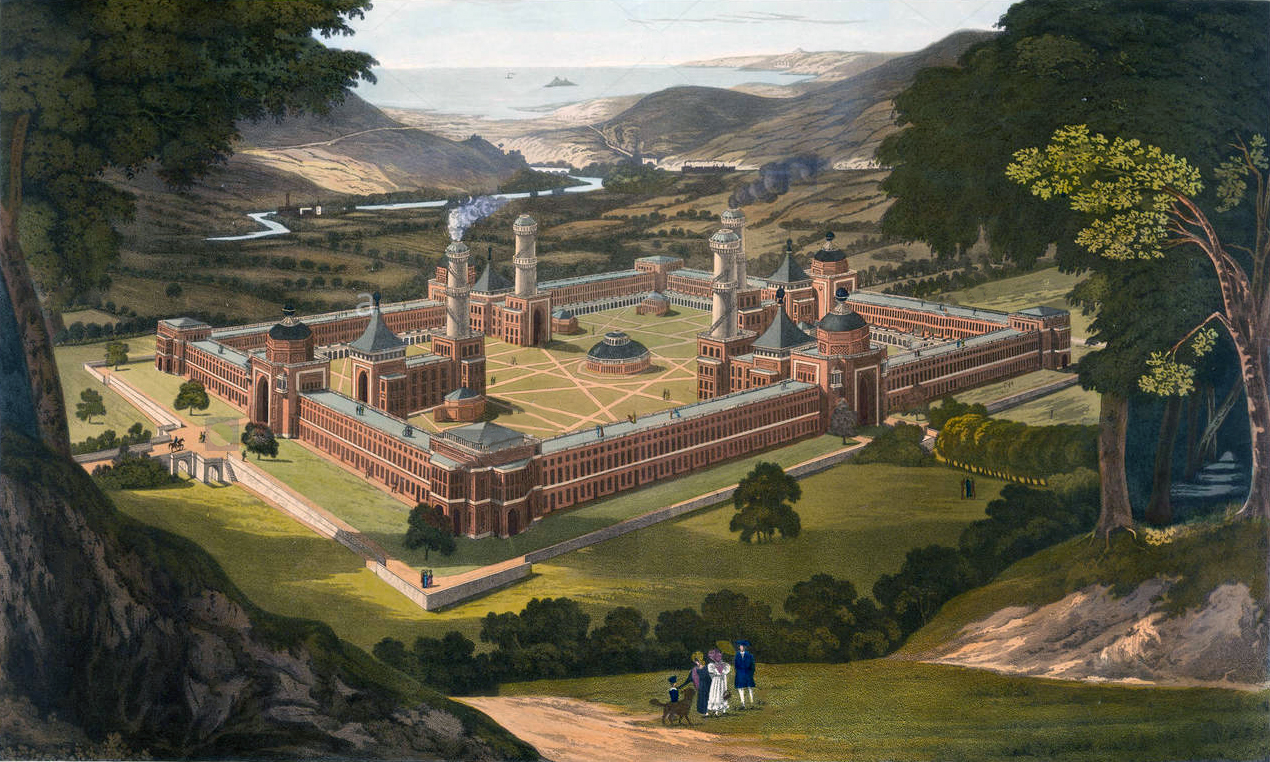
New Harmony, a utopian attempt as proposed by Robert Owen

Leaving England for the United States, Robert Owen and his sons began an experiment with a socialist community in New Harmony, Indiana in 1825. Advertisements announced the experiment for the cooperative colony, bringing various people to attempt an 8-hour work-day of which Owen was a proponent. The town banned money and other commodities for trade, using "labour tickets" denominated in the number of hours worked. Owen's son, Robert Dale Owen, would say of the failed socialism experiment that the people at New Harmony were "a heterogeneous collection of radicals, enthusiastic devotees to principle, honest latitudinarians, and lazy theorists, with a sprinkling of unprincipled sharpers thrown in". The larger community lasted only until 1827, at which time smaller communities were formed, which led to further subdivision, until individualism replaced socialism in 1828. New Harmony dissolved in 1829 due to constant quarrels as parcels of land and property were sold and returned to private use. In a Paper Dedicated to the Governments of Great Britain, Austria, Russia, France, Prussia and the United States of America written in 1841, Owen wrote: "The lowest stage of humanity is experienced when the individual must labour for a small pittance of wages from others".

American Josiah Warren (1798–1874, described by Slate magazine as "the first American anarchist thinker, and first individualist anarchist), who was one of the original participants in the New Harmony Society, saw the community as doomed to failure due to a lack of individual sovereignty and private property. In Periodical Letter II (1856), he wrote of the community: "It seemed that the difference of opinion, tastes and purposes increased just in proportion to the demand for conformity. Two years were worn out in this way; at the end of which, I believe that not more than three persons had the least hope of success. Most of the experimenters left in despair of all reforms, and conservatism felt itself confirmed. We had tried every conceivable form of organization and government. We had a world in miniature. --we had enacted the French revolution over again with despairing hearts instead of corpses as a result. ...It appeared that it was nature's own inherent law of diversity that had conquered us ...our 'united interests' were directly at war with the individualities of persons and circumstances and the instinct of self-preservation... and it was evident that just in proportion to the contact of persons or interests, so are concessions and compromises indispensable." The four-page weekly paper Warren edited during 1833, The Peaceful Revolutionist, was the first anarchist periodical published. Anarchist Peter Sabatini reports that in the United States in the early to mid-19th century, "there appeared an array of communal and 'utopian' counterculture groups (including the so-called free love movement). William Godwin's anarchism exerted an ideological influence on some of this, but more so the socialism of Robert Owen and Charles Fourier.

== Development of modern socialism (1830s–1850s) ==
In France, socialists thinkers and politicians such as Pierre-Joseph Proudhon and Louis Blanc continued spreading their egalitarian economic and social doctrines. While earlier socialists had emphasized the gradual transformation of society, most notably through the foundation of small, utopian communities, a growing number of socialists became disillusioned with the viability of this approach and instead emphasized direct political action. Early socialists were united in their desire for a society based on cooperation rather than competition. Proudhon's groundbreaking pamphlet "What is Property?" which declared that "Property is theft" was published in 1840. Louis Reybaud published Études sur les réformateurs contemporains ou socialistes modernes in 1842 in France. By 1842, socialism "had become the topic of a major academic analysis" by a German scholar, Lorenz von Stein, in his Socialism and Social Movement.

Chartism, which flourished from 1838 to 1858, "formed the first organised labour movement in Europe, gathering significant numbers around the People's Charter of 1838, which demanded the extension of suffrage to all male adults. Prominent leaders in the movement also called for a more equitable distribution of income and better living conditions for the working classes. The very first trade unions and consumers' cooperative societies also emerged in the hinterland of the Chartist movement, as a way of bolstering the fight for these demands". The word socialism first appeared on 13 February 1832 in Le Globe, a French Saint-Simonian newspaper founded by Pierre Leroux.

There were also currents inspired by dissident Christianity of Christian socialism "often in Britain and then usually coming out of left liberal politics and a romantic anti-industrialism", which produced theorists such as F.D. Maurice (the British founder of Christian socialism in the mid-19th century), Charles Kingsley (British novelist and socialist, 1860s), and Edward Bellamy (an American utopian socialist influential on the populist movement in the 1880s). Leroux, a Christian socialist, saw individualism as the primary moral sickness plaguing society. The French politician Philippe Buchez became the leader of the Christian socialist movement in France during the 1830s. In 1839 the socialist writer Louis Blanc wrote his first work on socialism, the treatise, La Organisation du Travail.

=== Pierre-Joseph Proudhon ===
Pierre-Joseph Proudhon (1809–1865) pronounced that "property is theft" and that socialism was "every aspiration towards the amelioration of society". Proudhon termed himself an anarchist and proposed that free association of individuals should replace the coercive state. Proudhon himself, Benjamin Tucker, and others developed these ideas in a mutualist direction, while Mikhail Bakunin (1814–1876), Peter Kropotkin (1842–1921), and others adapted Proudhon's ideas in a more conventionally socialist direction. In a letter to Marx in 1846, Proudhon wrote: "I myself put the problem in this way: to bring about the return to society, by an economic combination, of the wealth which was withdrawn from society by another economic combination. In other words, through Political Economy to turn the theory of Property against Property in such a way as to engender what you German socialists call community and what I will limit myself for the moment to calling liberty or equality."

For American anarchist historian Eunice Minette Schuster, "[i]t is apparent ... that Proudhonian Anarchism was to be found in the United States at least as early as 1848 and that it was not conscious of its affinity to the Individualist Anarchism of Josiah Warren and Stephen Pearl Andrews ... William B. Greene presented this Proudhonian Mutualism in its purest and most systematic form".

=== Mikhail Bakunin ===
Mikhail Bakunin (1814–1876), the father of modern anarchism, was a libertarian socialist, a theory by which the workers would directly manage the means of production through their own productive associations. There would be "equal means of subsistence, support, education, and opportunity for every child, boy or girl, until maturity, and equal resources and facilities in adulthood to create his own well-being by his own labour."

=== Alexander Herzen ===
Alexander Herzen was a Russian writer, revolutionary, and the first champion of socialism in Russia. His writings contributed to the abolition of serfdom in Russia under Alexander II, and he later became known as the "Father of Russian socialism". Herzen initiated the belief that socialism would eventually take hold in Russia using the traditional rural Russian communal villages or mir as a basis for its propagation. Influenced by Hegel, he believed that only through revolution could the dialectic be accelerated to bring about socialism, he translated many socialist books into Russian so they could be accessible to Russian speakers and financially supported Proudhon's publications.

== Etymology and terminology (c. 19th century–20th century) ==
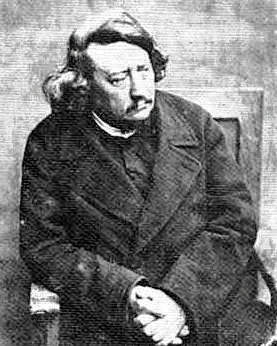
Pierre Leroux founder of the Parisian newspaper Le Globe in which the term socialism first appeared

While the use of the term socialism was initially adopted to describe the philosophy of the Saint-Simonians, which advocated the socialized ownership of the means of production, the term was quickly appropriated by working class movements in the 1840s, and in the 19th century the term socialism came to encompass a wide and diverse range of economic policies and doctrines which could include any view from generic opposition against laissez-faire capitalism to the systematic communism of classical Marxism and anything in between. In general a view could be deemed as socialism or socialistic if it advocated for the government to take action that would benefit the lower classes and ameliorate economic and social problems in society. According to Sheldon Richman, "[i]n the 19th and early 20th centuries, 'socialism' did not exclusively mean collective or government ownership of the means of production but was an umbrella term for anyone who believed labour was cheated out of its natural product under historical capitalism."

- Pierre Leroux who claimed priority in coining the word socialism presented his definition of the term as "a political organization in which the individual is sacrificed to society", stating he had intended to create a term that would directly oppose the term "individualism".
- French philosopher Émile Littré defined socialism in 1859 as only a general sentiment that society ought to be improved, claiming it otherwise was without any set doctrine, instead being only a tendency to modify and improve society with the involvement of the working class. In a later dictionary, Littré defined it merely as a system which "offers a plan of social reform."
- French philosopher Paul Janet, defined socialism as "every doctrine that teaches that the state has a right to correct the inequality of wealth which exists among men.
- In his summation of socialism the 19th-century, Belgian economist Émile Laveleye stated that "socialistic doctrine aims at introducing greater equality in social conditions, and...realizing those reforms by law."
- Pierre-Joseph Proudhon concisely defined socialism as "every aspiration towards the improvement of society."
- German economist Adolf Held claimed in 1877 that any view was socialistic if it exhibited a "tendency which demands the subordination of the individual will to the community."
- Writing in 1887, English historian of socialist thought Thomas Kirkup defined socialism, as it was generally conceived of at the time as, "the systematic interference of the state in favour of the suffering classes", and "the use of public resources on behalf of the poor."
- Preeminent French sociologist Emile Durkheim recognized in his late 19th century study on Saint-Simon any theory as socialism if it demanded that the "directing and knowing organs of society" be connected with its economic functions.
- In his 1904 book Die Frau und der Sozialismus, German socialist politician August Bebel defined socialism as "science applied with clear consciousness and full knowledge to every sphere of human activity."
- Published in 1911, the Encyclopædia Britannica Eleventh Edition defined socialism as "that policy or theory which aims at securing...a better distribution and...a better production of wealth than now prevails."

Prior to the Revolutions of 1848, communism and socialism had differing religious implications with socialism being seen as secular and atheistic and communism being seen as religious, leading to Owen preferring the term socialism. In 1830, the two leaders of socialist group the Saint-Simonians, Amand Bazard and Barthélemy Enfantin, denounced communism to the French Chamber of Deputies. Because the Saint-Simonians still advocated the socialization of the means of production, just not all private property, this established an important early distinction between their school of socialism and the communism of rival political groups such as the Neo-Babouvists.

According to Friedrich Engels, by 1847 socialism, such as that of the Owenites and Fourierists, was considered a respectable, middle-class, or bourgeoise movement on the continent of Europe, while communism was considered a less respectable working-class movement associated with organizations such as those led by Wilhelm Weitling and Étienne Cabet. It was on this basis of appealing to a broad working class movement that Marx and Engels chose the term communist for their Communist Manifesto of 1848. Despite this initial preference, the use of the term communism was sparse from the 1860s onward, possibly due to its association with militancy in France and Germany, and instead the terms socialism or social democratic became preferred even by followers of the Marxist tradition. Socialism was the word predominantly used by Marxists up until World War I and the Bolshevik Revolution, at which time Vladimir Lenin made the conscious decision to replace the term socialism with communism, renaming the Russian Social Democratic Labor Party to the All-Russian Communist Party.

== Marxism and the socialist movement (1850s–1910s) ==
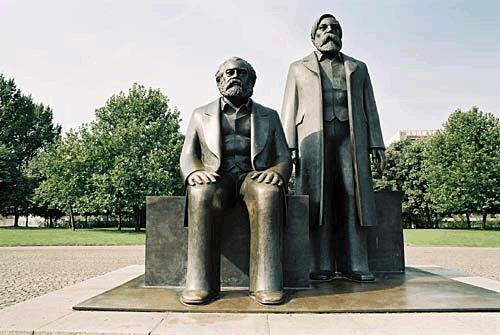
Statue of Karl Marx and Friedrich Engels in Alexanderplatz, Berlin

"The French Revolution of 1789," Karl Marx (1818–1883) and Frederick Engels (1820–1895) wrote, "abolished feudal property in favour of bourgeois property". The French Revolution was preceded and influenced by the works of Jean-Jacques Rousseau, whose Social Contract famously began: "Man is born free, and he is everywhere in chains". Rousseau is credited with influencing socialist thought, but it was François-Noël Babeuf, and his Conspiracy of Equals, who is credited with providing a model for left-wing and communist movements of the 19th century.

Marx and Engels drew from these socialist or communist ideas born in the French revolution, as well as from the German philosophy of Georg Wilhelm Friedrich Hegel, and British political economy, particularly that of Adam Smith and David Ricardo. Marx and Engels developed a body of ideas which they called scientific socialism, more commonly called Marxism. Marxism comprised a theory of history (historical materialism), a critique of political economy, as well as a political, and philosophical theory.

In the Manifesto of the Communist Party, written in 1848 just days before the outbreak of the revolutions of 1848, Marx and Engels wrote, "The distinguishing feature of Communism is not the abolition of property generally, but the abolition of bourgeois property". Unlike those Marx described as utopian socialists, Marx determined that "[t]he history of all hitherto existing society is the history of class struggles". While utopian socialists believed it was possible to work within or reform capitalist society, Marx confronted the question of the economic and political power of the capitalist class, expressed in their ownership of the means of producing wealth (factories, banks, commerce – in a word, "Capital"). Marx and Engels formulated theories regarding the practical way of achieving and running a socialist system, which they saw as only being achieved by those who produce the wealth in society, the toilers, workers or "proletariat", gaining common ownership of their workplaces, the means of producing wealth.

Marx believed that capitalism could only be overthrown by means of a revolution carried out by the working class: "The proletarian movement is the self-conscious, independent movement of the immense majority, in the interest of the immense majority." Marx believed that the proletariat was the only class with both the cohesion, the means and the determination to carry the revolution forward. Unlike the utopian socialists, who often idealised agrarian life and deplored the growth of modern industry, Marx saw the growth of capitalism and an urban proletariat as a necessary stage towards socialism.

For Marxists, socialism or, as Marx termed it, the first phase of communist society, can be viewed as a transitional stage characterised by common or state ownership of the means of production under democratic workers' control and management, which Engels argued was beginning to be realised in the Paris Commune of 1871, before it was overthrown. Socialism to them is simply the transitional phase between capitalism and "higher phase of communist society". Because this society has characteristics of both its capitalist ancestor and is beginning to show the properties of communism, it will hold the means of production collectively but distributes commodities according to individual contribution. When the socialist state (the dictatorship of the proletariat) naturally withers away, what will remain is a society in which human beings no longer suffer from alienation and "all the springs of co-operative wealth flow more abundantly". Here "society inscribe[s] on its banners: From each according to his ability, to each according to his needs!" For Marx, a communist society entails the absence of differing social classes and thus the end of class warfare. According to Marx and Engels, once a socialist society had been ushered in, the state would begin to "wither away" and humanity would be in control of its own destiny for the first time.

=== Anarchism ===
Anarchism as a social movement has regularly endured fluctuations in popularity. Its classical period, which scholars demarcate as from 1860 to 1939, is associated with the working-class movements of the 19th century and the Spanish Civil War-era struggles against fascism.

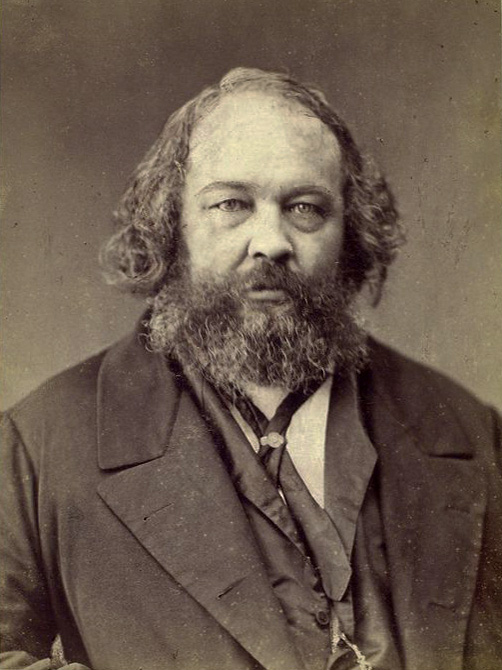
Russian anarchist Mikhail Bakunin opposed the Marxist aim of dictatorship of the proletariat in favour of universal rebellion and allied himself with the federalists in the First International before his expulsion by the Marxists

In 1864 the International Workingmen's Association (sometimes called the "First International") united diverse revolutionary currents including French followers of Proudhon, Blanquists, Philadelphes, English trade unionists, socialists and social democrats. Proudhon's followers, the mutualists, opposed Marx's state socialism, advocating political abstentionism and small property holdings. The anti-authoritarian sections of the First International were the precursors of the anarcho-syndicalists, seeking to "replace the privilege and authority of the State" with the "free and spontaneous organisation of labour".

In 1907, the International Anarchist Congress of Amsterdam gathered delegates from 14 countries, among which important figures of the anarchist movement, including Errico Malatesta, Pierre Monatte, Luigi Fabbri, Benoît Broutchoux, Emma Goldman, Rudolf Rocker, and Christiaan Cornelissen. Various themes were treated during the Congress, in particular concerning the organisation of the anarchist movement, popular education issues, the general strike or antimilitarism. A central debate concerned the relation between anarchism and syndicalism (or trade unionism). The Federación Obrera Regional Española (Workers' Federation of the Spanish Region) in 1881 was the first major anarcho-syndicalist movement; anarchist trade union federations were of special importance in Spain. The most successful was the Confederación Nacional del Trabajo (National Confederation of Labour: CNT), founded in 1910. Before the 1940s, the CNT was the major force in Spanish working class politics, attracting 1.58 million members at one point and playing a major role in the Spanish Civil War. The CNT was affiliated with the International Workers Association, a federation of anarcho-syndicalist trade unions founded in 1922, with delegates representing two million workers from 15 countries in Europe and Latin America. Federación Anarquista Ibérica.

Some anarchists, such as Johann Most, advocated publicising violent acts of retaliation against counter-revolutionaries because "we preach not only action in and for itself, but also action as propaganda." Numerous heads of state were assassinated between 1881 and 1914 by members of the anarchist movement. U.S. president William McKinley's assassin Leon Czolgosz claimed to have been influenced by anarchist and feminist Emma Goldman.

=== First International ===
In Europe, harsh reaction followed the revolutions of 1848, during which ten countries had experienced brief or long-term social upheaval as groups carried out nationalist uprisings. After most of these attempts at systematic change ended in failure, conservative elements took advantage of the divided groups of socialists, anarchists, liberals, and nationalists, to prevent further revolt. The International Workingmen's Association (IWA), also known as the First International, was founded in London in 1864. Victor Le Lubez, a French radical republican living in London, invited Karl Marx to come to London as a representative of German workers. The IWA held a preliminary conference in 1865, and had its first congress at Geneva in 1866. Marx was appointed a member of the committee, and according to Saul Padover, Marx and Johann Georg Eccarius, a tailor living in London, became "the two mainstays of the International from its inception to its end". The First International became the first major international forum for the promulgation of socialist ideas, uniting diverse revolutionary currents including French followers of Proudhon, Blanquists, Philadelphes, English trade unionists, socialists and social democrats.

In 1868, following their unsuccessful participation in the League of Peace and Freedom (LPF), Russian revolutionary Mikhail Bakunin and his collectivist anarchist associates joined the First International (which had decided not to get involved with the LPF). They allied themselves with the federalist socialist sections of the International, who advocated the revolutionary overthrow of the state and the collectivisation of property.

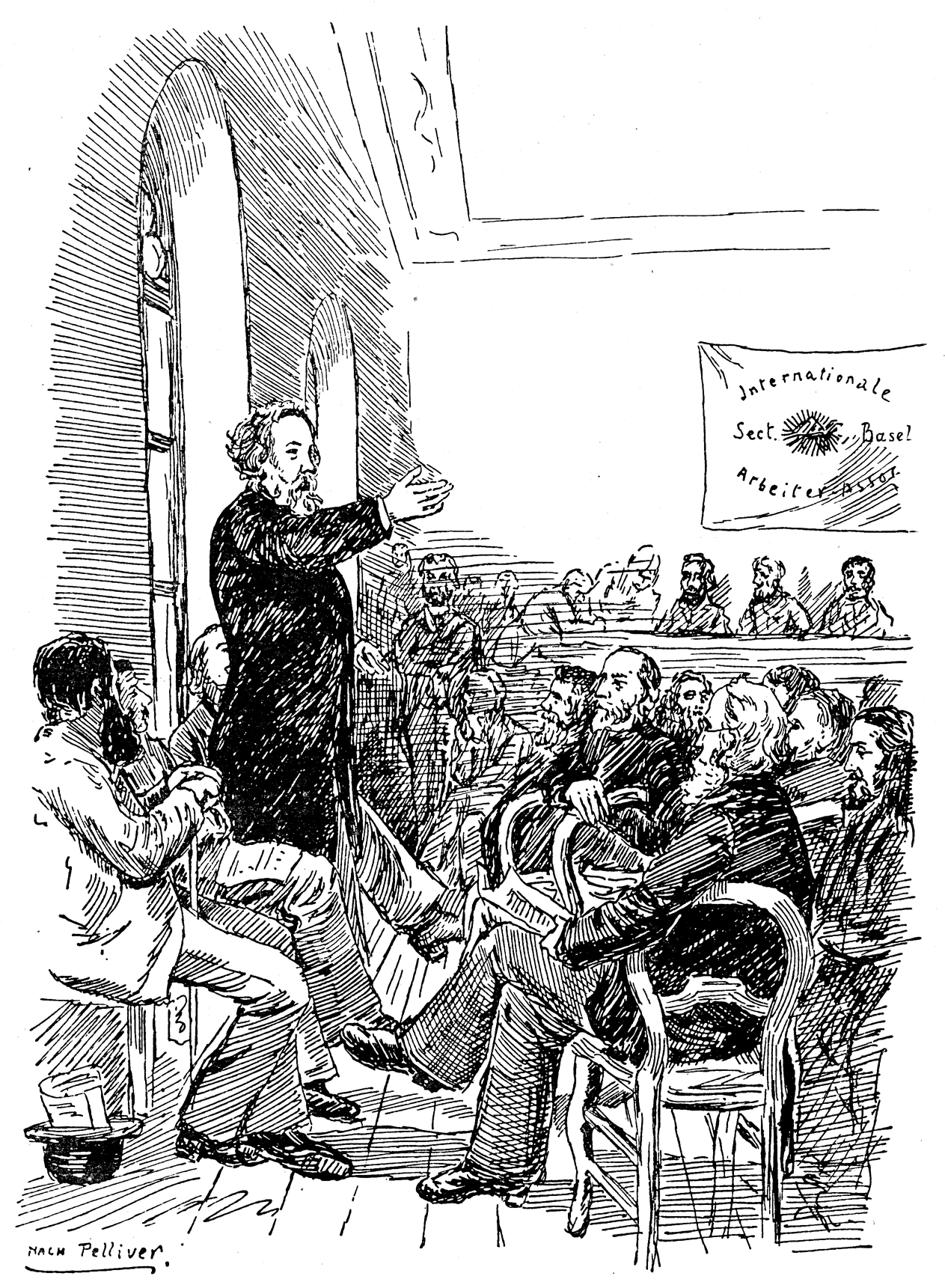
Mikhail Bakunin speaking to members of the IWA at the Basel Congress in 1869

The Social Democratic Workers' Party of Germany was founded in 1869 under the influence of Marx and Engels. In 1875, it merged with the General German Workers' Association of Ferdinand Lassalle to become what is known today as the German Social Democratic Party (SPD). Socialism became increasingly associated with newly formed trade unions. In Germany, the SPD founded unions. In Austria, France and other European countries, socialist parties and anarchists played a prominent role in forming and building up trade unions, especially from the 1870s onwards. This stood in contrast to the British experience, where moderate New Model Unions dominated the union movement from the mid-nineteenth century, and where trade unionism was stronger than the political labour movement until the formation and growth of the Labour Party in the early twentieth century.

At first, the collectivists worked with the Marxists to push the First International in a more revolutionary socialist direction. Subsequently, the International became polarised into two camps, with Marx and Bakunin as their respective figureheads. Bakunin characterised Marx's ideas as centralist and predicted that, if a Marxist party came to power, its leaders would simply take the place of the ruling class they had fought against. In 1872, the conflict climaxed with a final split between the two groups at the Hague Congress, where Bakunin and James Guillaume were expelled from the International and its headquarters were transferred to New York. In response, the federalist sections formed their own International at the 1872 St. Imier Congress, adopting a revolutionary anarchist program.

=== Paris Commune ===
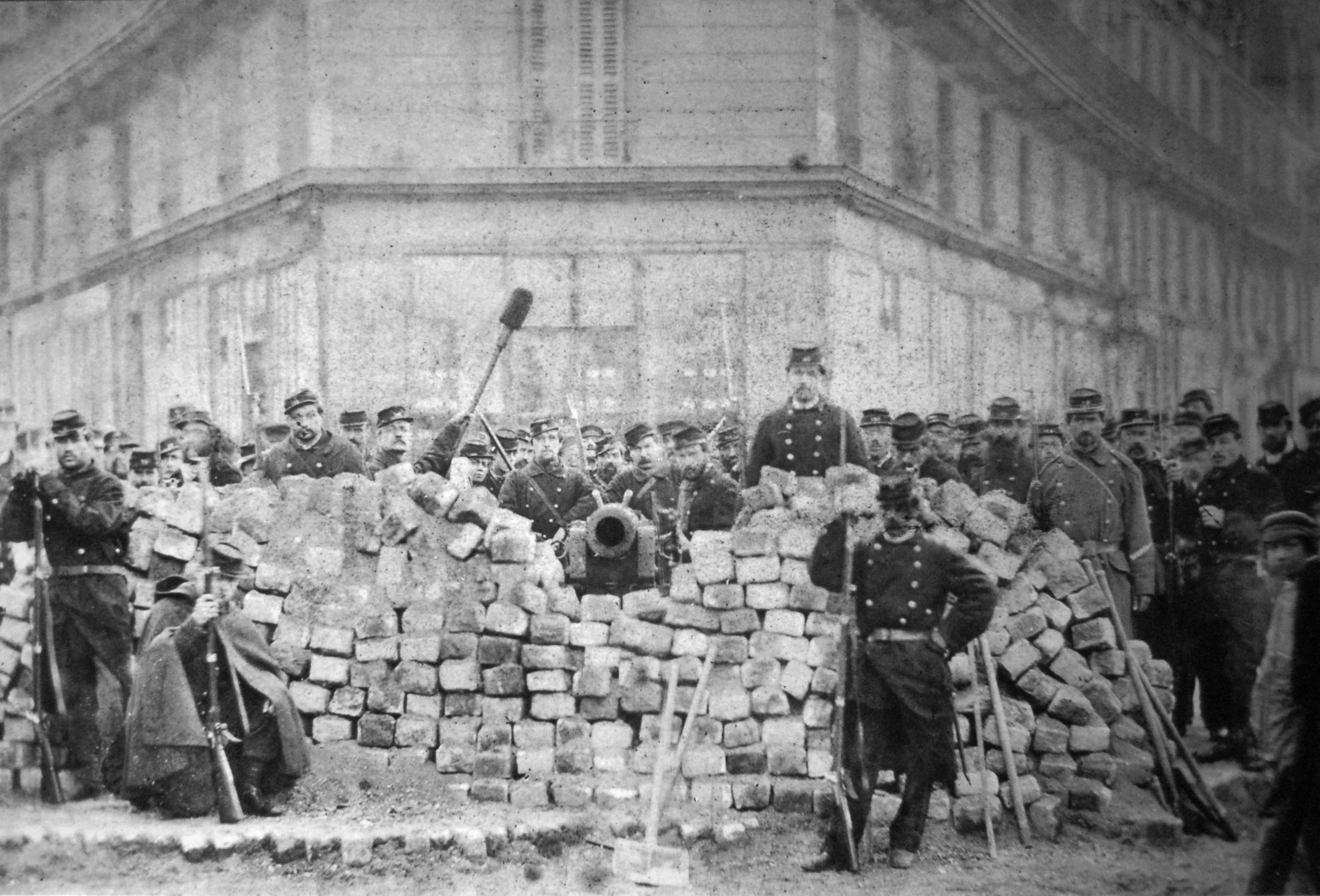
Barricades Boulevard Voltaire, Paris during the uprising known as the Paris Commune

In 1871, in the wake of the Franco-Prussian War an uprising in Paris established the Paris Commune. The Paris Commune was a government that briefly ruled Paris from 18 March (more formally, from 28 March) to 28 May 1871. The Commune was the result of an uprising in Paris after France was defeated in the Franco-Prussian War. Anarchists participated actively in the establishment of the Paris Commune. The 92 members of the Communal Council included a high proportion of skilled workers and several professionals. Many of them were political activists, ranging from reformist republicans, various types of socialists, to the Jacobins who tended to look back nostalgically to the Revolution of 1789.

The "reforms initiated by the Commune, such as the re-opening of workplaces as co-operatives, anarchists can see their ideas of associated labour beginning to be realised.... Moreover, the Commune's ideas on federation obviously reflected the influence of Proudhon on French radical ideas. Indeed, the Commune's vision of a communal France based on a federation of delegates bound by imperative mandates issued by their electors and subject to recall at any moment echoes Bakunin's and Proudhon's ideas (Proudhon, like Bakunin, had argued in favour of the "implementation of the binding mandate" in 1848...and for federation of communes). George Woodcock manifests that "a notable contribution to the activities of the Commune and particularly to the organisation of public services was made by members of various anarchist factions, including the mutualists Courbet, Longuet, and Vermorel, the libertarian collectivists Varlin, Malon, and Lefrangais, and the bakuninists Elie and Elisée Reclus and Louise Michel".

The veteran leader of the Blanquist group of revolutionary socialists, Louis Auguste Blanqui, was hoped by his followers to be a potential leader of the revolution, but he had been arrested on 17 March and was held in prison throughout the life of the Commune. The Commune unsuccessfully tried to exchange him, first against Georges Darboy, Archbishop of Paris, then against all 74 hostages it detained, but Thiers flatly refused. Some women organised a feminist movement, following on from earlier attempts in 1789 and 1848. Thus, Nathalie Lemel, a socialist bookbinder, and Élisabeth Dmitrieff, a young Russian exile and member of the Russian section of the First International (IWA), created the Union des femmes pour la défense de Paris et les soins aux blessés ("Women's Union for the Defence of Paris and Care of the Wounded") on 11 April 1871. The Women's Union also participated in several municipal commissions and organized cooperative workshops. Following the 1871 Paris Commune, the socialist movement, as the whole of the workers' movement, was decapitated and deeply affected for years.

According to Marx and Engels, for a few weeks the Paris Commune provided a glimpse of a socialist society before it was brutally suppressed by the French government. Engels' 1891 postscript to The Civil War In France by Marx read: "From the outset the Commune was compelled to recognize that the working class, once come to power, could not manage with the old state machine; that in order not to lose again its only just conquered supremacy, this working class must, on the one hand, do away with all the old repressive machinery previously used against it itself, and, on the other, safeguard itself against its own deputies and officials, by declaring them all, without exception, subject to recall at any moment."

=== Second International ===
As the ideas of Marx and Engels took on flesh, particularly in central Europe, socialists sought to unite in an international organisation. In 1889, on the centennial of the French Revolution of 1789, the Second International was founded, with 384 delegates from 20 countries representing about 300 labour and socialist organisations. Anarchists were ejected and not allowed in mainly because of the pressure from Marxists.

Just before his death in 1895, Engels argued that there was now a "single generally recognised, crystal clear theory of Marx" and a "single great international army of socialists". Despite its illegality due to the Anti-Socialist Laws of 1878, the Social Democratic Party of Germany's use of the limited universal male suffrage were "potent" new methods of struggle which demonstrated their growing strength and forced the dropping of the Anti-Socialist legislation in 1890, Engels argued. In 1893, the German SPD obtained 1,787,000 votes, a quarter of votes cast. However, before the leadership of the SPD published Engels' 1895 Introduction to Marx's Class Struggles in France 1848–1850, they removed certain phrases they felt were too revolutionary.

Marx believed that it was possible to have a peaceful socialist transformation in England, although the British ruling class would then revolt against such a victory. The United States and the Netherlands might also have a peaceful transformation, but not in France, where Marx believed there had been "perfected... an enormous bureaucratic and military organisation, with its ingenious state machinery" which must be forcibly overthrown. However, eight years after Marx's death, Engels argued that it was possible to achieve a peaceful socialist revolution in France, too.

==== Germany ====
The SPD was by far the most powerful of the social democratic parties. Its votes reached 4.5 million, it had 90 daily newspapers, together with trade unions and co-ops, sports clubs, a youth organisation, a women's organisation and hundreds of full-time officials. Under the pressure of this growing party, Bismarck introduced limited welfare provision and working hours were reduced. Germany experienced sustained economic growth for more than forty years. Commentators suggest that this expansion, together with the concessions won, gave rise to illusions amongst the leadership of the SPD that capitalism would evolve into socialism gradually.

Beginning in 1896, in a series of articles published under the title "Problems of socialism", Eduard Bernstein argued that an evolutionary transition to socialism was both possible and more desirable than revolutionary change. Bernstein and his supporters came to be identified as "revisionists" because they sought to revise the classic tenets of Marxism. Although the orthodox Marxists in the party, led by Karl Kautsky, retained the Marxist theory of revolution as the official doctrine of the party, and it was repeatedly endorsed by SPD conferences, in practice the SPD leadership became increasingly reformist.

==== Russia ====
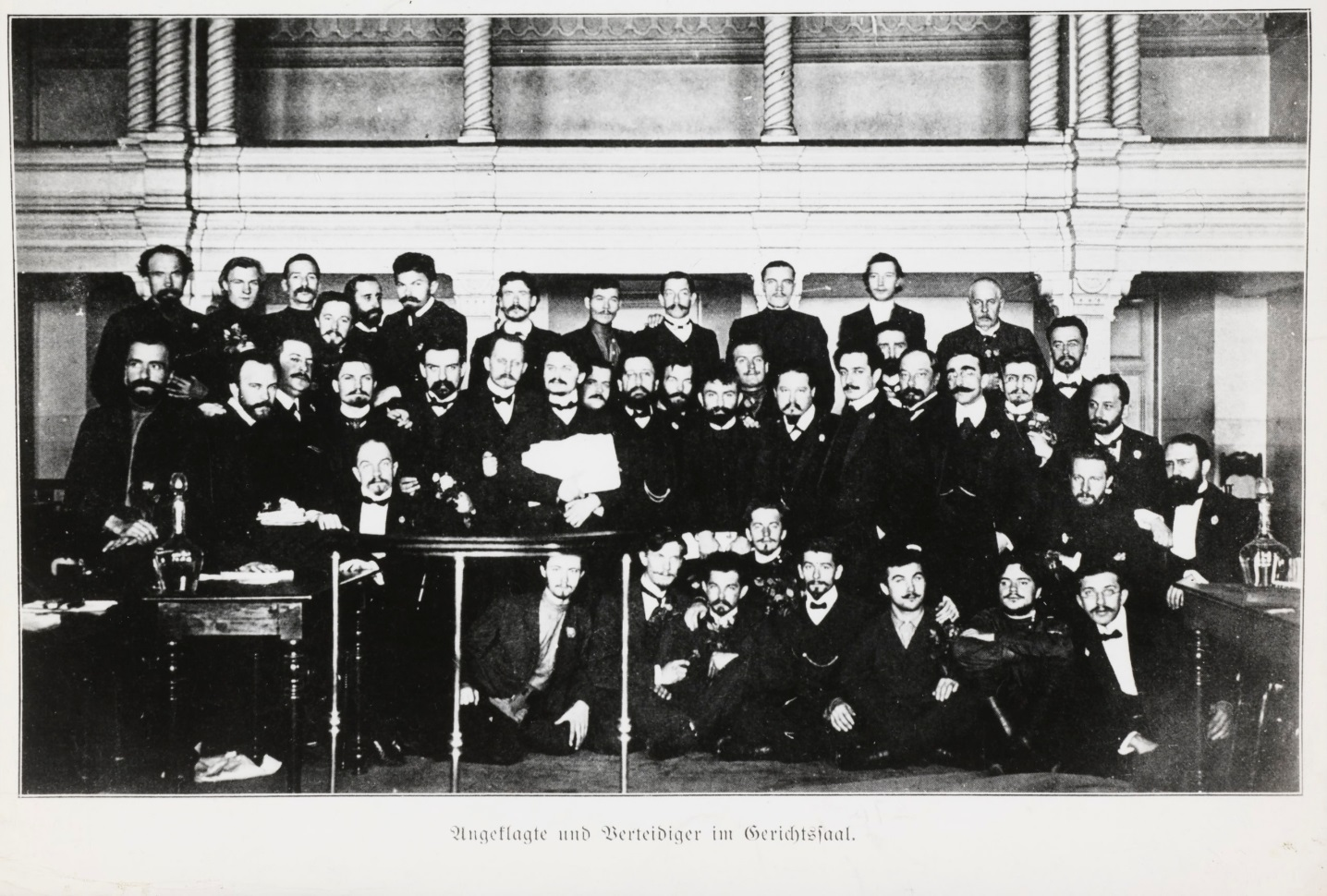
The Soviet of Workers' Deputies of St. Petersburg in 1905, Trotsky in the center. The soviets were an early example of a workers council.

Bernstein coined the aphorism: "The movement is everything, the final goal nothing". But the path of reform appeared blocked to the Russian Marxists while Russia remained the bulwark of reaction. In the preface to the 1882 Russian edition to the Communist Manifesto, Marx and Engels had saluted the Russian Marxists who, they said, "formed the vanguard of revolutionary action in Europe". But the working class, although many were organised in vast modern western-owned enterprises, comprised no more than a small percentage of the population and "more than half the land is owned in common by the peasants". Marx and Engels posed the question: How was the Russian Empire to progress to socialism? Could Russia "pass directly" to socialism or "must it first pass through the same process" of capitalist development as the West? They replied: "If the Russian Revolution becomes the signal for a proletarian revolution in the West, so that both complement each other, the present Russian common ownership of land may serve as the starting point for a communist development."

In 1903, the Russian Social Democratic Labour Party began to split on ideological and organisational questions into Bolshevik ('Majority') and Menshevik ('Minority') factions, with Russian revolutionary Vladimir Lenin leading the more radical Bolsheviks. Both wings accepted that Russia was an economically backward country unripe for socialism. The Mensheviks awaited the capitalist revolution in Russia. But Lenin argued that a revolution of the workers and peasants would achieve this task. After the 1905 Russian Revolution, Leon Trotsky argued that unlike the French revolution of 1789 and the European Revolutions of 1848 against absolutism, the capitalist class would never organise a revolution in Russia to overthrow Tsarist autocracy, and that this task fell to the working class who, liberating the peasantry from their feudal yoke, would then immediately pass on to the socialist tasks and seek a "permanent revolution" to achieve international socialism. Assyrian nationalist Freydun Atturaya tried to create regional self-government for the Assyrian people with the socialism ideology. He even wrote the Urmia Manifesto of the United Free Assyria. However, his attempt was put to an end by Soviet Secret Police.

==== United States ====
By the 1880s anarcho-communism was already present in the United States as can be seen in the publication of the journal Freedom: A Revolutionary Anarchist-Communist Monthly by Lucy Parsons and Lizzy Holmes. Around that time, these American anarcho-communist sectors entered in debate with the individualist anarchist group around Benjamin Tucker. After embracing anarchism, Albert Parsons turned his activity to the growing movement to establish the 8-hour day. In January 1880, the Eight-Hour League of Chicago sent Parsons to a national conference in Washington, D.C., a gathering which launched a national lobbying movement aimed at coordinating efforts of labour organisations to win and enforce the 8-hour workday. In the fall of 1884, Parsons launched a weekly anarchist newspaper in Chicago, The Alarm. The first issue was dated October 4, 1884, and was produced in a press run of 15,000 copies. The publication was a 4-page broadsheet with a cover price of 5 cents. The Alarm listed the International Working People's Association as its publisher and touted itself as "A Socialistic Weekly" on its page 2 masthead. On May 1, 1886, Parsons, with his wife Lucy Parsons and two children, led 80,000 people down Michigan Avenue, in what is regarded as the first-ever May Day Parade, in support of the eight-hour work day. Over the next few days 340,000 laborers joined the strike. Parsons, amidst the May Day Strike, found himself called to Cincinnati, where 300,000 workers had struck that Saturday afternoon. On that Sunday he addressed the rally in Cincinnati of the news from the "storm center" of the strike and participated in a second huge parade, led by 200 members of The Cincinnati Rifle Union, with certainty that victory was at hand. In 1886, the Federation of Organized Trades and Labor Unions (FOTLU) of the United States and Canada unanimously set 1 May 1886, as the date by which the eight-hour work day would become standard. In response, unions across the United States prepared a general strike in support of the event.

On 3 May, in Chicago, a fight broke out when strikebreakers attempted to cross the picket line, and two workers died when police opened fire upon the crowd. The next day on 4 May, anarchists staged a rally at Chicago's Haymarket Square. A bomb was thrown and in the ensuing panic, police opened fire on the crowd and each other. Seven police officers and at least four workers were killed. Eight anarchists directly and indirectly related to the organisers of the rally were arrested and charged with the murder of the deceased officer. The men became international political celebrities among the labour movement. Four of the men were executed and a fifth committed suicide prior to his own execution. The incident became known as the Haymarket affair, and was a setback for the labour movement and the struggle for the eight-hour day. In 1890 a second attempt, this time international in scope, to organise for the eight-hour day was made. The event also had the secondary purpose of memorialising workers killed as a result of the Haymarket affair. Although it had initially been conceived as a once-off event, by the following year the celebration of International Workers' Day on May Day had become firmly established as an international worker's holiday. Emma Goldman, the activist and political theorist, was attracted to anarchism after reading about the incident and the executions, which she later described as "the events that had inspired my spiritual birth and growth." She considered the Haymarket martyrs to be "the most decisive influence in my existence". Her associate, Alexander Berkman also described the Haymarket anarchists as "a potent and vital inspiration." Others whose commitment to anarchism crystallized as a result of the Haymarket affair included Voltairine de Cleyre and "Big Bill" Haywood, a founding member of the Industrial Workers of the World. Goldman wrote to historian, Max Nettlau, that the Haymarket affair had awakened the social consciousness of "hundreds, perhaps thousands, of people".

In 1877, the Socialist Labor Party of America was founded. This party, which advocated Marxism and still exists today, was a confederation of small Marxist parties and came under the leadership of Daniel De Leon. In 1901, a merger between opponents of De Leon and the younger Social Democratic Party joined with Eugene V. Debs to form the Socialist Party of America. In 1905, the Industrial Workers of the World (IWW) formed from several independent labour unions. The IWW opposed the political means of Debs and De Leon, as well as the craft unionism of Samuel Gompers. In 1910, the Sewer Socialists, the main group of American socialists, elected Victor Berger as a socialist member of the United States House of Representatives and Emil Seidel as a socialist mayor of Milwaukee, Wisconsin, most of the other elected city officials being socialist as well. This Socialist Party of America (SPA) membership grew to 150,000 in 1912. In the 1912 United States presidential election, SPA candidate Eugene V. Debs received 5.99% of the popular vote (a total of 901,551 votes), while his total of 913,693 votes in the 1920 campaign, although smaller percentage-wise, remains the all-time high for a Socialist Party candidate in the United States. Socialist mayor Daniel Hoan, was elected in 1916 and stayed in office until 1940. The final Socialist mayor, Frank P. Zeidler, was elected in 1948 and served three terms, ending in 1960. Milwaukee remained the hub of Socialism during these years.

==== France ====
French socialism was beheaded by the suppression of the Paris commune (1871), its leaders killed or exiled. But in 1879, at the Marseille Congress, workers' associations created the Federation of the Socialist Workers of France. Three years later, Jules Guesde and Paul Lafargue, the son-in-law of Karl Marx, left the federation and founded the French Workers' Party.

The Federation of the Socialist Workers of France was termed "possibilist" because it advocated gradual reforms, whereas the French Workers' Party promoted Marxism. In 1905 these two trends merged to form the French Section Française de l'Internationale Ouvrière (SFIO), led by Jean Jaurès and later Léon Blum. In 1906 it won 56 seats in Parliament. The SFIO adhered to Marxist ideas but became, in practice, a reformist party. By 1914 it had more than 100 members in the Chamber of Deputies.

=== Social democracy and split with the communists ===
The Social Democratic Party of Germany (SPD) became the largest and most powerful socialist party in Europe, despite working illegally until the anti-socialist laws were dropped in 1890. In the 1893 elections it gained 1,787,000 votes, a quarter of the total votes cast, according to Engels. In 1895, the year of his death, Engels emphasised the Communist Manifesto's emphasis on winning, as a first step, the "battle of democracy". Since the 1866 introduction of universal male franchise the SPD had proved that old methods of, "surprise attacks, of revolutions carried through by small conscious minorities at the head of masses lacking consciousness is past". Marxists, Engels emphasised, must "win over the great mass of the people" before initiating a revolution. Marx believed that it was possible to have a peaceful socialist revolution in England, America and the Netherlands, but not in France, where he believed there had been "perfected ... an enormous bureaucratic and military organisation, with its ingenious state machinery" which must be forcibly overthrown. However, eight years after Marx's death, Engels regarded it possible to achieve a peaceful socialist revolution in France, too.

In 1896, Eduard Bernstein argued that once full democracy had been achieved, a transition to socialism by gradual means was both possible and more desirable than revolutionary change. Bernstein and his supporters came to be identified as "revisionists", because they sought to revise the classic tenets of Marxism. Although the orthodox Marxists in the party, led by Karl Kautsky, retained the Marxist theory of revolution as the official doctrine of the party, and it was repeatedly endorsed by SPD conferences, in practice the SPD leadership became more and more reformist. In Europe, most Social Democratic parties participated in parliamentary politics and the day-to-day struggles of the trade unions. In the UK, however, many trade unionists who were members of the Social Democratic Federation (SDF), which included at various times future trade union leaders such as Will Thorne, John Burns and Tom Mann, felt that the Federation neglected the industrial struggle. Along with Engels, who refused to support the SDF, many felt that dogmatic approach of the SDF, particularly of its leader, Henry Hyndman, meant that it remained an isolated sect. The mass parties of the working class under social democratic leadership became more reformist and lost sight of their revolutionary objective. Thus the French Section of the Workers' International (SFIO), founded in 1905, under Jean Jaurès and later Léon Blum adhered to Marxist ideas, but became in practice a reformist party.

In some countries, particularly the United Kingdom of Great Britain and Ireland and the British dominions, labour parties were formed. These were parties largely formed by and controlled by the trade unions, rather than formed by groups of socialist activists who then appealed to the workers for support. In Britain the Labour Party, (at first the Labour Representation Committee) was established by representatives of trade unions together with affiliated socialist parties, principally the Independent Labour Party but also for a time the avowedly Marxist Social Democratic Federation and other groups, such as the Fabians. On 1 December 1899 Anderson Dawson of the Australian Labor Party became the Premier of Colony of Queensland forming the world's first parliamentary socialist government. The Dawson government, however, lasted only one week, being defeated at the first sitting of parliament. The British Labour Party first won seats in the House of Commons in 1902. It won the majority of the working class away from the Liberal Party after World War I. In Australia, the Labor Party achieved rapid success, forming its first national government in 1904. Labour parties were also formed in South Africa and New Zealand but had less success. The British Labour Party adopted a specifically socialist constitution ('Clause four, Part four') in 1918.

The strongest opposition to revisionism came from socialists in countries such as the Russian Empire where parliamentary democracy did not exist. Chief among these was the Russian Vladimir Lenin, whose works such as Our Programme (1899) set out the views of those who rejected revisionist ideas. In 1903, there was the beginnings of what eventually became a formal split in the Russian Social Democratic Labor Party into revolutionary Bolshevik and reformist Menshevik factions.

==== World War I ====
In 1914, the outbreak of World War I led to a crisis in European socialism. Many European socialist leaders supported their respective governments' war aims. The social democratic parties in the UK, France, Belgium and Germany supported their respective state's wartime military and economic planning, discarding their commitment to internationalism and solidarity. The parliamentary leaderships of the socialist parties of Germany, France, Belgium and Britain each voted to support the war aims of their country's governments, although some leaders, like Ramsay MacDonald in Britain and Karl Liebknecht in Germany, opposed the war from the start.

However, in many cases this caused the fragmentation between socialists who were willing to support the war effort and those who were not. In the German example, support for the war by the Social Democratic Party of Germany (SPD) led to a schism between them and some of their far left supporters.

Lenin, in exile in Switzerland, called for revolutions in all the combatant states as the only way to end the war and achieve socialism. Lenin, Leon Trotsky, Karl Liebknecht and Rosa Luxemburg, together with a small number of other Marxists opposed to the war, came together in the Zimmerwald Conference in September 1915. This conference saw the beginning of the end of the uneasy coexistence of revolutionary socialists with the social democrats, and by 1917 war-weariness led to splits in several socialist parties, notably the German Social Democrats, and the collapse of the Second International. In his 1917 April Theses, Lenin denounced the war as an imperialist conflict, and urged workers worldwide to use it as an occasion for proletarian revolution.

The Russian Revolution of October 1917 led to a withdrawal from World War I, one of the principal demands of the Russian revolution, as the Soviet government immediately sued for peace. Germany and the former allies invaded the new Soviet Russia, which had repudiated the former Romanov regime's national debts and nationalised the banks and major industry. Russia was the only country in the world where socialists had taken power, and it appeared to many socialists to confirm the ideas, strategy and tactics of Lenin and Trotsky.

During the late Nineteenth and Early Twentieth Centuries, socialists in a number of countries successfully secured various social reforms.

== Inter-war era (1917–1939) ==
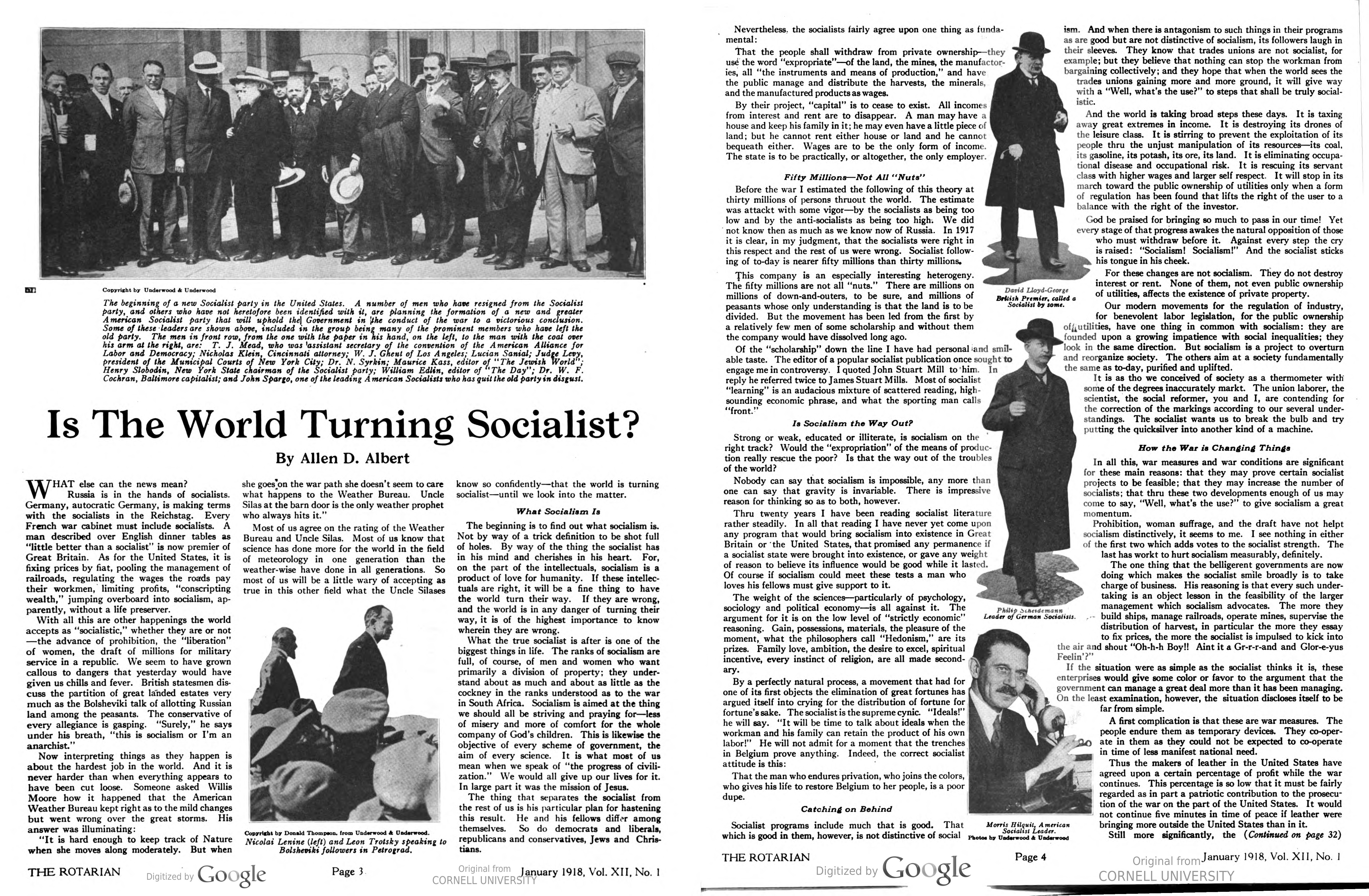
"Is The World Turning Socialist?" An article by Allen D. Albert published in The Rotarian commenting on the rising popularity of socialism in the postwar era, January 1918

The Russian Revolution of October 1917 brought about the definitive ideological division between Communists as denoted with a capital "C" on the one hand and other communist and socialist trends such as anarcho-communists and social democrats, on the other. The Left Opposition in the Soviet Union gave rise to Trotskyism which was to remain isolated and insignificant for another fifty years, except in Sri Lanka where Trotskyism gained the majority and the pro-Moscow wing was expelled from the Communist Party.

In 1922, 4th World Congress of the Communist International took up the policy of the united front, urging Communists to work with rank and file Social Democrats while remaining critical of their leaders, who they criticised for "betraying" the working class by supporting the war efforts of their respective capitalist classes. For their part, the social democrats pointed to the dislocation caused by revolution and later the growing authoritarianism of the Communist Parties. When the Communist Party of Great Britain applied to affiliate to the Labour Party in 1920 it was turned down.

=== Revolutionary socialism and the Soviet Union ===
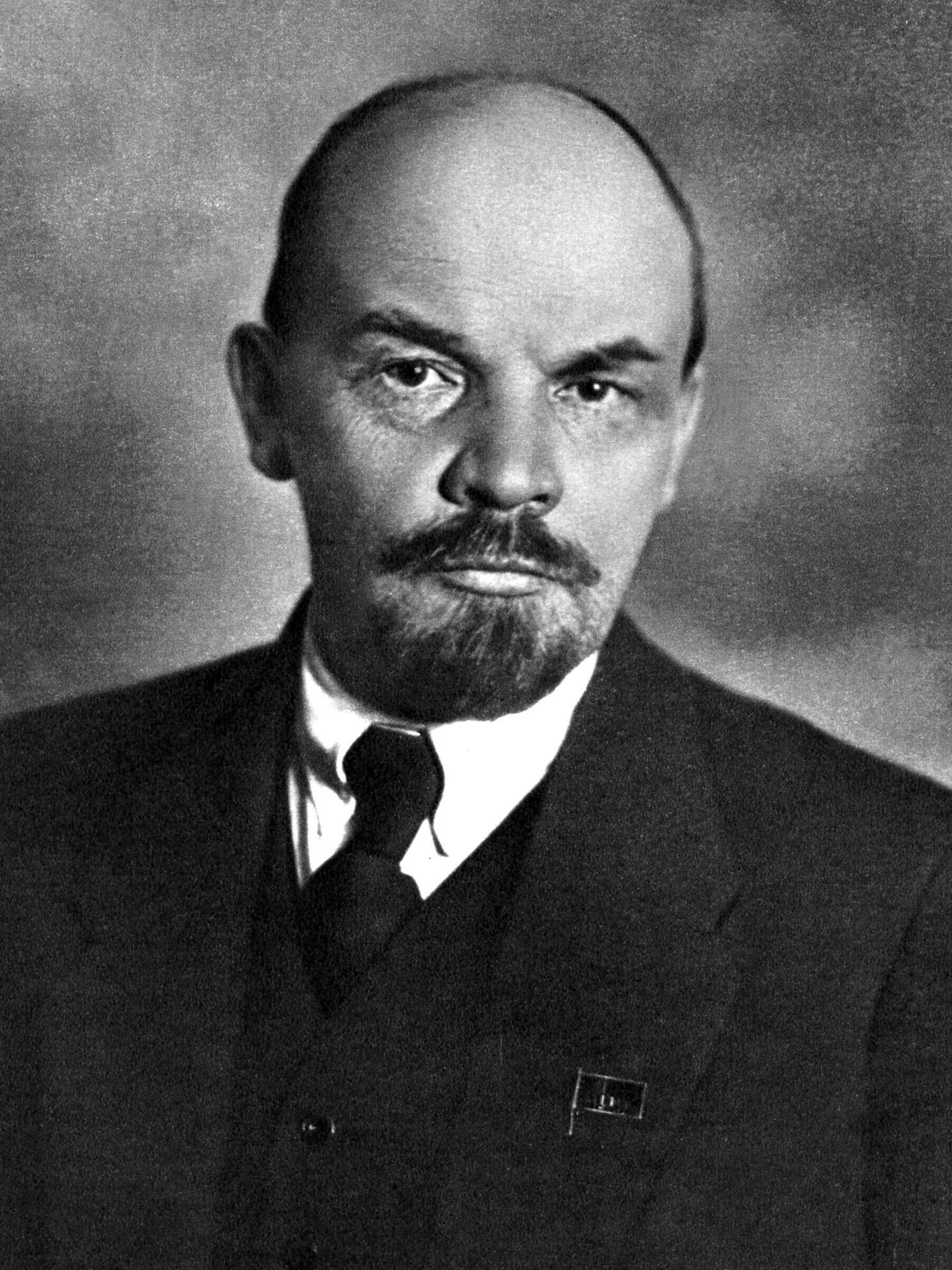
Vladimir Lenin, founder of the Soviet Union and the leader of the Bolshevik party.

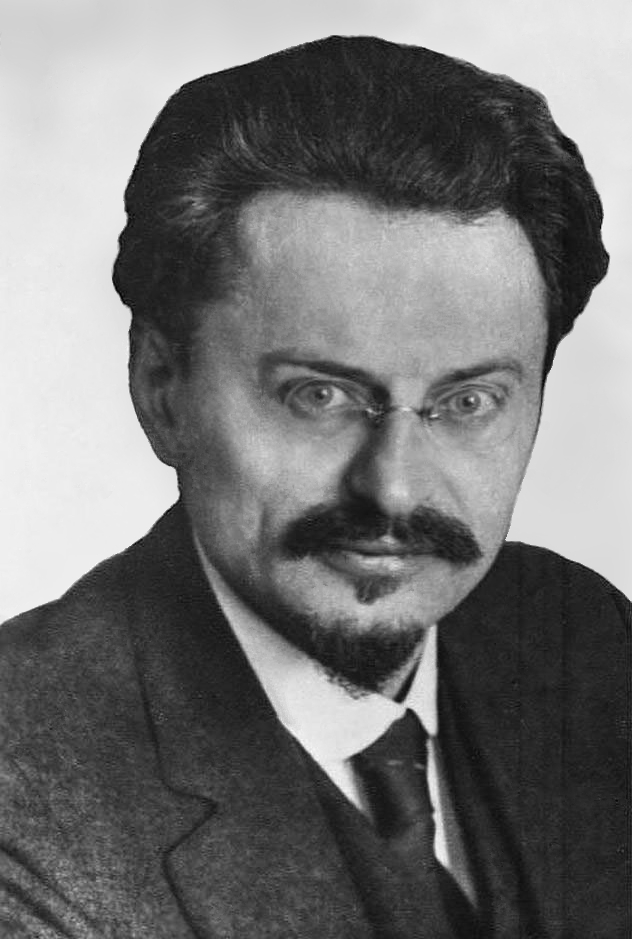
Leon Trotsky, founder of the Red Army and a key figure in the October Revolution.

The First World War was at first greeted with enthusiastic patriotism among many social democratic and labour parties and even some anarchists, while being opposed by pacifists and by more left-wing, internationalist movements. By 1917, however, it produced an upsurge of radicalism in most of Europe and as far afield as the United States and Australia. In the Russian Revolution of February 1917, workers' councils (in Russian, soviets) had been formed, and Lenin and the Bolsheviks called for "All power to the Soviets". After the October 1917 Russian revolution, led by Lenin and Trotsky, consolidated power in the Soviets, Lenin declared "Long live the world socialist revolution!". Briefly in Soviet Russia socialism was not just a vision of a future society, but a description of an existing one. The Soviet regime began to bring all the means of production (except agricultural production) under state control, and implemented a system of government through the workers' councils or soviets. Lenin's government also instituted a number of progressive measures such as universal education, healthcare and equal rights for women.

Anarchists participated alongside the Bolsheviks in both February and October revolutions, and were initially enthusiastic about the Bolshevik coup. However, the Bolsheviks soon turned against the anarchists and other left-wing opposition, a conflict that culminated in the 1921 Kronstadt rebellion which the new government repressed. In part, due to a number of assassination attempts on Bolshevik senior leaders and organized insurrections against the Soviet government. Anarchists in central Russia were either imprisoned, driven underground or joined the victorious Bolsheviks; the anarchists from Petrograd and Moscow fled to Ukraine. There, in the Makhnovshchina, they fought in the civil war against the Whites (a Western-backed grouping of monarchists and other opponents of the October Revolution) and then the Bolsheviks as part of the Revolutionary Insurgent Army of Ukraine led by Nestor Makhno, who established an anarchist society in the region for a number of months.

The initial success of the Russian Revolution inspired other revolutionary parties to attempt the same thing unleashing the Revolutions of 1917–1923. In the chaotic circumstances of postwar Europe, with the socialist parties divided and discredited, Communist revolutions across Europe seemed a possibility. Communist parties were formed, often from minority or majority factions in most of the world's socialist parties, which broke away in support of the Leninist model. The German Revolution of 1918–1919 overthrew the old absolutism and, like Russia, set up Workers' and Soldiers' Councils almost entirely made up of SPD and Independent Social Democrats (USPD) members. The Weimar Republic was established and placed the SPD in power, under the leadership of Friedrich Ebert. Ebert agreed with Max von Baden that a social revolution was to be prevented and the state order must be upheld at any cost. In 1919 the Spartacist uprising challenged the power of the SPD government, but it was put down in blood and the German Communist Spartacus League leaders Karl Liebknecht and Rosa Luxemburg were assassinated. Communist regimes briefly held power under Béla Kun in Hungary and under Kurt Eisner in Bavaria. There were further revolutionary movements in Germany until 1923, as well as in Vienna, and also the Biennio Rosso in the industrial centres of northern Italy. In this period few Communists doubted, least of all Lenin and Trotsky, that successful socialist revolutions carried out by the working classes of the most developed capitalist counties were essential to the success of the socialism, and therefore to the success of socialism in Russia in particular. In March 1918, Lenin said: "We are doomed if the German revolution does not break out". In 1919, the Communist Parties came together to form a 'Third International', termed the Communist International or Comintern. But the prolonged revolutionary period in Germany did not bring a socialist revolution.

A Marxist current critical of the Bolsheviks emerged and as such "Luxemburg's workerism and spontaneism are exemplary of positions later taken up by the far-left of the period – Pannekoek, Roland Holst, and Gorter in the Netherlands, Sylvia Pankhurst in Britain, Gramsci in Italy, Lukacs in Hungary. In these formulations, the dictatorship of the proletariat was to be the dictatorship of a class, "not of a party or of a clique". However, within this line of thought "[t]he tension between anti-vanguardism and vanguardism has frequently resolved itself in two diametrically opposed ways: the first involved a drift towards the party; the second saw a move towards the idea of complete proletarian spontaneity...The first course is exemplified most clearly in Gramsci and Lukacs...The second course is illustrated in the tendency, developing from the Dutch and German far-lefts, which inclined towards the complete eradication of the party form." In the emerging Soviet state there appeared Left-wing uprisings against the Bolsheviks which were a series of rebellions and uprisings against the Bolsheviks led or supported by left-wing groups including Socialist Revolutionaries, Left Socialist-Revolutionaries, Mensheviks, and anarchists. Some were in support of the White movement while some tried to be an independent force. The uprisings started in 1918 and continued through the Russian Civil War and after until 1922; they included the Left SR uprising (1918), Bolshevik–Makhnovist conflict (1920–1921), Tambov Rebellion (1920–1921), Kronstadt Rebellion (1921) and August Uprising in Georgia (1924). In response, the Bolsheviks increasingly abandoned attempts to get other socialist groups to join the government and instead suppressed them with growing force.

The invasion of Russia by the Allies, their trade embargo and backing for the White forces fighting against the Red Army in the civil war in the Soviet Union was cited by Aneurin Bevan, the leader of the left-wing in the Labour Party, as one of the causes of the Russian revolution's degeneration into dictatorship. A "Red Scare" in the United States was raised against the American Socialist Party of Eugene V. Debs and the Communist Party of America which arose after the Russian revolution from members who had broken from Debs' party.

Within a few years, a bureaucracy developed in the Soviet Union as a result of the Russian Civil War, foreign invasion, and Russia's historic poverty and backwardness. The bureaucracy undermined the democratic and socialist ideals of the Bolsheviks and elevated Joseph Stalin to their leadership after Lenin's death. In order to consolidate power, the bureaucracy conducted a brutal campaign of lies and violence against the Left Opposition led by Trotsky. By the mid-1920s, the impetus had gone out of the revolutionary forces in Europe and the national reformist socialist parties had regained their dominance over the working-class movement in most countries.

In the Soviet Union, from 1924 Stalin pursued a policy of "socialism in one country". Trotsky argued that this approach was a shift away from the theory of Marx and Lenin, while others argued that it was a practical compromise fit for the times. The postwar revolutionary upsurge provoked a powerful reaction from the forces of conservatism. Winston Churchill declared that Bolshevism must be "strangled in its cradle".

When Stalin consolidated his power in the Soviet Union in the late 1920s, Trotsky was forced into exile, eventually residing in Mexico. He maintained active in organising the Left Opposition internationally, which worked within the Comintern to gain new members. Some leaders of the Communist Parties sided with Trotsky, such as James P. Cannon in the United States. They found themselves expelled by the Stalinist Parties and persecuted by both GPU agents and the political police in Britain, France, the United States, China, and all over the world. Trotskyist parties had a large influence in Sri Lanka and Bolivia.

After 1929, with the Left Opposition legally banned and Trotsky exiled, Stalin led the Soviet Union into a what he termed a "higher stage of socialism." Agriculture was forcibly collectivised, at the cost of a massive famine and millions of deaths among the resistant peasantry. The surplus squeezed from the peasants was spent on a program of crash industrialisation, guided by the Communist Party through the Five-Year Plan. This program produced some impressive results, though at enormous human costs. Russia raised itself from an economically backward country to that of a superpower.

For "many Marxian libertarian socialists, the political bankruptcy of socialist orthodoxy necessitated a theoretical break. This break took a number of forms. The Bordigists and the SPGB championed a super-Marxian intransigence in theoretical matters. Other socialists made a return "behind Marx" to the anti-positivist programme of German idealism. Libertarian socialism has frequently linked its anti-authoritarian political aspirations with this theoretical differentiation from orthodoxy... Karl Korsch... remained a libertarian socialist for a large part of his life and because of the persistent urge towards theoretical openness in his work. Korsch rejected the eternal and static, and he was obsessed by the essential role of practice in a theory's truth. For Korsch, no theory could escape history, not even Marxism. In this vein, Korsch even credited the stimulus for Marx's Capital to the movement of the oppressed classes."

The Soviet achievement in the 1930s seemed hugely impressive from the outside, and convinced many people, not necessarily Communists or even socialists, of the virtues of state planning and authoritarian models of social development. This was later to have important consequences in countries like China, India and Egypt, which tried to copy some aspects of the Soviet model. It also won large sections of the western intelligentsia over to a pro-Soviet view, to the extent that many were willing to ignore or excuse such events as Stalin's Great Purge of 1936–38, in which millions of people died. The Great Depression, which began in 1929, seemed to socialists and Communists everywhere to be the final proof of the bankruptcy, literally as well as politically, of capitalism. Socialists were unable to take advantage of the Depression to either win elections or stage revolutions.

In the United States, the New Deal liberalism of President Franklin D. Roosevelt won mass support and deprived socialists of any chance of gaining ground. In Germany, it was the fascists of Adolf Hitler's Nazi Party who successfully exploited the Depression to win power, in January 1933. Hitler's regime swiftly destroyed both the German Communist Party and the Social Democratic Party, the worst blow the world socialist movement had ever suffered. This forced Stalin to reassess his strategy, and from 1935 the Comintern began urging a popular front against fascism. The socialist parties were at first suspicious, given the bitter hostility of the 1920s, but eventually effective Popular Fronts were formed in both France and Spain. After the election of a Popular Front government in Spain in 1936 a fascist military revolt led to the Spanish Civil War. The crisis in Spain also brought down the Popular Front government in France under Léon Blum. Ultimately the Popular Fronts were not able to prevent the spread of fascism or the aggressive plans of the fascist powers. Trotskyists considered Popular Fronts a "strike breaking conspiracy" and considered them an impediment to successful resistance to fascism.

In the 1920s and 1930s, the rise of fascism in Europe transformed anarchism's conflict with the state. In Spain, the Confederación Nacional del Tabajo (CNT) initially refused to join a popular front electoral alliance, and abstention by CNT supporters led to a right wing election victory. But in 1936, the CNT changed its policy and anarchist votes helped bring the popular front back to power. Months later, the former ruling class responded with an attempted coup causing the Spanish Civil War (1936–1939). In response to the army rebellion, an anarchist-inspired movement of peasants and workers, supported by armed militias, took control of Barcelona and of large areas of rural Spain where they collectivised the land. But even before the Nationalist victory in 1939, the anarchists were losing ground in a bitter struggle with the Stalinists, who controlled the distribution of military aid to the Republican cause from the Soviet Union. Stalinist-led troops suppressed the collectives and persecuted both dissident Marxists and anarchists.

In 1938, Trotsky and his supporters founded a new international organisation of dissident communists, the Fourth International. In his Results and Prospects and Permanent Revolution Trotsky developed a theory of revolution uninterrupted by the stagism of Stalinist orthodoxy. He argued that Russia was a bureaucratically degenerated workers' state in his work The Revolution Betrayed, where he predicted (?) that if a political revolution of the working class did not overthrow Stalinism, the Stalinist bureaucracy would resurrect capitalism.

=== Britain ===
Once the world's most powerful nation, Britain avoided a revolution during the period of 1917–1923 but was significantly affected by revolt. The Prime Minister, David Lloyd George, had promised the troops in the 1918 United Kingdom general election that his Conservative-led coalition would make post-war Britain "a fit land for heroes to live in". But many demobilized troops complained of chronic unemployment and suffered low pay, disease and poor housing. In 1918, the Labour Party adopted as its aim to secure for the workers, "the common ownership of the means of production, distribution and exchange". In 1919, the Miners Federation, whose Members of Parliament predated the formation of the Labour Party and were since 1906 a part of that body, demanded the withdrawal of British troops from Soviet Russia. The 1919 Labour Party Conference voted to discuss the question of affiliation to the Third (Communist) International, "to the distress of its leaders". A vote was won committing the Labour Party committee of the Trades Union Congress (TUC) to arrange "direct industrial action" to "stop capitalist attacks upon the Socialist Republics of Russia and Hungary." The threat of immediate strike action forced the Conservative-led coalition government to abandon its intervention in Russia.

In 1914 the unions of the transport workers, the mine workers and the railway workers had formed a Triple Alliance. In 1919, Lloyd George sent for the leaders of the Triple Alliance, one of whom was miner's leader Robert Smillie, a founder member of the Independent Labour Party in 1889 who was to become a Labour Party MP in the first 1924 Labour government. According to Smillie, Lloyd George said: "Gentlemen, you have fashioned, in the Triple Alliance of the unions represented by you, a most powerful instrument. I feel bound to tell you that in our opinion we are at your mercy. The Army is disaffected and cannot be relied upon. Trouble has occurred already in a number of camps. We have just emerged from a great war and the people are eager for the reward of their sacrifices, and we are in no position to satisfy them. In these circumstances, if you carry out your threat and strike, then you will defeat us. But if you do so, have you weighed the consequences? The strike will be in defiance of the government of the country and by its very success will precipitate a constitutional crisis of the first importance. For, if a force arises in the state which is stronger than the state itself, then it must be ready to take on the functions of the state, or withdraw and accept the authority of the state. Gentlemen, have you considered, and if you have, are you ready?" "From that moment on", Smillie conceded to Aneurin Bevan, "we were beaten and we knew we were". When the 1926 United Kingdom general strike broke out, the trade union leaders, "had never worked out the revolutionary implications of direct action on such a scale", Bevan says. Bevan was a member of the Independent Labour Party and one of the leaders of the South Wales miners during the strike. The TUC called off the strike after nine days. In the North East of England and elsewhere, "councils of action" were set up, with many rank and file Communist Party of Great Britain members often playing a critical role. The councils of action took control of essential transport and other duties. When the strike ended, the miners were locked out and remained locked out for six months. Bevan became a Labour MP in 1929.

In January 1924, the Labour Party formed a minority government for the first time with Ramsay MacDonald as prime minister. The Labour Party intended to ratify an Anglo-Russian trade agreement, which would break the trade embargo on Russia. This was attacked by the Conservatives and new elections took place in October 1924. Four days before polling day the Daily Mail published the Zinoviev letter, a forgery that claimed the Labour Party had links with Soviet Communists and was secretly fomenting revolution. The fears instilled by the press of a Labour Party in secret Communist manoeuvres, together with the halfhearted "respectable" policies pursued by MacDonald, led to Labour losing the October 1924 general election. The victorious Conservatives repudiated the Anglo-Soviet treaty. The leadership of the Labour Party, like social democratic parties almost everywhere, (with the exception of Sweden and Belgium), tried to pursue a policy of moderation and economic orthodoxy. At times of depression this policy was not popular with the Labour Party's working class supporters. The influence of Marxism grew in the Labour Party during the inter-war years. Anthony Crosland argued in 1956 that under the impact of the 1931 slump and the growth of fascism, the younger generation of left-wing intellectuals for the most part "took to Marxism" including the "best-known leaders" of the Fabian tradition, Sidney and Beatrice Webb. The Marxist Professor Harold Laski, who was to be chairman of the Labour Party in 1945–6, was the "outstanding influence" in the political field. The Marxists within the Labour Party differed in their attitude to the Communists. Some were uncritical and some were expelled as "fellow travellers", while in the 1930s others were Trotskyists and sympathisers working inside the Labour Party, especially in its youth wing where they were influential.

In the general election of 1929 the Labour Party won 288 seats out of 615 and formed another minority government. The Great Depression of that period brought high unemployment and Prime Minister MacDonald sought to make cuts in order to balance the budget. The trade unions opposed MacDonald's proposed cuts and he split the Labour government to form the National Government of 1931. This experience moved the Labour Party leftward, and at the start of the Second World War an official Labour Party pamphlet written by Harold Laski stated that "the rise of Hitler and the methods by which he seeks to maintain and expand his power are deeply rooted in the economic and social system of Europe... economic nationalism, the fight for markets, the destruction of political democracy, the use of war as an instrument of national policy." In The Labour Party, the War and the Future (1939), Laski wrote: "The war will leave its meed of great problems, problems of internal social organisation... Business men and aristocrats, the old ruling classes of Europe, had their chance from 1919 to 1939; they failed to take advantage of it. They rebuilt the world in the image of their own vested interests... The ruling class has failed; this war is the proof of it. The time has come to give the common people the right to become the master of their own destiny... Capitalism has been tried; the results of its power are before us today. Imperialism has been tried; it is the foster-parent of this great agony. Given power [the Labour Party] will seek, as no other Party will seek, the basic transformation of our society. It will replace the profit-seeking motive by the motive of public service... there is now no prospect of domestic well-being or of international peace except in Socialism."

=== United States ===
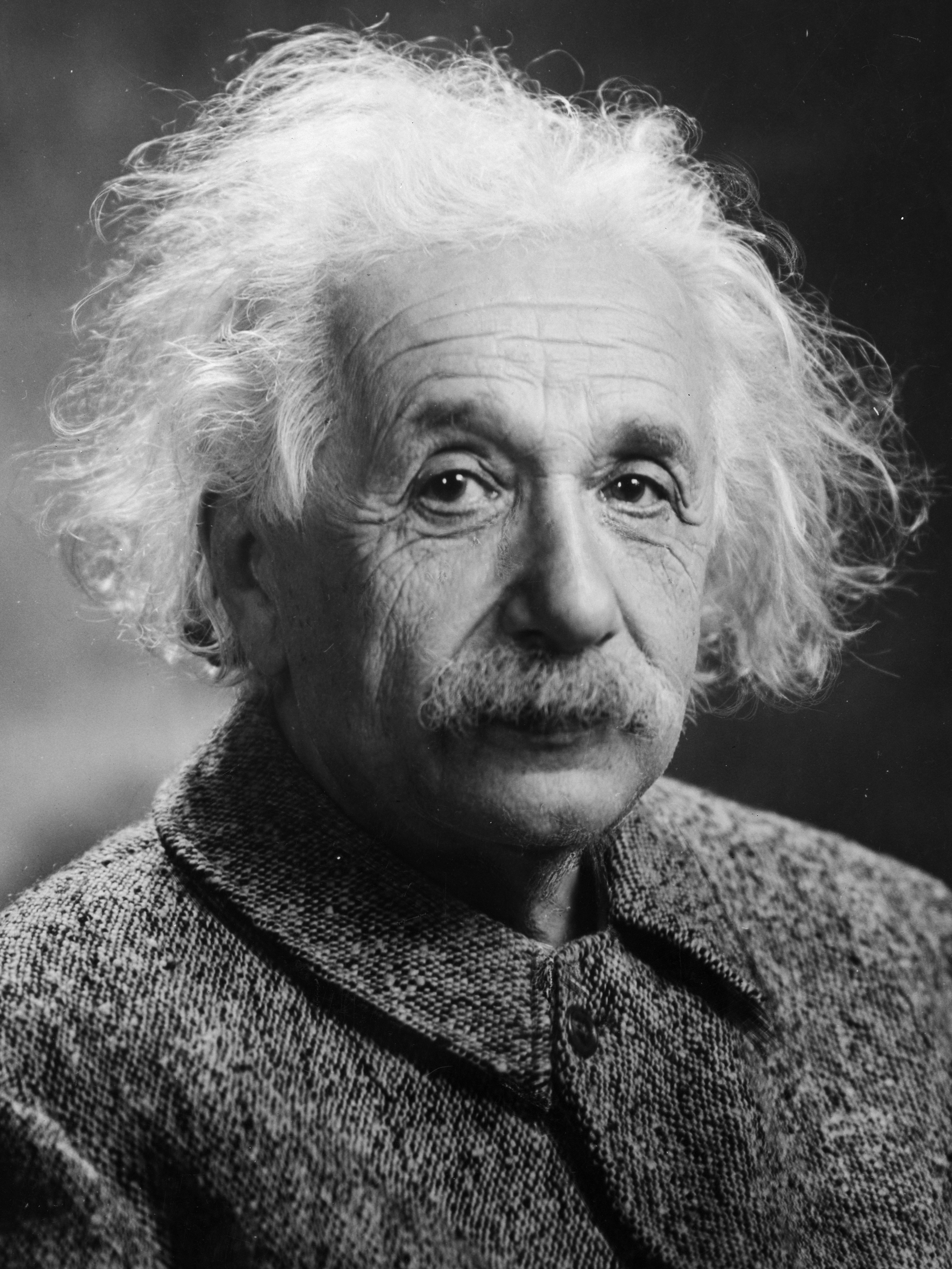
Albert Einstein advocated for a socialist planned economy with his 1949 article "Why Socialism?"

In the United States, the Communist Party USA was formed in 1919 from former adherents of the Socialist Party of America. One of the founders, James P. Cannon, later became the leader of Trotskyist forces outside the Soviet Union. The Great Depression began in the US on Black Tuesday, October 29, 1929, leading to mass unemployment and debt. In 1921 occurred the largest armed, organised uprising in American labour history: the Battle of Blair Mountain. Ten to fifteen thousand coal miners rebelled in West Virginia, assaulting mountain-top lines of trenches established by the coal companies and local sheriff's forces. Workers organised against their deteriorating conditions and socialists played a critical role. In 1934 the Minneapolis Teamsters Strike led by the Trotskyist Communist League of America, the West Coast waterfront strike led by the Communist Party USA, and the Toledo Auto-Lite strike led by the American Workers Party, played an important role in the formation of the Congress of Industrial Organizations (CIO) in the USA.

In Minnesota, the General Drivers Local 574 of the International Brotherhood of Teamsters struck, despite an attempt to block the vote by American Federation of Labor officials, demanding union recognition, increased wages, shorter hours, overtime rates, improved working conditions and job protection through seniority. In the battles that followed, which captured country-wide media attention, three strikes took place, martial law was declared and the Minnesota National Guard was sent in. Two strikers were killed. Protest rallies of 40,000 were held. Farrell Dobbs, who became the leader of the local, had at the outset joined the "small and poverty-stricken" Communist League of America, founded by James P. Cannon and others in 1928 after their expulsion from the Communist Party USA for Trotskyism. Success for the CIO quickly followed its formation. In 1937, one of the founding unions of the CIO, the United Auto Workers, won union recognition at General Motors Corporation after a tumultuous forty-four-day sit-down strike, while the Steel Workers Organizing Committee, which was formed by the CIO, won a collective bargaining agreement with U.S. Steel. The CIO merged with the American Federation of Labor (AFL) in 1955 becoming the AFL–CIO.

=== Germany ===
In 1928, the Communist International, now fully under the leadership of Stalin, turned from the united front policy to an ultra-left policy of the Third Period, a policy of aggressive confrontation of social democracy. This divided the working class at a critical time. The Communists described the Social Democratic leaders as "social fascists" and in the Prussian Landtag they voted with the Nazis in an unsuccessful attempt to bring down the Social Democratic government. Fascism continued to grow, with powerful backing from industrialists, especially in heavy industry, and Hitler was invited into power in 1933.

In the 1930s, the Social Democratic Party of Germany (SPD), a reformist socialist political party that was up to then based upon revisionist Marxism, began a transition away from Marxism towards liberal socialism beginning in the 1930s. After the party was banned by the Nazi regime in 1933, the SPD acted in exile through the Sopade. In 1934 the Sopade began to publish material that indicated that the SPD was turning towards liberal socialism. Sopade member Curt Geyer was a prominent proponent of liberal socialism within the Sopade, and declared that Sopade represented the tradition of Weimar Republic social democracy—liberal democratic socialism, and declared that Sopade's held true to its mandate of traditional liberal principles combined with the political realism of socialism. After the restoration of democracy in West Germany, the SPD's Godesberg Program in 1959 eliminated the party's remaining Marxist-aligned policies. The SPD then became officially based upon freiheitlicher Sozialismus (liberal socialism).

Hitler's regime swiftly destroyed both the German Communist Party and the Social Democratic Party.

=== Sweden ===
The Swedish Social democrats formed a government in 1932. They broke with economic orthodoxy during the depression and carried out extensive public works financed from government borrowing. They emphasised large-scale intervention and the high unemployment they had inherited was eliminated by 1938. Their success encouraged the adoption of Keynesian policies of deficit financing pursued by almost all Western countries after World War II.

=== Spain ===
During the Spanish Civil War, anarchists set up different forms of cooperative and communal arrangements, especially in the rural areas of Aragon and Catalonia. However, these communes were disbanded by the Popular Front government of the Second Spanish Republic.

=== Israel ===
Jewish Zionists established utopian socialist communities in Palestine, which were known as kibbutzim, a small number of which still survive.

== WWII and the Post-war and Cold War era (1945–1989) ==
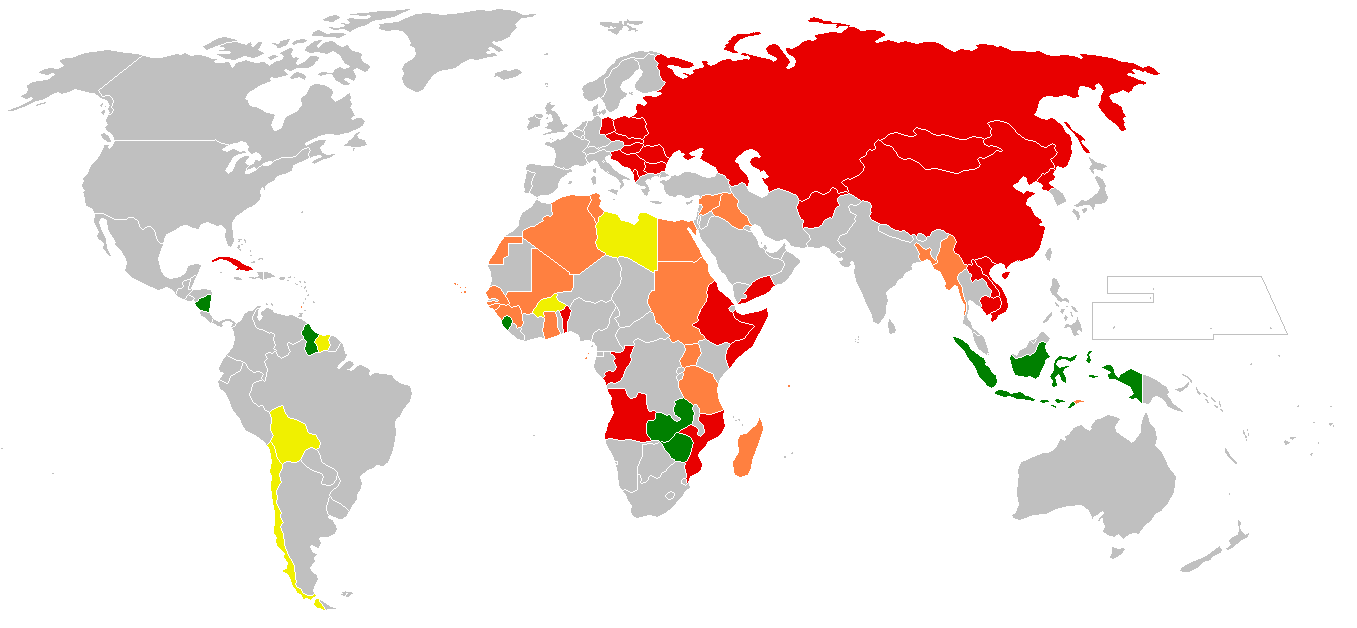
World Map of Socialist countries in 1985

As a result of the failure of the Popular Fronts and the inability of Britain and France to conclude a defensive alliance against Hitler, Stalin again changed his policy in August 1939 and signed a non-aggression pact, the Molotov–Ribbentrop Pact, with Nazi Germany. Shortly afterwards World War II broke out, and within two years Hitler had occupied most of Europe, and by 1942 both democracy and social democracy in Central and Eastern Europe fell under the threat of fascism. The only socialist parties of any significance able to operate freely were those in Britain, Sweden, Switzerland, Canada, Australia and New Zealand. But the entry of the Soviet Union into the war in 1941 marked the turning of the tide against fascism, and as the German armies retreated another great upsurge in left-wing sentiment swelled up in their wake. The resistance movements against German occupation were mostly led by socialists and Communists, and by the end of the war the parties of the left were greatly strengthened.

The Second International, which had been based in Amsterdam, ceased to operate during the war. It was refounded as the Socialist International at a congress in Frankfurt in 1951. Since Stalin had dissolved the Comintern in 1943, as part of a deal with the imperialist powers, this was now the only effective international socialist organisation. The Frankfurt Declaration took a stand against both capitalism and the Communism of Stalin and stated that "Socialism aims to liberate the peoples from dependence on a minority which owns or controls the means of production. It aims to put economic power in the hands of the people as a whole, and to create a community in which free men work together as equals.... Socialism has become a major force in world affairs. It has passed from propaganda into practice. In some countries the foundations of a Socialist society have already been laid. Here the evils of capitalism are disappearing.... Since the Bolshevik revolution in Russia, Communism has split the International Labour Movement and has set back the realisation of socialism in many countries for decades. Communism falsely claims a share in the Socialist tradition. In fact, it has distorted that tradition beyond recognition. It has built up a rigid theology which is incompatible with the critical spirit of Marxism.... Wherever it has gained power it has destroyed freedom or the chance of gaining freedom...."

In 1945, the three great powers of the Allies of World War II met at the Yalta Conference to negotiate an amicable and stable peace. UK Prime Minister Winston Churchill joined USA President Franklin D. Roosevelt and Joseph Stalin, General Secretary of the Communist Party of the Soviet Union's Central Committee. With the relative decline of Britain compared to the two superpowers, the US and the Soviet Union, however, many viewed the world as "bi-polar" – a world with two irreconcilable and antagonistic political and economic systems.

One of the great postwar victories of democratic socialism was the election victory of the British Labour Party led by Clement Attlee in June 1945. Socialist (and in some places Stalinist) parties also dominated postwar governments in France, Italy, Czechoslovakia, Belgium, Norway and other European countries. The Social Democratic Party had been in power in Sweden since the 1932 general election, and Labour parties also held power in Australia and New Zealand. In Germany, on the other hand, the Social Democrats emerged from the war much weakened, and were defeated in Germany's first democratic elections in 1949. The united front between democrats and the Stalinist parties which had been established in the wartime resistance movements continued in the immediate postwar years. The democratic socialist parties of Eastern Europe, however, were destroyed when Stalin imposed so-called "Communist" regimes in these countries.

In the Cold War's bi-polar world, socialists were forced to choose between supporting the liberal democratic camp (as with America's "Non-Communist Left" or the Atlanticists in the British Labour Party), support the opposing camp led by Moscow (as with the Communist movement), or seek an independent path (as with the Non-Aligned Movement). Anarcho-pacifism became influential in the Anti-nuclear movement and anti-war movements of the time as can be seen in the activism and writings of the English anarchist member of Campaign for Nuclear Disarmament Alex Comfort or the similar activism of the American catholic anarcho-pacifists Ammon Hennacy and Dorothy Day. Anarcho-pacifism became a "basis for a critique of militarism on both sides of the Cold War." The resurgence of anarchist ideas during this period is well documented in Robert Graham's Anarchism: A Documentary History of Libertarian Ideas, Volume Two: The Emergence of the New Anarchism (1939–1977).

=== First socialist government in a North American country ===
The first socialist government of Canada and one of the most influential came to power in the province of Saskatchewan in 1944. The Co-operative Commonwealth Federation (CCF) of Tommy Douglas won an overwhelming victory toppling the age old Liberal regime which had dominated Saskatchewan politics since the founding of the province in 1905. Douglas and the CCF won five consecutive electoral victories. During his time in office he created the Saskatchewan Power Corporation which extended electricity services to the many rural villages and farms who before did without, created Canada's first public automobile insurance agency, created a substantial number of Crown Corporations (government and public owned businesses) many of which still exist today in Saskatchewan, allowed the unionisation of the public service, created the first system of Universal Health Care in Canada (which would later be adopted nationally in 1965), and created the Saskatchewan Bill of Rights, the first such charter in Canada. This preceded the Canadian Charter of Rights and Freedoms as well as the previous Canadian Bill of Rights.

The New Democratic Party (NDP) (as the CCF became known in 1962) went on to dominate the politics of Saskatchewan and form governments in British Columbia, Manitoba, Ontario, and the Yukon Territory. Nationally the NDP would become very influential during four minority governments, and is today by far Canada's most successful left-wing political party. In 2004 Canadians voted Tommy Douglas in as The Greatest Canadian as part of a nationwide contest organised by the Canadian Broadcasting Corporation (CBC).

=== Social democracy in government ===
The social democratic governments in the post war period introduced measures of social reform and wealth redistribution through state welfare and taxation policy. For instance the newly elected UK Labour government carried out nationalisations of major utilities such as mines, gas, coal, electricity, rail, iron and steel, and the Bank of England. France claimed to be the most state controlled capitalist country in the world, carrying through many nationalisations. In the UK the National Health Service was established bringing free health care to all for the first time. Social housing for working-class families was provided in council housing estates and university education was made available for working-class people through a grant system. However, the parliamentary leadership of the social democracies in general had no intention of ending capitalism, and their national outlook and their dedication to the maintenance of the post-war 'order' prevented the social democracies from making any significant changes to the economy. They were termed 'socialist' by all in 1945, but in the UK, for instance, where Social Democracy had a large majority in the Parliament of the United Kingdom, "The government had not the smallest intention of bringing in the 'common ownership of the means of production, distribution and exchange'" as written in Clause 4 of the Labour Party constitution. In Germany, the Social Democratic Party of Germany adopted the Godesberg Program in 1959, which rejected class struggle and Marxism. West German Chancellor Willy Brandt has been identified as a liberal socialist.

In the UK, cabinet minister Herbert Morrison famously argued that, "Socialism is what the Labour government does", and Anthony Crosland argued that capitalism had been ended. However many socialists within the social democracy, at rank and file level as well as in a minority in the leadership such as Aneurin Bevan, feared the 'return of the 1930s' unless capitalism was ended, either directly or over a definite period of time. They criticised the government for not going further to take over the commanding heights of the economy. Bevan demanded that the "main streams of economic activity are brought under public direction" with economic planning, and criticised the Labour Party's implementation of nationalisation for not empowering the workers in the nationalised industries with democratic control over their operation. In the post war period, many Trotskyists expected at first the pattern of financial instability and recession to return. Instead the capitalist world, now led by the United States, embarked on a prolonged boom which lasted until 1973. Rising living standards across Europe and North America alongside low unemployment, was achieved, in the view of the socialists, by the efforts of trade union struggle, social reform by social democracy, and the ushering in of what was termed a "mixed economy".

Social democracy at first took the view that they had begun a "serious assault" on the five "Giant Evils" afflicting the working class, identified for instance by the British social reformer William Beveridge: "Want, Disease, Ignorance, Squalor, and Idleness". At the same time, the wartime alliance between the Soviet Union and the west broke down from 1946 onward, and relations between the Communist parties and the democratic socialist parties broke down in parallel. Once the Stalinists helped stabilise the capitalist governments in the immediate upheavals of 1945, as per the agreements between Stalin, Roosevelt, and Churchill, the capitalist politicians had no more use for them. The French, Italian and Belgian Communists withdrew or were expelled from post-war coalition governments, and civil war broke out in Greece. The imposition of Stalinist regimes in Poland, Hungary and Czechoslovakia not only destroyed the socialist parties in those countries, it also produced a reaction against socialism in general. The Australian and New Zealand Labour governments were defeated in 1949, and the British Labour government in 1951. As the Cold War deepened, conservative rule in Britain, Germany and Italy became more strongly entrenched. Only in the Scandinavian countries and to some extent in France did the socialist parties retain their positions. But in 1958 Charles de Gaulle seized power in France and the French socialists (SFIO) found themselves cast into opposition.

In the 1960s and 1970s the new social forces, introduced, the social democrats argued, by their 'mixed economy' and their many reforms of capitalism, began to change the political landscape in the western world. The long postwar boom and the rapid expansion of higher education produced, as well as rising living standards for the industrial working class, a mass university-educated white collar workforce, nevertheless began to break down the old socialist-versus-conservative polarity of European politics. This new white-collar workforce, some claimed, was less interested in traditional socialist policies such as state ownership and more interested in expanded personal freedom and liberal social policies. The proportion of women in the paid workforce increased and many supported the struggle for equal pay, which, some argued, changed both the composition and the political outlook of the working class. Some socialist parties reacted more flexibly and successfully to these changes than others, but eventually the leaderships of all social democracies in Europe moved to an explicitly pro-capitalist stance. Symbolically in the UK, the socialist clause, Clause four, was removed from the Labour Party Constitution, in 1995. A similar change took place in the German SPD.

Particularly after the coming to power of British Premier Margaret Thatcher in 1979 and US President Ronald Reagan in 1981, and the fall of the Berlin Wall in 1989, many social democratic party leaders were won to the ideological offensive which argued that capitalism had "won" and that, in the words of Francis Fukuyama's essay, capitalism had reached "the end point of mankind's ideological evolution and the universalization of Western liberal democracy as the final form of human government.". Some parties reacted to these changes by engaging in a new round of revisionist re-assessment of socialist ideology, and adopting a neo-liberal outlook. Some critics argue that in practice the Social Democratic parties, and the Labour Party in particular, can no longer be described as socialist. On Prime Minister Tony Blair's departure in June 2007, left wing trade union leader Bob Crow, general secretary of the Rail, Maritime and Transport workers union (RMT), argued that Blair will be remembered for "seamlessly continuing the neo-liberal economic and social policies of Margaret Thatcher".

=== Africa ===
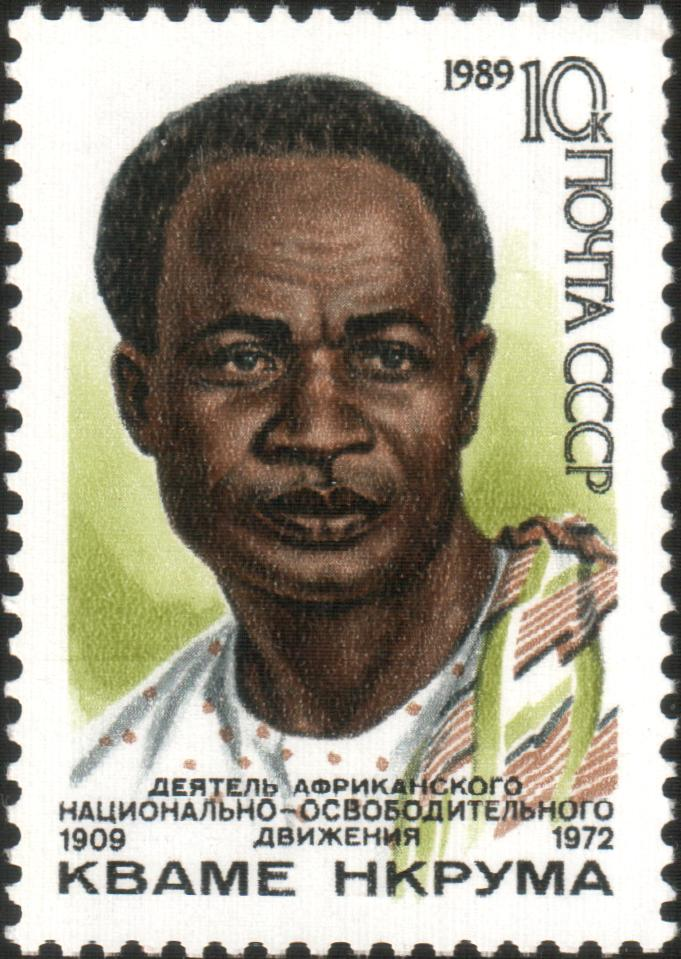
Kwame Nkrumah, the first president of Ghana and theorist of African socialism, on a Soviet Union commemorative postage stamp

African socialism has been and continues to be a major ideology around the continent, playing a major role in the post-war period of decolonisation. Julius Nyerere was inspired by Fabian socialist ideals. He was a firm believer in rural Africans and their traditions and ujamaa, a system of collectivisation that according to Nyerere was present before European imperialism. He believed Africans were already socialists.

Other African socialists include Jomo Kenyatta, Kenneth Kaunda, Nelson Mandela and Kwame Nkrumah. Fela Kuti was inspired by socialism and called for a democratic African republic.

=== Mass discontent and radicalisation ===
Another manifestation of this changing social landscape was the rise of mass discontent, including the radical student movement, both in the United States – where it was driven mainly by opposition to the Vietnam War, and in Europe. Aside from the Civil Rights Movement, in which socialists participated, the anti-war movement was the first left-wing upsurge in the United States since the 1930s, but neither there nor in Europe did the traditional parties of the left lead the movement. In the mid-20th century some libertarian socialist groups emerged from disagreements with Trotskyism which presented itself as Leninist anti-stalinism. As such the French group Socialisme ou Barbarie emerged from the Trotskyist Fourth International, where Castoriadis and Claude Lefort constituted a Chaulieu–Montal Tendency in the French Parti Communiste Internationaliste in 1946. In 1948, they experienced their "final disenchantment with Trotskyism", leading them to break away to form Socialisme ou Barbarie, whose journal began appearing in March 1949. Castoriadis later said of this period that "the main audience of the group and of the journal was formed by groups of the old, radical left: Bordigists, council communists, some anarchists and some offspring of the German "left" of the 1920s". Instead Trotskyist, Maoist and anarchist groups arose. They became particularly influential in 1968, when riots amounting almost to an insurrection broke out in Paris in May 1968. Between eight and ten million workers struck, challenging the view becoming popular amongst socialists at the time that the working class were no longer a force for change. There were also major disturbances such as the 1968 Democratic National Convention protest activity in Chicago, the Columbia University protests of 1968 in New York, the embryonic Red Army Faction in West Berlin, and in other cities. In the short-term these movements provoked a conservative backlash, seen in De Gaulle's 1968 election victory and the election of Richard Nixon in the 1968 United States presidential election. In the 1970s, as particularly the far left Trotskyist groups continued to grow, the socialist and Communist parties again sought to channel people's anger back into safe confines, as they did in 1945. The British Labour Party had already returned to office under Harold Wilson in 1964, and in 1969 the German Social Democrats came to power for the first time since the 1920s under Willy Brandt. In France François Mitterrand buried the corpse of the old socialist party, the SFIO, and founded a new Socialist Party in 1971, although it would take him a decade to lead it to power. Labour governments were elected in both Australia and New Zealand in 1972, and the Austrian Socialists under Bruno Kreisky formed their first post-war government in 1970.

The emergence of the New Left in the 1950s and 1960s led to a revival of interest in libertarian socialism. The New Left's critique of the Old Left's authoritarianism was associated with a strong interest in personal liberty, autonomy (see the thinking of Cornelius Castoriadis) and led to a rediscovery of older socialist traditions, such as left communism, council communism, and the Industrial Workers of the World. The New Left also led to a revival of anarchism. Journals like Radical America and Black Mask in America, Solidarity, Big Flame and Democracy & Nature, succeeded by The International Journal of Inclusive Democracy, in the UK, introduced a range of left libertarian ideas to a new generation. Social ecology, autonomism and, more recently, participatory economics (parecon), and Inclusive Democracy emerged from this.

A surge of popular interest in anarchism occurred during the 1960s and 1970s. In 1968 in Carrara, Italy the International of Anarchist Federations was founded during an international Anarchist conference in Carrara in 1968 by the three existing European federations of France, the Italian and the Iberian Anarchist Federation as well as the Bulgarian federation in French exile. In the United Kingdom this was associated with the punk rock movement, as exemplified by bands such as Crass and the Sex Pistols. The housing and employment crisis in most of Western Europe led to the formation of communes and squatter movements like that of Barcelona, Spain. In Denmark, squatters occupied a disused military base and declared the Freetown Christiania, an autonomous haven in central Copenhagen. Since the revival of anarchism in the mid 20th century, a number of new movements and schools of thought emerged.

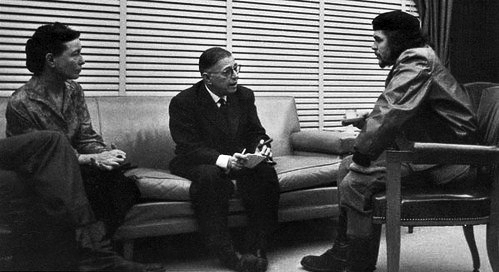
Encounter between Simone de Beauvoir, Jean-Paul Sartre and Che Guevara in Cuba, three radical icons of the 1960s

The New Left in the United States also included anarchist, counter-cultural and hippie-related radical groups such as the Yippies who were led by Abbie Hoffman, The Diggers and Up Against the Wall Motherfuckers. By late 1966, the Diggers opened free stores which simply gave away their stock, provided free food, distributed free drugs, gave away money, organised free music concerts, and performed works of political art. The Diggers took their name from the original English Diggers led by Gerrard Winstanley and sought to create a mini-society free of money and capitalism. On the other hand, the Yippies employed theatrical gestures, such as advancing a pig ("Pigasus the Immortal") as a candidate for president in 1968, to mock the social status quo. They have been described as a highly theatrical, anti-authoritarian and anarchist youth movement of "symbolic politics". Since they were well known for street theatre and politically themed pranks, many of the "old school" political left either ignored or denounced them. According to ABC News, "The group was known for street theatre pranks and was once referred to as the 'Groucho Marxists'."

Autonomist Marxism, Neo-Marxism and Situationist theory are also regarded as being anti-authoritarian variants of Marxism that are firmly within the libertarian socialist tradition. For libcom.org "In the 1980s and 90s, a series of other groups developed, influenced also by much of the above work. The most notable are Kolinko, Kurasje and Wildcat in Germany, Aufheben in England, Theorie Communiste in France, TPTG in Greece and Kamunist Kranti in India. They are also connected to other groups in other countries, merging autonomia, operaismo, Hegelian Marxism, the work of the JFT, Open Marxism, the ICO, the Situationist International, anarchism and post-68 German Marxism." Related to this were intellectuals who were influenced by Italian left communist Amadeo Bordiga but who disagreed with his leninist positions; these included the French publication Invariance edited by Jacques Camatte, published since 1968, and Gilles Dauvé who published Troploin with Karl Nesic.

After the Stonewall Rebellion, the New York Gay Liberation Front based their organisation in part on a reading of Murray Bookchin's anarchist writings.". In 1968 in Carrara, Italy the International of Anarchist Federations was founded during an international anarchist conference held there in 1968 by the three existing European federations of France, the Italian and the Iberian Anarchist Federation as well as the Bulgarian federation in French exile. During the events of May 68 the anarchist groups active in France were Fédération anarchiste, Mouvement communiste libertaire, Union fédérale des anarchistes, Alliance ouvrière anarchiste, Union des groupes anarchistes communistes, Noir et Rouge, Confédération nationale du travail, Union anarcho-syndicaliste, Organisation révolutionnaire anarchiste, Cahiers socialistes libertaires, À contre-courant, La Révolution prolétarienne, and the publications close to Émile Armand.

The early 1970s were a particularly stormy period for socialists, as capitalism had its first worldwide slump of 1973-4, suffered from rising oil prices, and a crisis in confidence. In southern Europe, for example, the Portuguese Carnation Revolution of 1974 threatened the existence of capitalism for a while due to the insurrection and the occupations which followed. A New York Times editorial on February 17, 1975, stated "a communist takeover of Portugal might encourage a similar trend in Italy and France, create problems in Greece and Turkey, affect the succession in Spain and Yugoslavia and send tremors throughout Western Europe." The Greek military dictatorship fell in Greece, PASOK arose at first with a strong socialist outlook, and in Spain, the Spanish State fell in a period of rising struggle. In Italy there was continual unrest, and governments fell almost annually. The Italian workers won and defended the "scala mobile", the sliding scale of wages linked to inflation. However, as before, neither the Communists nor the social democracy had any plans to abolish capitalism, and the occupations in Portugal, variously estimated to have taken between 70 - 90% of the economy, were gradually rolled back. The UK saw a state of emergency and the three-day week, with 22 million days lost in strike action in 1972, leading to the fall of the Heath government. The Trotskyist Militant, an entryist group active in the Labour Party, became the "fifth most important political party" in the UK for a period in the mid-1980s, according to the journalist Michael Crick.

In Indonesia in the mid-1960s, a coup attempt blamed on the Communist Party of Indonesia (PKI) was countered by an anti-communist purge led by Suharto, which mainly targeted the growing influence of the PKI and other leftist groups, with significant support from the United States, which culminated in the overthrow of Sukarno. These events resulted not only in the total destruction of the PKI but also the political left in Indonesia, and paved the way for a major shift in the balance of power in Southeast Asia towards the West, a significant turning point in the global Cold War.

=== Soviet Union and Eastern Europe ===
In 1946, speaking at Westminster College in Fulton, Missouri, former British prime minister Winston Churchill warned that, "From Stettin in the Baltic to Trieste in the Adriatic, an iron curtain has descended across the Continent." In the months that followed, Josef Stalin continued to solidify a Soviet sphere of influence in eastern Europe. For example, Bulgaria received its new Communist premier, Georgi Dimitrov, in November 1946, a Communist government under Bolesław Bierut had been established in Poland already in 1945, and by 1947, Hungary and Romania had also come under full Communist rule. The last democratic government in the eastern bloc, Czechoslovakia, fell to a Communist coup in 1948, and in 1949 the Soviets raised their occupation zone in Germany to become the German Democratic Republic under Walter Ulbricht. To coordinate their new empire, the Soviets established a number of international organisations, first the Cominform to coordinate the policies of the various Communist parties, then the Council for Mutual Economic Assistance (COMECON), in 1948, to control economic planning, and finally (in response to the entry of the Federal Republic of Germany into the North Atlantic Treaty Organization) the Warsaw Pact in 1955, which served as a military alliance against the West. One crack within that sphere of influence emerged after 1948, when Marshal Josip Broz Tito became the president of Yugoslavia. Initial disagreement was over the level of independence claimed by Tito as the only East European Communist ruler commanding a strong domestic majority. Later the gap widened when Tito's government initiated a system of decentralised profit-sharing workers' councils, in effect a self-governing, somewhat market-oriented socialism, which Stalin considered dangerously revisionist. Stalin died in 1953.

In the power struggle that followed Stalin's death, Nikita Khrushchev emerged triumphant. In 1956, at the 20th Congress of the Communist Party of the Soviet Union, he denounced the "personality cult" that had surrounded Stalin in a speech entitled On the Personality Cult and its Consequences. In the de-Stalinization campaign that followed, all buildings and towns that had been named for him were renamed, pictures and statues were destroyed. Although in some respects Khrushchev was a reformer and allowed the emergence of a certain amount of intra-party dissent, his commitment to reform was thrown into doubt with the brutal use of military force on the civilian population of Hungary in 1956 during the Hungarian Revolution and the March 9 massacre in Tbilisi, 1956.

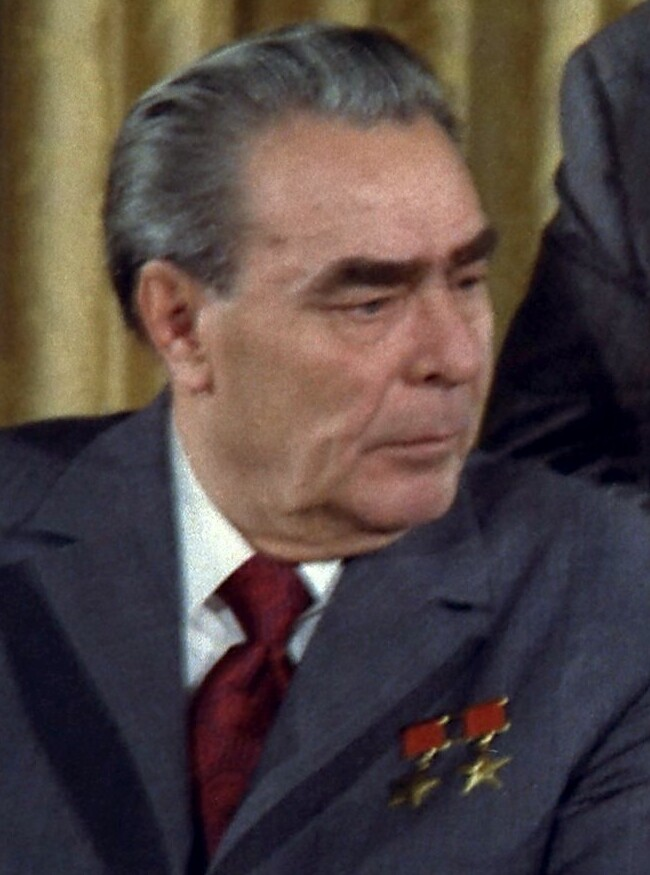
Leonid Brezhnev

By the late 1960s, the people of several Eastern bloc countries had become discontented with the human and economic costs of the Soviet system, the Czechoslovak Socialist Republic especially so. As a result of the growing discontent, the Communist Party of Czechoslovakia began to fear a popular uprising. They initiated reforms to attempt to save the regime, but eventually relied on help from the Stalinists in Russia. In 1968, Alexander Dubček initiated what is known as the Prague Spring, ending censorship of the press and decentralizing production decisions, so that they were to be made not by central planners but by the workers and managers of the factories. People were to be allowed to travel abroad. Brezhnev reacted by announcing and enforcing what became known as the Brezhnev doctrine, which stated: "When forces that are hostile to socialism try to turn the development of some socialist country towards capitalism the suppression of these counter-revolutionary forces becomes not only a problem of the country concerned, but a common problem and concern of all socialist countries." In August 1968, pursuant to this announcement, Soviet Armed Forces troops occupied Czechoslovakia. The following year, the Ukrainians responded to a campaign of passive disobedience on the part of the Czech populace by arranging the replacement of Dubček as First Secretary of the Communist Party of Czechoslovakia. The new first secretary, Gustáv Husák, would prove more compliant. He presided over a 'cleansing' of the Czech Communist Party and the introduction of a new constitution.

The early 1970s saw a period of détente. The arms race between the United States and the Soviet Union slackened. Brezhnev worked with US President Richard Nixon to negotiate and implement the Strategic Arms Limitations Treaty of 1972. Brezhnev also scored some diplomatic advances with the non-aligned world, such as a 1971 friendship pact with India, and the close relations the Soviet Union enjoyed with several Arab countries after Soviet material support in the Yom Kippur War of 1973. After his death in 1982, Brezhnev was succeeded by Yuri Andropov, who died in 1984, and then Konstantin Chernenko, who died in 1985. Andropov's brief tenure as General Secretary indicated that he might have had reformist plans, and though Chernenko put them aside, Andropov had had time to groom a group of potential reformist successors, one of whom was Mikhail Gorbachev. It was also during Andropov's tenure and this period of generational turmoil that the rule of Communists next door, in Poland, came under challenge from Solidarność, or Solidarity, a labour union under the leadership of Lech Wałęsa. The union was sufficiently threatening to the government that on 13 December 1981, the head of state, Wojciech Jaruzelski declared martial law, suspended the union, and imprisoned most of its leaders.

=== China ===
Through the Second World War, the Chinese Communist Party (CCP) under the leadership of Mao Zedong and the Nationalist government of Chiang Kai-shek lived in an uneasy truce in order to combat the common foe, the Japanese occupation. Upon the Surrender of Japan, the Chinese Civil War immediately resumed. Another truce, negotiated by American general George C. Marshall early in 1946, collapsed after only three months. While war raged in the Republic of China, two post-occupation governments established themselves next door, in Korea. In 1948, Syngman Rhee was proclaimed president of the Republic of Korea (South Korea), at Seoul, while the Communist Workers Party of North Korea in the north proclaimed the establishment of the Democratic People's Republic of Korea (North Korea).

In January 1949, the Republic of China Armed Forces suffered a devastating defeat by the Communist People's Liberation Army at Tientsin. By spring, Chiang Kai-shek, now losing whole divisions by desertion to the Communists, began the removal of remaining forces to Formosa (Taiwan). In August, U.S. aid to the Nationalists ended due to Chiang's regime, which was corruption. In October, Mao Zedong took office as the Chairman of the Central People's Administrative Council of the People's Republic of China in Beijing. Zhou Enlai was named premier and foreign minister of the new state. The nascent People's Republic did not yet control all of the territory of the Republic of China. Mao declared it his goal in 1950 to "liberate" Hainan, Tibet, and Formosa, and while he accomplished that of the first two, the third was interrupted: On 25 June 1950, the Korean People's Army invaded South Korea unleashing the Korean War. The United States Seventh Fleet was summarily dispatched to protect Formosa from a mainland Red Chinese invasion. Although Mao was apparently unenthusiastic about that war, a Chinese volunteer force entered the Korean War in November.

Claiming a victory against colonialism in the Korean War stalemate, the Communist government in China settled down to the consolidation of domestic power. During the 1950s, they redistributed land, established the Anti-Rightist Movement, and attempted mass industrialisation, with technical assistance from the Soviet Union. By the mid-1950s, after an armistice in Korea and the surrender of French Union forces in the First Indochina War, China's borders were secure. Mao's internal power base was likewise secured by the imprisonment of those he called "left-wing oppositionists". As the 1950s ended, Mao became discontented with the status quo. On the one hand, he saw the Soviet Union attempting "peaceful co-existence" with the imperialist Western powers of NATO, and he believed China could be the centre of worldwide revolution only by breaking with Moscow. (Mao viewed then-Soviet leader Nikita Khrushchev as a revisionist and a traitor to socialism.) On the other hand, he was dissatisfied with the economic consequences of the revolution thus far, and believed the country had to enter into a program of planned rapid industrialisation known as the Great Leap Forward.

The economic planning of the Great Leap period focused on steel – because steel was considered emblematic of industry. The government arranged to have small backyard steel furnaces built in communes, in the hope that the mobilisation of the entire populace would compensate for the absence of the usual economies of scale. During this period, Mao stepped down as head of state in favour of Liu Shaoqi, but Mao remained Chairman of the Chinese Communist Party. The rushed program of industrialisation was a disaster. It diverted labour and resources from agriculture to marginally productive cottage industry and so contributed to years of the Great Chinese Famine. It also caused a loss of Mao's influence upon the Communist Party and government apparatus. Modernisers such as Liu and Deng Xiaoping sought to relegate him to the status of figurehead. Mao was not ready to be a figurehead. In the early 1960s he gathered around himself the so-called "Shanghai Mafia" consisting of his fourth wife, Jiang Qing (a.k.a. "Madame Mao"), as well as Lin Biao, Chen Boda, and Yao Wenyuan, unleashing the Cultural Revolution.

In the People's Republic of China (PRC) since 1967, the terms Ultra-Left and left communist refers to political theory and practice self-defined as further "left" than that of the central Maoist leaders at the height of the Cultural Revolution. The terms are also used retroactively to describe some early 20th century Chinese anarchist orientations. As a slur, the Chinese Communist Party (CCP) has used the term "ultra-left" more broadly to denounce any orientation it considers further "left" than the party line. According to the latter usage, in 1978 the Central Committee of the Chinese Communist Party denounced as "ultra-left" the line of Mao Zedong from 1956 until his death in 1976. "Ultra-Left" refers to those Cultural Revolution rebel positions that diverged from the central Maoist line by identifying an antagonistic contradiction between the CCP-PRC party-state itself and the masses of workers and "peasants" conceived as a single proletarian class divorced from any meaningful control over production or distribution. Whereas the central Maoist line maintained that the masses controlled the means of production through the Party's mediation, the Ultra-Left argued that the objective interests of bureaucrats were structurally determined by the centralist state-form in direct opposition to the objective interests of the masses, regardless of however "red" a given bureaucrat's "thought" might be. Whereas the central Maoist leaders encouraged the masses to criticise reactionary "ideas" and "habits" among the alleged 5% of bad cadres, giving them a chance to "turn over a new leaf" after they had undergone "thought reform," the Ultra-Left argued that "cultural revolution" had to give way to "political revolution" – "in which one class overthrows another class".

== Late 20th century and early 21st century (1980s–2000s) ==
=== Final years for the Soviet Union ===
Mikhail Gorbachev (born 1931), who took control in 1985, was the first Soviet leader to have been born after the October revolution. He is remembered for three initiatives: glasnost, perestroika, and the "Frank Sinatra doctrine". Glasnost, or "openness", was Gorbachev's term for allowing public debate in the Soviet Union to an unprecedented degree. Perestroika was his term for market-oriented economic reforms, in recognition of the stagnating effects of central planning. The "Frank Sinatra" doctrine was his reversal of the Brezhnev doctrine. Sinatra sang "My Way", and the doctrine named for him was that each Warsaw Pact country could find its own "way" of doing things.

In 1989, Gorbachev also withdrew Soviet troops from their engagement in Afghanistan, ten years after Brezhnev had sent them there. They had been fighting the anti-government Mujahideen forces which since 1979 as part of its cold war strategy had been covertly funded and trained by the United States government through the Pakistani secret service known as Inter Services Intelligence (ISI). By August 1991, anti-reform Communists in both the Communist Party and the Soviet Armed Forces were sufficiently desperate to attempt a military coup. Coup leaders called themselves the State Committee on the State of Emergency. They announced that Gorbachev had been removed from his position as President of the Soviet Union due to illness. Although the coup rapidly collapsed and Gorbachev returned to Moscow, it was Boris Yeltsin who had played a leading role in the street resistance to that Committee, and the incident marked a shift of power away from Gorbachev toward Yeltsin. By the end of that year, Yeltsin was the President of Russia, and the Soviet Union was no more.

=== Socialism in China since the Cultural Revolution ===
In 1965, Wenyuan wrote a thinly veiled attack on the deputy mayor of Beijing, Wu Han. Over the six months that followed, on behalf of ideological purity, Mao and his supporters purged many public figures, Liu Shao-chi among them. By the middle of 1966, Mao had not only put himself back into the centre of things, he had initiated what is known as the Cultural Revolution, a mass and army-supported action against the Communist Party apparatus itself on behalf of a renovated conception of Communism. Chaos continued throughout China for three years, particularly due to the agitations of the Red Guards until the CCP's ninth congress in 1969, when Lin Biao emerged as the primary military figure, and the presumptive heir to Mao in the party. In the months that followed, Lin Biao restored domestic order, while diplomatic efforts by Zhou Enlai cooled border tensions with the Soviet Union. Lin Biao died under mysterious circumstances in 1971. Mao's final years saw a notable thaw in the People's Republic's relations with the United States, the period of "Ping Pong Diplomacy". Mao died in 1976, and almost immediately his ideological heirs, the Gang of Four lost a power struggle to more "pragmatic" figures such as Deng Xiaoping. The term "pragmatic" is often used in media accounts of these factional struggles but should not be confused with the philosophy of pragmatism proper.

Deng launched the "Beijing Spring", allowing open criticism of the excesses and suffering that had occurred during the Cultural Revolution period. He also eliminated the class-background system, under which the communist regime had limited employment opportunities available to people deemed associated with the pre-revolutionary landlord class. Although Deng's only official title in the early 1980s was chairman of the central military commission of the CP, he was widely regarded as the central figure in the nation's politics. In that period, Zhao Ziyang became premier and Hu Yaobang became head of the party. Near the end of that decade, the death of Hu Yaobang sparked a mass demonstration of mourning students in Tiananmen Square, Beijing. The mourning soon turned into a call for greater responsiveness and liberalisation, and the demonstration was captured live on cameras to be broadcast around the world. On May 30, 1989, students erected the "Goddess of Democracy" statue, which looked a bit like Lady Liberty in New York Harbor. On 4 June 1989 under the orders of Deng Xiaoping, troops and tanks of the People's Liberation Army ended the protest. Thousands were killed in the resultant massacre.

By the start of the 21st century, though, the leadership of China was embarked upon a program of market-based reform that was more sweeping than had been Soviet leader Gorbachev's perestroika program of the late 1980s, which is traceable to Deng's Socialism with Chinese characteristics. It is in this context that Leo Melamed, chairman emeritus and senior policy adviser to the Chicago Mercantile Exchange, spoke to the 2003 Beijing Forum on China and East Asian Prospects of Financial Cooperation on September 23. He said that the CME applauds the National People's Congress for recognising their country's need for additional trading in futures contracts.

=== 21st-century socialism in Latin America ===
Since the 1998 election of Hugo Chávez as president in Venezuela and the beginnings of his "Bolivarian Revolution" aimed at creating greater equality, Latin American nations saw a tide of democratically elected socialist and centre-left governments emerge. They have been elected in increasing numbers as the poor and middle classes of many countries have become increasingly disillusioned with the neoliberal economic policies still encouraged by the United States and as a very large gap continues to exist between rich and poor, denying millions of people basic opportunities and necessities. A long and very controversial history of U.S. military and political intervention in the region dating back to the 19th century severely tarnished the image of the United States in the eyes of many Latin Americans and shapes governments' policies to this day. An example of the influence of the aforementioned sentiment was the Latin American and Caribbean Congress in Solidarity with Puerto Rico's Independence, an international summit held at Panama City, Panama, in which fifteen incumbent political parties (in government) requested that the United States "relinquish its colonial rule over said island-nation and recognise Puerto Rico's independence". Chavez is joined by the democratic socialist president of Bolivia, Evo Morales (that nation's first indigenous leader), who adopted strong reformist agendas and attracted overwhelming majority electoral victories. The democratically elected president of Ecuador, Rafael Correa was also an ally of Chavez. Correa describes himself as a humanist, Christian of the left and proponent of socialism of the 21st century.

A number of centre-left/social democratic presidents also came to power in Latin American countries promising a greater redistribution of wealth within the framework of the free market. They included Cristina Fernández de Kirchner of Argentina, Michelle Bachelet of Chile, Tabaré Vázquez of Uruguay, Alan García of Peru, Álvaro Colom in Guatemala and Fernando Lugo of Paraguay. In Brazil Lula da Silva and his The Workers Party were in power for 13 years. In Nicaragua's 2006 elections the former Sandinista President Daniel Ortega was re-elected President after having been out of office since 1990. In Colombia's previous presidential elections, Carlos Gaviria Díaz of the socialist Alternative Democratic Pole came in second place to Álvaro Uribe of Colombia First, a conservative party. In Peru's 2006 presidential election Alan García's main challenger was Ollanta Humala of the Union for Peru, a left-wing Peruvian nationalist with close ties to Chávez. In El Salvador, the FMLN a former left-wing guerrilla group which once fought against a military dictatorship became the official opposition to the Salvadoran government.

Other parts of the developing world also saw a rise in radical socialist parties and movements. In Nepal following the end of the Civil War in 2006, the formerly militant Communist Party of Nepal (Maoist) and the more moderate Communist Party of Nepal (Unified Marxist-Leninist) have emerged as the two most powerful opposition parties in the country. In Nepal's 2008 Constituent Assembly elections the Maoists emerged as the largest party allowing them to form an interim government. Their leader, Prachanda vowed to respect multiparty democracy. In some of the poorest parts of India, the Communist Party of India (Maoist) has also been fighting the violent Naxalite–Maoist insurgency against the Government of India and controls the "red corridor"; a similar rebellion is being waged by the Maoist, New People's Army in the Philippines.

== 21st century (2000–modern day) ==
=== Emergence of a New Left in the developed world ===
In many developed nations, the rise of Third Way policies and the increase in capitalism and free-market economies has led to the rise of many new socialist parties. They include Sinn Féin in the Republic of Ireland and Northern Ireland (representing the Nationalist constituency of Northern Ireland), The Left of Germany, Syriza in Greece, Podemos in Spain, Left Party of Sweden, Left Alliance of Finland, New Zealand Progressive Party, Socialist Party of Ireland, Socialist Party of the Netherlands, Respect Party of the United Kingdom, Scottish Socialist Party and Québec solidaire in the Canadian province of Quebec.

Many social democratic parties, particularly after the Cold War, adopted neoliberal market policies including privatisation, deregulation and financialisation. They abandoned their pursuit of moderate socialism in favour of economic liberalism. By the 1980s, with the rise of conservative neoliberal politicians such as Ronald Reagan in the United States, Margaret Thatcher in Britain, Brian Mulroney in Canada and Augusto Pinochet in Chile, the Western welfare state was dismantled from within, but state support for the corporate sector was maintained.

Around the turn of the 21st century, anarchism grew in popularity and influence as part of the anti-war, anti-capitalist, and anti-globalisation movements. Anarchists became known for their involvement in protests against the meetings of the World Trade Organization (WTO), Group of Eight, and the World Economic Forum. Some anarchist factions at these protests engaged in rioting, property destruction, and violent confrontations with police, and the confrontations were selectively portrayed in mainstream media coverage as violent riots. These actions were precipitated by ad hoc, leaderless, anonymous cadres known as black blocs; other organisational tactics pioneered in this time include security culture, affinity groups and the use of decentralised technologies such as the internet. A landmark struggle of this period was the confrontations at WTO conference in Seattle in 1999. International anarchist federations in existence include the International of Anarchist Federations, the International Workers' Association, and International Libertarian Solidarity.

The Progressive Alliance is a political international founded on May 22, 2013 by political parties, the majority of whom are current or former members of the Socialist International. The organisation states the aim of becoming the global network of "the progressive, democratic, social-democratic, socialist and labour movement".

=== Africa ===
In South Africa the African National Congress (ANC) abandoned its partial socialist allegiances after taking power and followed a standard neoliberal route. From 2005 through to 2007, the country was wracked by many thousands of protests from poor communities. One of these gave rise to a mass movement of shack dwellers, Abahlali baseMjondolo that despite major police suppression continues to work for popular people's planning and against the creation of a market economy in land and housing.

=== Asia ===
In Asia, states with socialist economies—such as the People's Republic of China, North Korea, Laos and Vietnam—have largely moved away from centralised economic planning in the 21st century, placing a greater emphasis on markets. Forms include the Chinese socialist market economy and the Vietnamese socialist-oriented market economy. They use state-owned corporate management models as opposed to modelling socialist enterprise on traditional management styles employed by government agencies. In China living standards continued to improve rapidly despite the Great Recession, but centralised political control remained tight.

Although the authority of the state remained unchallenged under Đổi Mới, the government of Vietnam encourages private ownership of farms and factories, economic deregulation and foreign investment, while maintaining control over strategic industries. The Vietnamese economy subsequently achieved strong growth in agricultural and industrial production, construction, exports and foreign investment. However, these reforms have also caused a rise in income inequality and gender disparities.

Elsewhere in Asia, some elected socialist parties and communist parties remain prominent, particularly in India and Nepal. Communist Party of Nepal (Unified Marxist–Leninist) in particular calls for multi-party democracy, social equality and economic prosperity. In Singapore, a majority of the GDP is still generated from the state sector comprising government-linked companies. In Japan, there has been a resurgent interest in the Japanese Communist Party among workers and youth. In Malaysia, the Socialist Party of Malaysia got its first Member of Parliament, Michael Jeyakumar Devaraj, after the 2008 general election. In 2010, there were 270 kibbutzim in Israel. Their factories and farms account for 9% of Israel's industrial output, worth US$8 billion and 40% of its agricultural output, worth over $1.7 billion. Some Kibbutzim had also developed substantial high-tech and military industries. Also in 2010, Kibbutz Sasa, containing some 200 members, generated $850 million in annual revenue from its military-plastics industry.

=== Europe ===
The United Nations World Happiness Report 2013 shows that the happiest nations are concentrated in Northern Europe, where the Nordic model is employed, with Denmark topping the list. This is at times attributed to the success of the Nordic model in the region that has been labelled social democratic in contrast with the conservative continental model and the liberal Anglo-American model. The Nordic countries ranked highest on the metrics of real GDP per capita, healthy life expectancy, having someone to count on, perceived freedom to make life choices, generosity and freedom from corruption.

The objectives of the Party of European Socialists (PES), the European Parliament's socialist and social democratic bloc, are now "to pursue international aims in respect of the principles on which the European Union is based, namely principles of freedom, equality, solidarity, democracy, respect of Human Rights and Fundamental Freedoms, and respect for the Rule of Law". As a result, today the rallying cry of the French Revolution—Liberté, égalité, fraternité—is promoted as essential socialist values. To the left of the PES at the European level is the Party of the European Left (PEL), also commonly abbreviated "European Left"), which is a political party at the European level and an association of democratic socialist, socialist and communist political parties in the European Union and other European countries. It was formed in January 2004 for the purposes of running in the 2004 European Parliament elections. PEL was founded on 8–9 May 2004 in Rome. Elected MEPs from member parties of the European Left sit in the European United Left–Nordic Green Left (GUE/NGL) group in the European parliament.

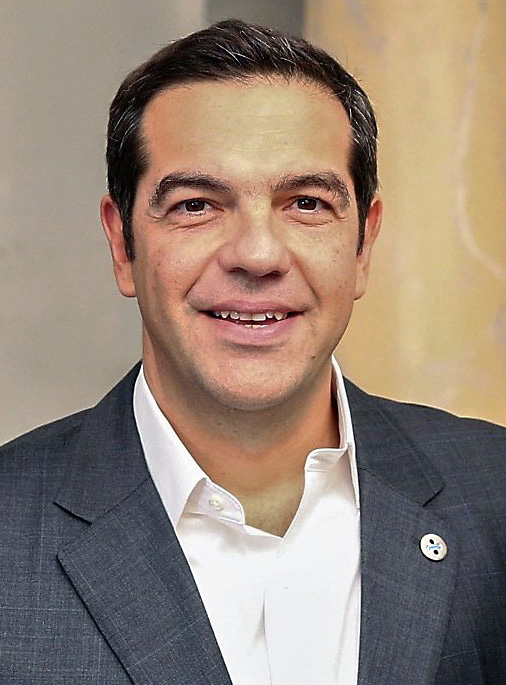
Alexis Tsipras, socialist Prime Minister of Greece who led the Coalition of the Radical Left (SYRIZA) through a victory in the January 2015 Greek legislative election

The socialist Left Party in Germany grew in popularity due to dissatisfaction with the increasingly neoliberal policies of the SPD, becoming the fourth biggest party in parliament in the general election on 27 September 2009. Communist candidate Dimitris Christofias won a crucial presidential runoff in the 2008 Cypriot presidential election, defeating his conservative rival with a majority of 53%. In Ireland, in the 2009 European election Joe Higgins of the Socialist Party took one of three seats in the capital Dublin European constituency. In Denmark, the Socialist People's Party (SF) more than doubled its parliamentary representation to 23 seats from 11, making it the fourth largest party. In the 2011 Danish general election, the Social Democrats, Socialist People's Party and the Danish Social Liberal Party formed government, after a slight victory over the main rival political coalition. They were led by Helle Thorning-Schmidt, and had the Red-Green Alliance as a supporting party. In Norway, the Red-Green Coalition consists of the Labour Party (Ap), the Socialist Left Party (SV) and the Centre Party (Sp) and governed the country as a majority government from the 2005 general election until 2013.

In the Greek legislative election of January 2015, the Coalition of the Radical Left (SYRIZA) led by Alexis Tsipras won a legislative election for the first time while the Communist Party of Greece won 15 seats in parliament. SYRIZA has been characterised as an anti-establishment party, whose success has sent "shock-waves across the EU".

In the United Kingdom, the National Union of Rail, Maritime and Transport Workers put forward a slate of candidates in the 2009 European Parliament elections under the banner of No to EU – Yes to Democracy, a broad left-wing alter-globalisation coalition involving socialist groups such as the Socialist Party, aiming to offer an alternative to the "anti-foreigner" and pro-business policies of the UK Independence Party. In the following May 2010 United Kingdom general election, the Trade Unionist and Socialist Coalition, launched in January 2010 and backed by Bob Crow, the leader of the National Union of Rail, Maritime and Transport Workers (RMT), other union leaders and the Socialist Party among other socialist groups, stood against Labour in 40 constituencies. The Trade Unionist and Socialist Coalition contested the 2011 local elections, having gained the endorsement of the RMT June 2010 conference, but gained no seats. Left Unity was also founded in 2013 after the film director Ken Loach appealed for a new party of the left to replace the Labour Party, which he claimed had failed to oppose austerity and had shifted towards neoliberalism. In 2015, following a defeat at the 2015 United Kingdom general election, self-described socialist Jeremy Corbyn took over from Ed Miliband as leader of the Labour Party, but when Corbyn lost to Boris Johnson Labour moved to the right.

In France, Olivier Besancenot, the Revolutionary Communist League (LCR) candidate in the 2007 presidential election, received 1,498,581 votes, 4.08%, double that of the communist candidate. The LCR abolished itself in 2009 to initiate a broad anti-capitalist party, the New Anticapitalist Party, whose stated aim is to "build a new socialist, democratic perspective for the twenty-first century". On 25 May 2014, the Spanish left-wing party Podemos entered candidates for the 2014 European parliamentary elections, some of which were unemployed. In a surprise result, it polled 7.98% of the vote and thus was awarded five seats out of 54 while the older United Left was the third largest overall force obtaining 10.03% and 5 seats, 4 more than the previous elections. The government of Portugal established on 26 November 2015 was a Socialist Party (PS) minority government led by prime minister António Costa, who succeeded in securing support for a Socialist minority government by the Left Bloc (B.E.), the Portuguese Communist Party (PCP) and the Ecologist Party "The Greens" (PEV). All around Europe and in some places of Latin America there exists a social centre and squatting movement mainly inspired by autonomist and anarchist ideas.

=== North America ===
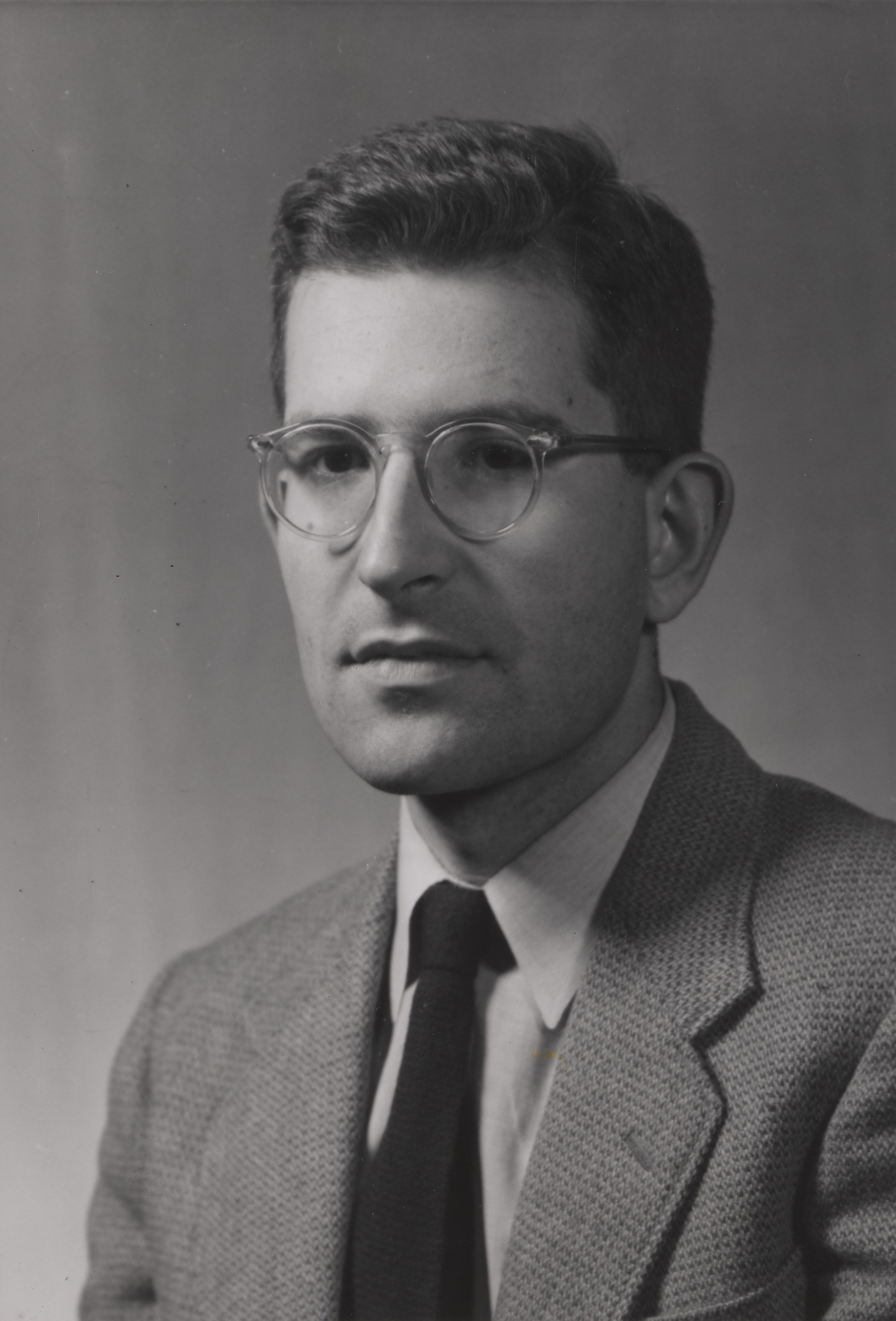
Noam Chomsky, an American libertarian socialist

According to a 2013 article in The Guardian, "[c]ontrary to popular belief, Americans don't have an innate allergy to socialism. Milwaukee has had several socialist mayors (Frank Zeidler, Emil Seidel and Daniel Hoan), and there is currently an independent socialist in the US Senate, Bernie Sanders of Vermont". Sanders, once mayor of Vermont's largest city, Burlington, has described himself as a democratic socialist and has praised Scandinavian-style social democracy. In 2016, Sanders made a bid for the Democratic Party presidential candidate, thereby gaining considerable popular support, particularly among the younger generation, but lost the 2016 Democratic Party presidential primaries to Hillary Clinton. As of 2019, the Democratic Socialists of America have two members in the United States Congress, and various members in state legislatures and city councils. According to a 2018 Gallup poll, 37% of American adults have a positive view of socialism, including 57% of Democrat-leaning voters and 16% of Republican-leaning voters. A 2019 YouGov poll found that 7 out of 10 millennials would vote for a socialist presidential candidate, and 36% had a favorable view of communism. An earlier 2019 Harris Poll found that socialism is more popular with women than men, with 55% of women between the ages of 18 and 54 preferring to live in a socialist society while a majority of men surveyed in the poll chose capitalism over socialism.

Anti-capitalism, anarchism and the anti-globalisation movement rose to prominence through events such as protests against the World Trade Organization Ministerial Conference of 1999 in Seattle. Socialist-inspired groups played an important role in these movements, which nevertheless embraced much broader layers of the population and were championed by figures such as Noam Chomsky. In Canada, the Co-operative Commonwealth Federation (CCF), the precursor to the social democratic New Democratic Party (NDP), had significant success in provincial politics. In 1944, the Saskatchewan CCF formed the first socialist government in North America. At the federal level, the NDP was the Official Opposition, from 2011 through 2015.

In their Johnson linguistics column, The Economist opines that in the 21st century United States, the term socialism, without clear definition, has become a pejorative used by conservatives to attack liberal and progressive policies, proposals, and public figures.

=== Latin America and the Caribbean ===
For the Encyclopedia Britannica, "the attempt by Salvador Allende to unite Marxists and other reformers in a socialist reconstruction of Chile is most representative of the direction that Latin American socialists have taken since the late 20th century.... Several socialist (or socialist-leaning) leaders have followed Allende's example in winning election to office in Latin American countries". The success of the Workers' Party (Portuguese: Partido dos Trabalhadores – PT) of Brazil, formed in 1980 and governing Brazil from 2003 to 2016, was the first major breakthrough for this trend.

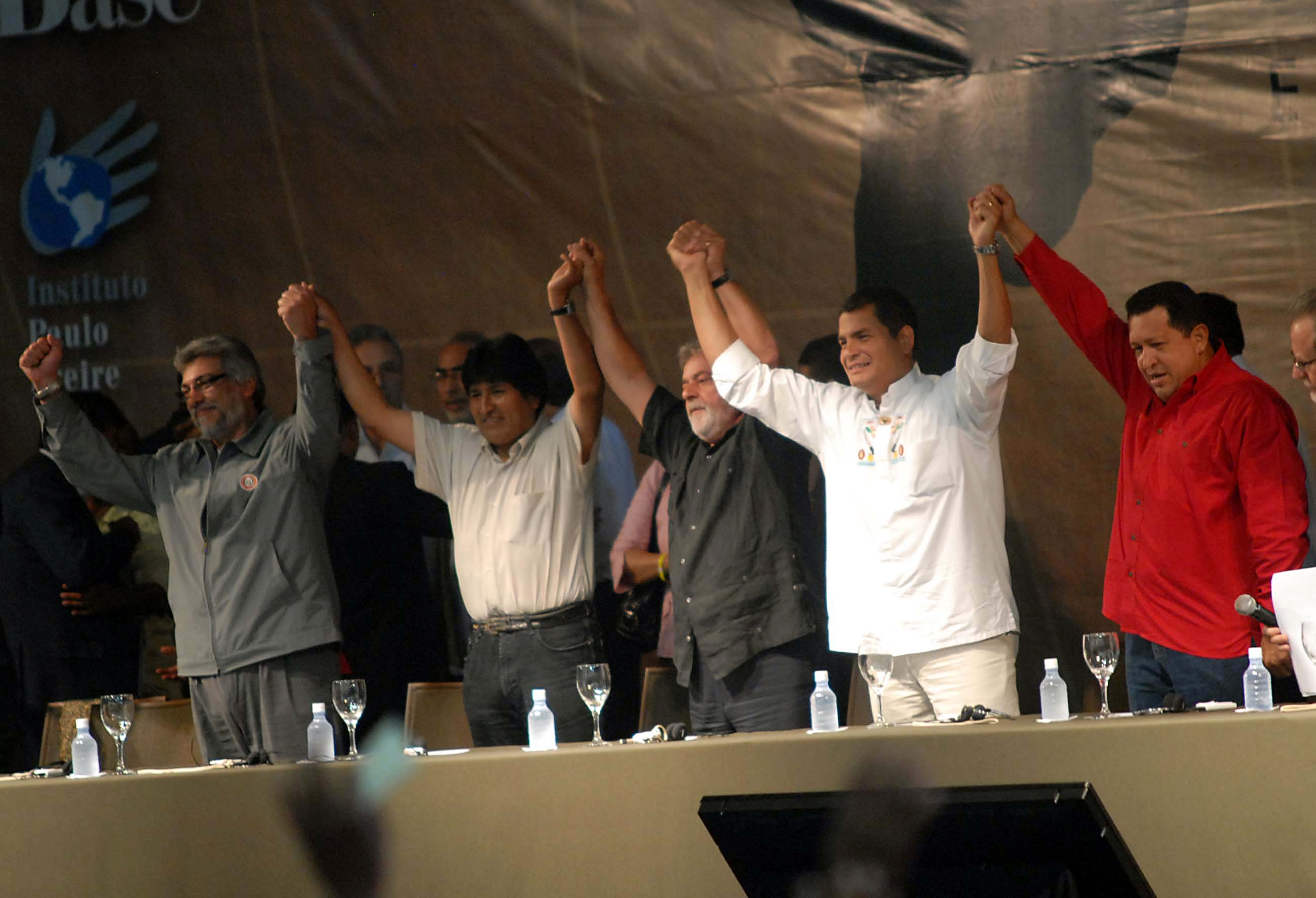
Presidents Fernando Lugo of Paraguay, Evo Morales of Bolivia, Luiz Inácio Lula da Silva of Brazil, Rafael Correa of Ecuador and Hugo Chávez of Venezuela in World Social Forum for Latin America

Foro de São Paulo is a conference of leftist political parties and other organisations from Latin America and the Caribbean. It was launched by the Workers' Party in 1990 in the city of São Paulo, after the PT approached other parties and social movements of Latin America and the Caribbean with the objective of debating the new international scenario after the fall of the Berlin Wall and the consequences of the implementation of what were taken as neoliberal policies adopted at the time by contemporary right-leaning governments in the region, the stated main objective of the conference being to argue for alternatives to neoliberalism. Among its members have been socialist and social-democratic parties in government in the region such as Mexico's MORENA Party, Bolivia's Movement for Socialism, the Communist Party of Cuba, Ecuador's PAIS Alliance, the United Socialist Party of Venezuela, the Socialist Party of Chile, Uruguay's Broad Front, Nicaragua's Sandinista National Liberation Front, El Salvador's Farabundo Martí National Liberation Front and members of Argentina's Frente de Todos.

In the first decade of the 21st century, Venezuelan President Hugo Chávez, Nicaraguan President Daniel Ortega, Bolivian President Evo Morales and Ecuadorian president Rafael Correa referred to their political programmes as socialist, and Chávez adopted the term "socialism of the 21st century". After winning re-election in December 2006, Chávez said: "Now more than ever, I am obliged to move Venezuela's path towards socialism". Chávez was also reelected in October 2012 for his third six-year term as president, but he died in March 2013 from cancer. After Chávez's death on 5 March 2013, Vice President from Chávez's party Nicolás Maduro assumed the powers and responsibilities of the President. A special election was held on 14 April of the same year to elect a new president, which Maduro won by a tight margin as the candidate of the United Socialist Party of Venezuela and he was formally inaugurated on 19 April. Pink tide is a term used in political analysis, in the media and elsewhere to describe the perception that leftist ideology in general and left-wing politics in particular were increasingly influential in Latin America in the 2000s. Some of the pink tide governments were criticised for turning from socialism to populism and authoritarianism. The pink tide was followed in the 2010s by a "conservative wave" as right-wing governments came to power in Argentina, Brazil and Chile, and Venezuela and Nicaragua experienced political crises. However, socialism saw a resurgence in 2018–19 after successive electoral victories of left-wing and centre-left candidates in Mexico, Panama, and Argentina.

=== Oceania ===
Australia saw an increase in interest of socialism in the early 21st century, especially amongst youth. It is strongest in Victoria, where three socialist parties have merged into the Victorian Socialists, who aim to address problems in housing and public transportation.

In New Zealand, socialism emerged within the budding trade union movement during the late 19th century and early 20th century. In July 1916, several left-wing political organisations and trade unions merged to form the New Zealand Labour Party. While Labour traditionally had a socialist orientation, the party shifted towards a more social democratic orientation during the 1920s and 1930s. Following the 1935 general election, the First Labour Government pursued socialist policies such as nationalising industry, broadcasting, transportation, and implementing a Keynesian welfare state. However, the party did not seek to abolish capitalism, instead opting for a mixed economy. Labour's welfare state and mixed economy were not challenged until the 1980s. During the 1980s, the Fourth Labour Government implemented a raft of neoliberal economic reforms known as Rogernomics which saw New Zealand society and the economy shift towards a more free market model. Labour's abandonment of its traditional values fractured the party. Successive Labour governments have since pursued centre-left social and economic policies while maintaining a free-market economy. The former Prime Minister of New Zealand Jacinda Ardern formerly served as President of the International Union of Socialist Youth. Ardern is a self-described social democrat who has criticized capitalism as a "blatant failure" due to high levels of homelessness and low wages. New Zealand still has a small socialist scene, mainly dominated by Trotskyist groups.

Melanesian socialism developed in the 1980s, inspired by African socialism. It aims to achieve full independence from Britain and France in Melanesian territories and creation of a Melanesian federal union. It is very popular with the New Caledonia independence movement.

== See also ==
- Anti-communism
- Authoritarian socialism
- Communist state
- Ethical socialism
- History of anarchism
- History of communism
- History of democratic socialism
- History of social democracy
- History of socialism in Canada
- History of socialism in France
- History of socialism in the United Kingdom
- List of anti-capitalist and communist parties with national parliamentary representation
- List of communist parties
- List of democratic socialist parties and organisations
- List of democratic socialist parties which have governed
- List of social democratic parties
- List of socialist states
- Pre-Marxist communism
- Socialism in liberal democratic constitutions
- Socialism in the United States
- Socialist state
- State socialism
- Welfare State
