= History of communism =

The history of communism encompasses a wide variety of ideologies and political movements sharing the core principles of common ownership of wealth, economic enterprise, and property. Most modern forms of communism are grounded at least nominally in Marxism, a theory and method conceived by Karl Marx and Friedrich Engels during the 19th century. Marxism subsequently gained a widespread following across much of Europe, and throughout the late 1800s its militant supporters were instrumental in a number of unsuccessful revolutions on that continent. During the same era, there was also a proliferation of communist parties which rejected armed revolution, but embraced the Marxist ideal of collective property and a classless society.

Although Marxist theory suggested that industrial societies were the most suitable places for social revolution (either through peaceful transition or by force of arms), communism was mostly successful in underdeveloped countries with endemic poverty such as the Republic of China. In 1917, the Bolshevik Party seized power during the Russian Revolution and in 1922 created the Soviet Union, the world's first self-declared socialist state. The Bolsheviks thoroughly embraced the concept of proletarian internationalism and world revolution, seeing their struggle as an international rather than a purely regional cause. This was to have a phenomenal impact on the spread of communism during the 20th century as the Soviet Union installed new Marxist–Leninist governments in Central and Eastern Europe following World War II and indirectly backed the ascension of others in the Americas, Asia and Africa. Pivotal to this policy was the Communist International, also known as the Comintern, formed with the perspective of aiding and assisting communist parties around the world and fostering revolution. This was one major cause of tensions during the Cold War as the United States and its military allies equated the global spread of communism with Soviet expansionism by proxy.

By 1985, one-third of the world's population lived under a Marxist–Leninist system of government. However, there was significant debate among communist and Marxist ideologues as to whether most of these countries could be meaningfully considered Marxist since many of the basic components of the Marxist system were altered and revised by such countries. There was a rapid decline of communism in the late 1980s and early 1990s, including the dissolution of the Soviet Union in 1991 and several other Marxist–Leninist states repudiating or abolishing the ideology altogether. Later historians have proposed different explanations for this decline, including arguments that Marxist–Leninist governments failed to live up to the ideal of a communist society, that there was a general trend towards increasing authoritarianism, that they suffered from excessive bureaucracy, and that they had inefficiencies in their economies. As of the 21st century, only a small number of Marxist–Leninist states remain, namely China, Cuba, Laos, North Korea and Vietnam. With the exception of North Korea, all of these states have started allowing more economic competition while maintaining one-party rule.

== Origins of communism ==
=== Communism in antiquity ===
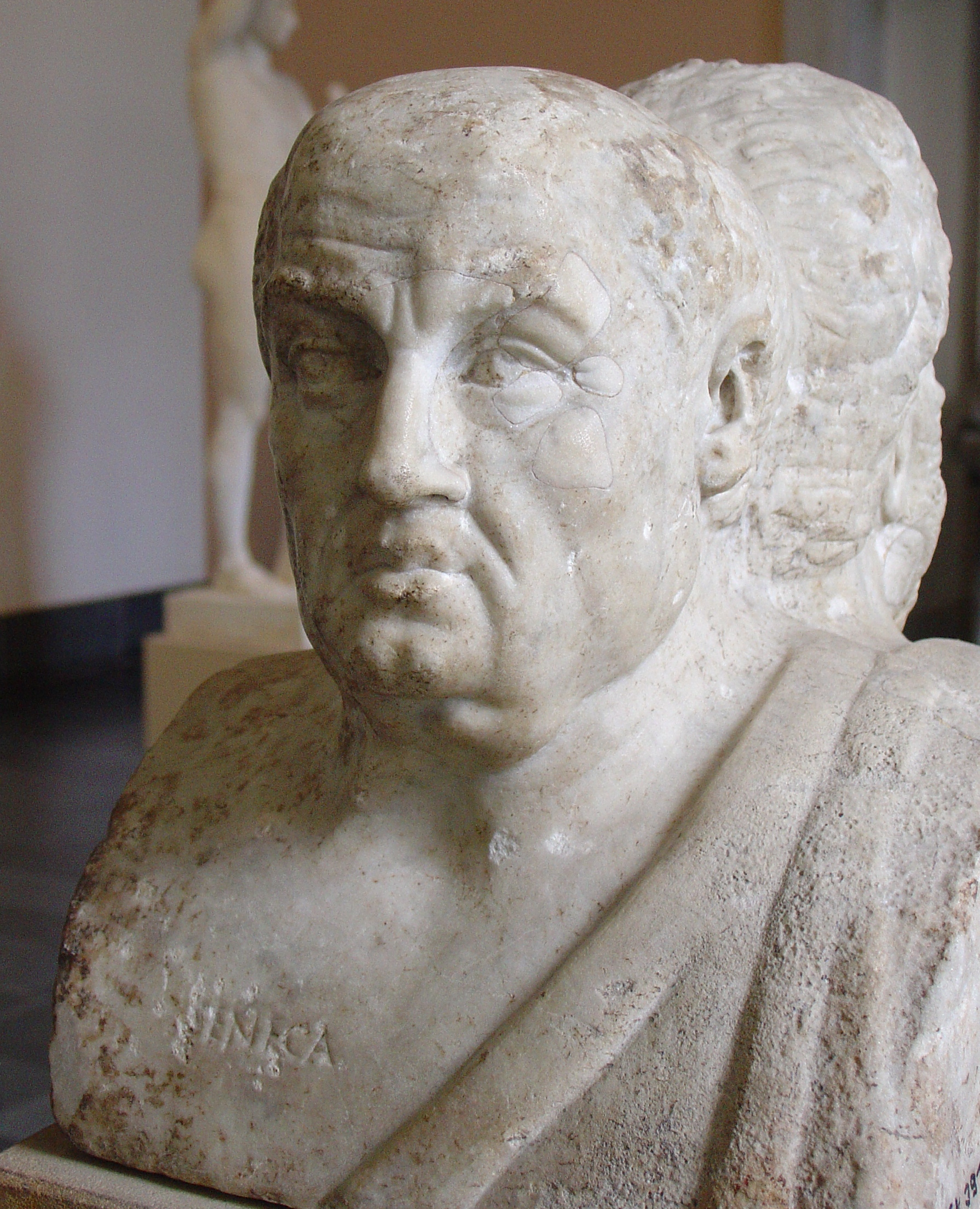
The 1st century BC Roman philosopher Seneca believed that humans had fallen from a Golden Age of primitive communism

Many historical groups have been considered as following forms of communism. Karl Marx and other early communist theorists believed that hunter-gatherer societies as were found in the Paleolithic through to horticultural societies as found in the Chalcolithic were essentially egalitarian and he, therefore, termed their ideology to be primitive communism.

Around the late 5th century BC in Ancient Greece, ideas similar to communism were parodied by the dramatist Aristophanes in his comedy The Assemblywomen in which the women of Athens seize control of the Ecclesia (city government) and abolish all private property while making the sharing of women and the collective rearing of children mandatory. In Plato's Republic, Socrates declares that an ideal state would eliminate all forms of private property among the elite of society to the extent that even children and wives are shared. He asserts that such practices would prevent internal conflict within a society and promote a sense of unity and common identity.

One of the first writers to espouse a belief in the primitive communism of the past was the Roman Stoic philosopher Seneca who stated," How happy was the primitive age when the bounties of nature lay in common...They held all nature in common which gave them secure possession of the public wealth." Because of this he believed that such primitive societies were the richest as there was no poverty. Other Greco-Roman writers that believed in a prehistoric humanity that practiced communism include Diodorus Siculus, Virgil, and Ovid. Similarly the early Church Fathers, like their pagan predecessors, maintained that humans society had declined to its current state from a now lost egalitarian social order.

Around AD 500 in Iran, the Zoroastrian reformist Mazdak purportedly founded a movement preaching religious communism while under the patronage of the Sassanian King Kavad I who initially supported the priest and his reforms, but later had the Mazdakians repressed and Mazdak executed.

The Inca Empire was regarded by the Peruvian Marxist José Carlos Mariátegui as communist, describing it as "the most advanced primitive communist organization that history records." According to Robert Marett (diplomat), Mariátegui believed that

Inca society was a golden age in which the Indians, practising a primitive form of agrarian communism, provided everything that was needed for their own good life as well as a sufficient surplus to support the superstructure of the Inca state. But the Spanish conquest had destroyed this harmonious state of affairs. An agricultural economy which had been nicely geared to meet the needs of the Indians was now supplanted by an alien feudal system from which only the Spanish and creole landowners benefited; the old communal system of agriculture survived only in the more remote and poor regions of the Andes.

As another study has said of Incan society

They had no currency, as it was known for instance in the states of contemporary Europe. Yet by a well-tuned system of exchange and redistribution, they managed to maintain a flourishing economy in which young and old, able-bodied and handicapped, all had their place and were assured of a sufficient living.

In their 1848 Communist Manifesto, Marx and Engels give examples of societies that can be regarded as primitive communist ones:

In 1837, the prehistory of society, the social organization existing previous to recorded history, was all but unknown. Since then [August von] Haxthausen discovered common ownership of land in Russia, [Georg Ludwig von] Maurer proved it to be the social foundation from which all Teutonic races started in history, and, by and by, village communities were found to be, or to have been, the primitive form of society everywhere from India to Ireland. The inner organization of this primitive communistic society was laid bare, in its typical form, by [Lewis Henry] Morgan's crowning discovery of the true nature of the gens and its relation to the tribe. With the dissolution of these primeval communities, society begins to be differentiated into separate and finally antagonistic classes.

According to one observer

In all primitive societies the soil was the joint property of the tribes, and was subject to periodical distribution among all the families, so that all might live by their labor as nature ordained. The comfort of each was thus proportioned to his energy and intelligence; no one, at any rate, was destitute of the means of subsistence, and inequality increasing from generation to generation was provided against.

=== Developments in Christian communism ===
Early Christianity supported a form of common ownership based on the teachings in the New Testament which emphasised sharing. Despite these practices falling into decline even before the Christianization of the Roman Empire, the principles of sharing property and holding goods in common continued within the Christian traditions of monasticism.

From the High Middle Ages to the early modern period in Europe, various groups supporting Christian communist and communalist ideas were occasionally adopted by reformist Christian sects. An early 12th century proto-Protestant group originating in Lyon, Kingdom of Burgundy-Arles known as the Waldensians held their property in common in accordance with the Book of Acts, but were persecuted by the Catholic Church and retreated to the Piedmont. Some Waldensians led a schism after they felt the group's leader was becoming authoritarian. With the rise of the Mendicant Orders in the 13th century groups such as the Franciscans began challenging the concept of private property to the extent it had to be defended by Pope John XXII in his 1328 papal bull Quia vir reprobus, in which he ruled that because God had gifted Adam with the Earth as his domain, the ownership of property was divinely sanctioned. Also beginning in the 13th century a lay order known as the Beghards, originating in the Low Countries, started to spread among the underprivileged groups of society, taking in members who renounced private property and dedicated themselves to communal living and pious, frugal lifestyles as artisans. Although the practices were successful enough to spread to other areas on the continent such as France and Germany, the Beghards were later repeatedly condemned by the Catholic Church. Around 1300 the Apostolic Brethren in northern Italy were taken over by Fra Dolcino who formed a sect known as the Dulcinians which advocated ending feudalism, dissolving hierarchies in the church, and holding all property in common. The 14th century English scholastic and founder of Lollardy, John Wycliffe, preached of an idealized Christian state with collective ownership and disapproved of those rejecting the, "common charity and common property of Christian men." Around the same time the revolutionary priest John Ball, who was later executed for his prominent role in the doomed Wat Tyler Rebellion allegedly declared, "things cannot go well in England, nor ever will, until all goods are held in common."

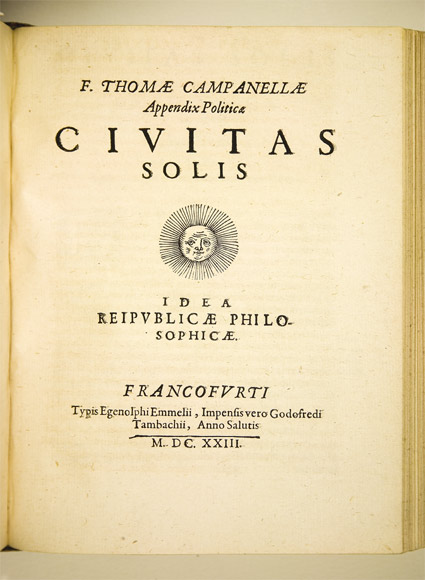
Tommaso Campanella's Civitas Solis envisioned a utopian city where private property is abolished

In Tábor, Bohemia during the 15th century Hussite Wars, the radical Taborites attempted to institute a system they called a "community of goods" where, "there is no mine or thine but all is held in common", but once initiated the scheme was quickly abandoned. They have been considered precursors of totalitarian governance while under leadership of the dictatorial Jan Želivský. After Taborite power was broken at Lipany their successors fled to Moravia forming the Moravian Church under the pacifist spiritual leader Petr Chelčický who harbored both Christian communist and Christian anarchist beliefs. The extent to which Chelčický's followers, also known as the Bohemian Brethren, adhered to his ideals, namely the abstinence from property, trade, and government, is disputed, and by the 16th century the Brethren definitely no longer embraced them. During the Protestant Reformation of the 16th century the Anabaptists, who originated in Switzerland, endorsed the communalization of goods as practiced in the Book of Acts. The most notable Anabaptist groups were the Hutterites, founded by Jacob Hutter, who settled in Moravia in the 1520s and the Münster Anabaptists who were eradicated in battle during their attempt in 1535 to forcibly convert the city of Münster into a theocratic New Jerusalem. Various groups on the side of the Roundheads during the English Civil War in the mid-17th century propagated the redistribution of wealth on an egalitarian basis, namely the Levellers and the Diggers although only the latter group under Gerrard Winstanley promoted a propertyless, communist society.

European writers began depicting idealized communist societies in utopian fiction from the 16th century onward. Inspired by largely fictional accounts of native communities in the New World, the English humanist and future Lord Chancellor Thomas More, wrote the utopian novel Utopia (1516) in which the main character decries private property after traveling to an idyllic island without money or private property and where, "everything is under state control." More coined the term utopia as a name for his idealized community, which means "nowhere" in Latin, evincing the fact that More did not consider such a society attainable in reality. Tommaso Campanella's 1601 work The City of the Sun propagated the concept of a society where the products of society should be shared equally. In Campanella's utopia all people are well educated, there is only a four-hour work day, there is no private property, the population practices eugenics to improve mental and physical fitness, most time is devoted to either leisure or self improvement, and society is managed by a ruling scientist who bases his administration on scientific principles all in the interest of benefiting society as a whole. Utopian communist societies were also described by the French writers François Fénelon and Denis Vairasse while English writer Francis Bacon wrote of a utopia that merely had a "communism in knowledge."

According to an 1894 study, the rule of the Jesuit missionaries in Paraguay formed "the most remarkable realisation of Plato's ideal state that the world has ever seen."

=== Communism during the Enlightenment ===
During the Age of Enlightenment in 18th century France, some liberal writers increasingly began to criticize the institution of private property even to the extent they demanded its abolition. One of the first secular visions for a communist society is contained within the French Catholic abbé Jean Meslier's posthumously published Testament (1729). Similarly the Abbé de Mably, also a French philosopher wrote that the individual ownership of land was the source of all mischief and that wealthy inequality brought about social ruin that could only be reversed by adopting a society based on collective ownership." He did however temper his views by surmising that any attempts at enacting true equality and communal ownership would prove to be too costly and destructive to be worth implementing. Another French thinker, Étienne-Gabriel Morelly also contended that private property was the source of all vice in society and developed the basic principles for a communist society namely, the abolition of property, the right to live and work for all, and the duty of all citizens to work for the common good. The French philosopher Jean Jacques Rousseau in his hugely influential The Social Contract (1762) outlined the basis for a political order based on popular sovereignty rather than the rule of monarchs, and in his Discourse on Inequality (1755) inveighed against the corrupting effects of private property claiming that the invention of private property had led to the, "crimes, wars, murders, and suffering" that plagued civilization.

I believe that no one will contest the justness of this proposition: that where no property exists, none of its pernicious consequences could exist...if you were to take away property, the blind and pitiless self-interest that accompanies it, you would cause all the prejudices in errors that they sustain to collapse.

— Étienne-Gabriel Morelly, 1755

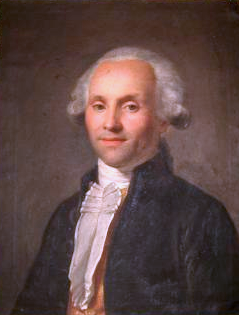
Victor d'Hupay referred to himself as an auteur communiste or "communist author" in 1782

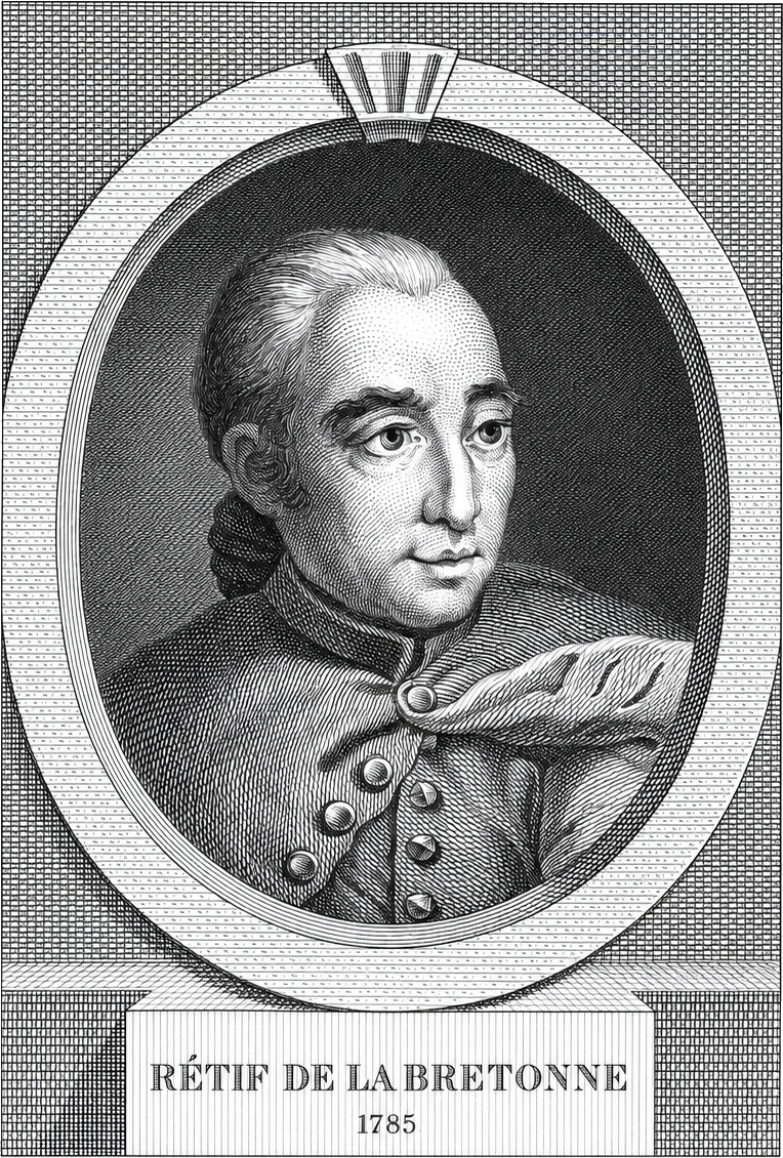
Restif de la Bretonne used the term "communism" in 1793 to describe a society where all private property was eliminated

In 1785 the popular French novelist Restif de la Bretonne wrote a book review on Victor d'Hupay's 1779 book Project for a Philosophical Community which described a plan for a communal experiment in Marseille where all private property was banned and which could be considered, "the first full blueprint for a secular communist society in the world." In the review Restif noted that d'Hupay had referred to himself as a communiste, the French form of the word "communist", in a 1782 letter, the first recorded instance of that term. Restif himself wrote many novels centered around the idea of eliminating private property, first using the term "community of goods" in 1783 and then the term "communism" in 1793, rendered in French as communisme.

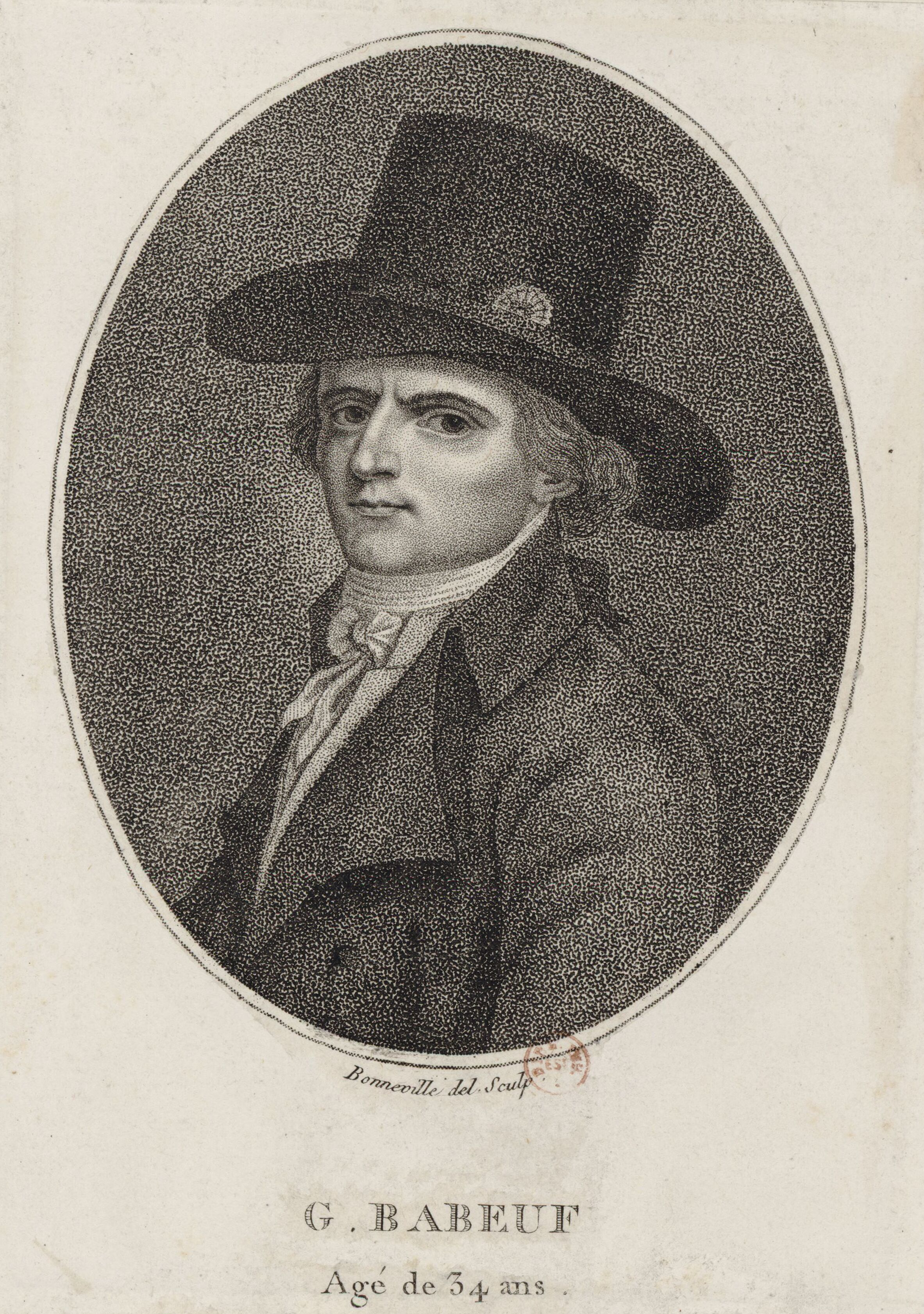
François-Noël Babeuf was a notable advocate for the abolition of private property during the French Revolution

These currents of thought in French philosophy proved influential during the French Revolution of 1789 in which various anti-monarchists, particularly the Jacobins, supported the idea of redistributing wealth equally among the people, including Jean-Paul Marat and Gracchus Babeuf. The latter was involved in the Conspiracy of the Equals of 1796 intending to establish a revolutionary regime based on communal ownership, egalitarianism and the redistribution of property. Babeuf was directly influenced by Morelly's anti-property utopian novel The Code of Nature and quoted it extensively, although he was under the erroneous impression it was written by Diderot.Also during the revolution the publisher Nicholas Bonneville, the founder of the Parisian revolutionary Social Club used his printing press to spread the communist treatises of Restif and Sylvain Maréchal. Maréchal, who later joined Babeuf's conspiracy, would state in his Manifesto of the Equals (1796), "we aim at something more sublime and more just, the COMMON GOOD or the COMMUNITY OF GOODS" and "The French Revolution is just a precursor of another revolution, far greater, far more solemn, which will be the last." Restif also continued to write and publish books on the topic of communism throughout the Revolution. Accordingly, through their egalitarian programs and agitation Restif, Maréchal, and Babeuf became the progenitors of modern communism. Babeuf's plot was detected, however, and he and several others involved were arrested and executed. Because of his views and methods, Babeuf is sometimes referred to as the first revolutionary communist, although at the time Babeuf himself used the term "communitist". Despite this setback, the example of the French Revolutionary regime and Babeuf's doomed insurrection was an inspiration for French socialist thinkers such as Henri de Saint-Simon, Louis Blanc, Charles Fourier and Pierre-Joseph Proudhon. Proudhon, the founder of modern anarchism and libertarian socialism would later famously declare "property is theft!" a phrase first invented by the French revolutionary Brissot de Warville.

=== Post-French Revolution communism ===
Importantly because one of Babeuf's co-conspirators, Philippe Buonarroti, survived the crackdown on the Conspiracy of the Equals he was able, later in his life, to write the influential book Babeuf's Conspiracy for Equality first published in 1828 which chronicled and popularized Babeouf's beliefs. In it Buonarroti asserted that in society, "burdens, productions, and advantages ought to be equally divided," and believed that this division would lead to, "the greatest possible happiness of all." Bournatti's writings led to a revival of Babeuf's thought in France and the dissemination of political theories referred to as Neo-Babouvism. According to Bournatti's Neo-Babouvism a revolutionary elite of "wise and courageous" citizens who cared only for "ensuring the triumph of equality" would be needed to uplift the masses and establish a new society based on egalitarian principles.

By the 1830s and 1840s, the egalitarian concepts of communism and the related ideas of socialism had become widely popular in French revolutionary circles thanks to the writings of social critics and philosophers such as Pierre Leroux and Théodore Dézamy, whose critiques of bourgeoisie liberalism and individualism led to a widespread intellectual rejection of laissez-faire capitalism on economic, philosophical and moral grounds. According to Leroux writing in 1832, "To recognise no other aim than individualism is to deliver the lower classes to brutal exploitation. The proletariat is no more than a revival of antique slavery." He also asserted that private ownership of the means of production allowed for the exploitation of the lower classes and that private property was a concept divorced from human dignity. Dézamy would assert in his 1842 book Code la Communaté that what was needed was a," complete and unrestricted society of communal property" in which all activity was centralized. The systematic, historical and materialist analysis of the nature of communism in Dézamy's work led Marx to consider him among the first scientific socialists along with Jules Gay. It was only in the year 1840 that proponents of common ownership in France, including the socialists Théodore Dézamy, Étienne Cabet, and Jean-Jacques Pillot began to widely adopt the word "communism" as a term for their belief system.

A landmark event that established the popularity of the communist movement in France occurred in 1840 when Dézamy along with Pillot and Albert Laponneraye organized a pro-communist banquet in Belleville, France, the "first public manifestation of the communist party" in France which proved so successful that further planned communist banquets had to be outlawed by the French government. Also in 1840 a society of "Egalitarian Workers" following a communist program was founded in Paris and a general strike was called whose leaders were reportedly inspired by communist ideals. During the 1840s Étienne Cabet had a following of between 100000 and 200000 French workers and was considered by Friedrich Engels to be the representative of the French proletariat. One of the most prominent and influential French communists of the 1840s was Auguste Blanqui who was notable for his belief that violent revolutionary action should be used to overthrow the bourgeosie dominated state. In Blanqui's estimation a revolution would be most successful if it was executed by a small, secretive group which could then install a "dictatorship of the proletariat." Dézamy disagreed with any program endorsing a dictatorship, believing instead that the chief focus should be on cultivating proletarian unity through propaganda and education.

The works and teachings of these French writers, many now self identifying as communists, went on to inspire new communist groups such as the League of the Just, an organization founded in Paris in 1836 by the Christian communist German émigrés Wilhelm Weitling and Karl Schapper. A second group, the Communist Correspondence Committee, was formed in Brussels in 1846 by another pair of German émigrés Karl Marx and Friedrich Engels. The two groups were merged in 1847 to form the Communist League which was headed by Schapper who then proceeded to task the co-founding members Marx and Engels with writing a manifesto laying out the principles of the new political party.

== Marxism ==
=== Karl Marx ===
Communism is the riddle of history solved, and it knows itself to be this solution.

— Karl Marx, 1844

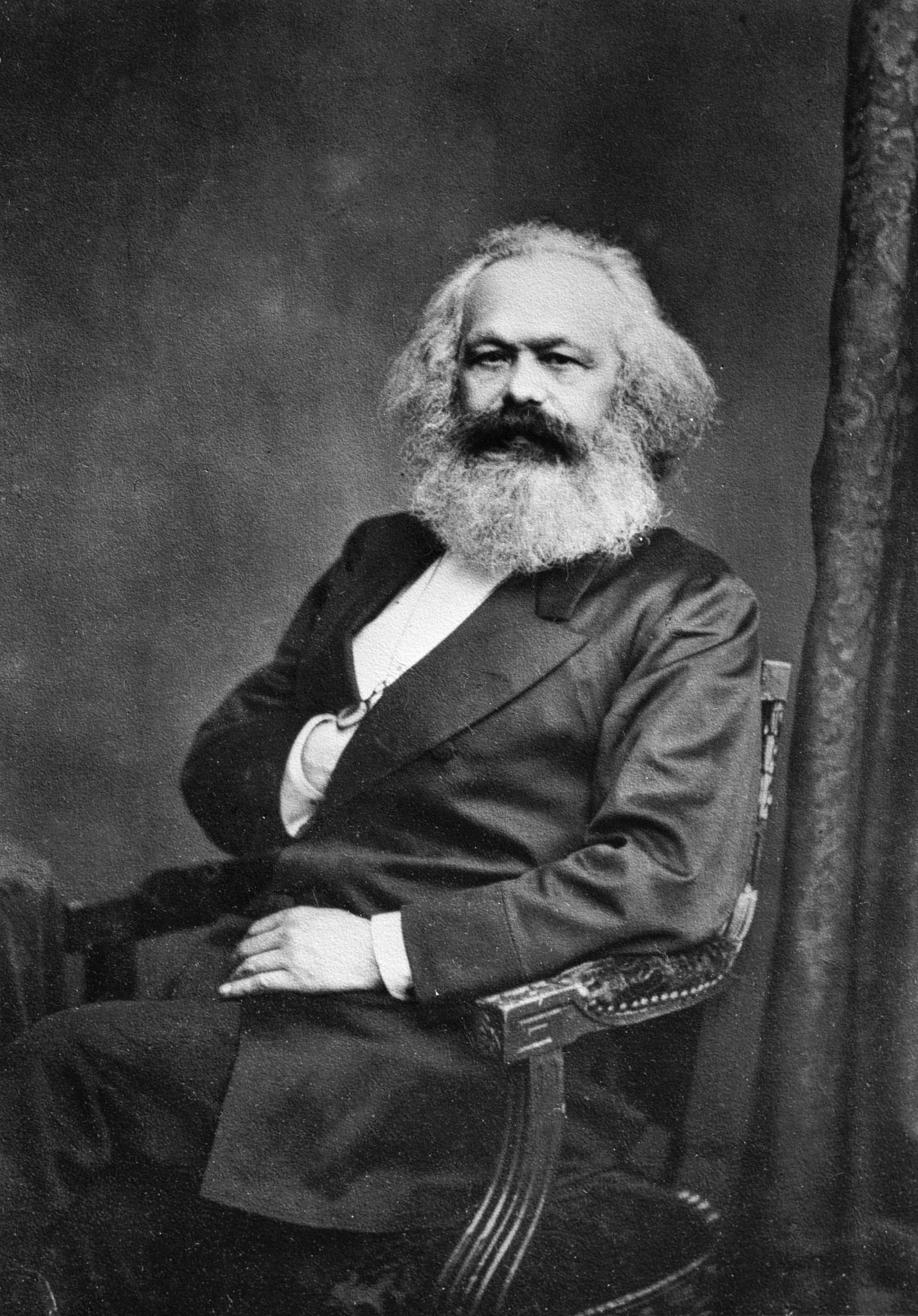
Karl Marx, whose variety of communist theory is known as Marxism

In the 1840s, German philosopher and sociologist Karl Marx, who was living in England after fleeing the authorities in Prussia, where he was considered a political threat, began publishing books in which he outlined his theories for a variety of communism now known as Marxism. Marx was financially aided and supported by another German émigré, Friedrich Engels, who like Marx had fled from the German authorities in 1849. Marx and Engels took on many influences from earlier socialists such as the Utopian socialist Saint-Simonist school. Politically, they were influenced by Maximilien Robespierre and several other radical figures of the French Revolution whilst economically they were influenced by David Ricardo. Philosophically, they were influenced by Georg Wilhelm Friedrich Hegel. Marx stated that "the history of all hitherto existing society is the history of class struggles", something that he believed was happening between the bourgeoisie (the select few upper class and upper middle class) who then controlled society and the proletariat (the working class masses) who toiled to produce everything, but who had no political control. He advanced the idea that human society moved through a series of progressive stages from primitive communism through to slavery, feudalism and then capitalism; and that this, in turn, would be replaced by communism. For Marx, communism was seen as inevitable yet uncertain and desirable.

Marx founded the Communist Correspondence Committee in 1846 through which the various communists, socialists and other leftists across Europe could keep in contact with one another in the face of political repression. He then published The Communist Manifesto in 1848, which would prove to be one of the most influential communist texts ever written. He subsequently began work on a multi-volume epic that would examine and criticise the capitalist economy and the effect that it had upon politics, society and philosophy – the first volume of the work which was known as Capital: Critique of Political Economy was published in 1869. However, Marx and Engels were not only interested in writing about communism, as they were also active in supporting revolutionary activity that would lead to the creation of communist governments across Europe. They helped to found the International Workingmen's Association which would later become known as the First International to unite various communists and socialists, with Marx being elected to the Association's General Council.

Marx summarized his system with the slogan, "From each according to his ability, to each according to his needs." This phrasing used to formulate the principles of communism is borrowed from earlier socialist political activists such as August Becker and Louis Blanc.

=== Early development of Marxism ===
During the latter half of the 19th century, various left-wing organisations across Europe continued to campaign against the many autocratic right-wing regimes that were then in power. In France, socialists set up a government known as the Paris Commune after the fall of Napoleon III in 1871, but they were soon overthrown and many of their members executed by counter-revolutionaries. Meanwhile, Karl Marx and Friedrich Engels joined the German Social-Democratic Party which had been created in 1875, but which was outlawed in 1879 by the German government, then led by Chancellor Otto von Bismarck, who deemed it to be a political threat due to its revolutionary nature and increasing number of supporters. In 1890, the party was re-legalised and by this time it had fully adopted Marxist principles. It subsequently achieved a fifth of the vote in the German elections and some of its leaders, such as August Bebel and Wilhelm Liebknecht, became well-known public figures.

The communists disdain to conceal their views and aims. They openly declare that their ends can be attained only by the forcible overthrow of all existing social conditions. Let the ruling classes tremble at a communist revolution. The proletarians have nothing to lose but their chains. They have a world to win.

— Karl Marx, 1848

At the time, Marxism took off not only in Germany, but it also gained popularity in Hungary, the Habsburg monarchy and the Netherlands, although it did not achieve such success in other European nations like the United Kingdom, where Marx and Engels had been based. Nonetheless, the new political ideology had gained sufficient support that an organisation was founded known as the Second International to unite the various Marxist groups around the world.

As Marxism took off, it also began to come under criticism from other European intellectuals, including fellow socialists and leftists. For instance, the Russian collectivist anarchist Mikhail Bakunin criticised what he believed were the flaws in the Marxian theory that the state would eventually dissolve under a Marxist government, instead he believed that the state would gain in power and become authoritarian. Criticism also came from other sociologists such as the German Max Weber, who whilst admiring Marx disagreed with many of his assumptions on the nature of society. Some Marxists tried to adapt to these criticisms and the changing nature of capitalism and Eduard Bernstein emphasised the idea of Marxists bringing legal challenges against the current administrations over the treatment of the working classes rather than simply emphasising violent revolution as more orthodox Marxists did. Other Marxists opposed Bernstein and other revisionists, with many including Karl Kautsky, Otto Bauer, Rudolf Hilferding, Rosa Luxemburg, Vladimir Lenin and Georgi Plekhanov sticking steadfast to the concept of violently overthrowing what they saw as the bourgeoisie-controlled government and instead establishing a dictatorship of the proletariat.

For Kautsky, the socialist party's mission was to bring socialist consciousness—the "good news" of the proletariat's world-historical mission to create socialism—to the hitherto separate and spontaneously resistant working-class movement. His concept of socialist consciousness being "carried into the class struggle of the proletariat from outside" was famously adopted by Lenin. Lenin popularised politicalvanguardism as conceptualised by Kautsky, detailing his thoughts in one of his earlier works, What Is to Be Done?. Lenin - and subsequent Leninists - argued that Marxism's complexity and the hostility of the establishment required that a close-knit group of individuals pulled from the working class become a vanguard of the greater whole to lead and safeguard the revolutionary ideology within the particular circumstances presented by the reactionary régime. While Lenin wished for a revolutionary organization akin to the contemporary Social Democratic Party of Germany, which was open to the people and more democratic in organization, the Russian autocracy prevented this. Other key Leninist ideas that would shape post-1917 Communism were democratic centralism and the dictatorship of the proletariat.

== Anarchist communism ==
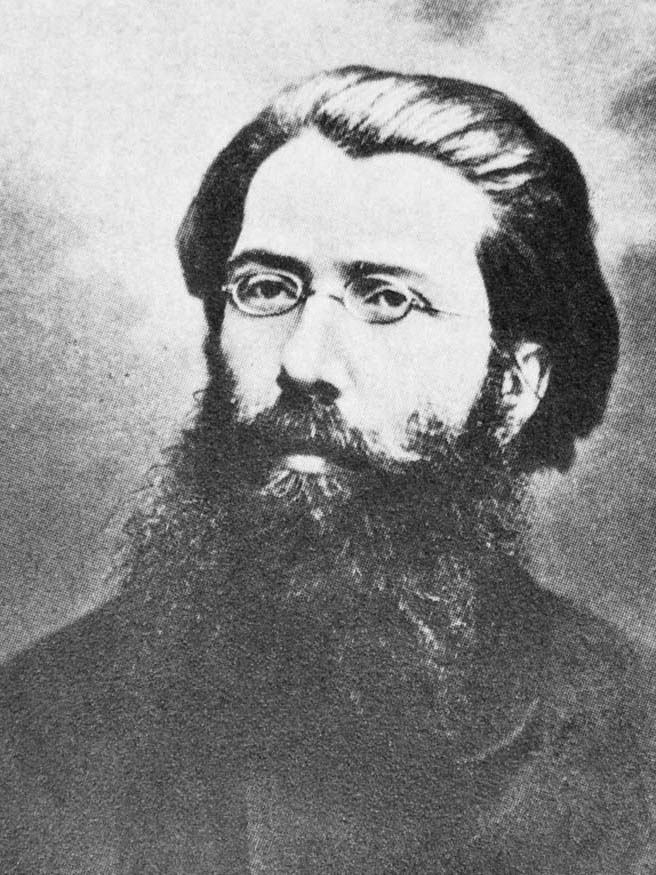
Carlo Cafiero led the break from collectivist anarchism with the first programme for anarchist communism.

With Mikhail Bakunin's death in 1876, the anarchist movement began to shift away from his theory of collectivist anarchism and towards an anarchist communism. The term "anarchist communism" was first printed in François Dumartheray's February 1876 pamphlet, To manual workers, supporters of political action. Élisée Reclus was quick to express his support for anarchist communism, at a meeting of the Anti-Authoritarian International in Lausanne the following month. James Guillaume's August 1876 pamphlet, Ideas on Social Organisation, outlined a proposal by which the collective ownership of the means of production could be used in order to transition towards a communist society. Guillaume considered a necessary prerequisite for communism would be a general condition of abundance, which could set the foundation for the abandonment of exchange value and the free distribution of resources. This program for anarcho-communism was adopted by the Italian anarchists, who had already begun to question collectivism.

Although Guillaume had himself remained neutral throughout the debate, in September 1877, the Italian anarcho-communists clashed with the Spanish collectivists in Verviers at what would be the Anti-Authoritarian International's final congress. Alongside the economic question, the two factions were also divided by the question of organisation. While the collectivists upheld trade unions as a means for achieving anarchy, the communists considered them to be inherently reformist and counter-revolutionary organisations, prone to bureaucracy and corruption. Instead, the communists preferred small, loosely-organised affinity groups, which they believed closer conformed to anti-authoritarian principles.

According to the anarchist historian Max Nettlau, the first use of the term "libertarian communism" came with the 1880 Le Havre anarchist congress used the phrase to identify its doctrines more clearly.

== Revolutions and world communism (1917-1923) ==
=== Russian Revolution, Russian Civil War, and formation of the Soviet Union ===
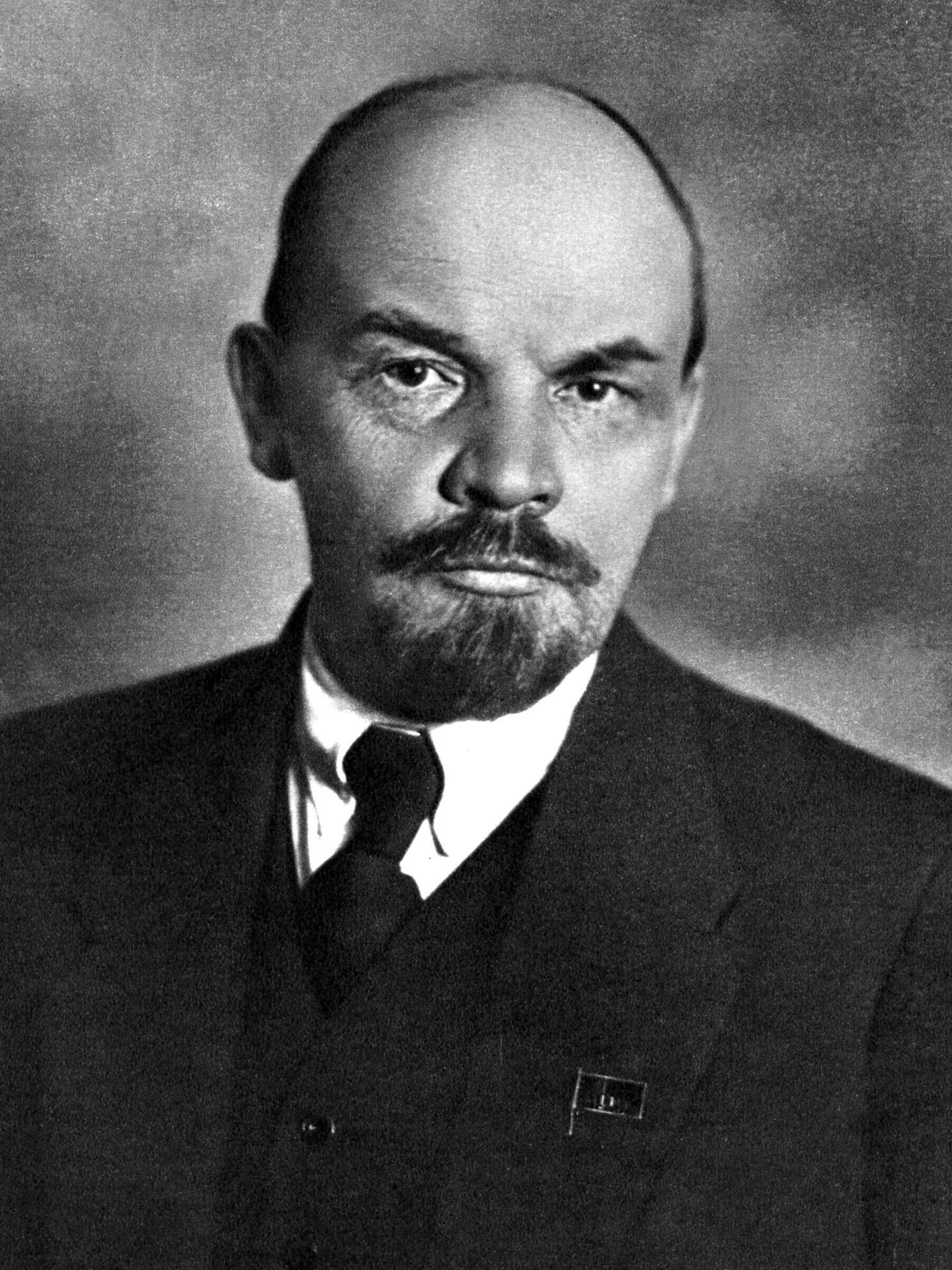
Vladimir Lenin, founder of the Soviet Union and leader of the Bolshevik party.

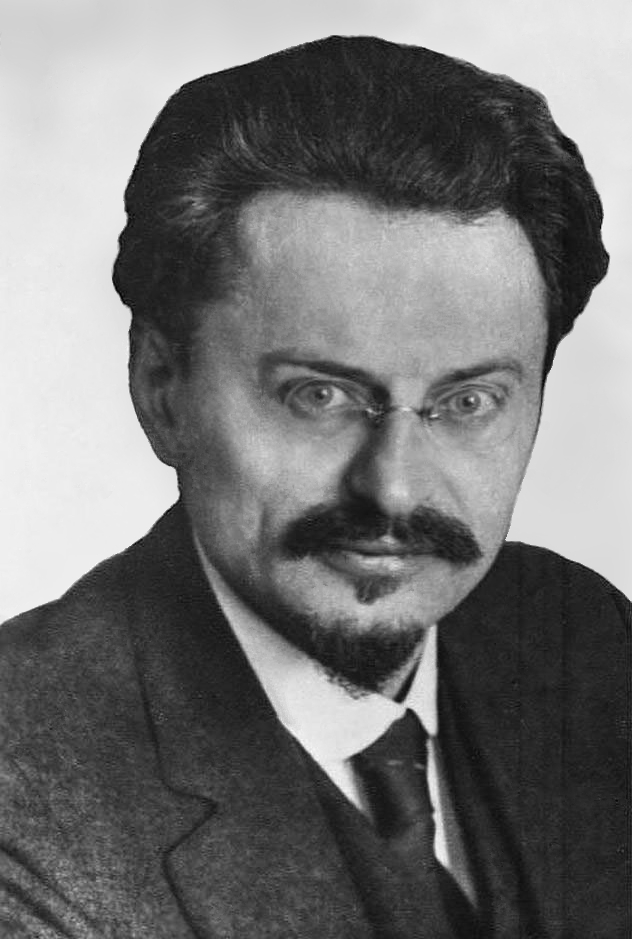
Leon Trotsky, founder of the Red Army and key figure in the October Revolution.

At the start of the 20th century, the Russian Empire was an autocracy controlled by Tsar Nicholas II, with millions of the country's largely agrarian population living in abject poverty. Robert Service noted that "poverty and oppression constituted the best soil for Marxism to grow in". The man most responsible for introducing the ideology into the country was Georgi Plekhanov, although the movement itself was largely organised by Vladimir Lenin, who had for a time been exiled to a prison camp in Siberia by the Tsarist government for his beliefs. A Marxist group known as the Russian Social Democratic Labour Party was formed in the country, although it soon divided into two main factions, namely the Bolsheviks led by Lenin and the Mensheviks led by Julius Martov.

In 1905, there was a revolution against the Tsar's rule in which workers' councils known as soviets were formed in many parts of the country and the Tsar was forced to implement democratic reform, introducing an elected government, the Duma.

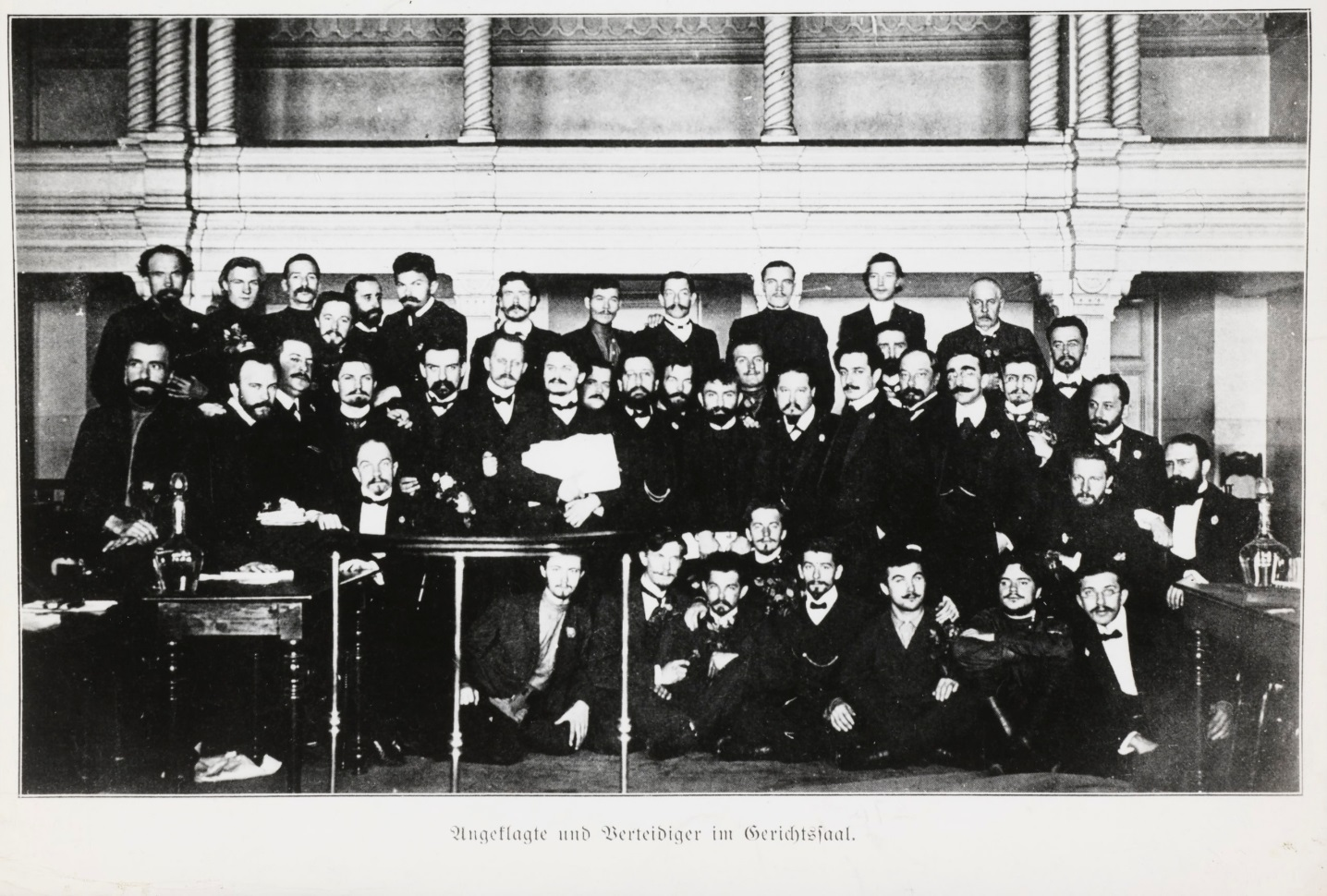
The Soviet of Workers' Deputies of St. Petersburg in 1905, Trotsky in the center. The soviets were an early example of a workers council.

Russian Left Bolshevism emerged in 1907 as the Vpered group challenged Vladimir Lenin's perceived authoritarianism and parliamentarianism. The group included Alexander Bogdanov, Maxim Gorky, Anatoly Lunacharsky, Mikhail Pokrovsky, Grigory Aleksinsky, Stanislav Volski and Martyn Liadov. The Otzovists, or Recallists, advocated the recall of RSDLP representatives from the Third Duma. Bogdanov and his allies accused Lenin and his partisans of promoting liberal democracy through "parliamentarism at any price".

In 1917, the Russian Empire was still embroiled in World War I. The February Revolution overthrew the Russian Empire, and the Russian Provisional Government, which was dominated by liberals, particularly the Constitutional Democratic Party, and included some moderate socialists, came to power. Meanwhile, socialist intellectuals, soldiers, and workers in Petrograd organized the Petrograd Soviet, creating a situation of "dual power." In April, Lenin returned to Russia following the February Revolution and drafted the April Theses, in which he called for land to be owned by the peasants, for workers to exercise control over industrial production, for all nations to enjoy the right to self-determination, and for Russia to withdraw from World War I. Meanwhile, the Provisional Government was suffering through the April Crisis, when Pavel Milyukov of the Constitutional Democratic Party sent a note to the Allies stating that Russia would continue to fight. In July, the Constitutional Democratic Party gave way to a cabinet led by Alexander Kerensky of the Socialist-Revolutionary Party, while large-scale street demonstrations erupted in Petrograd. Some garrison troops strongly opposed new military offensives, and workers, increasingly dissatisfied with the war and the economy, poured into the streets chanting "All power to the Soviets," demanding the establishment of a fully socialist government based on the Soviets to replace the "dual power". In September, Russian military officer Lavr Kornilov attempted to overthrow the Kerensky government. Throughout this series of events, the Bolsheviks gained greater popularity and became more effectively organized.

The elections to the Constituent Assembly took place in November 1917. The Bolsheviks won 24% of the vote.

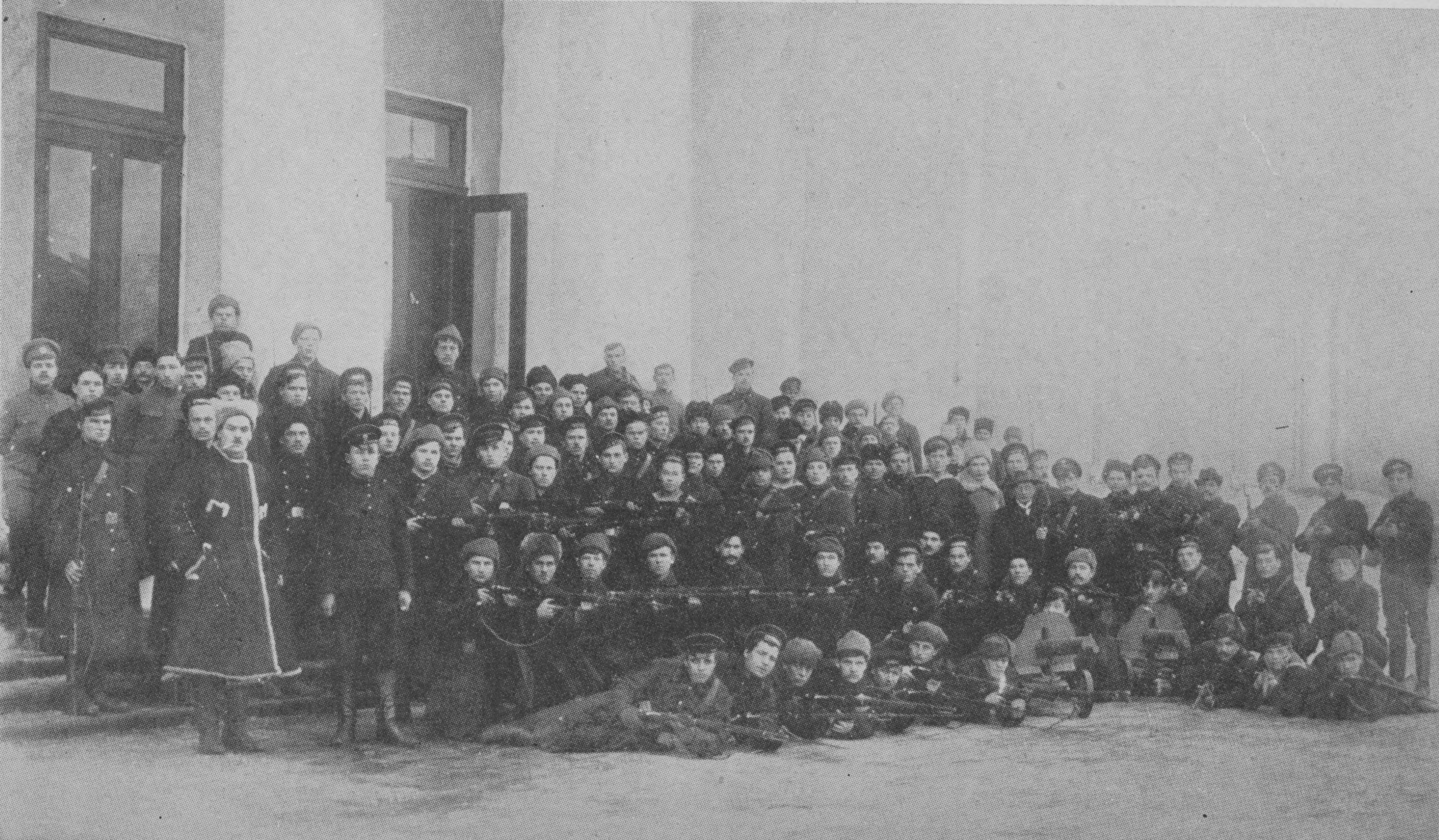
A detachment of Red Guard sailors who dissolved the Constituent Assembly

In October, Lenin began urging the Bolsheviks to seize power in Petrograd. On October 12 (O.S.), Trotsky took control of the Petrograd Military Revolutionary Committee, and on October 25 (November 7 in the modern calendar), the Bolsheviks seized power in Petrograd during the October Revolution. Bolshevik troops occupied public buildings and arrested the ministers of the Provisional Government, announcing an overthrow of the Provincial Government. The Bolsheviks moved to hand power to the Second All-Russian Congress of Soviets of Workers' and Soldiers' Deputies; after a few weeks of deliberation, the Left Socialist-Revolutionaries formed a coalition government with the Bolsheviks from November 1917 to July 1918, while the right-wing faction of the Socialist Revolutionary Party boycotted the soviets and denounced the October Revolution as an illegal coup. In the 1917 Russian Constituent Assembly election, socialist parties totaled well over 70% of the vote. The Bolsheviks were winners in the urban centres, and took around two-thirds of the votes of soldiers on the Western Front, obtaining 23.3% of the vote; the Socialist Revolutionaries finished first on the strength of support from the country's rural peasantry, obtaining 37.6%, while the Ukrainian Socialist Bloc finished a third at 12.7%, and the Mensheviks obtained 3.0% of the vote. Most of the Socialist Revolutionary Party's seats went to the right-wing faction. Citing outdated voter-rolls, which did not acknowledge the party split, and the assembly's conflicts with the Congress of Soviets, during which the Mensheviks and the right-wing Social Revolutionaries had walked out, the Bolshevik–Left Socialist-Revolutionaries government moved to dissolve the Constituent Assembly in January 1918. The Draft Decree on the Dissolution of the Constituent Assembly was issued by the All-Russian Central Executive Committee, a committee dominated by Lenin, who had previously supported a multi-party system of free elections.

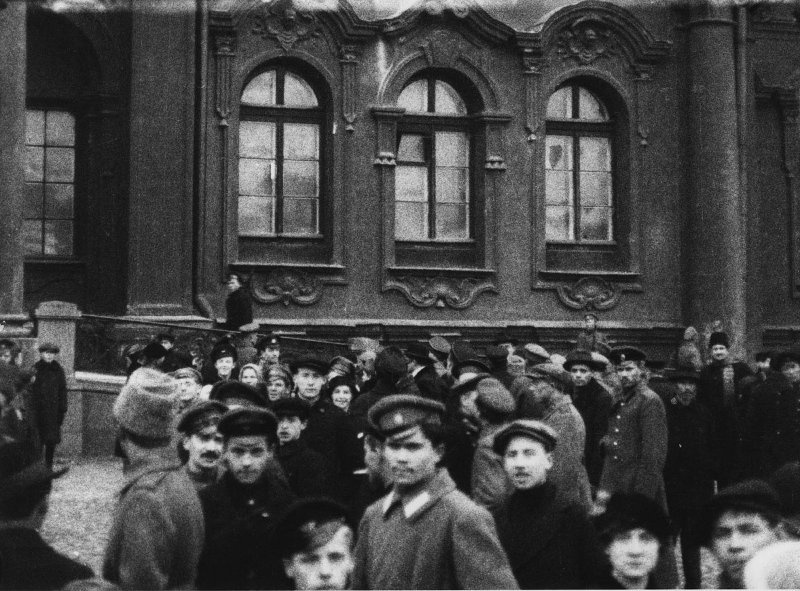
The Winter Palace of Petrograd, one day after the insurrection, 8 November

After the October Revolution, in the countryside, the Bolsheviks implemented prodrazverstka (grain requisitioning), in order to control the surplus grain deemed to exceed the peasants' basic consumption needs; in the cities, they began to control industrial supplies and carry out nationalization. In addition, the Bolsheviks carried out the unconditional confiscation of private property. The Bolsheviks began remodelling the country by nationalizing various industries and confiscating land from wealthy aristocrats and redistributing it amongst the peasants. A series of decrees were signed: the "Decree on Land" expropriated the estates of royal families, churches, and nobilities without compensation and transferred them to the peasants for their use, and the "Decree on Peace" called for an immediate end to the war and urged all belligerent nations to cease hostilities. The Bolsheviks believed this would spark revolutions in Germany and Austria-Hungary. The "Decree on Workers' Control" granted the workforce the right to exercise oversight over enterprise managers. The "Declaration of the Rights of the Peoples of Russia" abolished all privileges based on ethnicity. The "Decree on the Press" granted the Bolsheviks the authority to shut down any newspaper hostile to the new revolutionary government. Under the leadership of Felix Dzerzhinsky, the All-Russian Extraordinary Commission (Cheka) was established as a secret police force. Lenin officially changed the party's name to the Communist Party in March 1918.

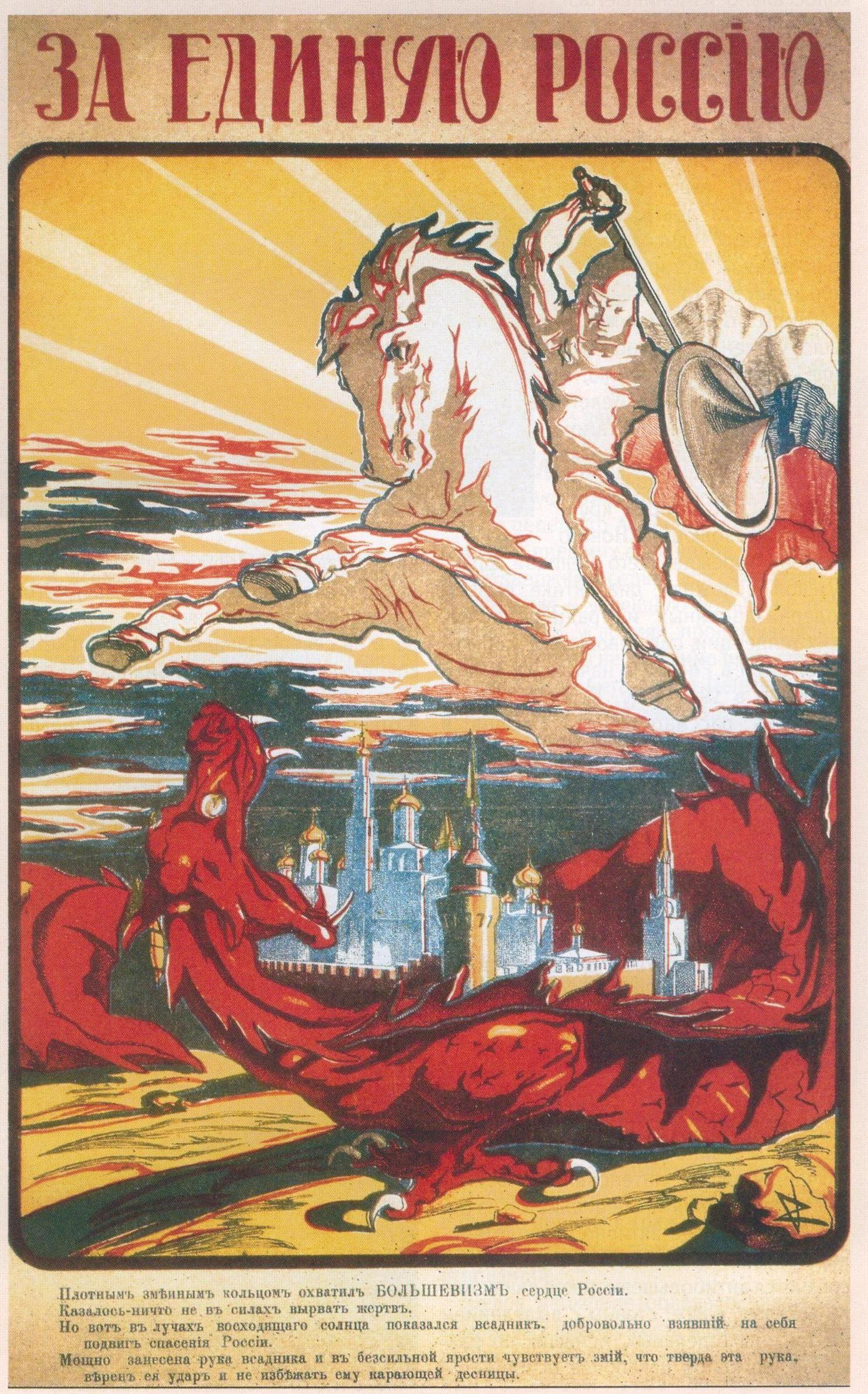
White propaganda poster "For United Russia" representing Soviet Russia as a fallen communist dragon and the White Cause as a crusading knight

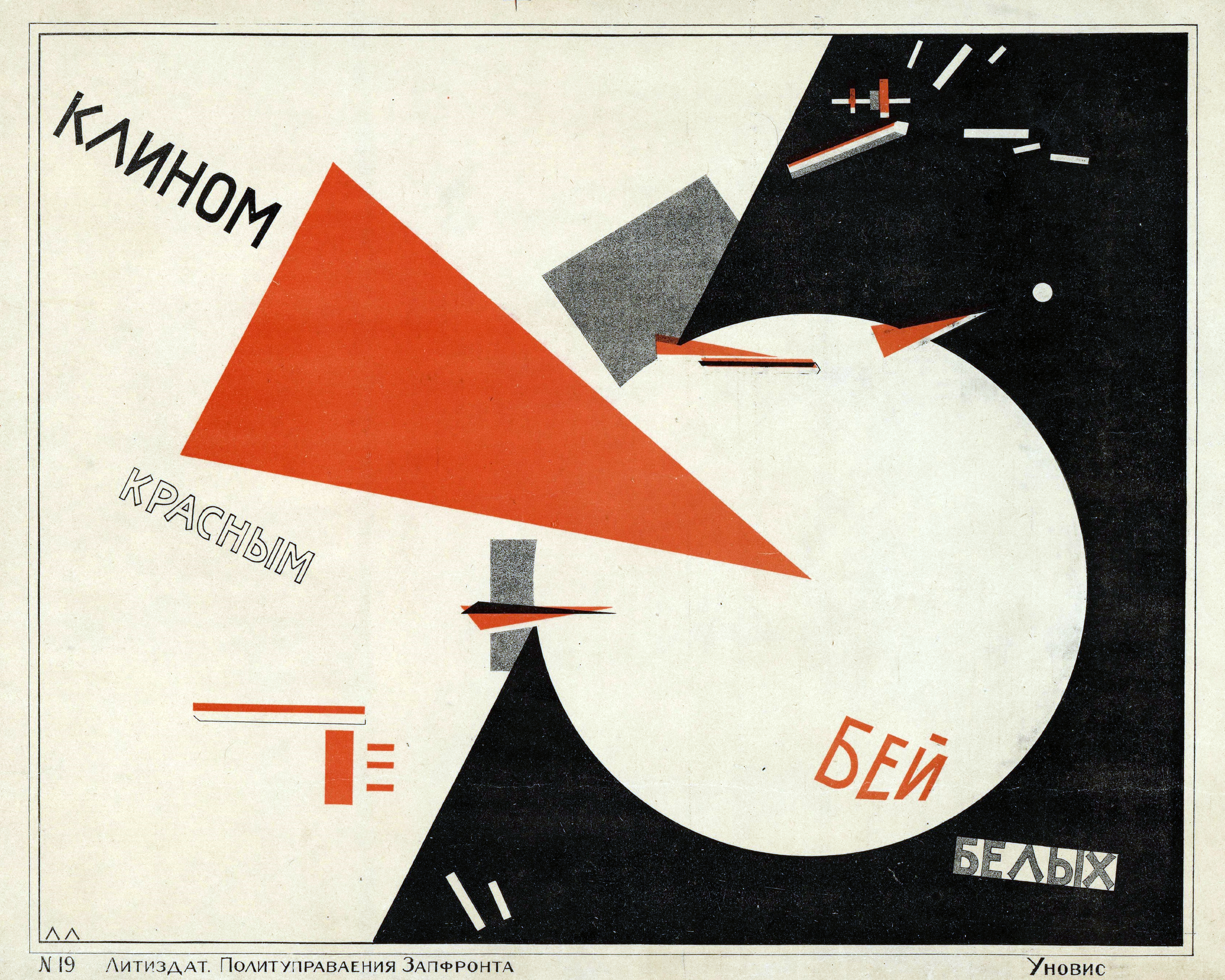
Beat the Whites with the Red Wedge, a Bolshevik Constructivist propaganda poster by El Lissitzky that abstractly represents the defeat of the Whites by the Red Army

In early 1918, the Bolsheviks accepted the Treaty of Brest-Litovsk, and Soviet Russia lost vast territories in Central and Eastern Europe. With the Constituent Assembly dissolved, anti-Bolshevik forces could now only express their dissatisfaction with Bolshevik policies through extra-parliamentary means. The White Movement formed the White Army in various regions to oppose the Bolsheviks, including the Armed Forces of South Russia led by Anton Denikin, the Russian Army led by Aleksandr Kolchak, and corps organized in the Baltic region, Murmansk, and Arkhangelsk. A group of leaders from the Socialist Revolutionary Party, who opposed the Bolsheviks, gathered in Samara on the Volga River and formed Committee of Members of the Constituent Assembly in June; they also received support from the Czechoslovak Legion, which had previously served the Russian Empire. Nationalists across Russia were seeking independence; previously, the self-proclaimed Ukrainian People's Republic had gone to war with the Bolsheviks, and both the Allies and the Central Powers supported certain anti-Bolshevik forces. The Russian Civil War broke out, and to counter the various forces opposing the Bolsheviks, the Bolsheviks gradually transformed their early, largely volunteer-based military into a professional Red Army, led by Leon Trotsky.

War communism was the first economic system adopted by the Bolsheviks during the Russian Civil War as a result of the many challenges. Despite communism in the name, it had strict discipline for workers, strike actions forbidden, obligatory labor duty, and military-style control, and has been described as simple authoritarian control by the Bolsheviks to maintain power and control in the Soviet regions, rather than any coherent political ideology.

In Ukraine, the anarcho-communist guerrilla leader Nestor Makhno led an independent anarchist army from 1918 to 1921 during the Russian Civil War of 1917–1923. A commander of the Revolutionary Insurgent Army of Ukraine, Makhno led a guerrilla campaign opposing both the Bolshevik "Reds" and monarchist "Whites". The Makhnovist movement made various tactical military pacts while fighting various reactionary forces and organizing an anarchist society committed to resisting state authority, whether capitalist or Bolshevik.

The Bolsheviks defeated the White Army and won the Russian Civil War. The Bolsheviks subsequently consolidated their power over the entire country, centralising power from the Kremlin in the capital city of Moscow. In 1922, the Russian Socialist Federative Soviet Republic was officially redesignated to lead the Union of Soviet Socialist Republics, simply known as the Soviet Union.

In 1924, Lenin resigned as leader of the Soviet Union due to poor health and soon died, with Joseph Stalin subsequently taking over control.

=== Comintern, Mongolian invasion, and communist uprisings in Europe ===
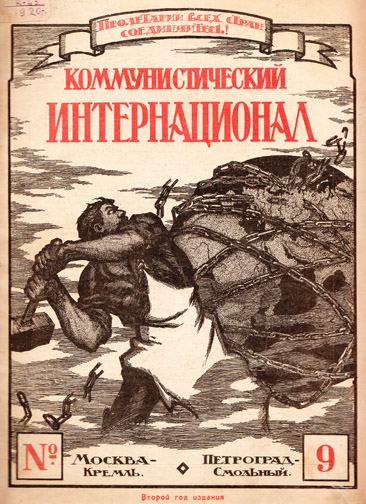
The Communist International published a theoretical magazine of the same name in a variety of European languages from 1919 to 1943

The Bolsheviks initially viewed the revolution in Russia as the beginning of a world revolution, and foreign intervention and their struggle against nationalist forces only reinforced this belief. The Bolsheviks founded the Comintern in 1919, dedicated to promoting revolution throughout the world.

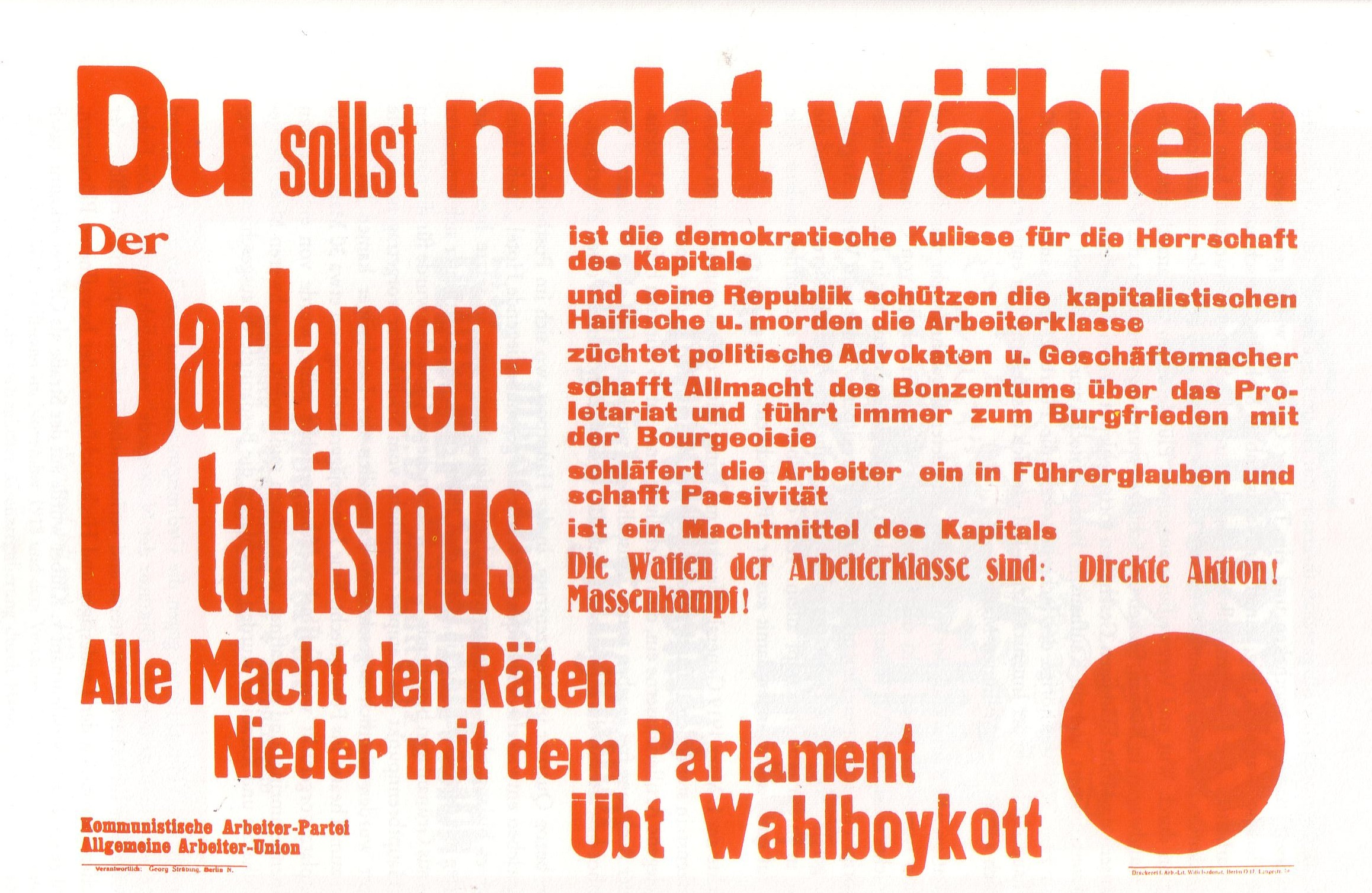
KAPD and AAUD placard calling for an election boycott in 1920

In Germany, the left wing of the Social Democratic Party of Germany founded the Communist Party of Germany (KPD) in December 1918, seeking to replicate the Russian-style communist revolution in Germany. A majority in the party was opposed to electoral politics and trade unionism. These positions placed it to the left of Bolshevik orthodoxy. In January 1919, the KPD launched the Spartacus Uprising, but the uprising was suppressed by the ruling Social Democratic Party and the Freikorps, a right-wing paramilitary organization collaborating with the government. On January 15, 1919, KPD leaders Karl Liebknecht and Rosa Luxemburg were arrested and subsequently extrajudicially executed. In April of that same year, the Bavarian Soviet Republic was briefly established in Bavaria, only to be suppressed by the government once again.

In 1919, the Communist International (Comintern) was formed to promote Bolshevik policies internationally. In October 1919, Paul Levi, the head of the KPD leadership, pushed through a new party line that followed the Comintern's policies. This line called for participation in parliamentary elections and fighting for control of established labor unions. In effect, this forced the left majority out of the party and about half of its 100,000 members left. The KPD joined the Communist International in December 1920.

The Bolsheviks suffered a major defeat at the Battle of Warsaw during the Polish-Soviet War, and Lithuania, Latvia, and Estonia also won their wars of independence against the Bolsheviks, all of which dampened the Bolshevik leadership's optimism about a world revolution.

In April 1920, the communist left in Germany formed the Communist Workers' Party of Germany (KAPD) with an initial membership of about 38,000. The move was partly motivated by the fact that the left perceived the KPD's reaction to the Kapp Putsch as weak. The same year, the General Workers' Union of Germany (AAUD) was formed as a revolutionary labor union partly modeled on the American Industrial Workers of the World (IWW). It was seen by some as the union federation affiliate of the KAPD. At its peak in August 1920, the KAPD had around 40,000 members, with another 200,000 people organized in the AAUD. The March Action of 1921 failed once again, falling short of bringing down the government.

In 1919, political turmoil in Hungary following their defeat in World War I led to a coalition government of the Social Democratic Party and the Communist Party taking control. The Hungarian Communist Party led by Béla Kun soon became dominant and instituted various communist reforms in the country, but the country itself was subsequently invaded by its neighbouring Romania within a matter of months who overthrew the government, with its leaders either escaping abroad or being executed. In 1921, a communist revolt against the Kingdom of Italy occurred whilst supportive factory workers were on strike in Turin and Milan in northern Italy, but the government acted swiftly and put down the rebellion. The Bulgarian Communist Party had also attempted an uprising in 1923, but like most of their counterparts across Europe they were defeated.

In 1921, the Soviet Union invaded its neighboring Mongolia to aid a popular uprising against the Chinese who then controlled the country, instituting a pro-Soviet government which declared the nation to be the Mongolian People's Republic in 1924.

=== Front organisations ===
Communist parties were tight knit organizations that exerted tight control over the members. To reach sympathisers unwilling to join the party, front organizations were created that advocated party-approved positions. Under the leadership of Grigory Zinoviev in the Kremlin, the Comintern established fronts in many countries in the 1920s and after. To coordinate their activities, the Comintern set up various international umbrella organizations (linking groups across national borders) such as the Young Communist International (youth), Profintern (trade unions), Krestintern (peasants), International Red Aid (humanitarian aid), and Red Sport International (organized sports), among others. In Europe, front organizations were especially influential in Italy and France which became the base for Communist front organizer Willi Münzenberg in 1933. These organizations were dissolved by the late 1930s or early 1940s.

The Pan-Pacific Trade Union Secretariat (PPTUS) was set up in 1927 by the Profintern (the Comintern's trade union arm) with the mission of promoting communist trade unions in China, Japan, Korea, the Philippines, Australia, New Zealand and other nations in the western Pacific. Trapeznik (2009) says the PPTUS was a "Communist-front organization" and "engaged in overt and covert political agitation in addition to a number of clandestine activities".

There were numerous communist front organizations in Asia, many oriented to students and youth. According to one historian, in the labor union movement of the 1920s in Japan, the "Hyogikai never called itself a communist front but in effect, this was what it was". He points out it was repressed by the government "along with other communist front groups". In the 1950s, Scalapino argues: "The primary Communist-front organization was the Japan Peace Committee". It was founded in 1949.

=== Interwar dissident communists ===
The International Right Opposition and Trotskyism are examples of dissidents who still claim communism today, but they are not the only ones.

In Russia, the Military Opposition and the Workers' Opposition inherited some characteristics and members of the Left Bolsheviks, as did Gavril Myasnikov's Workers Group of the Russian Communist Party during the debates on the New Economic Policy and the succession to Lenin. Most Left Bolsheviks were affiliated with the Left Opposition in the 1920s, and were expelled from the party in 1927 and later killed during Joseph Stalin's Great Purge.

Left communism first came into focus as a distinct movement around 1918. Its essential features were a stress on the need to build a communist party or workers' council entirely separate from the reformist and centrist elements who "betrayed the proletariat", opposition to all but the most restricted participation in elections and an emphasis on militancy. There have been two primary currents of left communism since World War I, namely the Italian left and the Dutch–German left. The Italian communist left is primarily made up of the Bordigist current and the Damenite current. The Dutch–German current of left communism was historically represented by the Communist Workers' Party of Germany, General Workers' Union of Germany, and the Communist Workers' International.

Left communism attracted criticism from Vladimir Lenin in "Left-Wing" Communism: An Infantile Disorder.

Council communism or councilism is a current of left-communist thought that emerged in the 1920s from the Dutch-German left. Inspired by the November Revolution, council communism was opposed to state socialism and advocated workers' councils and council democracy. Councilism is also opposed to Leninism and Stalinism. It was strongest in Germany and the Netherlands during the 1920s. Councilism had a limited impact outside of Germany, but a number of international organisations formed.

Delo truda was a libertarian communist magazine published by exiled Russian and Ukrainian anarchists. Initially under the editorship of Peter Arshinov, after it published the Organizational Platform, the subsequent controversy resulted in his exit from the anarchist movement. The magazine was then picked up by Grigorii Maksimov, who moved it to the United States and edited it until his death in 1950.

In Spain, a fusion of left and right dissidents led to the formation of the POUM. Additionally, the Spanish CNT was associated with the development of the FAI political party, a non-Marxist party which stood for libertarian communism.

== Socialism in One Country and World War II (1924-1944) ==
=== Stalinism ===
Joseph Stalin, leader of the Soviet Union from 1924 to 1953

In 1924, Joseph Stalin, a key Bolshevik follower of Lenin, took power in the Soviet Union. Stalin was supported in his leadership by Nikolai Bukharin, but he had various important opponents in the government, most notably Lev Kamenev, Leon Trotsky, and Grigory Zinoviev. Stalin initiated his own process of building a communist society, creating a variant of communism known as Marxism–Leninism. As a part of this, he abandoned some of the capitalist, market policies that had been allowed to continue under Lenin such as the New Economic Policy. Stalinist policies radically altered much of the Soviet Union's agricultural production, modernising it by introducing tractors and other machinery, forced collectivisation of the farms and forced collection of grains from the peasants in accordance with predecided targets. There was food available for industrial workers, but those peasants who refused to move starved, especially in Kazakhstan and Ukraine. The All-Union Communist Party (Bolsheviks) targeted kulaks, who owned a little land.

Stalin took control of the Comintern and introduced a policy in the international organisation of opposing all leftists who were not Marxist–Leninists, labelling them to be social fascists, although many communists such as Jules Humbert-Droz disagreed with him on this policy, believing that the left should unite against the rise of right-wing movements like fascism across Europe. In the early 1930s, Stalin reversed course and promoted popular front movements whereby communist parties would collaborate with socialists and other political forces. A high priority was mobilizing wide support for the Republican cause in the Spanish Civil War.

==== Great Purge ====
The Great Purge mainly operated from December 1936 to November 1938, although the features of arrest and summary trial followed by execution were well entrenched in the Soviet system since the days of Lenin as Stalin systematically destroyed the older generation of pre-1918 leaders. Stalin did so usually under the justification that the accused were enemy spies or deemed "enemies of the people"; in the Red Army, a majority of generals were executed and hundreds of thousands of other "enemies of the people" were sent to the gulag, where inhumane conditions in Siberia led a quick death. (Note: The exact number of purge victims is unknown by a factor of 10. Estimates range from several million upwards to 20 million. Historian Robert Service believes that 1.5 million were arrested and 200000 were eventually released. Service, chapter 31, especially p. 356. The lowest estimates by J. Arch Getty et al. give more than 300000 executions in each of the years 1937 and 1938.)

The opening of the Soviet archives has vindicated the lower estimates put forth by the "revisionist school" scholars, despite the popular press continuing to use higher estimates and containing serious errors. By 2009, historian Archie Brown reported that estimates were now lower; about 1.7 million were arrested in 1937–1938 and half were shot.

=== Spanish revolution and civil war ===
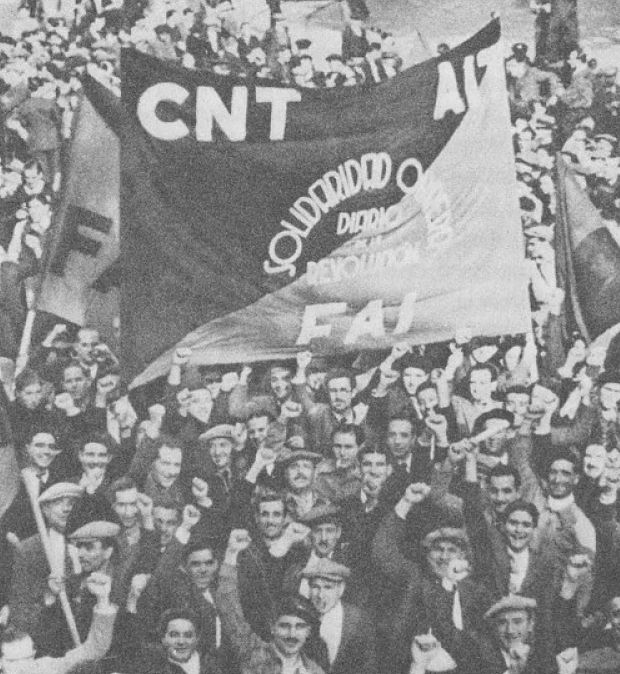
CNT-FAI Anarchists during the Spanish Revolution of 1936

The most extensive application of anarcho-communist ideas happened in the anarchist territories during the Spanish Revolution of 1936.

In Spain, the national anarcho-syndicalist trade union Confederación Nacional del Trabajo (CNT) initially refused to join a popular-front electoral alliance, and abstention by CNT supporters led to a right-wing election victory. In 1936, the CNT changed its policy, and anarchist votes helped bring the popular front back to power. Months later, the former ruling class responded with an attempted coup, which led to the outbreak of the Spanish Civil War of 1936–1939. In response to the army rebellion, an anarchist-inspired movement of peasants and industrial workers, supported by armed militias, took control of Barcelona and of large areas of rural Spain, where they collectivized the land. However, even before the fascist victory in 1939, the anarchists were losing ground in a bitter struggle with the Stalinists, who controlled the distribution of military aid from the Soviet Union to the Republican cause. The events known as the "Spanish Revolution" was a workers' social revolution that began during the outbreak of the Spanish Civil War in 1936 and resulted in the widespread implementation of anarchist and, more broadly, libertarian socialist organizational principles throughout various portions of the country for two to three years, primarily in Catalonia, Aragon, Andalusia, and parts of the Levante. Much of Spain's economy was put under worker control; in anarchist strongholds like Catalonia, the figure was as high as 75%, but lower in areas with heavy Communist Party of Spain influence, as the Soviet-allied party actively resisted attempts at collectivization-enactment. Factories were run through worker committees, and agrarian areas became collectivized and ran as libertarian communes.

Anarchist Gaston Leval estimated that about eight million people participated directly or at least indirectly in the Spanish Revolution, which historian Sam Dolgoff claimed was the closest any revolution had come to realizing a free, stateless mass society. Stalinist-led troops suppressed the collectives and persecuted both dissident Marxists and anarchists.

Only two countries openly and fully supported the Spanish Republic: the Mexican government and the USSR. From them, especially the USSR, the Republic received diplomatic support, volunteers, weapons and vehicles. Other countries remained neutral; this neutrality faced serious opposition from sympathizers in the United States and United Kingdom, and to a lesser extent in other European countries and from Marxists worldwide. This led to formation of the International Brigades, thousands of foreigners of all nationalities who voluntarily went to Spain to aid the Republic in the fight; they meant a great deal to morale but militarily were not very significant.

== Communist camp and early Cold War (1945–1957) ==
As the Cold War took effect around 1947, the Kremlin set up new international coordination bodies including the World Federation of Democratic Youth, the International Union of Students, the World Federation of Trade Unions, the Women's International Democratic Federation and the World Peace Council. Malcolm Kennedy says the "Communist 'front' system included such international organizations as the WFTU, WFDY, IUS, WIDF and WPC, besides a host of lesser bodies bringing journalists, lawyers, scientists, doctors and others into the widespread net".

The World Federation of Trade Unions (WFTU) was established in 1945, to unite trade union confederations across the world and it was based in Prague. While it had non-communist unions it was largely dominated by the Soviets. In 1949 the British, American and other non-Communist unions broke away from the WFTU to form the rival International Confederation of Free Trade Unions (ICFTU). The labor movement in Europe became so polarized between the communist unions and social democratic and Christian labor unions, whereas front operations could no longer hide the sponsorship and they became less important.

=== Soviet Union after World War II ===
The devastation of the war resulted in a massive recovery program involving the rebuilding of industrial plants, housing and transportation as well as the demobilization and migration of millions of soldiers and civilians. In the midst of this turmoil during the winter of 1946–1947, the Soviet Union experienced the worst natural famine in the 20th century. There was no serious opposition to Stalin as the NKVD secret police continued to send possible suspects to the gulag.

Relations with the United States and Britain went from friendly to hostile, as they denounced Stalin's political controls over eastern Europe and his blockade of Berlin. By 1947, the Cold War had begun. Stalin himself believed that capitalism was a hollow shell and would crumble under increased non-military pressure exerted through proxies in countries like Italy. However, he greatly underestimated the economic strength of the West and instead of triumph saw the West build up alliances that were designed to permanently stop or contain Soviet expansion. In early 1950, Stalin gave the go-ahead for North Korea's invasion of South Korea, expecting a short war. He was stunned when the Americans entered and defeated the North Koreans, putting them almost on the Soviet border. Stalin supported China's entry into the Korean War which drove the Americans back to the prewar boundaries, but which escalated tensions. The United States decided to mobilize its economy for a long contest with the Soviets, built the hydrogen bomb and strengthened the NATO alliance that covered Western Europe.

According to Gorlizki and Khlevniuk (2004), Stalin's consistent and overriding goal after 1945 was to consolidate the nation's superpower status and in the face of his growing physical decrepitude to maintain his own hold on total power. Stalin created a leadership system that reflected historic czarist styles of paternalism and repression, yet was also quite modern. At the top, personal loyalty to Stalin counted for everything. However, Stalin also created powerful committees, elevated younger specialists and began major institutional innovations. In the teeth of persecution, Stalin's deputies cultivated informal norms and mutual understandings which provided the foundations for collective rule after his death.

=== Eastern Europe ===
Political alignments in Europe during the Cold War after 1961

The military success of the Red Army in Central and Eastern Europe led to a consolidation of power in communist hands. In some cases, such as Czechoslovakia, this led to enthusiastic support for socialism inspired by the Communist Party and a Social Democratic Party willing to fuse. In other cases, such as Poland or Hungary, the fusion of the Communist Party with the Social Democratic Party was forcible and accomplished through undemocratic means. In many cases, the communist parties of Central Europe were faced with a population initially quite willing to reign in market forces, institute limited nationalisation of industry and supporting the development of intensive social welfare states, whereas broadly the population largely supported socialism. However, the purges of non-communist parties that supported socialism, combined with forced collectivisation of agriculture and a Soviet-bloc wide recession in 1953 led to deep unrest. This unrest first surfaced in Berlin in 1953, where Brecht ironically suggested that "the Party ought to elect a new People". However, Nikita Khrushchev's "Secret Speech" of 1956 opened up internal debate, even if members were unaware, in both the Polish and Hungarian communist parties. This led to the Polish crisis of 1956 which was resolved through change in Polish leadership and a negotiation between the Soviet and Polish parties over the direction of the Polish economy.

==== Hungarian Revolution of 1956 ====
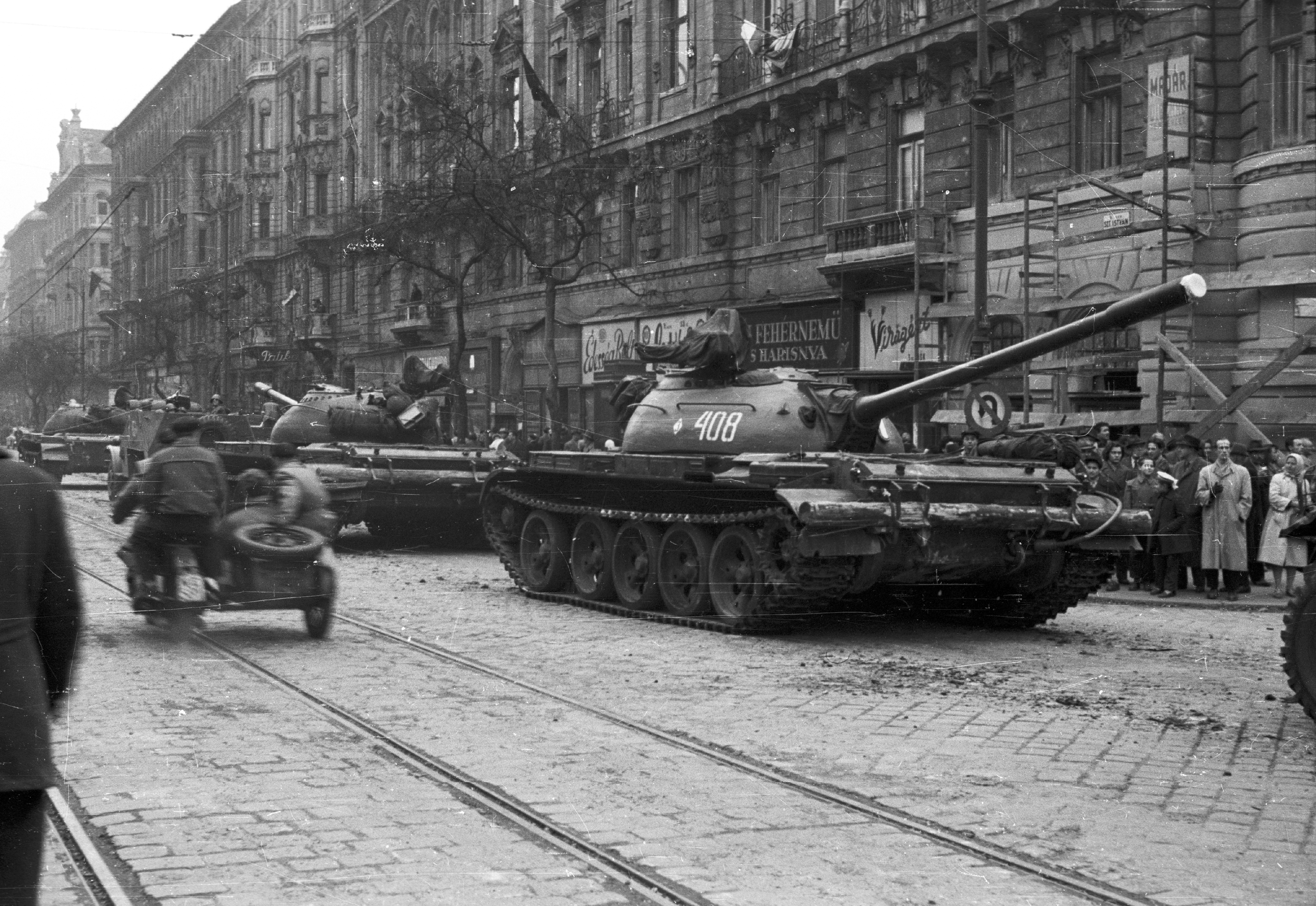
Soviet T-54 tanks in Budapest on 31 October

The Hungarian Revolution of 1956 was a major challenge to Moscow's control of Eastern Europe. This revolution saw general strikes, the formation of independent workers councils, the restoration of the Social Democratic Party as a party for revolutionary communism of a non-Soviet variety and the formation of two underground independent communist parties. The mainstream Communist Party was controlled for a period of about a week by non-Soviet aligned leaders. Two non-communist parties that supported the maintenance of socialism also regained their independence. This flowering of dissenting communism was crushed by a combination of a military invasion supported by heavy artillery and airstrikes; mass arrests, at least a thousand juridical executions and an uncounted number of summary executions; the crushing of the Central Workers Council of Greater Budapest; mass refugee flight; and a worldwide propaganda campaign. The effect of the Hungarian Revolution on other communist parties varied significantly, resulting in large membership losses in Anglophone communist parties.

=== West Germany ===
West Germany and West Berlin were centers of East–West conflict during the Cold War and numerous communist fronts were established. For example, the East Germany organization Society for German–Soviet Friendship (GfDSF) had 13000 members in West Germany, but it was banned in 1953 by some Länder as a communist front. The Democratic Cultural League of Germany started off as a series of genuinely pluralistic bodies, but in 1950–1951 came under the control of the communists. By 1952, the United States Embassy counted 54 "infiltrated organizations" which started independently as well as 155 "front organizations" which had been communist inspired from their start.

=== China ===
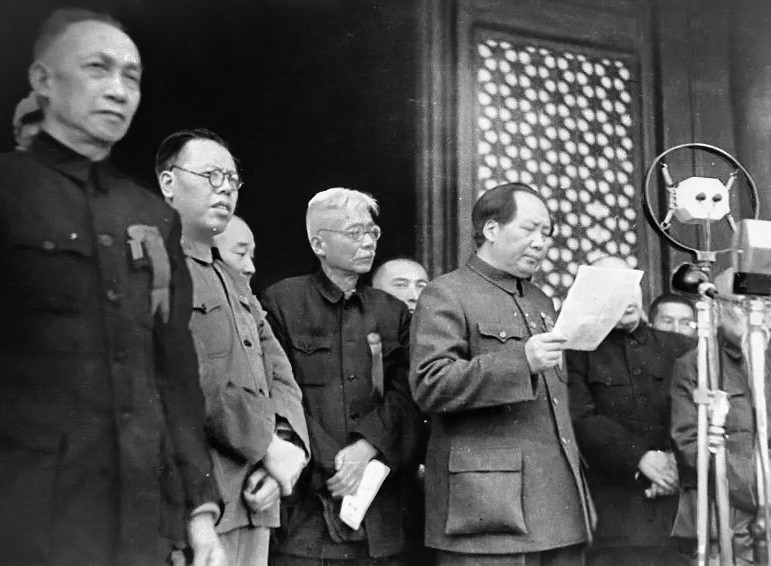
Mao Zedong proclaiming the foundation of the People's Republic of China on October 1, 1949

==== Great Leap Forward ====
Mao Zedong and the Chinese Communist Party came to power in China in 1949 as the Nationalists headed by the Kuomintang fled to the island of Taiwan. In 1950–1953, China engaged in a large-scale, undeclared war with the United States, South Korea and United Nations forces in the Korean War. While its hostility ended in a military stalemate, it gave Mao the opportunity to identify and purge elements in China that seemed supportive of capitalism. At first, there was close cooperation with Stalin, who sent in technical experts to aid the industrialization process along the line of the Soviet model of the 1930s. After Stalin's death in 1953, relations with Moscow soured – Mao thought Stalin's successors had betrayed the Communist ideal. Mao charged that Soviet leader Nikita Khrushchev was the leader of a "revisionist clique" which had turned against Marxism and Leninism was now setting the stage for the restoration of capitalism. The two nations were at sword's point by 1960. Both began forging alliances with communist supporters around the globe, thereby splitting the worldwide movement into two hostile camps.

Rejecting the Soviet model of rapid urbanization, Mao Zedong and his top aide Deng Xiaoping launched the Great Leap Forward in 1957–1961 with the goal of industrializing China overnight, using the peasant villages as the base rather than large cities. Private ownership of land ended and the peasants worked in large collective farms that were now ordered to start up heavy industry operations, such as steel mills. Plants were built in remote locations, despite the lack of technical experts, managers, transportation or needed facilities. Industrialization failed, but the main result was a sharp unexpected decline in agricultural output, which led to mass famine and millions of deaths. The years of the Great Leap Forward in fact saw economic regression, with 1958 through 1961 being the only years between 1953 and 1983 in which China's economy saw negative growth. Political economist Dwight Perkins argues, "Enormous amounts of investment produced only modest increases in production or none at all. [...] In short, the Great Leap was a very expensive disaster". Put in charge of rescuing the economy, Deng adopted pragmatic policies that the idealistic Mao disliked. For a while, Mao was in the shadows, but he returned to center stage and purged Deng and his allies in the Cultural Revolution (1966–1969).

=== Early post-war dissident communists ===
Following the Second World War, Trotskyism was wracked by increasing internal divisions over analysis and strategy. This was combined with an industrial impotence that was widely recognised. Additionally, the success of Soviet-aligned parties in Europe and Asia led to the persecution of Trotskyist intellectuals such as the infamous purge of Vietnamese Trotskyists. The Trotskyist International Secretariat of the Fourth International (ISFI) organised an international conference in 1946 and then World Congresses in 1948 and 1951 to assess the expropriation of the capitalists in Eastern Europe and Yugoslavia, the threat of a Third World War and the tasks of revolutionaries. The Eastern European Communist-led governments, which came into being after World War II without a social revolution, were described by a resolution of the 1948 congress as presiding over capitalist economies. By 1951, the Congress had concluded that they had become "deformed workers' states". As the Cold War intensified, the ISFI's 1951 World Congress adopted theses by Michel Pablo that anticipated an international civil war. Pablo's followers considered that the Communist Parties, under pressure from the real workers' movement, could escape Stalin's manipulations and follow a revolutionary orientation. The 1951 Congress argued that Trotskyists should start to conduct systematic work inside those Communist Parties, followed by the majority of the working class. However, the ISFI's view that the Soviet leadership was counterrevolutionary remained unchanged. The 1951 Congress argued that the USSR took over these countries because of the military and political results of World War II and instituted nationalized property relations only after its attempts at placating capitalism failed to protect those countries from the threat of incursion by the West.

WWII had also strained social democratic parties in the West. In some cases, such as Italy, significant bodies of membership of the Social Democratic Party were inspired by the possibility of achieving advanced socialism. In Italy, this group, combined with dissenting communists, began to discuss theory centred on the experience of work in modern factories, leading to autonomist Marxist. In the United States, this theoretical development was paralleled by the Johnson–Forest Tendency whereas in France a similar impulse occurred.

As a result of Nikita Khrushchev's Secret Speech denouncing Joseph Stalin, many abandoned the Communist Party of Great Britain (CPGB) and began to rethink orthodox Marxism. Some joined various Trotskyist groupings or the Labour Party.

The Marxist historians E. P. Thompson and John Saville of the Communist Party Historians Group published a dissenting journal within the CPGB called Reasoner. Refusing to discontinue the publication at the behest of the CPGB, the two were suspended from party membership and relaunched the journal in the summer of 1957 as The New Reasoner.

== De-Stalinization, Sino-Soviet split and spread of the Cold War (1958–1979) ==
=== New Left ===
The confused response of the Communist Party of the USA and the Communist Party of Great Britain to the Hungarian Revolution of 1956 led some Marxist intellectuals to develop a more democratic approach to politics, opposed to what they saw as the centralised and authoritarian politics of the pre-World War II leftist parties. The Marxists who became disillusioned with the authoritarian nature of Communist Parties eventually formed the "new left".

Initially, the movement was composed of dissenting Communist Party intellectuals and campus groups in the United Kingdom; later it incorporated student radicals in the United States and in the Western Bloc. The term nouvelle gauche was already current in France in the 1950s. It was associated with France Observateur, and its editor Claude Bourdet, who attempted to form a third position, between the dominant Stalinist and social democratic tendencies of the left, and the two Cold War blocs. It was from this French "new left" that the "First New Left" of Britain borrowed the term. In 1960, The New Reasoner merged with the Universities and Left Review to form New Left Review. a publication aimed at making the ideas of culturally oriented theorists available to an undergraduate reading audience. These early New Left journals attempted to forge a Marxist revisionist position of "socialist humanism", departing from orthodox Marxist theory. In a 2010 retrospective, Stuart Hall wrote, "I was troubled by the failure of orthodox Marxism to deal adequately with either 'Third World' issues of race and ethnicity, and questions of racism, or with literature and culture, which preoccupied me intellectually as an undergraduate."

In the United States, "New Left" was the name loosely associated with radical, Marxist political movements that arose during the 1960s, primarily among college students. At the core of these movements was the Students for a Democratic Society (SDS). Noting the perversion of "the older Left" by "Stalinism", in their 1962 Port Huron Statement the SDS eschewed "formulas" and "closed theories". Instead they called for a "new left ... committed to deliberativeness, honesty [and] reflection". The New Left that developed in the following years was "a loosely organized, mostly white student movement that advocated for democracy, civil rights, and various types of university reforms, and protested against the Vietnam war".

The European New Left appeared first in West Germany and West Berlin, which became a prototype for European student radicals. West Berlin, an Allied-occupied island within socialist East Germany to which young men from both German states had moved to avoid conscription, in particular became a center of critical dissent from the rival social-democratic and communist party traditions. At the beginning of 1960, an early grouping was Subversive Action (Subversiven Aktion), conceived as the German branch of the Situationist International. Associated with the charismatic East German emigre, and student of the Frankfurt School, Rudi Dutschke, it became a leading faction within the German Socialist Students' Union (Sozialistischer Deutscher Studentenbund, SDS).

Many in the New Left gravitated to their own takes on established forms of Marxism, such as the New Communist movement (which drew from Maoism) in the United States or the K-Gruppen in Germany, the mainly Maoist-oriented small parties and other associations that had emerged in the 1960s with the disintegration of the German SDS and the associated decline of the West German student movement. (Note: The term "K group" has been used primarily by competing left groups as well as in the media. It served as a collective name for the numerous, often violently divided groups and alluded to their common self-image as communist cadre organizations. The German term Kader denotes the civil servants or party functionaries in autocratic state systems, especially in socialist states (today, among others, the People's Republic of China and Cuba). In the Soviet sphere of influence, cadres were a group of people in the party and ideology sector with political and technical knowledge and skills ("party cadres", "leadership cadres", "leadership cadres", "junior cadres", "cadre policy", "cadre management"). In particular, they included the functionaries of the parties and mass organizations (executives), and university and technical college graduates (experts), but not normal working people. The personnel department of a company was called "Kaderabteilung" in the GDR; the head of this department was called "Kaderleiter".)

=== Maoism and the Cultural Revolution in China ===
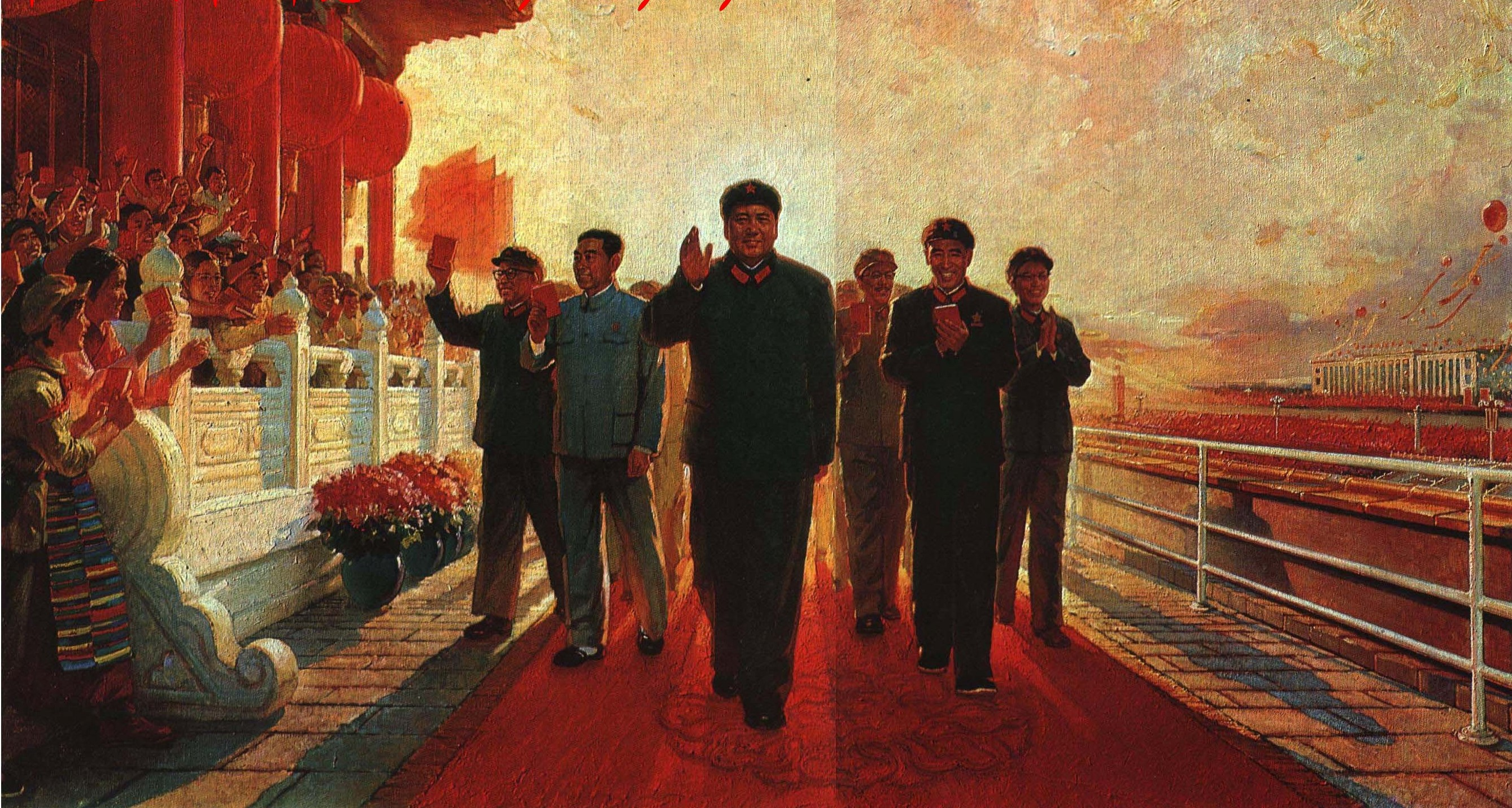
The propaganda oil painting of Mao during the Cultural Revolution (1967).

The Cultural Revolution was an upheaval that targeted intellectuals and party leaders from 1966 through 1976. Mao's goal was to purify communism by removing pro-capitalists and traditionalists by imposing Maoist orthodoxy within the Chinese Communist Party. The movement paralyzed China politically and weakened the country economically, culturally and intellectually for years. Millions of people were accused, humiliated, stripped of power and either imprisoned, killed or most often sent to work as farm laborers. Mao insisted that these he labelled revisionists be removed through violent class struggle. The two most prominent militants were Marshall Lin Biao of the army and Mao's wife Jiang Qing. China's youth responded to Mao's appeal by forming Red Guard groups around the country. The movement spread into the military, urban workers and the Communist Party leadership itself. It resulted in widespread factional struggles in all walks of life. In the top leadership, it led to a mass purge of senior officials who were accused of taking a "capitalist road", most notably Liu Shaoqi and Deng Xiaoping. During the same period, Mao's personality cult grew to immense proportions. After Mao's death in 1976, the survivors were rehabilitated and many returned to power.

Many New Left thinkers in the United States were influenced by the Vietnam War and the Chinese Cultural Revolution. Some in the U.S. New Left argued that since the Soviet Union could no longer be considered the world center for proletarian revolution, new revolutionary Communist thinkers had to be substituted in its place, such as Mao Zedong, Ho Chi Minh and Fidel Castro. Todd Gitlin in The Whole World Is Watching in describing the movement's influences stated, "The New Left, again, refused the self-discipline of explicit programmatic statement until too late—until, that is, the Marxist–Leninist sects filled the vacuum with dogmas, with clarity on the cheap."

=== Cuban Revolution ===
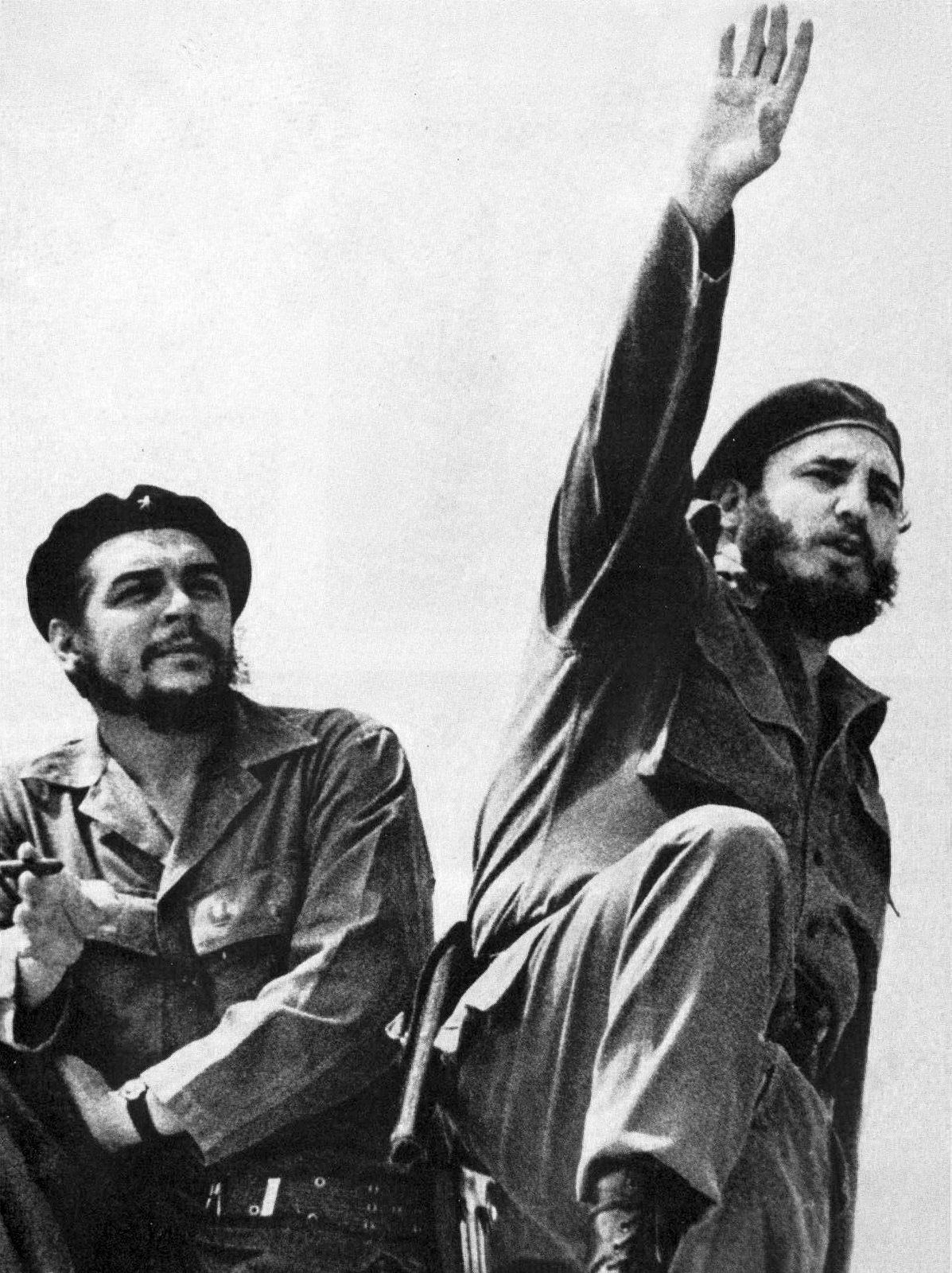
Che Guevara (left) and Fidel Castro (right) in 1961

The Cuban Revolution was a successful armed revolt led by Fidel Castro's 26th of July Movement against the regime of Cuban dictator Fulgencio Batista. It ousted Batista on 1 January 1959, replacing his regime with Castro's revolutionary government. Throughout 1959, Fidel Castro began associating with Communist politicians. The United States response was highly negative, leading to a failed invasion attempt in 1961. The Soviets decided to protect its ally by stationing nuclear weapons in Cuba in 1962. In the Cuban Missile Crisis, the United States vehemently opposed the Soviet Union move. There was serious fear of nuclear war for a few days, but a compromise was reached by which Moscow publicly removed its weapons and the United States secretly removed its weapons from bases in Turkey and promised never to invade Cuba.

=== Prague Spring of 1968 ===
The Czechoslovak Communist Party began an ambitious reform agenda under Alexander Dubček. The plan to limit central control and make the economy more independent of the party threatened bedrock beliefs. On 20 August 1968, Soviet leader Leonid Brezhnev ordered a massive military invasion by Warsaw Pact forces that destroyed the threat of internal liberalization. At the same time, the Soviets threatened retaliation against the British-French-Israeli invasion of Egypt. The upshot was a collapse of any tendency toward détente and the resignations of more intellectuals from communist parties in the West.

=== African communism ===
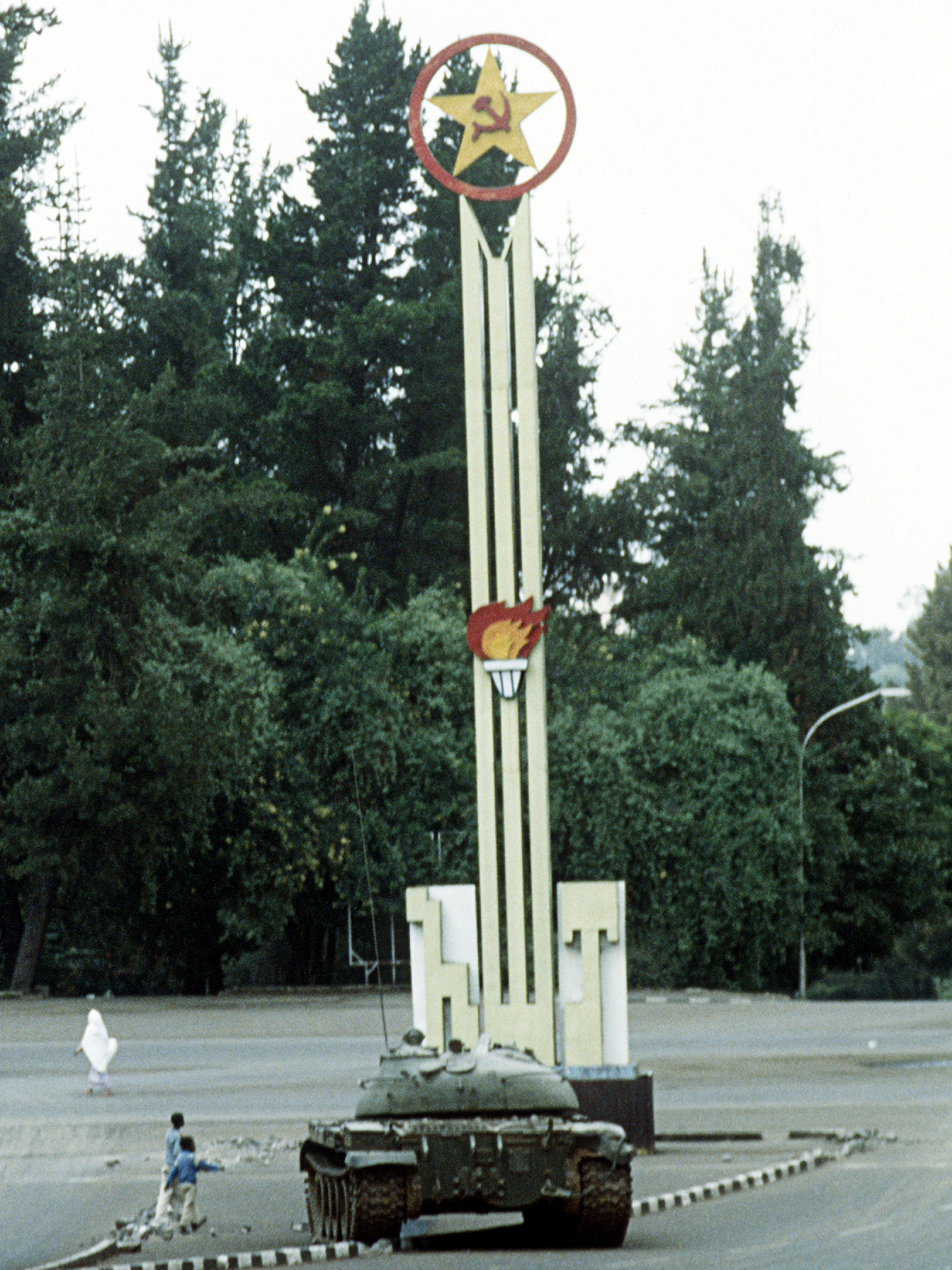
Monument to Marxism built by the Derg in Addis Ababa

During the decolonization of Africa, the Soviet Union took a keen interest in that continent's independence movements and initially hoped that the cultivation of communist client states there would deny their economic and strategic resources to the West. Soviet foreign policy with regard to Africa assumed that newly independent African governments would be receptive to communist ideology and that the Soviets would have the resources to make them attractive as development partners. During the 1970s, the ruling parties of several sub-Saharan African states formally embraced communism, including the People's Republic of Benin, the People's Republic of Mozambique, the People's Republic of the Congo, the People's Democratic Republic of Ethiopia, and the People's Republic of Angola. Most of these regimes ensured the selective adoption and flexible application of communist theory set against a broad ideological commitment to Marxism or Leninism. The adoption of communism was often seen as a means to an end and used to justify the extreme centralization of power.

Angola was perhaps the only African state which made a longstanding commitment to communism, but this was severely hampered by its own war-burdened economy, rampant corruption and practical realities which allowed a few foreign companies to wield considerable influence despite the elimination of the domestic Angolan private sector and a substantial degree of central economic planning. Both Angola and Ethiopia built new social and political institutions modeled closely after those in the Soviet Union and Cuba. However, their regimes either dissolved after the collapse of the Soviet Union due to civil conflict or voluntarily repudiated communism in favour of social democracy.

=== Eurocommunism ===
An important trend in several countries in Western Europe from the late 1960s into the 1980s was Eurocommunism. It was strongest in Spain's PCE, Finland's party and especially in Italy's PCI, where it drew on the ideas of Antonio Gramsci. It was developed by communist party members who were disillusioned with both the Soviet Union and China and sought an independent program. They accepted liberal parliamentary democracy and free speech as well as accepting with some conditions a capitalist market economy. They did not speak of the destruction of capitalism, but sought to win the support of the masses and by a gradual transformation of the bureaucracies. In 1978, the Communist Party of Spain replaced the historic "Marxist–Leninist" catchphrase with the new slogan of "Marxist, democratic and revolutionary". The movement faded in the 1980s and collapsed with the fall of communism in Eastern Europe in 1989.

== End of the Eastern Bloc – Reform and collapse (1980–1992) ==
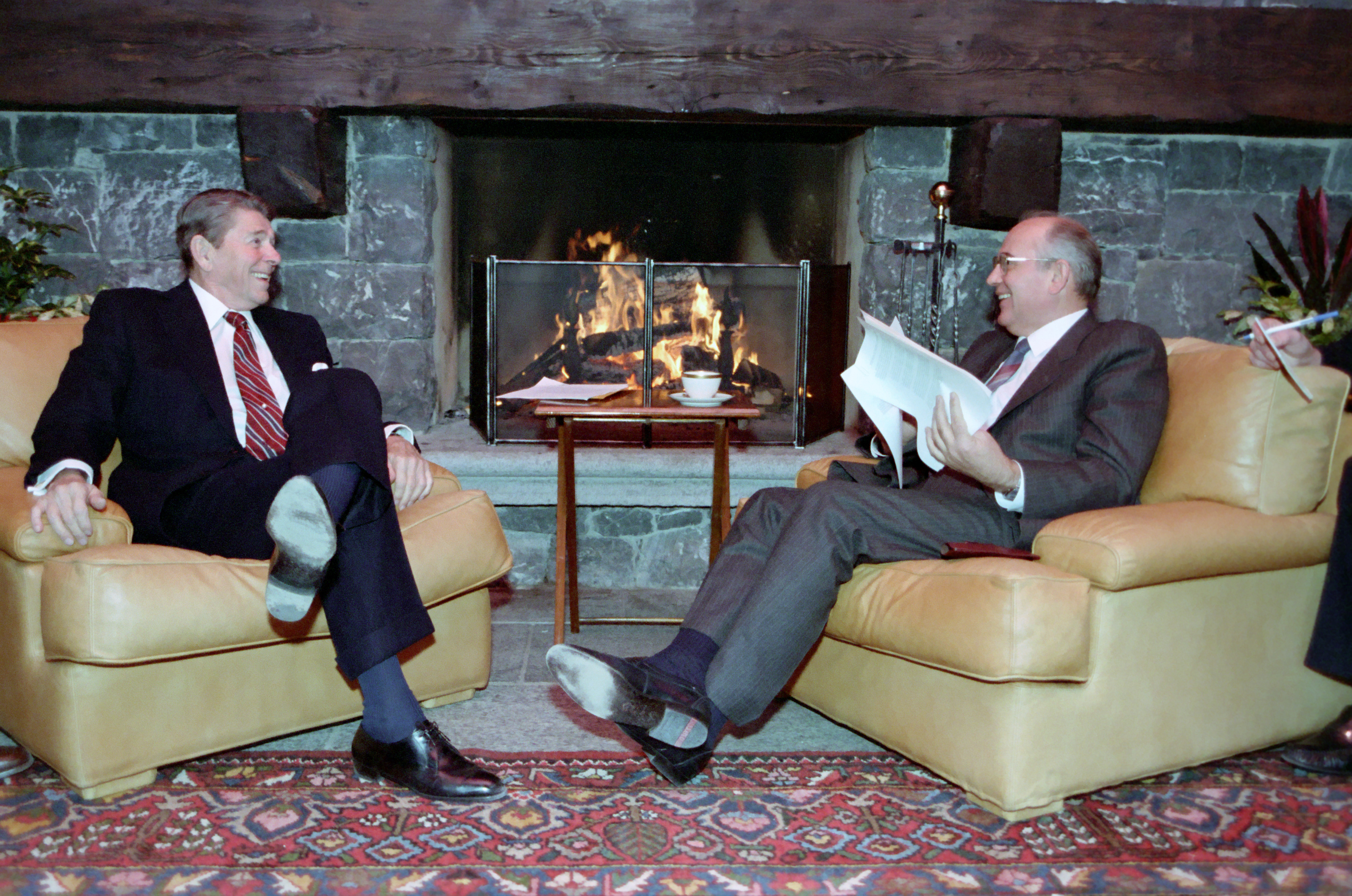
Soviet General Secretary Mikhail Gorbachev, who sought to end the Cold War between the Soviet-led Warsaw Pact and the United States-led NATO and other its other Western allies, in a meeting with President Ronald Reagan

Social resistance to the policies of communist regimes in Eastern Europe accelerated in strength with the rise of the Solidarity, the first non-communist controlled trade union in the Warsaw Pact that was formed in the People's Republic of Poland in 1980.

In 1985, Mikhail Gorbachev rose to power in the Soviet Union and began policies of radical political reform involving political liberalisation called perestroika and glasnost. Gorbachev's policies were designed to dismantle the authoritarian elements of the state that were developed by Stalin, aiming to restore the supposed ideal Leninist state and retaining a one-party structure but allowing the democratic election of competing candidates to political office within the party. Gorbachev also aimed to restore détente with the West and he also aimed to end the Cold War that was being waged by the Soviet Union because it was no longer economically sustainable. The Soviet Union and the United States under President George H. W. Bush joined in pushing for the dismantlement of apartheid and they also oversaw the dismantlement of South African colonial rule of Namibia.

Meanwhile, the Eastern European communist states politically deteriorated in response to the success of the Polish Solidarity movement and the possibility of Gorbachev-style political liberalisation. In 1989, revolts began across Eastern Europe and China against communist regimes. In China, the government refused to negotiate with student protestors, resulting in the Tiananmen Square attacks that stopped the revolts by force.

The opening of a border gate between Austria and Hungary at the Pan-European Picnic on August 19, 1989, then set in motion a peaceful chain reaction, at the end of which there was no longer a GDR and the Eastern Bloc had disintegrated. It was the largest escape movement from East Germany since the Berlin Wall was built in 1961. But with the mass exodus at the Pan-European Picnic, the subsequent hesitant behavior of the Socialist Unity Party of East Germany and the non-intervention of the Soviet Union broke the dams. The revolts culminated with the revolt in East Germany against the communist regime of Erich Honecker. The event in East Germany developed into a popular mass revolt with sections of the Berlin Wall being torn down and East and West Berliners uniting. Gorbachev's refusal to use Soviet forces based in East Germany to suppress the revolt was seen as a sign that the Cold War had ended. Honecker was pressured to resign from office and the new government committed itself to reunification with West Germany. The Communist Party regime of Nicolae Ceaușescu in Romania was forcefully overthrown in the Romanian Revolution of 1989 and Ceaușescu was executed. The other Warsaw Pact regimes also fell during the Revolutions of 1989, with the exception of the Socialist People's Republic of Albania that continued until 1992.

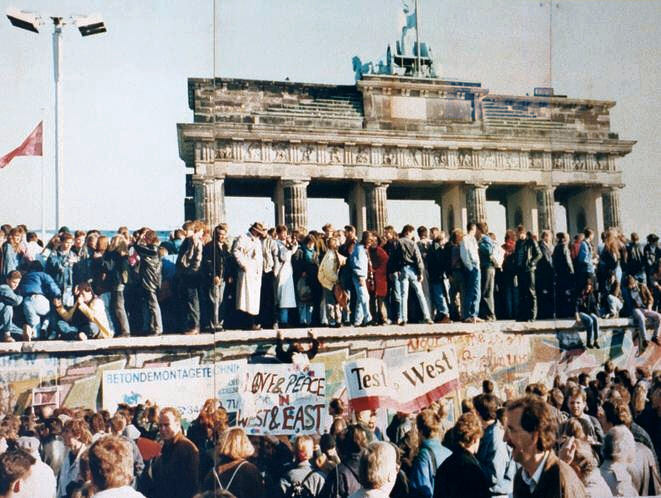
The fall of the Berlin Wall in 1989

Unrest and the eventual collapse of communism also occurred in Yugoslavia, but the collapse of communism in Yugoslavia and the collapse of communism in the Warsaw Pact occurred for different reasons. The death of Josip Broz Tito in 1980 and the subsequent vacuum of strong leadership allowed the rise of rival ethnic nationalism in the multinational country. The first leader to exploit such nationalism for political purposes was Slobodan Milošević, who used Serbian nationalism to seize power as president of Serbia and demanded concessions to the Socialist Republic of Serbia and Serbs by the other republics in the Yugoslav federation. This resulted in a surge of Slovene and Croat nationalism in response and the collapse of the League of Communists of Yugoslavia in 1990, the victory of nationalists in multi-party elections in most of Yugoslavia's constituent republics and eventually civil war between the various nationalities beginning in 1991. Yugoslavia was dissolved in 1992.

The Soviet Union itself collapsed between 1990 and 1991, due to the rise of secessionist nationalism and the outbreak of a political power dispute between Gorbachev and Boris Yeltsin, the new leader of the Russian Federation. The collapse of the Soviet Union was also aided by political pressure from capitalist powers, loans from world banks, and pressure for liberal democracy and increased consumerism within the Soviet Bloc. U.S. monetary and fiscal policy raised interest rates, making borrowing money very difficult for the Soviet Union. With the Soviet Union collapsing, Gorbachev prepared the country to become a loose federation of independent states called the Commonwealth of Independent States. Hardline communist leaders in the military reacted to Gorbachev's policies with the August Coup of 1991 in which hardline communist military leaders overthrew Gorbachev and seized control of the government. This regime only lasted briefly as widespread popular opposition erupted in street protests and refused to submit. Gorbachev was restored to power, but the various Soviet republics were now set for independence. On 25 December 1991, Gorbachev officially announced the dissolution of the Soviet Union, ending the existence of the world's first communist state.

== Contemporary communism (1993–present) ==
With the fall of the communist governments in the Soviet Union and the Eastern Bloc, the influence of state-based Marxist–Leninist ideologies in the world was weakened, but there are still many communist movements of various types and sizes around the world. Other communist nations, particularly those in East Asia such China and Vietnam, moved toward market economies, but without any major privatization of the state sector during the 1980s and 1990s (see socialism with Chinese characteristics and doi moi for more details). Spain, France, Portugal and Greece have strong communist movements that play an open and active role in labor marches and strikes as well as anti-austerity protests. Worldwide marches on International Workers' Day sometimes give a clearer picture of the size and influence of current communist movements, particularly within Europe.

Cuba has recently emerged from the crisis which was sparked by the fall of the Soviet Union due to the growth in the volume of its trade with its new allies, Venezuela and China (the former nation has recently adopted a socialism of the 21st century according to Hugo Chávez). Various other countries in Latin America and the Caribbean have made similar shifts to socialist policies and rhetoric in a phenomenon known as the pink tide.

North Korea claims that its success in avoiding the downfall of socialism is a result of its homegrown ideology of Juche which it adopted in the 1970s, replacing Marxism–Leninism. Cuba has an ambassador to North Korea and China still protects North Korean territorial integrity even as it simultaneously refuses to supply the state with material goods or other significant assistance.

In Nepal, the Communist Party of Nepal (Unified Marxist–Leninist) leader Man Mohan Adhikari briefly became Prime Minister of Nepal and national leader from 1994 to 1995 and the Maoist guerrilla leader Prachanda was elected prime minister by the Constituent Assembly of Nepal in 2008. Prachanda has since been deposed as prime minister, leading the Maoists to abandon their legalistic approach and return to their typical street actions and militancy and to lead sporadic general strikes using their quite substantial influence on the Nepalese labor movement. Since 2008, Nepal has been ruled by a coalition of communist parties: Communist Party of Nepal (Unified Marxist–Leninist) and Communist Party of Nepal (Maoist Centre) which merged in 2018 in the Nepal Communist Party.

The previous national government of India depended on the parliamentary support of the Communist Party of India (Marxist) and Communist Party of India. Presently CPI(M) along with CPI leads the state government in Kerala. The armed wing of the Communist Party of India (Maoist), the People's Liberation Guerrilla Army, is fighting the Naxalite–Maoist insurgency against the Government of India and is active in some parts of the country. Indian government forces have been successful in eliminating insurgency to quite an extent.

In Cyprus, the veteran communist Dimitris Christofias of AKEL won the 2008 presidential election, the first and only communist head of state of a European Union country.

In Ukraine and Russia, Communist parties came second in the 2002 Ukrainian parliamentary election and the 2003 Russian legislative election, respectively. The Communist Party of the Russian Federation remains strong in Russia, but the 2014 Ukrainian parliamentary election following the Russian invasion of Ukraine and the annexation of Crimea resulted in the loss of its 32 members and no Verkhovna Rada representation by the Communist Party of Ukraine. The party has been banned since 2015.

In the Czech Republic, the Communist Party of Bohemia and Moravia came third in the 2002 elections as did the Portuguese Communist Party in 2005.

In South Africa, the South African Communist Party (SACP) is a member of the Tripartite alliance alongside the African National Congress and the Congress of South African Trade Unions.

Sri Lanka has communist ministers in its national governments and Janatha Vimukthi Peramuna and the National People's Power alliance came to power in 2024.

In Zimbabwe, former president Robert Mugabe of the Zimbabwe African National Union – Patriotic Front, the country's longstanding leader, was a professed communist.

Colombia has been in the midst of a civil war which has been waged since 1966 between the Colombian government and aligned right-wing paramilitaries against two communist guerrilla groups, namely the Revolutionary Armed Forces of Colombia–People's Army (FARC–EP) and the National Liberation Army (ELN).

As of the early 2020s, the Philippines is experiencing a low-scale guerrilla insurgency by the New People's Army, the armed wing of the outlawed Communist Party of the Philippines.

== See also ==
- The Black Book of Communism
- Comecon
- Cominform
- Communist Party Historians Group
- Comparison of Nazism and Stalinism
- Crimes against humanity under communist regimes
- Criticism of communist party rule
- History of socialism
- List of communist ideologies
- Mass killings under communist regimes
- Post-communism
- Soviet empire
- Warsaw Pact
