= Victor d'Hupay =

French communist, 1746–1818

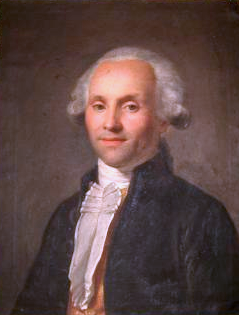
- Portrait of Victor d'Hupay (ca.1790)
- Born: 1746; La Tour-d'Aigues, Provence, France
- Died: 1818 (Aged 72); Fuveau, Bouches-du-Rhône, France

Joseph Alexandre Victor d'Hupay (1746–1818) was a French writer and philosopher. He is known for being perhaps the first writer to use the term communism in its modern sense. He wished to transform the ideals of the Enlightenment philosophers into practice.

== Life and works ==
In 1746 Victor d'Hupay was born into an aristocratic family in the village of La Tour-d'Aigues in the Luberon, Provence.

d'Hupay began writing his first texts concerning the rural economy when he was seventeen years old. He believed agriculture to be the basis of wealth, and endorsed the physiocrats that advocated an economy based upon it just as Marquis de Mirabeau did.

He approved of Baron de La Tour-d'Aigues, who was interested in land development and had one of the largest libraries of the time on this subject. d'Hupay challenged the display of wealth of Bruny, and other barons, because he, as an advocate of Rousseau, wanted a simpler more rural life away from the tumult of cities. He read Enlightenment philosophers, and wished to put their ideas into action.

In 1770, he bought the bastide of Puget in Fuveau, thus acquiring his rights as a nobleman. During his life, Victor d'Hupay divided his time between La Tour-d'Aigues, Aix-en-Provence and the neighbouring village of Fuveau, to the south of Montagne Sainte-Victoire. The restored family bastide in Fuveau was run according to his principles. Once his country house in Fuveau was restored, he published his first book, Projet de communauté philosophe, which promoted the idea of living in a sort of commune. In the book, he told how he wanted to gather in his new home a group of friends for a life in community.

In 1785, he defined himself as a communist author – a word that had existed since the twelfth century to designate certain forms of pooling of goods – in the sense of an advocate of the community of goods. About this time, just before the French Revolution, he was referred to as a communist in a book review by Restif de la Bretonne; according to some sources, this was the first time that the word "communism" was used in print in its modern sense.

During the Revolution, Victor d'Hupay became enthusiastic about some new ideas. He corresponded with Mirabeau and Bernardin de Saint-Pierre. He presented several projects of national education and models of government to the National Assembly, and militated for the abolition of marriage, which he saw as a form of property owning. Despite his commitment to the revolution, he was imprisoned during the Terror and his house was looted. He authored a limited volume of work during the Empire and died at Fuveau in 1818, at the age of seventy-two.
