= Étienne-Gabriel Morelly =

Utopian thinker and novelist

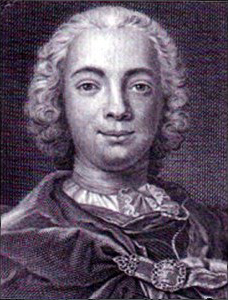
- Born: 1717; Vitry-le-François, Kingdom of France
- Died: 1778 (aged 60–61)

Philosophical work
- Era: 18th-century philosophy
- Region: Western Philosophy
- School: Utopian socialism
- Main interests: Political philosophy

Étienne-Gabriel Morelly (French: [etjɛn gabʁjɛl mɔʁɛli]; 1717–1778) was a French utopian thinker, philosopher and novelist. An otherwise "obscure tax official", and teacher, Morelly wrote two books on education, a critique of Montesquieu and The Code of Nature, which was published anonymously in France in 1755. This book, initially attributed to philosophes including Rousseau and Diderot, criticised contemporary society, postulated a social order without avarice, and proposed a constitution intended to lead to an egalitarian society without property, marriage, church or police.

== Outline ==
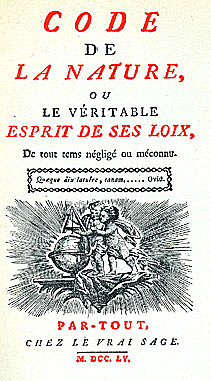
Frontispiece of "Code de la Nature, ou le véritable Esprit de ses Loix." (1755)

According to The Code of Nature, "...where no property exists, none of its pernicious consequences could exist...." As Morelly believed that almost all social and moral ills were a consequence of private property, his proposed constitution eliminates most private property. As a result of this latter characteristic of his utopia, Morelly is often seen as a significant forerunner of later socialist and communist thinkers. François-Noël Babeuf, Charles Fourier, Pierre-Joseph Proudhon, Louis Blanc, Friedrich Engels, and Karl Marx all discussed Morelly's ideas in their own writing.

Among the "sacred and fundamental laws" Morelly proposed was "Nothing in society will belong to anyone, either as a personal possession or as capital goods, except the things for which the person has immediate use, for either his needs, his pleasures, or his daily work." He was opposed to the possession of property beyond what an individual needed and, especially, to private property used to employ others. According to Morelly, "All.. durable products will be gathered together in public stores in order to be distributed to all the citizens, daily or at some other specified interval..."

He also proposed banning of trade between individuals: "In accordance with the sacred laws, nothing will be sold or exchanged between citizens. Someone who needs, for example greens, vegetables or fruits, will go to the public square, which is where these items will have been brought by the man who cultivate them, and take what he needs for one day only."

== Works ==
- Essai sur l'esprit humain, 1743
- Essai sur le coeur humain, 1745
- Le Prince, les délices des coeurs, ou traité des qualités d'un grand roi et système d'un sage gouvernement [The Prince, the delights of the heart, or, A treatise on the qualities of a great king and system of wise government], 1751
- Naufrage des isles flottantes, ou Basiliade du célèbre Pilpai, 1753
- Code de la nature, ou le véritable esprit de ses lois, 1755

== See also ==
- From each according to his ability, to each according to his needs
