= Nicolas Restif de la Bretonne =

French novelist (1734–1806)

Nicolas Restif de la Bretonne

Nicolas Restif de la Bretonne, born Nicolas-Edme Rétif or Nicolas-Edme Restif (French: [ʁetif]; 23 October 1734 – 3 February 1806), also known as Rétif, was a French novelist. The term retifism for shoe fetishism was named after him (an early novel, entitled Fanchette's Foot, concerns a woman and her pretty little foot, which, with her pretty face, gets her and her shoe/s into much trouble). He was also reputed to have invented the term "pornographer" for the same-named book, The Pornographer.

== Biography ==
Born the son of a farmer at Sacy (in the present Yonne), Restif was educated by the Jansenists at Bicêtre, and at the expulsion of the Jansenists was received by one of his brothers, who was a curé. Owing to a scandal in which he was involved, he was apprenticed to a printer at Auxerre, and, having served his time, went to Paris. Here he worked as a journeyman printer, and in 1760 he married Anne or Agnès Lebègue, a relation of his former master at Auxerre. Soon, he converted to Protestantism.

It was not until five or six years after his marriage that Restif became an author, and from that time to his death he produced a bewildering multitude of books, amounting to something like two hundred volumes, many of them printed with his own hands, on many different subjects. Restif suffered at one time or another the extremes of poverty. He drew on the episodes of his own life for his books, which, "in spite of their faded sentiment, contain truthful pictures of French society on the eve of the Revolution". He has been described as both a social realist and a sexual fantasist in his writings. The original editions are rare, notable for the unique typographic system and illustration style.

The end of the assignats during the Revolution forced him to make his living by writing, profiting by the new freedom of the press. In 1795 he received a gratuity of 2000 francs from the Thermidor Convention. In spite of his declarations in favor of the new power, his aristocratic acquaintances and his reputation made him disreputable. Just before his death, Napoleon gave him a job with the ministry of police; he died at Paris before beginning the job.

== Assessment ==
According to the Encyclopædia Britannica Eleventh Edition,

Restif de la Bretonne undoubtedly holds a remarkable place in French literature. He was inordinately vain, of extremely relaxed morals, and perhaps not entirely sane. His books were written with haste, and their licence of subject and language renders them quite unfit for general perusal.

He and the Marquis de Sade maintained a mutual contempt, while he was appreciated by Benjamin Constant and Friedrich von Schiller and dined with Alexandre Balthazar Laurent Grimod de La Reynière, whom he met in 1782. Jean François de La Harpe nicknamed him "the Voltaire of the chambermaids". His work was republicized by the Surrealists during the early 20th century.

He is noted also for his advocacy of communism, indeed the term first made its modern appearance (1785) in his book review of Joseph-Alexandre-Victor Hupay de Fuveau who described himself as "communist" with his Project for a Philosophical Community.

The author Mario Vargas Llosa has a chapter on Restif in his novel The Notebooks of Don Rigoberto.

The French novelist Catherine Rihoit made Restif de la Bretonne a major character of her 1982 novel La Nuit de Varenne. It was made into a movie during the same year, a French-Italian production named La Nuit de Varennes (French title, in English, That Night in Varennes) or Il mondo nuovo (Italian title, in English, The New World). Jean-Louis Barrault played Restif. The movie also had Marcello Mastroianni as Casanova and Harvey Keitel as Thomas Paine.

In his analysis of the satirical poem "Ode To Buggers," David M. Halperin suggested that Restif's writing may have drawn from internal conflicts surrounding his sexuality. There is much scholarly debate concerning the veracity of this conclusion.

Restif was a "pornographer" in the modern sense of the word, being a writer of graphic depictions of sex. However, he was also a "pornographer" in the Ancient Greek sense of the word, as he wrote about the day-to-day life of prostitutes, and concerned himself with their well-being. It was the latter definition which he accepted as the rightful use of the word.

== Works ==
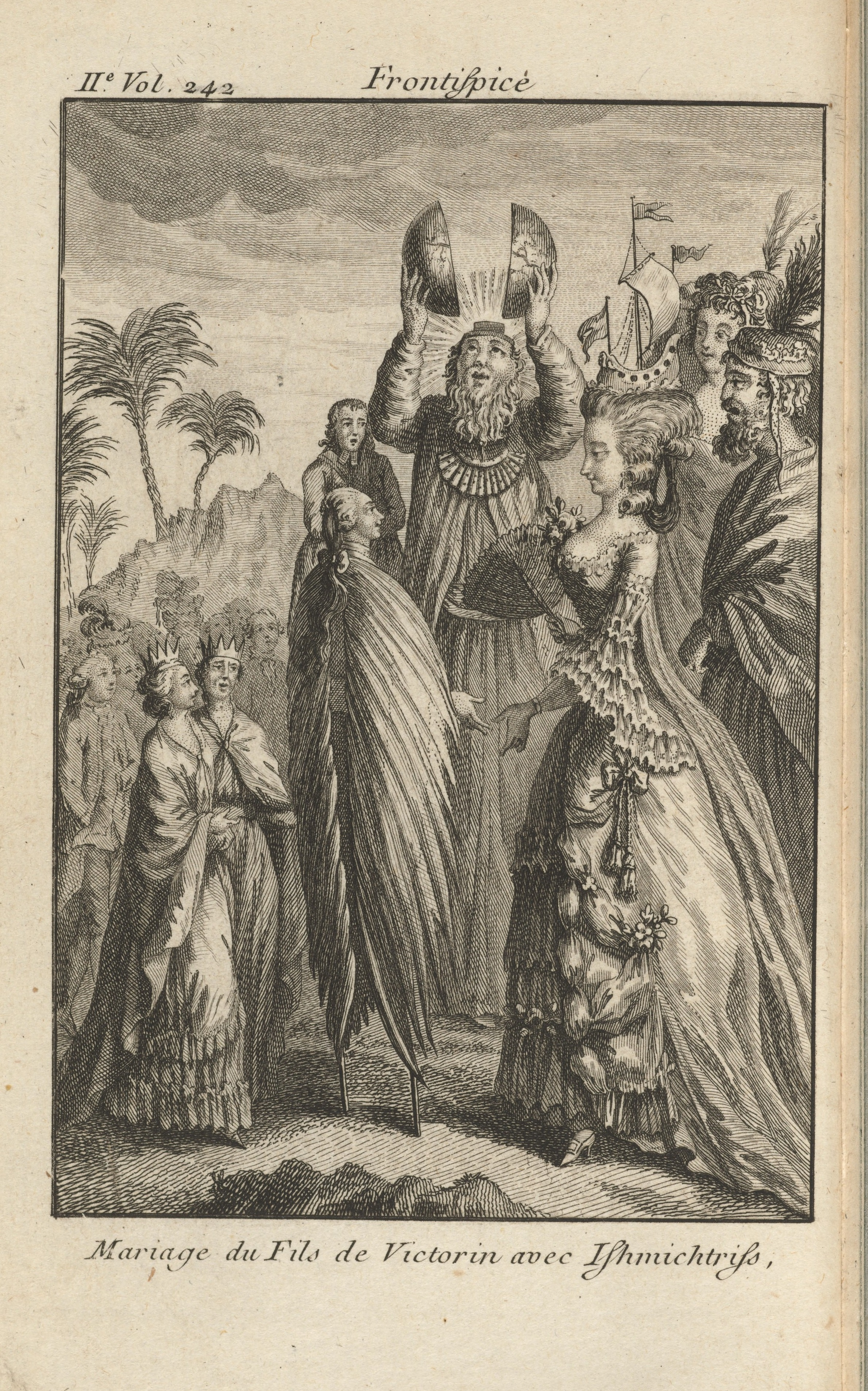
Frontispiece from La Découverte Australe par un Homme Volant, 1781.

The most noteworthy of his works are:

- Le Pied de Fanchette, a novel (1769), the story of a pretty French orphan girl who is hounded by shoe-fetishists.
- Le Pornographe (1769), a plan for regulating prostitution which is said to have been actually decreed by the Emperor Joseph II, and some detached elements have been adopted by continental nations.
- Le Paysan perverti (1775), an erotic novel with a moral purpose, which was a success, causing him to follow it with "La Paysanne Pervertie" (1784).
- La Vie de mon père (1779).
- La Découverte Australe par un Homme-Volant (1781), a work of proto-science-fiction known for its prophetic inventions.
- Les Contemporaines (42 vols., 1780–1785), a vast collection of short stories.
- Ingenue Saxancour, a novel (1785).
- Les Nuits de Paris (beginning 1786: reportage including the September Massacres of 1792).
- Anti-Justine (1793), a response to the earlier editions of the Marquis de Sade's Justine.
- The extraordinary autobiography of Monsieur Nicolas (16 vols., 1794–1797), in which at the age of sixty he has set down his remembrances, his notions on ethical and social points, his hatreds, and above all his numerous loves, both real and fancied. In it, Restif relates the beginnings of his sexual awakenings between 1738 and 1744, when he remembers experiencing sexual stimulations during very early childhood. However, the last two volumes are practically a separate and much less interesting work in the opinion of the redactors of the 1911 Encyclopædia Britannica.
- Les Posthumes (1802) is an example of early space opera and an exercise of exolinguistics.

== Works in English translation ==
- Monsieur Nicolas; Or, The Human Heart Unveiled: The Intimate Memoirs of Restif de la Bretonne (6 Volume Set). J. Rodker. 1931. ASIN B0006DCVPI.
- Monsieur Nicolas; Or, The Human Heart Unveiled: Abridged Edition, Translated and edited by Robert Baldick. Mayflower. 1968.
- Les Nuits de Paris; or, The Nocturnal Spectator: A Selection. Random House Books. 1964. ASIN B0007DL5YA.
- Fanchette's Pretty Little Foot: The French Orphan Girl. Sunny Lou Publishing. 2020. ISBN 978-1735477619.
- The Perverted Peasant, or The Dangers of the City (Parts 1 and 2). Sunny Lou Publishing. 2024. ISBN 978-1955392716.
- The Pornographer. Sunny Lou Publishing. 2021. ISBN 978-1955392099.
- The Discovery of the Austral Continent by a Flying Man. Black Coat Press. 2016. ISBN 978-1612275123.

== See also ==
- Society of the Friends of Truth
- Victor d'Hupay
- Projet de communauté philosophe
