= Projet de communauté philosophe =

1777 book by Victor d'Hupay

Projet de communauté philosophe (translated as Project for a Philosophical Community) is a book written by the French philosopher Victor d'Hupay, published in 1777.

== Review ==
This book can be seen as a cornerstone in the history of communism, as it describes for the first time how "communists" (people living in a "commune") should understand this philosophy. In this work, the author advises to "share all economic and material products between inhabitants of the 'commune', so that all may benefit from everybody's work". Later, in a 1785 letter to friend Restif de la Bretonne, d'Hupay would describe himself as a "communist" author.

The book was partly written in d'Hupay's own bastide in Meyreuil, near Aix-en-Provence, where he was determined to set his own commune and live by the communist philosophy, with neighbours and friends.

== Additional information ==
There is currently only one known public copy of this original edition, which is kept at the Diderot Library in Lyon.
