= Communism in France =

Communism (French: Communisme) has been a part of French politics since the early 20th century at the latest. It has been described as "an enduring presence on the French political scene" for most of the 20th century.

In 1920, the French Section of the Communist International was founded. This organization went on to become the French Communist Party (Parti communiste français, PCF). Following World War II, the French Communist Party joined the government led by Charles de Gaulle before being dropped by the coalition. From November 1946 to 1956, the French Communist Party won more votes than any other party in the French national elections. After 1956, their share of the vote gradually declined.

In addition to the main French Communist Party, there have been multiple other communist parties in France, and some of these are still in operation today.

== History ==
=== Early modern period ===
During the early modern period in Europe, various groups supporting communist ideas appeared. In the 18th century, the French philosopher Jean Jacques Rousseau in his hugely influential The Social Contract (1762) outlined the basis for a political order based on popular sovereignty rather than the rule of monarchs. His views proved instrumental during the French Revolution of 1789 in which various anti-monarchists, particularly the Jacobins, supported the idea of redistributing wealth equally among the people, including Jean-Paul Marat and Gracchus Babeuf. The latter was involved in the Conspiracy of the Equals of 1796 intending to establish a revolutionary regime based on communal ownership, egalitarianism and the redistribution of property. However, the plot was detected and he and several others involved were arrested and executed. Despite this setback, the example of the French Revolutionary regime and Babeuf's doomed insurrection was an inspiration for radical French thinkers such as Henri de Saint-Simon, Louis Blanc, Charles Fourier and Pierre-Joseph Proudhon, who declared that "property is theft!"

=== 19th century ===
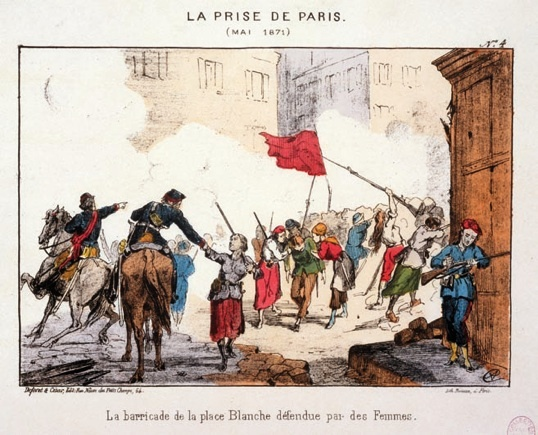
Moloch. La barricade de la place Blanche défendue par des femmes lors de la Semaine sanglante

By the 1830s and 1840s, the egalitarian concepts of communism and the related ideas of socialism had become widely popular in French revolutionary circles thanks to the writings of social critics and philosophers such as Pierre Leroux and Théodore Dézamy, whose critiques of bourgeoisie liberalism led to a widespread intellectual rejection of laissez-faire capitalism on both economic, philosophical and moral grounds. Importantly, Philippe Buonarroti, one of Babeuf's co-conspirators, survived the crackdown on the Conspiracy of the Equals and went on to write the influential book History of Babeuf's Conspiracy for Equality first published in 1828. Buonarroti's works and teachings went on to inspire early Babouvist communist groups, such as the Christian communist League of the Just in 1836 led by Wilhelm Weitling, which would later be merged with the Communist Correspondence Committee in Brussels. This merger of the two groups in 1847 formed the Communist League, headed by German socialist labour leader Karl Schapper, who then that same year tasked two founding members, Karl Marx and Friedrich Engels, to write a manifesto laying out the principles of the new political party.

During the latter half of the 19th century, various left-wing organisations across Europe continued to campaign against the many autocratic right-wing regimes that were then in power. In France, socialists set up a government known as the Paris Commune after the fall of Napoleon III in 1871, but they were soon overthrown and many of their members executed by counter-revolutionaries.

=== 20th century ===
In Europe, front organizations were especially influential in France, which became the base for communist front organizer Willi Münzenberg in 1933.

During the Sino-Soviet split, the French Communist Party aligned with the Soviet perspective.

By the middle of the 1960s, the French Communist Party lost members and sympathizers due to its ambivalent positions during the Algerian war and its perceived excessive focus on class and inadequate focus on imperialism and race.

French Maoism developed after the Sino-Soviet split and particularly between 1966 and 1976. After May 68, the cultural influence of French Maoists increased. Maoists became the first group of French intellectuals to emphasize gay and lesbian rights in their publications and contributed to the nascent feminist movement in France.

==== Eurocommunism ====
Eurocommunism, a revisionist trend in the 1970s and 1980s within various Western European communist parties, was especially prominent in France. They claimed to be developing a theory and practice of social transformation more relevant for Western Europe. During the Cold War, they sought to undermine the influence of the Soviet Union and the Communist Party of the Soviet Union.

== See also ==
- Alternative libertaire
- French Communist Party
  - History of the French Communist Party
- Independent Workers' Party
- Marxist–Leninist Communist Organization – Proletarian Way
- Pole of Communist Revival in France
- Workers' Communist Party of France
