= Jacobin (politics) =

Member of the revolutionary movement

A Jacobin (/ˈdʒækəbɪn/; French pronunciation: [ʒakɔbɛ̃]) was a member of the Jacobin Club, a revolutionary political movement that was the most famous political club during the French Revolution (1789–1799). The club got its name from meeting at the Dominican rue Saint-Honoré Monastery of the Jacobins. The Dominicans in France were called Jacobins (Latin: Jacobus, corresponds to Jacques in French and Jack in English) because their first house in Paris was the Saint Jacques Monastery.

The terms Jacobin and Jacobinism have been used in a variety of senses. Prior to 1793, the terms were used by contemporaries to describe the politics of Jacobins in the congresses of 1789 through 1792. With the ascendancy of Maximilien Robespierre and the Montagnards into 1793, they have since become synonymous with the policies of the Reign of Terror, with Jacobinism now meaning "Robespierrism". As Jacobinism was memorialized through legend, heritage, tradition and other historical means over the centuries, the term acquired a "semantic elasticity" in French politics of the late 20th Century with a "vague range of meanings", but all with the "central figure of a sovereign and indivisible public authority with power over civil society." Today in France, Jacobin colloquially indicates an ardent or republican supporter of a centralized and revolutionary democracy or state as well as "a politician who is hostile to any idea of weakening and dismemberment of the State."

== In the French Revolution ==
The Jacobin Club was one of several organizations that grew out of the French Revolution and it was distinguished for its left-wing, revolutionary politics. Because of this, the Jacobins, unlike other sects such as the Girondins (who were originally part of the Jacobins, but branched off), were closely allied to the sans-culottes, who were a popular force of working-class Parisians that played a pivotal role in the development of the revolution.

The Jacobins had a significant presence in the National Convention; they were dubbed "the mountain" or Montagnards for their seats in the uppermost part of the chamber. Eventually, the Revolution coalesced around The Mountain's power, with the help of the insurrections of the sans-culottes, and, led by Robespierre, the Jacobins established a revolutionary dictatorship, or the joint domination of the Committee of Public Safety and Committee of General Security.

The Jacobins were known for creating a strong government that could deal with the needs of war, economic chaos, as well as internal rebellion (such as the war in the Vendée). This included establishing the world's first universal military draft as a solution to filling army ranks to put down civil unrest and prosecute war. The Jacobin dictatorship was known for enacting the Reign of Terror, which targeted speculators, monarchists, Girondin, Hébertists, and alleged traitors, and led to many beheadings.

The Jacobins supported the rights of property, but represented a much more middle-class position than the government that succeeded them in Thermidor.

They favored free trade and a market economy much like the Girondists, but their relationship to the people made them more willing to adopt interventionist economic policies. Unlike the Girondins, their economic policy favored price controls (i.e., General maximum) on staples like grain and select household and grocery goods to address economic problems. Using the armée revolutionnaire, they targeted farmers, the rich and others who may have stocks of essential goods ("goods of the first necessity") in service of a national distribution system with severe punishment for uncooperative hoarders.

Another tenet of Jacobinism is a secularism that includes the elimination of existing religions in favor of one run by the state (i.e., the cults of Reason and the Supreme Being).

Jacobinism was as an ideology thus developed and implemented during the French Revolution of 1789. In the words of François Furet, in Penser la révolution française (quoted by Hoel in Introduction au Jacobinisme...), "Jacobinism is both an ideology and a power: a system of representations and a system of action." ("le jacobinisme est à la fois une idéologie et un pouvoir : un système de représentations et un système d'action"). Its political goals were largely achieved later during France's Third Republic.

== France ==
Jacobinism did not end with the Jacobins. The Robespierrist François-Noël Babeuf eventually rejected the rule of the Jacobins and welcomed the end of the Terror. However, he later eschewed the Thermidorean Reaction that overthrew the Jacobins and he returned to Robespierrism. In May 1796, he led a failed coup d'état with neo-Robespierrists to attempt to return the republic to the Montagnard Constitution of 1793 in the Conspiracy of Equals. His political ideology was a form of neo-Jacobinism and primordial communism that highlighted egalitarian division of all land and property enforced by a dictatorship run by the Equals. His ideas were widely publicized and further developed as "Babeuvism" by colleague Filippo Buonaroti in his 1828 book, Histoire de la Conspiration Pour l'Égalité Dite de Babeuf (History of Babeuf's Conspiracy for Equality).

Friedrich Engels and Karl Marx called the Conspiracy of Equals "the first appearance of a truly active Communist party." Leon Trotsky echoed these sentiments, stating that the foundation of the Communist International marked a "carrying on in direct succession the heroic endeavours and martyrdom of a long line of revolutionary generations from Babeuf."

Himself a Robespierrist, Buonaroti went on to write Observations sur Maximilien Robespierre in 1836, which extolled the Jacobin leader as a legend and hero. His portrayal of Robespierre as a model for socialist revolutionaries greatly influenced young socialists and republicans, such as Albert Laponneraye.

The 19th century socialist firebrand, nationalist and founder of Blanquism, Louis Auguste Blanqui expressed admiration for Jacobin leaders of the Terror like Robespierre and Louis Antoine de Saint-Just, framing them in messianic terms. There is evidence that his principles were also instructed by Babeuvism through his familiarity with Buonarroti. After the French Revolution of 1848, he criticized contemporaries who claimed to be heirs of Jacobinism, writing: "Our own self-styled Montagnards are a caricature, indeed a very poor copy, of the Girondins." His view of Robespierre later changed over an understanding of the Terror's executions of Georges Danton and the Hébertists, as well as the formation of the Cult of the Supreme Being, the latter due to Blanqui's promotion of materialism and atheism. According to Blanqui, the Hebertists were the true revolutionaries in defending atheism, science and equality. He said that socialism needed to be built on the foundations laid by the French Revolution, and would better defend the ideals of the Enlightenment than Jacobinism, adding the toast, "Citizens, the Mountain is dead! To socialism, its sole heir!"

Various French left-wing parties would claim to be the "true heirs" to the French Revolution and the 1871 Paris Commune. Aspects of Blanqui were likewise claimed by French political groups like the Radical Socialists and the Stalinists. Other organizations included the French Central Revolutionary Committee and its successor, the Socialist Revolutionary Party, and the Blanquist section of the International Workingmen's Association or First International.

On 4 October 1919, Alexandre Varenne founded the socialist daily La Montagne, Quotidien de la Démocratie Socialiste du Center. The title was selected to reflect its alignment with the ideas of the Montagnards.

In the 1930s, the Popular Front coalition included the French Communist Party or Parti communiste français (PCF), who along with portions of the alliance's socialist French Section of the Workers' International (SFIO) party increasingly emphasized patriotism. The PCF were characterized as "New Jacobins", and their leader Maurice Thorez as a "Stalinist Jacobin".

Apart from Marxism, the movement of Neosocialism and its founder Marcel Déat who was a collaborator with Vichy and the Nazis, was known to be inspired by Jacobin politics and claimed its heritage .

== Haiti ==
The Haitian Revolution (1791–1804), led by Toussaint L'Ouverture, is the only successful revolt of enslaved people to create an independent nation and abolish the slave society. In the historiography on Haiti, these revolutionaries are often called "Black Jacobins," beginning with Trinidadian historian C. L. R. James' seminal book The Black Jacobins, in 1938.

== India ==
In 1794, Frenchmen in the Kingdom of Mysore allegedly established the "Jacobin Club of Mysore" with the assistance of its ruler Tipu Sultan, who purportedly declared himself "Citizen Tipoo". During the subsequent Fourth Anglo-Mysore War of 1799, British forces captured French volunteers led by François Ripaud who were serving under Mysorean command. French historian Jean Boutier argued that senior officials of the East India Company fabricated the club's existence to justify their war against Mysore.

== Italy ==
Blanquism had a notable influence on Benito Mussolini who founded fascism as an outgrowth of revolutionary socialism. He claimed he "introduced into Italian socialism something of (Henri) Bergson mixed with much of Blanqui," including Blanqui's nationalism, the idea of rule by a dominant minority and use of violence. However, Mussolini dispensed with Blanquism's links to the Enlightenment and communism and instead stated, fascism is "opposed to all individualistic abstractions based on eighteenth century materialism; and it is opposed to all Jacobinistic utopias and innovations." The masthead of his newspaper Il Popolo d'Italia carried quotes from Blanqui ("Whoever has steel has bread") and Napoleon Bonaparte ("The Revolution is an idea which has found bayonets!"). Leon Trotsky called fascism in a sense "a caricature of Jacobinism".

== Poland ==
King Stanisław II August was enamored with the American Constitution, the ideals of the Gironde of 1790–1792, and the office of Roi Citoyen ("Citizen King"). He helped develop the 1791 Polish Constitution which embraced social reforms guaranteeing "the freedom, property and equality of every citizen." Its ratification led some Society of the Friends of the Constitution chapters to endorse the King and his Rzeczypospolita and helped shape the French constitution adopted later that year.

While the Constitutionalists had contacts with Jacobin Clubs, they were expressly not Jacobins. However prior to the 1792 war that crushed the republic, Russian Empress Catherine the Great claimed the constitution was the work of the Jacobins and that she would be "fighting Jacobinism in Poland" and "the Jacobins of Warsaw".

== Russia and Soviet Union ==
The 1870s saw the emergence of the "Worker's Marseillaise", a Russian revolutionary song set to a Robert Schumann melody inspired by the 1792 "Marseillaise". It was used as a national anthem by the Russian Provisional Government and in Soviet Russia for a short time alongside "The Internationale".

In the early 20th Century, Bolshevism and Jacobinism were linked. Russia's notion of the French Revolution permeated educated society and was reflected in speeches and writings of leaders, including Joseph Stalin, Leon Trotsky and Vladimir Lenin. They modeled their revolution after the Jacobins and the Terror with Trotsky even envisioning a trial for Nicholas II akin to that for Louis XVI. Lenin regarded the execution of the former tsar and his immediate family as necessary, highlighting the precedent set in the French Revolution. At the same time, the Bolsheviks consciously tried to avoid the mistakes they saw made by the French revolutionaries.

Lenin referred to Robespierre as a "Bolshevik avant la lettre" and erected a statue to him. Other statues were planned or erected of other prominent members of the Terror as well as Babeuf. The Voskresenskaya Embankment in St. Petersburg was also renamed Naberezhnaya Robespera for the French leader in 1923; it was returned to its original name in 2014.

Like Karl Marx, Lenin saw the overall progress in events in France from 1789 through 1871 as the French Bourgeois Revolution. He adhered to the Montagnards' policies of centralization of authority to stabilize a new state, the virtue and necessity of terror against oppressors and "an alliance between the proletariat and peasantry" ("the revolutionary-democratic dictatorship of the proletariat and the peasants"). He would refer to his side as the Mountain or Jacobin and label his Menshevik opponents as the "Gironde".

== United Kingdom ==
The conventionalized scrawny, French revolutionary sans-culottes Jacobin, was developed from about 1790 by British satirical artists James Gillray, Thomas Rowlandson and George Cruikshank. It was commonly contrasted with the stolid stocky conservative and well-meaning John Bull, dressed like an English country squire.

Thomas Paine was a believer in the French Revolution and supported the Girondins. At the same time, Protestant Dissenters seeking for relief from the Test and Corporation Acts supported the French Revolution at least in its early stages after seeing concessions to religious minorities by the French authorities in 1787 and in the Declaration of Rights of Man. Paine's publications enjoyed support by Painite Radical factions like the Manchester Constitutional Society. Prominent members of the Society who worked for the Radical Manchester Herald newspaper even contacted the Jacobin Club in France on 13 April 1792. Thus, Radicals were labeled Jacobins by their opponents. Regional Painite radicalism was incorrectly portrayed as English Jacobinism and were attacked by Conservative forces including Edmund Burke as early as 1791. The London Revolution Society also corresponded with the National Assembly starting in November 1789. Their letters were circulated among the regional Jacobin clubs, with around 52 clubs corresponding with the society by the spring of 1792. Other regional British revolutionary societies formed in centers of British Jacobinism. English Jacobins included the young Samuel Taylor Coleridge, William Wordsworth and others prior to their disillusionment with the outbreak of the Reign of Terror. Others, such as Paine, William Hazlitt and Whig statesman Charles James Fox, remained idealistic about the Revolution.

The London Corresponding Society founded in 1792 was partly modeled on the Jacobins to pressure the government in a law-abiding manner for democratic reform. Scottish chapters of the Societies of the Friends of the People pressed for parliamentary reform at the 1792 Scottish Convention in Edinburgh using explicit imitations of the Jacobins.

Overall, after 1793 with the sidelining of the Girondins and the Terror, "Jacobin" became a pejorative for radical left-wing revolutionary politics and was linked to sedition. The word was further promoted in England by George Canning's 1797–98 newspaper Anti-Jacobin and later, John Gifford's 1798–1821 Anti-Jacobin Review, which both criticized the English Radicals of the 18th and 19th centuries. Much detail on English Jacobinism can be found in E. P. Thompson's The Making of the English Working Class.

Welsh Jacobins include William Jones, a radical patriot who was a keen disciple of Voltaire. Rather than preaching revolution, Jones believed that an exodus from Wales was required and that a new Welsh colony should be founded in the United States.

The socialist Chartist movement in the first half of the 19th Century was inspired by Robespierre. Chartist leader James Bronterre O'Brien defended Robespierre, describing him as "one of the greatest men, and one of the purest and most enlightened reformers, that ever existed in the world." He came to Robespierre through his studies of Buonarroti and even served as Buonarroti's translator for the English edition of Buanarroti's History of Babeuf's Conspiracy for Equality, for which he further included his own observations.

== Austria ==
In the correspondence of Austrian statesman and diplomat Prince Klemens von Metternich and other leaders of the repressive policies that followed the second fall of Napoleon in 1815, Jacobin is the term commonly applied to anyone with progressive tendencies, such as the emperor Alexander I of Russia.

== United States ==
Federalists often characterized Thomas Jefferson, who himself had intervened in the French Revolution, and his Democratic-Republican party as Jacobins. Early Federalist-leaning American newspapers during the French Revolution referred to the Democratic-Republican party as the "Jacobin Party". The most notable examples are the Gazette of the United States, published in Philadelphia, and the Delaware and Eastern-Shore Advertiser, published in Wilmington, during the elections of 1800.

In modern American politics, the term Jacobin is often used to describe extremists of any party who demand ideological purity.

Evidencing the antagonistic relationship between the press and insurgent Arizona conservative presidential candidate Barry Goldwater, The New York Times attacked Goldwater in their Bastille Day coverage of the 1964 Republican National Convention. The paper called his supporters "Cactus Jacobins", comparing their opposition to "establishment" Eastern Republicans (see Rockefeller Republican) and "sensation‐seeking columnists and commentators" as expressed by moderate former president Dwight Eisenhower to the execution of representatives of the Ancien Régime in the Reign of Terror. In contrast, L. Brent Bozell, Jr., has written in Goldwater's seminal The Conscience of a Conservative (1960) that "Throughout history, true Conservatism has been at war equally with autocrats and with 'democratic' Jacobins."

In 2010, an American left-wing socialist publication, Jacobin, was founded.

In the 27 May 2010 issue of The New York Review of Books, Columbia University political science and humanities professor and self-described liberal Mark Lilla analyzed three recent books dealing with American political party discontent in a review titled "The Tea Party Jacobins". On the other side, historian Victor Davis Hanson likened the rise and policies of leftists in the Democratic Party in 2019 to the Jacobins and Jacobinism.

== Influence ==
The political rhetoric and populist ideas espoused by the Jacobins would lead to the development of the modern leftist movements throughout the 19th and 20th century, with Jacobinism being the political foundation of almost all leftist schools of thought including anarchism, communism and socialism. The Paris Commune was seen as the revolutionary successor to the Jacobins. The undercurrent of radical and populist tendencies espoused and enacted by the Jacobins would create a complete cultural and societal shock within the traditional and conservative governments of Europe, leading to new political ideas of society emerging. Jacobin rhetoric would lead to increasing secularization and skepticism towards the governments of Europe throughout the 1800s. This complex and complete revolution in political, societal and cultural structure, caused in part by the Jacobins, had lasting impact throughout Europe, with such societal revolutions throughout the 1800s culminating in the Revolutions of 1848.

Jacobin populism and complete structural destruction of the old order led to an increasingly revolutionary spirit throughout Europe and such changes would contribute to new political foundations. It also informed new political ideologies. For instance in France, Georges Valois, founder of the first non-Italian fascist party Faisceau, claimed the roots of fascism stemmed from the Jacobin movement. While fascism bears similarities to Jacobinism particularly as a democratic nationalism fighting against an existing order, it is difficult to directly trace such lineage. Fascist groups themselves have held a variety of opinions mostly negative about the French Revolution, with the German National Socialists straightforwardly condemning it. Italian fascists called on fascism to surpass the French Revolution "with a new kind of democracy run by producers." Some French fascists were ambivalent or admired parts of Jacobinism and the Revolution. Valois on the other hand saw the Revolution as the start of a movement both socialist and nationalist, which fascists would complete.

Leftist organizations would take different elements from Jacobin's core foundation. Anarchists took influence from the Jacobins use of mass movements, direct democracy and left-wing populism which would influence the tactics of direct action. Some Marxists would take influence from the extreme protectionism of the Jacobins and the notion of the vanguard defender of the republic which would later evolve into vanguardism. The Jacobin philosophy of a complete dismantling of an old system, with completely radical and new structure, is historically seen as one of the most revolutionary and important movements throughout modern history.

== See also ==
- Polish Jacobins
- Jacobin (magazine)
- Memoirs Illustrating the History of Jacobinism
