= De la Loi sociale =

1841 book by Richard Lahautière

- Author: Richard Lahautière
- Publisher: Prévot
- Publication date: 1841
- Pages: 95

De la Loi sociale is a book written in 1841 by French socialist lawyer and journalist Richard Lahautière and dedicated to the philosopher Pierre Leroux.

== Overview ==
In the book, considered a chief work of Neo-Babouvism, Lahautière, himself more spiritually inclined than contemporaries Théodore Dézamy and Étienne Cabet (the latter of whom was a rival), asserted the goal of each human life should be to contribute to the forward march of communism, in communion with the venerable individuals who served well the progress of humanity in the past. Lahautière published the book without informing Cabet and a month later began printing his own political journal La Fraternité, Journal moral et politique, in direct competition with Cabet's Populaire.
