= Observations on Maximilien Robespierre =

1836 book by Philippe Buonarroti

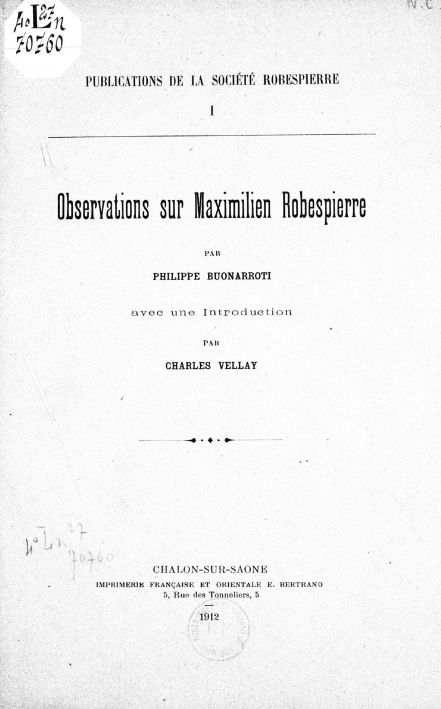
- Title page for Observations sur Maximilien Robespierre (1912 edition)
- Author: Philippe Buonarroti
- Original title: Observations sur Maximilien Robespierre
- Language: French
- Subject: Maximilien Robespierre
- Genre: History book
- Publication date: 1836
- Publication place: France

Observations on Maximilien Robespierre (Observations sur Maximilien Robespierre) is a book about French revolutionary leader Maximilien Robespierre written and published in 1836 by Italian writer and conspirator Philippe Buonarroti.

== Overview ==
The book was Buonarroti's final publication before his death and was remarkable in its time for its positive view of Robespierre's actions. Buonarroti went so far as to characterize Robespierre as next in a long line of heroic succession that included historical and legendary figures such as Moses, Pythagoras, Jesus Christ, and Mohammed. In Buonarroti's opinion, the incorruptible Robespierre fought a society which was "gangrenous" and singlehandedly laid the foundations of a people's republic. The work was intended by the aging Buonarroti to portray Robespierre as a model for socialist revolutionaries of the 1830s, a portrayal which greatly influenced young socialists and republicans who were acquainted with or inspired by Buonarroti, such as Albert Laponneraye. Laponneraye himself went on to befriend Charlotte de Robespierre and published several works of his own about the life of her brother. The first reprint of the book (which was initially anonymously published) was done in 1837 in Brussels, attached to Le Radical, and it has since been reprinted several times.
