= L'Intelligence =

French political journal

- Founder: Albert Laponneraye
- Categories: Politics
- First issue: 1837
- Final issue: 1839
- Country: Kingdom of France
- Based in: Paris
- Language: French

L'Intelligence was a French political journal created by republican socialist Albert Laponneraye in 1837. It is regarded by historians as the first communist periodical.

== History ==
During its brief existence, L'Intelligence was a popular periodical among not only the working class in major French cities like Paris and Lyon, but enjoyed substantial popularity in Switzerland as well. Utopian communist Étienne Cabet, with whom Laponneraye occasionally collaborated, referred to the publication as the 'standard-bearer of the egalitarian party, the communist party.' Richard Lahautière, friend and closest collaborator of Laponneraye, served as editor-in-chief of L'Intelligence. Marie Pierre Gabriel Étienne Choron, a lawyer who would later be elected Mayor of Soissons and a member of the Chamber of Deputies, also served in an editorial position and defended the publication in court.

Following the failed insurrection by the leaders of the Société des Saisons in 1839, Laponneraye ceased publishing the periodical.
