= Théodore Dézamy =

French socialist (1808–1850)

Alexandre Théodore Dézamy (4 March 1808 – 24 July 1850) was a French socialist, a representative of the neo-Babouvist tendency in early French communism, along with Albert Laponneraye, Richard Lahautière, Jacques Pillot and others. He was also an early associate of Louis-Auguste Blanqui. He and his colleagues formed a link between the extreme left wing of the French Revolution (Babeuf) and Marxism.

== Life ==
Alexandre Théodore Dézamy was born in Luçon (Vendée). He worked as a schoolteacher in Luçon before moving to Paris in the 1830s, where he became superintendent of a rooming house. Dézamy had already been developing ideas for a reorganisation of society on republican, communalistic and collectivist principles. He admired Gracchus Babeuf and Philippe Buonarroti and was influenced by the writing of the utopian communist Étienne Cabet. In Paris he joined Cabet's association and for a time worked as his secretary. He also contributed to Cabet's journal Le Populaire. Dézamy also made contact with several revolutionary secret societies. In particular, he joined the 'Society of the Season' of Auguste Blanqui and Armand Barbès, which carried out an unsuccessful insurrection in 1839. Blanqui and Barbès went to prison, where they became enemies. Dézamy was arrested but in 1840, he was free and collaborated with Jacques Pillot and others in organising the first communist banquet at Belleville. (Banquets were a common way of circumventing prohibitions against political demonstrations, with oppositional speeches disguised as toasts; in the 1840s, republican opponents of the Orléanist monarchy organised a nationwide campaign of banquets, but most were liberal in orientation.)

Dézamy subsequently broke with Cabet, whom he considered too opportunistic and reformist; instead of appealing to the bourgeoisie for sympathy with the proletariat, as Cabet was doing, Dézamy thought the workers should organise themselves and achieve their own liberation. Instead of hoping for reforms from a benevolent monarch, workers should support a revolution and the establishment of a unitary, centralised, egalitarian republic. Dézamy also deplored Cabet's religiosity, seeing the Church as an enemy of the people. He envisaged a republic of federated communes, each comprising about 10,000 people and combining industrial, agricultural and cultural work. Private property was to be abolished; work was to be assigned on the basis of ability; goods were to be distributed on the basis of need. Dézamy combined this social system with militant anti-clericalism, atheism and a materialist metaphysics derived from d'Holbach. Dézamy called his system 'unitary communism' and propagated it in his own journal, L'Égalitaire. In 1842 he published his best-known book, Code de la Communauté. In The Holy Family (1844), Karl Marx and Friedrich Engels wrote that 'the more scientific French Communists, Dézamy, Gay and others, developed the teaching of materialism as the teaching of real humanism and the logical basis of communism.'

In 1846, Dézamy founded his own association, the 'Egalitarian Communists'. They devoted themselves to revolutionary propaganda and education among workers, in preparation for a revolution and the establishment of a communitarian society. They also tried to combat the influence of religious and reformist communists like Cabet and Lamennais. When the Revolution of 1848 occurred, Dézamy joined the newly liberated Blanqui in founding the 'Central Republican Society', one of the most radical republican socialist clubs of the period. Dézamy also launched a new journal, Les Droits de l'Homme, with the slogan: 'Liberty, Equality, Fraternity, Association, Alliance of Peoples'. He also stood for elections to the National Assembly.

Louis Bonaparte became president in 1849 and the Second Republic took an increasingly conservative turn, with the Second Empire looming on the horizon. Dézamy returned to Luçon, where he died, aged 42. Besides Babeuf and Cabet, his ideas were also influenced by the eighteenth-century utopians Morelly and Mably and by Charles Fourier.

== Works ==
Dézamy's works are not generally available in English. His French works include:

- Question proposée par l'Académie des sciences morales et politiques : les nations avancent plus en connaissances, en lumières qu'en morale pratique... Paris, L.-E. Herhan et Bimont, 1839.
- Conséquences de l'embastillement et de la paix à tout prix, dépopulation de la capitale, trahison du pouvoir. Paris, 1840.
- M. Lamennais réfuté par lui-même, ou Examen critique du livre intitulé "Du passé et de l'avenir du peuple". Paris, 1841.
- Code de la communauté. Paris, Prévost, Rouannet, 1842.
- Calomnies et politique de M. Cabet. Réfutation par des faits et par sa biographie. Paris, Prévost, 1842.
- Dialogue sur la réforme électorale entre un communiste, un réformiste, un doctrinaire, un légitimiste. Paris, Prévot, 1842.
- Le Jésuitisme vaincu et anéanti par le socialisme, ou les Constitutions des Jésuites et leurs instructions secrètes en parallèle avec un projet d'organisation du travail. Paris, 1845.
- Examen critique des huit discours sur le catholicisme et la philosophie, prononcés à Notre-Dame, en décembre 1844 et en janvier 1845, par M. l'abbé Lacordaire; précédé d'une notice historique sur l'ordre des Dominicains et de la biographie de M. l'abbé Lacordaire, Paris, les libraires, 1845, 35 pages Organisation de la liberté et du bien-être universel... Paris, Guarin, 1846.

== Sources ==
- Billington, J.H., Fire in the minds of men: origins of the revolutionary faith. New Jersey, 2009.
- The great Soviet Encyclopedia. Moscow, 1979.
- Bravo, G.M., Les Socialistes avant Marx. Paris, Éditions Maspero, Petite collection Maspero, 1979.
- Tumminelli, R., Dézamy e l'utopia sociale. Milan, A. Giuffrè, 1984.
- Maillard, A., La communauté des Égaux. Le communisme néo-babouviste dans la France des années 1840. Paris, Kimé, 1999.
- Angenot, C., Les Grands récits militants du XIXe et XXe siècles. Religions de l'humanité et sciences de l'histoire. Paris, L'Harmattan, 2000.
- Garaudy, R., Les Sources françaises du Socialisme scientifique. Paris, 1948.
