= Jean-Jacques Pillot =

French revolutionary (1808–1877)

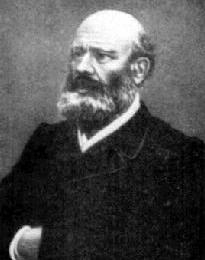
Jacques Pillot.

Jean-Jacques Pillot (9 August 1808 – 13 June 1877) was a French revolutionary and republican communist. He participated in the Revolution of 1848 and in the Paris Commune of 1871.

== Early life ==
Jean-Jacques Pillot was born in Vaux-Lavalette. He came from a pious family of humble means, entered the seminary at Marennes and became a priest. However, he deplored the role of the Catholic Church in propping up the Restoration régime and became increasingly doubtful about the existence of God. In the 1830s he underwent a crisis of conscience and prepared his exit from the Church by studying medicine. In 1837 he renounced his priesthood and became a doctor in Paris. He also proclaimed himself an atheist, a republican and a communist. Pillot increasingly devoted himself to political activism and journalism. From 1839 on contributed to and later edited the journal La Tribune du Peuple. He was an admirer of François-Noël 'Gracchus' Babeuf, the utopian communist revolutionary who had revolted against the Directory in 1796. Pillot called for a revolutionary coup d'état and the establishment of a republican régime that would collectivise all property and guarantee every citizen an equal share of the necessities of life. He is usually mentioned as a representative of Neo-Babouvism, along with writers like Philippe Buonarroti.

== Atheism ==
After leaving the priesthood, Pillot became a militant atheist. He saw belief in God as superstition, in the manner of the atheists of the Enlightenment, but he also accounted for this belief in a manner that resembles Ludwig Feuerbach's theory of religious alienation: because human beings are powerless, they project omnipotence onto an imaginary God; because they are poor and suffering, they project infinite luxury and happiness onto an imaginary heaven. Because people love an imaginary hereafter, they despise nature. (Pillot seems to have drawn an interesting link between religion, socio-political inequality and ecological depredation). To dispel religious superstition by means of science was an urgent necessity, because human beings must free their minds before they can free themselves socially. (By contrast, Marx saw religion as a consequence, not a cause, of social alienation and expected that the former would disappear with the latter. For Pillot, the abolition of religion was a condition of socialism; For Marx, socialism was a condition for the abolition of religion.

== Communist Activism and Revolution ==
Pillot was more of an activist than a theorist, however. In 1840 he was instrumental in organising the first explicitly communist reform banquet in Belleville. The banquet campaign was a common opposition tactic in France in the 1840s. Since expressly political meetings were illegal, meetings took the form of banquets, and political speeches were disguised as lengthy toasts. In 1841 he was sentenced to six months in prison for belonging to a communist secret society. After his release he resumed his conspiratorial activities and published a few pamphlets, including Histoire des Égaux ou Moyens d'établir l'Égalité absolue parmi les Hommes (1840), a popular history of Babeuf's 'Society of the Equals' with lessons for the present; Ni Châteaux, ni Chaumières, ou État de la Question sociale en 1840 (Neither Castles nor Cabins, 1840); and an account of his defence at his trial, La Communauté n'est plus une Utopie! Conséquence du Procès des Communistes (1841).

Pillot supported the February Revolution of 1848. He was unsuccessful in his efforts to get himself elected to the National Assembly, but sympathised with the collectivist theories of Constantin Pecqueur at the Luxembourg Commission of Labour. However, Pillot, who was associated with the extreme left wing of the Jacobin movement, soon grew disenchanted with the Second Republic. He was implicated in the workers' uprising of June, 1848, which was brutally put down. When Louis Bonaparte became President, Pillot fiercely opposed him, and after the Bonapartist coup d'état, Pillot was condemned to deportation to a penal colony and hard labour for life. He managed to escape to Brazil and eventually returned to France, where he worked as a producer of dentures, apparently unmolested.

== Syndicalism and the Paris Commune ==
In the 1860s Pillot supported the early French trade union movement and is therefore sometimes credited with being a pioneer of French syndicalism, although his role seems to have been minor. He joined the First International, whose French section was then dominated by followers of Proudhon. In 1870, with the siege of Paris during the Franco-Prussian War, Pillot resumed his revolutionary activities. He was a noted orator at the Club of the School of Medicine and was elected to the Council of the Commune as delegate from the first arrondissement. In the Paris Commune, Pillot allied himself with the Blanquist and Jacobin factions and voted for the creation of a Committee of Public Safety. He was later accused of being involved in burning the Tuileries palace. On 31 October 1870, he participated in an armed uprising against the Versailles government. He was captured and imprisoned after the uprising. In May 1872 he was finally tried and sentenced to hard labour for life, but the sentence was commuted to life in prison. Pillot died in the central prison at Melun on 13 June 1877.

== Significance ==
Jean-Jacques Pillot is often grouped with Théodore Dézamy (1805–1850), Richard Lahautière (1813–1882), Albert Laponneraye (1808–1849) and Jules Gay (1807–1887) as a representative of materialist communism in France and was cited as a forerunner by Karl Marx. Pillot was not only a metaphysical materialist but is also credited with a rudimentary class analysis of political conflict. Pillot thus represents one of the links from Babouvism and utopian Jacobin communism to Marxism.

== Sources ==
- The Great Soviet Encyclopedia. Moscow, 1979.
- Billington, J., Fire in the Minds of Men: The Origins of the Revolutionary Faith. New Jersey, 2009 [1980].
- Lowell, D.F., 'The French Revolution and the Origins of Socialism: The Case of Early French Socialism.' French History (1992) 6 (2), pp. 185–205.
- Garaudy, R., Les Dources françaises du Socialisme scientifique. Paris, 1948.
- fr:Jean-Jacques Pillot
