= Histoire complète de la Révolution, depuis 1789 jusqu'en 1814 =

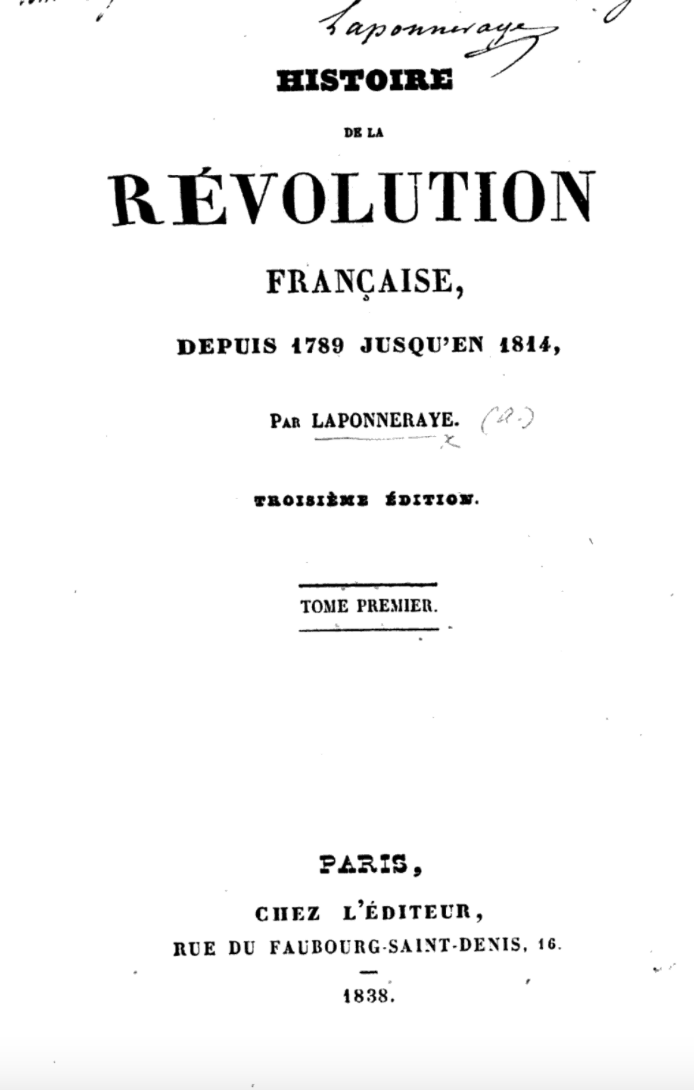
- Title page
- Author: Albert Laponneraye
- Language: French
- Subject: French Revolution
- Genre: History book
- Publication date: 1838
- Publication place: France
- Pages: 476

Histoire complète de la Révolution, depuis 1789 jusqu'en 1814 (Complete History of the Revolution, from 1789 until 1814) is a history book about the French Revolution written in 1838 by French journalist and historian Albert Laponneraye.

== Overview ==
The Complete History of the Revolution was the culmination of years of research conducted by Laponneraye, a socialist of the Neo-Babouvist tendency who considered the French Revolution to be a triumph of the people that should serve as a foundation for what he considered a necessary proletarian revolution, as he deemed the original revolution incomplete. Laponneraye's research into the French Revolution produced several important and popular works, of which the Complete History of the Revolution was no exception. It sold very well and was reissued several times during the period of 1838 to 1840.

== See also ==
- The French Revolution: A History
- The Old Regime and the Revolution
