= La Fraternité, Journal moral et politique =

Socialist political journal

- Editor: Richard Lahautière
- Categories: Politics
- First issue: May 1841
- Final issue: March 1843
- Country: Kingdom of France
- Based in: Paris
- Language: French

La Fraternité, Journal moral et politique (English: The Brotherhood, Moral and Political Journal) was a socialist political journal founded in Paris in May 1841 by journalist Richard Lahautière.

== History ==
It was for a brief time the primary publication of the pre-Marxist Neo-Babouvist movement. The movement was influenced by the revolutionary activities of Gracchus Babeuf and the writings of Philippe Buonarroti and supported radical Jacobin republicanism and economic collectivism. Unique among socialist publications of the early 1840s, La Fraternité was well informed about the burgeoning communist movement in the German states.

Lahautière retired as editor-in-chief in October 1841 and was replaced by a librarian named Pinault. The shoemaker and communist activist André Marie Savary was a frequent contributor to the journal.
