= Richard Lahautière =

French writer (1813–1882)

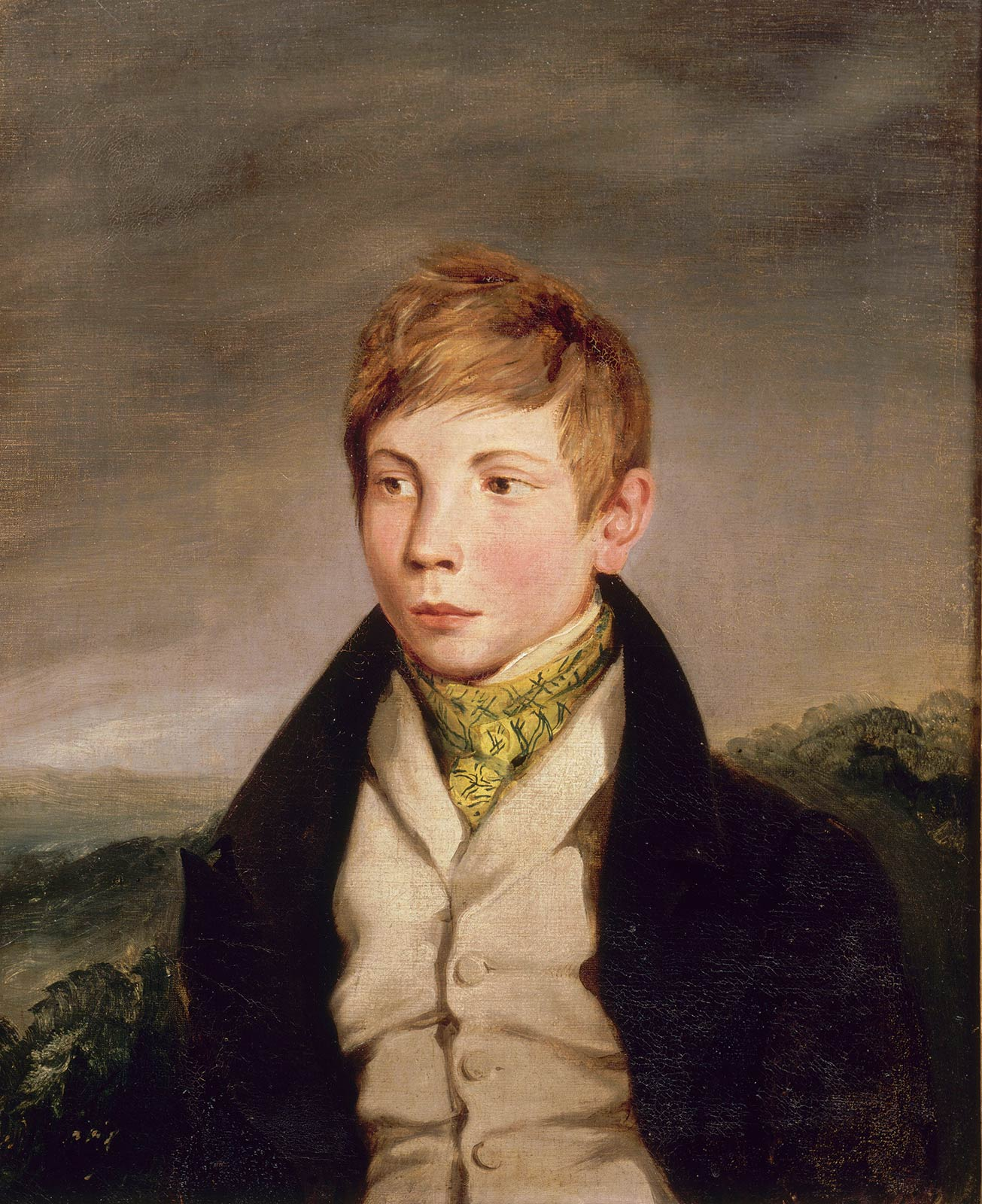
- Portrait by Eugène Delacroix (1828)
- Born: Auguste-Richard de la Hautière; May 21, 1813; Paris, French Empire
- Died: June 27, 1882 (aged 69); Vendôme, French Republic
- Occupations: Journalist, poet, lawyer
- Writing career
- Notable works: De la Loi sociale Petit catéchisme de la réforme sociale

Auguste-Richard Lahautière (May 21, 1813 – June 27, 1882) (also known as Richard de la Hautière) was a French socialist, journalist, poet and lawyer. He is commonly grouped with Théodore Dézamy, Albert Laponneraye, Jean-Jacques Pillot and others as belonging to the Neo-Babouvist tendency in French nineteenth-century socialism, which formed a link from the utopian communism of Gracchus Babeuf to Marxism. He contributed to and was the editor of several important socialist publications prior to the Revolutions of 1848.

== Life ==
Auguste Richard de la Hautière, who dropped his aristocratic-sounding 'de' and went by 'Richard Lahautière', was born in Paris on 21 May 1813. He was educated at the Institution Saint-Victor (now the Lycée Chaptal). In 1828 he won second prize in Latin composition and on that occasion had his portrait painted by the famous Eugène Delacroix. In 1835 he obtained a law degree and was called to the bar in Paris, but he was by then already more interested in political journalism.

Lahautière had become attracted to socialist ideas as a young man. At first he was interested in Saint-Simonism. He greatly admired Pierre Leroux, a former Saint-Simonian who became a noted socialist writer in the 1830s. Lahautiére was also attracted to the communist republicanism of Philippe Buonarroti and other followers of Babeuf. In the 1830s, Lahautière contributed to the journal L'Intelligence and to Albert Laponneraye's Égalité, both devoted to the propagation of socialist, communist and republican ideas. In 1841, he founded his own paper, La Fraternité, Journal moral et politique. In 1840 he collaborated with the famous utopian communist Étienne Cabet in writing the pamphlet Boulets Rouges. His best-known work was probably De la Loi sociale (1841), dedicated to Pierre Leroux.

Lahautière sympathized with the Revolution of 1848 but played no significant role in it. After the coup d'état of Louis Bonaparte in December 1851, Lahautière withdrew from politics and moved to Blois, where he practised law and published poetry. He died on 27 June 1882 at Vendôme. In his writings Lahautière combined republicanism and communism with a kind of holistic metaphysical materialism and a rudimentary class analysis of history.

== Works ==
Richard Lahautière's writings are not generally available in English. A selection of his French works includes:

Études et souvenirs. Poésies. Paris, Rouanet, 1840.

Petit catéchisme de la réforme sociale. Senlis, 1839.

Réponse Philosophique à un Article sur le Babouvisme, publié par M. Thoré, dans le Journal du peuple., Paris, 1840.

Boulets rouges. (with Étienne Cabet), Paris, Fiquet, 1840.

De la Loi sociale, Paris, 1841.

Les Déjeuners de Pierre. Dialogues. Paris, 1841.

Causerie sur Ronsard Vendôme, 1863.

Élégies de Tibulle. Vendôme, 1879.

Rimes détachées. Vendôme, 1881.

Première jeunesse, Illusions. - Dix ans après, Désillusions. Vendôme, 1882.

== Sources and References ==
Billington, J.H., Fire in the Minds of Men: Origins of the Revolutionary Faith. New York, 1980.

Bravo, G.M., Les Socialistes avant Marx. Two volumes. Paris, 1970.

Hecht, J., 'French Utopian Socialists and the Population Question: "Seeking the Future City".' Population and Development Review, vol. 14, 1988, p. 49–73.

Maitron, J., and C. Pennetier (ed's), Dictionnaire Biographique du Mouvement Ouvrier français. Paris, 1997.

Garaudy, R., Les Sources françaises du Socialisme scientifique. Paris, 1948.
