= Neo-Babouvism =

19th century trend in French political theory

Neo-Babouvism is a revolutionary socialist current in French political theory and political action in the 19th century. It hearkened back to the May 1796 Conspiracy of the Equals of Gracchus Babeuf and his associates, who tried to overthrow the Directory in May 1796 during the French Revolution. After Babeuf's execution (1797), his programme of radical Jacobin republicanism and economic collectivism (Babeufism or Babeuvism or Babouvism, French: babouvisme) was propagated by Philippe Buonarroti, who had been associated with the Conspiracy of the Equals but had survived. Buonarroti's writings influenced many French revolutionaries in the 1830s and 1840s, among them Théodore Dézamy, Richard Lahautière, Albert Laponneraye and Jean-Jacques Pillot.

The neo-Babouvists represented the extreme left-wing of the neo-Jacobin republican movement. Many of them participated in the revolutionary events of the 19th century such as the Revolution of 1848 and the Paris Commune of 1871. They provided a link or a contrast between the utopian socialism of the French Revolution and Marxism.

Louis-Auguste Blanqui (1805-1881) is sometimes grouped with the followers of Babeuf. Babouvists and Blanquists were often allies - such as in the Paris Commune. However, Blanqui regarded himself as a political descendant of Jacques Hébert (1757-1794) and his followers, not of Babeuf. Blanqui also had no organisational ties to the societies of the Babouvists and lacked the clear commitment to economic communism of the Babouvists. The writings of Buonarroti and through them the doctrines of Babeuf also had a considerable influence on some socialists, such as those within the British Chartist movement of 1838-1858, notably on James Bronterre O'Brien (1804-1864).

Neo-Babouvism largely disappeared in the second half of the 19th century, although an echo of it may be found in the small non-Marxist Revolutionary Communist Alliance that existed briefly in the 1890s.
