= Constantin Pecqueur =

French economist, socialist theoretician and politician (1801–1887)

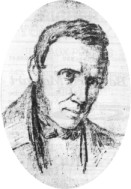
Constantin Pecqueur.

Charles Constantin Pecqueur (26 October 1801 – 17 December 1887) was a French economist, socialist theoretician and politician. He participated in the Revolution of 1848 and influenced Karl Marx.

== Life and Thought ==
Charles Constantin Pecqueur was born into a wealthy upper-middle-class family in the Department du Nord; his town of birth is variously given as Arleux or Douai. He studied engineering and mathematics. He worked for a time as a geometer. In the 1820s, he entered the Military Teaching Hospital in Lille, where he completed a treatise on education and became interested in utopian socialist theories. In 1830, he moved to Paris. At first he joined the followers of Saint-Simon. He contributed to Le Globe and other Saint-Simonian papers, but left the Saint-Simonian school in 1832, dissatisfied with the religious direction in which Prosper Enfantin was taking it. Until 1836, he belonged to the school of Fourier and joined a phalanstère or Fourierist community. He wrote a biography of Fourier in 1835 and contributed to various Fourierist journals. In 1836, he left the Fourierists, publishing a critique of their system, and developed his own theories. He remained close, however, to some of his friends from the Saint-Simonian and Fourierist schools, such as Pierre Leroux and Victor Considerant.

In contrast to these theorists, Pecqueur was one of the earliest French socialists to advocate collective ownership of the means of production, distribution and exchange. He is sometimes called the 'father of French collectivist socialism.' In the 1830s, Pecqueur made his name as a highly respected socialist economist. His writings included Intérêt du commerce et de l'industrie (1836), Améliorations matérielles (1839), La réforme électorale (1840), Théories nouvelles d'économie sociale et politique (1842), De la paix, de son principe et de sa réalisation (1842), Des armées dans leurs rapports avec l'industrie (1842) and La République de Dieu (1844).

Among other works, particular notice accrued to his two-volume opus Economie sociale des intérêts du commerce, de l'industrie, de l'agriculture et de la civilisation en général, sous l'influence de l'application de la vapeur (1839). In this work, Pecqueur tried to show that changes in material conditions, such as the introduction of steam power, produce changes in intellectual development. The French Academy of Moral and Political Sciences awarded him a prize. Karl Marx also praised Pecqueur's materialist method. Marx later frequently cited Pecqueur as an authority in Capital and other economic writings. In contrast to many of his utopian socialist contemporaries, and again anticipating Marx' view, Pecqueur did not see the development of industrial production as predominantly negative. He welcomed the greater productive capacity of industry but thought that capitalist relations of ownership prevented the full productive potential of industrial technology from being realised. Industry should therefore be nationalised and organised for the common benefit. (However, Pecqueur's materialism was confined to economics, sociology and historical analysis. Metaphysically he was not a materialist but shared the deistic religiosity of many French republicans.)

In 1839, Pecqueur was commissioned by the French government to make a study of the Belgian railway system, which was more advanced than that of France. He recommended government investment in railway construction.

In 1844, Pecqueur became a regular contributor to the leading democratic newspaper, La Réforme, edited by the left-wing republican Alexandre Ledru-Rollin. This gave him a wider platform for his ideas and put him in contact with other major republican socialist figures of the period, including the economist Louis Blanc. In 1848, Pecqueur supported the February Revolution. When Blanc became Minister of Labour in the new Provisional Government of the Second Republic, he set up the Luxembourg Commission on the question of 'the organisation of labour' and appointed Pecqueur to its panel. Among his colleagues at the Luxembourg Commission were the orthodox liberal economist Pierre Le Play and the Fourierist socialist Victor Considerant. Pecqueur and Considerant collaborated quite closely and tried unsuccessfully to introduce several reforms, such as collective bargaining and government funding for agricultural colonies, social housing and co-operative workshops. Pecqueur was also nominated to the position of assistant director of the Bibliothèque Nationale. Under the nom de plume 'Greppo', he published a popular book called Catéchisme social (1848) to popularise his ideas. He also maintained contact with republican communists like Jean-Jacques Pillot.

In 1848–1849, Pecqueur edited the journal Le Salut du People he had founded, devoted to social science and socialist politics. In its pages he carried on a polemic against Pierre-Joseph Proudhon, the famous anarchist social theorist and economist. Proudhon had sharply criticised the work of the Luxembourg Commission and Louis Blanc's role in the bourgeois Provisional Government. In turn, Pecqueur accused Proudhon of plagiarising Fourier's ideas; in particular, he charged that Proudhon's project of a 'People's Bank' of mutual exchange was an idea taken from Fourier.

Pecqueur was also notable for his efforts on behalf of international understanding. At a time when French socialism and republicanism were commonly associated with nationalism, Pecqueur was a professed internationalist who believed that the workers of different countries had common interests, and that conflicts between nations should be solved not by war but by means of international organs of mediation. He proposed an international federation of all nations, anticipating the idea of a United Nations. He also championed the idea of a European Parliament. He was involved in various pacifist associations in the 1870s and 1880s. Other notable proposals of his included the idea of public transit.

Pecqueur remained a member of the National Assembly until 1852, but after the coup d'état of Louis Bonaparte he largely withdrew from political activity. In the 1860s, he provided advice to Benoît Malon and the nascent French trade union movement. He died in Taverny in 1887. His extant papers, letters and manuscripts are kept at the International Institute of Social History in Amsterdam. A small place and a metro station in Paris were named after him.

== Quote on Pecqueur ==
"Pecqueur's originality as a theorist rests on his understanding of the consequences inherent in the industrial revolution. In his writings he developed a rudimentary sociology of class and a general theory of historical development which formed a link between Saint-Simonism and Marxism."—George Lichtheim.

== Sources ==
- Lichtheim, G., The Origins of Socialism. London, 1969.
- Zouaoui, A., Socialisme et Internationalisme: Constantin Pecqueur. Geneva, 1964.
