= Barbe-Therese Marchand =

French journalist

Barbe-Therese Marchand, known as Madame Marchand (1745 -fl. 1792), was a French journalist and editor. She was the director and chief editor of the Affiches d'Artois of Arras in 1789–1792. She used her newspaper in opposition to the Jacobin Party and was subsequently exiled and put on the emigree list after a conflict with the local Jacobins.

== Life and career ==
Marchand became editor of the Affiches d'Artois (1788-1792) 22 December 1789. The paper had been founded by Etienne-Géry Lenglet and was initially printed by the printer Madame Cecile Nicolas, but in 1790 Marchand became its printer as well. She published the newspaper in collaboration with lawyer Denis and the member of the deputies Duquesnoy; all three of them were member of the Arras academy (L'Académie d'Arras).

Her newspaper became known for its opposition against the Jacobins, and via her paper she expressed sympathy for the priests who refused to swear an oath to the constitution and the exiled emigrée aristocrats and polemized against the local Arras Jacobine organ Société des Amis de la Constitution d'Arras, opinions that caused a conflict between with Maximilien Robespierre and Charlotte Robespierre, which was noted in the memoirs of Charlotte Robespierre, and Marchand published caricatures of them in her paper. She discontinued her paper and left the country in 1792 in fear of political persecution. She is reported to have emigrated to Tournai, and was placed on the list of illegal emigrees.
