= Marxist–Leninist Communist Organization – Proletarian Way =

Marxist–Leninist Communist Organization – Proletarian Way Organisation communiste marxiste-léniniste – Voie prolétarienne
- Abbreviation: OCML – VP
- Founded: September 1976
- Headquarters: BP122; 93403 Saint-Ouen
- Ideology: Communism; Marxism–Leninism; Maoism
- Political position: Far-left
- International affiliation: ICMLPO (defunct)

Website
- ocml-vp.org

The Marxist–Leninist Communist Organization – Proletarian Way (French: Organisation communiste marxiste-léniniste – Voie prolétarienne or OCML-VP) is a French Maoist organization formed in 1976, whose political practice is Marxist-Leninist and Maoist.

== Origins ==
Founded in September 1976, MLCO Proletarian Way traces its roots from the student and workers' movement of May 1968. It absorbed militants from various previously disbanded Marxist–Leninist organisations, such as Gauche prolétarienne.

== Activities ==
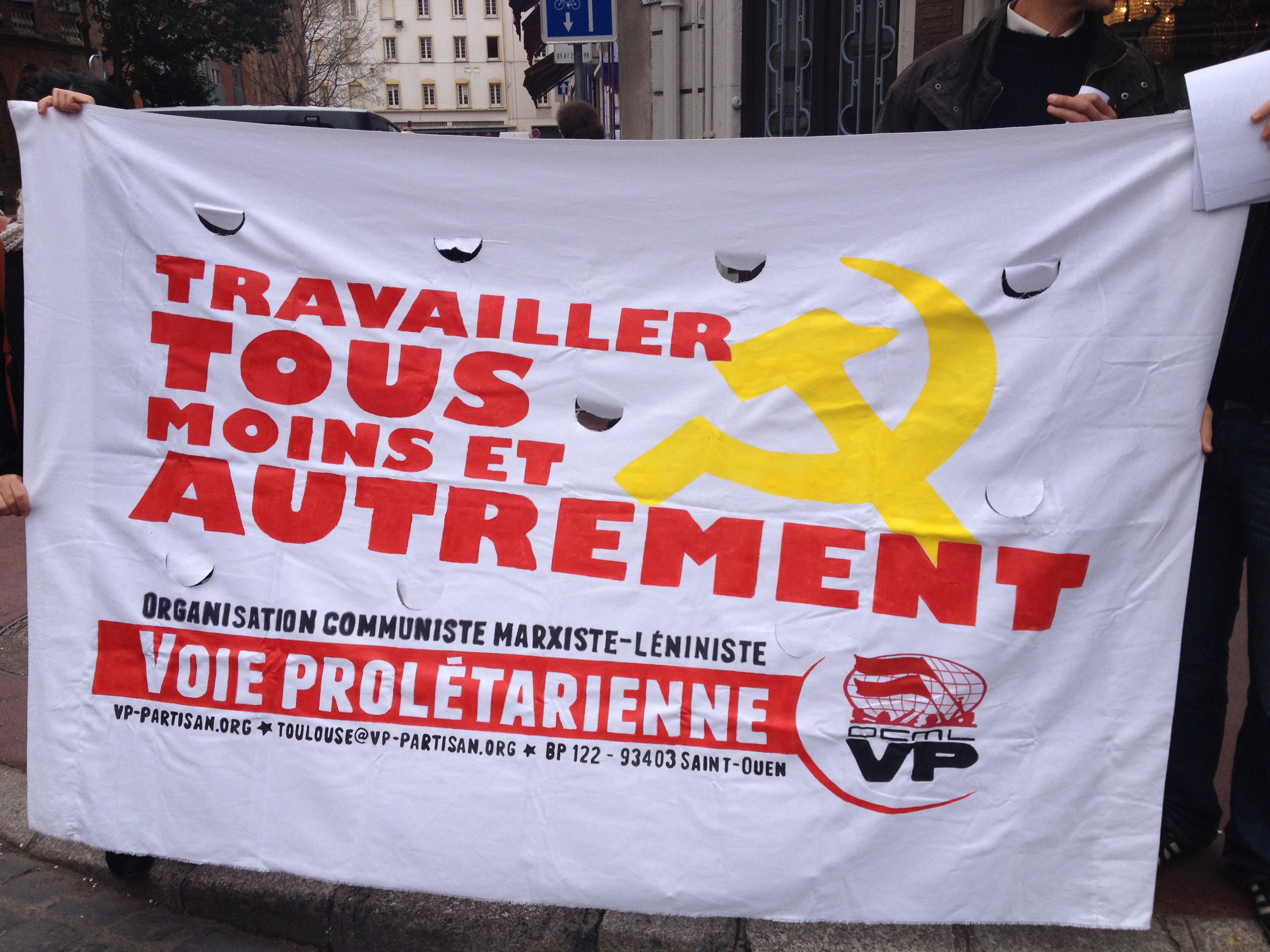
An OCML-Voie Prolétarienne banner at a protest.

Proletarian Way states that it is “active in all the struggles of the working class and the proletariat, in factories and popular neighborhoods”. For example, the employment, support for immigrants, against sexism and homophobia etc.

In trade unions, particularly in General Confederation of Labour, it participates in the development of red fraction with the blog "Où va la CGT?".

Proletarian Way also organized various internationalists events like Revolutionary Association of the Women of Afghanistan tours in France.

== Elections ==
MLCO Proletarian Way does not participate in the elections and called for abstention in presidential election in 2012.

== International ==
The organization takes part in the International Conference of Marxist–Leninist Parties and Organizations (International Newsletter). Proletarian Way also support the people war in India and Philippines.

== Publications ==
Proletarian Way publish the monthly paper Partisan. It publishes brochures on various topics.
