= Charlotte de Robespierre =

French writer and revolutionary (1760–1834)

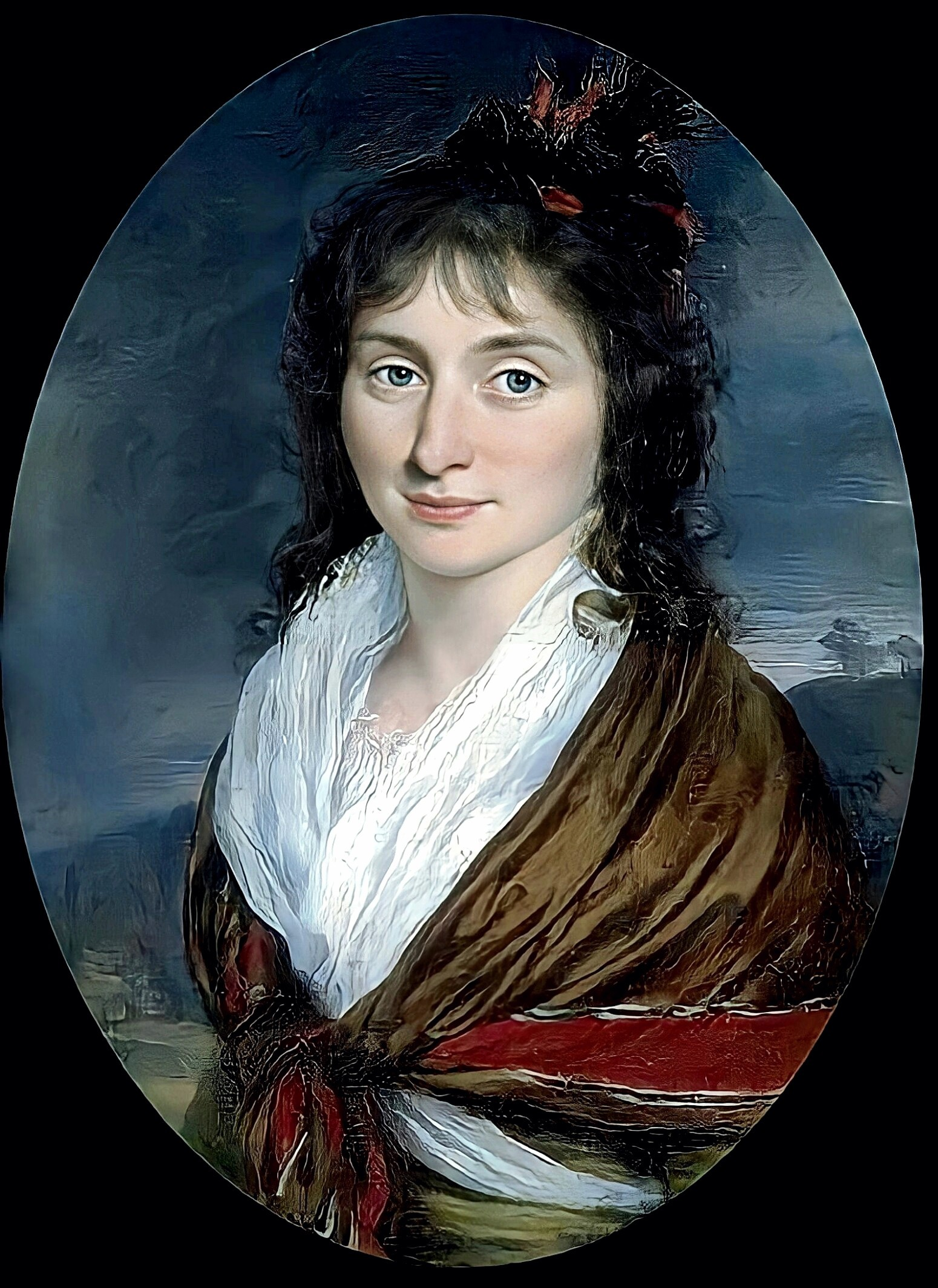
Charlotte Robespierre

Marie Marguerite Charlotte de Robespierre (French pronunciation: [ʃaʁlɔt d(ə) ʁɔbɛspjɛʁ]; 5 February 1760 – 1 August 1834) was a French writer and revolutionary. A Jacobin during the French Revolution, she is best known for the memoirs she dictated about the lives of her brothers, Maximilien Robespierre and Augustin Robespierre. She never married, and was described as respectable and entirely devoted to her brothers, to whom she was fiercely loyal.

== Life ==
Born in Arras, she was the second child of François de Robespierre and Jacqueline Marguerite Carrault, the younger sister of Maximilien, and the elder sister of Henriette and Augustin Robespierre.

After the death of her mother, she and Henriette were both sent to live with their paternal aunts when her father left their home. They were given the typical education for middle- and upper-class daughters in pre-Revolutionary France, and were educated in a convent school in Tournai. Despite now living in separate homes and attending different schools, Charlotte still saw her siblings every Sunday, maintaining a close relationship with them. The death of her younger sister, Henriette, was quite hard for all three of them, especially Maximilien. In 1781, she left the convent school to live with her two brothers in Arras. In 1791, she led a campaign against Barbe-Therese Marchand's Affiches d'Artois, an anti-Jacobin newspaper. For some time, Charlotte de Robespierre was supposed to be betrothed to Joseph Fouché, but he moved to Nantes where he married in September 1792.

In 1789 her brother Maximilien settled in Paris, and Charlotte and Augustin followed in September 1792. She lived with Augustin at the Duplays in the front house but moved to 5 Rue Saint-Florentin because of tensions with Madame Duplay. She engaged in the political circles of revolutionary Paris. According to some accounts, Maximilien was engaged to Duplay's eldest daughter Éléonore, but Charlotte vigorously denied this; also their brother Augustin refused to marry her.

According to Charlotte, her brother stopped talking to his former friend, mayor Pétion de Villeneuve, accused of conspicuous consumption by Desmoulins, and finally rallied to Brissot.

In July 1793, after a Federalist revolt broke out in Alpes-Maritimes, Marseille and Nice, she accompanied Augustin (and Jean-François Ricard) as part of a group to suppress the revolt. When Augustin returned on 19 December he decided not to move in with Charlotte; they were no longer on speaking terms. Despite their arguments with each other, both siblings remained on good terms with their eldest brother, with Charlotte frequently visiting Maximilien and delivering him homemade food such as jams. When her brothers were arrested in 1794, she unsuccessfully petitioned for permission to visit them. She was herself arrested and interrogated, but ultimately released.

After the fall of her brother she lived under very limited circumstances, and was taken care of by friends. In 1803, she was given a modest pension by Napoleon. Later, she denounced a forged memoir of Maximilien that was published in 1830; according to her, Maximilien never presided over the insurrectionary commune. The death of his mother is, thanks to Charlotte's memoirs, believed to have had a major effect on the young Robespierre. She met Albert Laponneraye, who would subsequently write her memoirs after her dictation, focusing heavily on the lives of her brothers. She died in Paris in 1834.

== Sources ==
- Hampson, Norman (1974). The Life and Opinions of Maximilien Robespierre. Duckworth. ISBN 978-0-7156-0741-1.
- Gabriel Pioro et Pierre Labracherie, «Charlotte Robespierre, ihren Memoiren und ihre Freunde», dans Maximilien Robespierre, Berlin, éditions Markov, 1958.
- Robespierre, Charlotte de (2006) [1834]. Mémoires (in French). Preface by Jean-Clément Martin, introduction by Albert Laponneraye. Nouveau Monde Éditions.
