= Armand Barbès =

French Republican revolutionary (1809–1870)

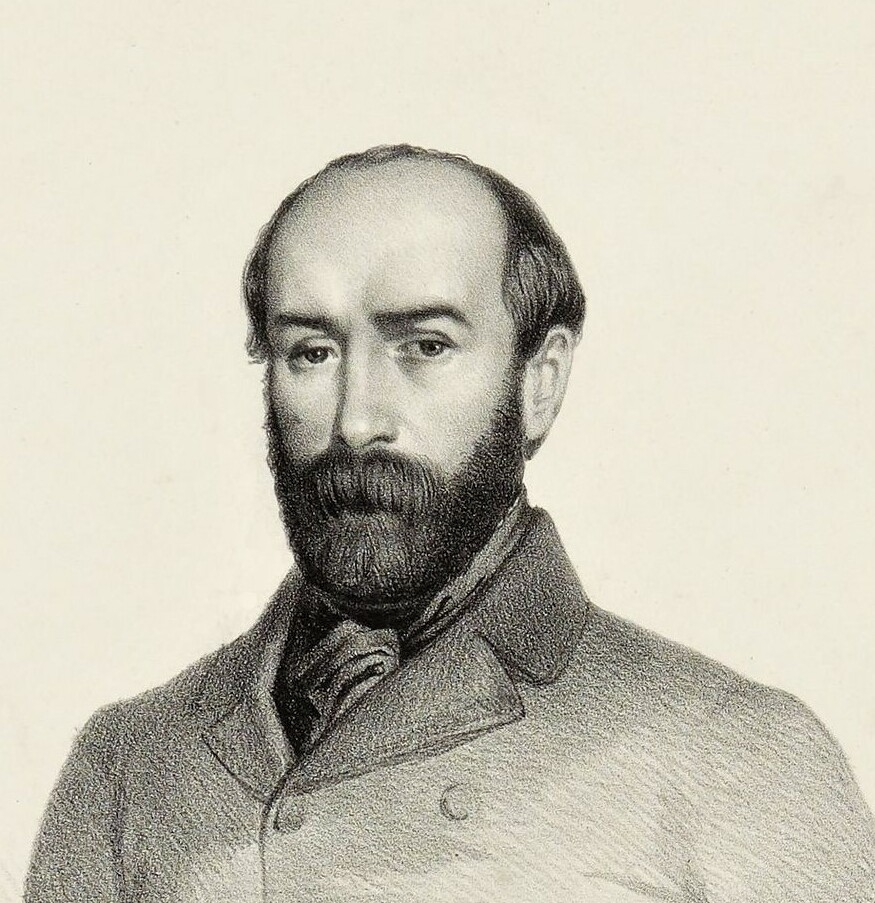
- Born: 18 September 1809
- Died: 26 June 1870 (aged 60)
- Known for: French Republican revolutionary; Opponent of the July monarchy

Armand Barbès (18 September 1809 – 26 June 1870) was a French Republican revolutionary and an opponent of the July Monarchy (1830–1848).

His life is most widely remembered for two dates:

- 12 May 1839, the day of the uprising the Republicans tried to overthrow the king, Louis Philippe. His ill-considered actions on this day led to a sentence of life imprisonment; he was, however, released by the revolution of 1848; and
- 15 May 1848, the day when demonstrators invaded the Assemblée Nationale, where Barbès had been serving as a deputy for about three weeks. The demonstrators' apparent aim was to urge the government to exercise whatever influence it could to support Poland's liberation. Things got out of hand, however, and Barbès got caught up in what was perceived as a coup d'état through the imposition of a provisional government.

Barbès was again imprisoned, but he was pardoned by Napoleon III in 1854. He fled into exile in the Netherlands, where he died on 26 June 1870, only weeks before the end of the Second Empire in France.

He was nicknamed the Bayard of Democracy, presumably in honor of the chevalier Pierre Terrail, seigneur de Bayard (1476–1524). He was called the "scourge of the establishment" by Karl Marx.

== Youth ==
Barbès was born into a middle-class family in Pointe-à-Pitre, Guadeloupe. His father, an army surgeon from Carcassonne in the département of Aude, was born in Capendu, also in Aude. He was a veteran of Napoleon's Egyptian campaign. Posted to Guadeloupe in 1801, he remained there until the fall of the First Empire in 1814.

In 1828, he moved to Paris, joined the Republican party, and started to study Law. His parents died that year, leaving him a hefty inheritance. He was chosen to lead the local battalion of the National Guard during the 1830 revolution. The elder Barbès financed the battalion out of his own pocket.

In 1834, his membership in a Jacobin-leaning organization, the Société des Droits de l'Homme (Society for the Rights of Man), led to his first arrest. Released in early 1835, he served as a lawyer for 164 defendants indicted for republican insurgency during 1834, and, in July 1835, he assisted twenty-eight of them to escape from Sainte-Pelagie prison in Paris, an institution reserved for political troublemakers.

In 1834, the Society for the Rights of Man, at about the time of Barbès's arrest, was dismantled by the police. He responded by founding the short-lived Society of Avengers, which was followed, the next year, by the League of Families, the organization for which Barbès composed the oath of membership, a must for all aspiring conspirators. This began his long and tumultuous "collaboration" with Louis Auguste Blanqui. On 10 March 1836, Barbès and Blanqui were arrested by the police while loading ammunition in the apartment they shared in Paris. Barbès, sentenced to one-year imprisonment, was pardoned in 1837, and he spent several months, after his pardon, with his family in Carcassonne. There, he devised plans for a new secret society and wrote the brochure that will remain his only contribution to revolutionary literature, "A Few Words to Those who Sympathize with Workers without Work".

When he returned to Paris in 1838, he joined with Blanqui and Martin Bernard (politician) to form yet another republican secret society, the very proletarian Society of Seasons.

== The Society of Seasons ==
The Society of Seasons was organized on the principle of a hierarchy of cells. A "week" was a group of six men and a leader. Four "weeks" made a "month" of twenty-eight "days" (actually, twenty-eight initiates, plus a leader.) Three months constituted a "season", and four "seasons" made a "year". At its height, the Society comprised more than three "years".

The founding of the Society of Seasons led directly to the Barbès-led insurrection of 12 May 1839. At this time, Barbès, Blanqui, and Martin were three Republicans cut from the same cloth. They were of the same generation, with the same youthful commitment to revolutionary struggle, and shared a common experience of oppression, trials, and imprisonment. Then, their paths diverged.

== The 1839 coup ==
On 12 May 1839, the Society of Seasons and its approximately nine hundred members felt strong enough to attempt a coup d'état in Paris. Four hundred insurgents managed to seize the National Assembly, the city hall, and the Palace of Justice, but they were unable to maintain their grip for more than a few hours because of a lack of numbers and weapons. Following the failure of this insurrection, Barbès was sentenced to death, but his sentence was commuted to 'life imprisonment' mainly due to the intervention of Victor Hugo. Also, these events led to a divorce between Barbès and Blanqui, which became a severe impediment to the extreme left during the revolution of 1848 and later in the century.

Barbès was sent to Mont-Saint-Michel on 17 July 1839 with three other convicts, including Martin Bernard, who left a detailed account of their time in prison. (Blanqui and five other insurgents joined them on 6 February 1840.)

Upon their arrival, the inmates fought against the rigors of solitary confinement by maintaining a continuous din from the windows, up the chimneys, and through the walls. After repeated trials, Barbès, Bernard, and an old comrade, Delsade, managed to open the doors of their cells to meet. Discovered in April 1841, they were punished by imprisonment in the "loges" section of the prison, in view of the warder on duty. The prison administration then equipped their cells with double gates to prevent them from approaching the cross in what, after all, had been an abbey before its conversion to a high-security prison at the time of the French Revolution.

On the nights of 10 and 11 February 1842, Barbès, Blanqui, and others attempted to escape in fog using a rope made of knotted sheets. Barbès was the first over the wall, but he was injured in the fall, which doomed the escape attempt. All of them were confined again in their cells. Shortly after that, Barbès contracted what he called consumption (tuberculosis), probably, in fact, persistent bronchitis brought on by the cold and damp of Mont-Saint-Michel.

== Barbès and Blanqui ==
Blanqui, the prime mover of the 1839 coup, seems to have believed that Barbès, who had been away from revolutionary activities for a short while, lacked resolve, that he was exhausted from repeated discouragements, and that this attitude in Barbès disheartened his fellow insurgents, leading to a failure of the coup.

When he was released from prison in 1848, Barbès seemed to have regained his enthusiasm, and he rallied the revolutionary left in a more moderate and pragmatic direction to oppose Blanqui. Guided by Alphonse de Lamartine, he formed the Club of the Revolution to counteract Blanqui's Central Insurrection Society, an organization prudently renamed the Central Republican Society.

Owing to his previous brief military experience in the Aude, Barbès was appointed colonel of the National Guard of the Twelfth District, and, ironically, he led his troops, on 16 April 1848, against a workers' demonstration led by Louis Blanc and Blanqui. Workers had demanded a more active social program and especially the postponement of the imminent elections to the constituent National Assembly. The protesters foresaw that the government had no time to "educate" the provincials, so the new Assembly would be dominated by Parisian conservatives and reactionaries.

A month earlier, in March 1848, the hostility between Barbès and Blanqui had erupted with the publication in the mainstream press of the so-called document Taschereau, said to be derived from police records. This document purportedly proved that Blanqui had betrayed his fellow conspirators during the 1839 coup. A goodly number of historians now consider it highly likely that this document was "a false broadcast, in the form of leaks by the government" to destabilize and undermine. If so, it worked. Barbès apparently believed in the authenticity of this document, and this caused "terrible divisions" among those of the left, divisions still present at the end of the century.

The two men, who had become distrustful of one another, ended up hating each other with the same passion that had fueled their early revolutionary collaboration. Nonetheless, both are major figures in the Republican pantheon, where they both enjoy a reputation as uncompromising revolutionaries, never diminished by the inevitable compromises necessitated by the exercise of power. Barbès, perhaps more thoughtful than his colleague, was fascinated by Blanqui, who was romantic, brave, but prone to impulses. Beyond this fascination, Barbès hoped to channel the might of the volcanic Blanqui, but, he was, many suppose, secretly afraid of Blanqui's capacity for unreason and violence.

== The treason of Barbès ==
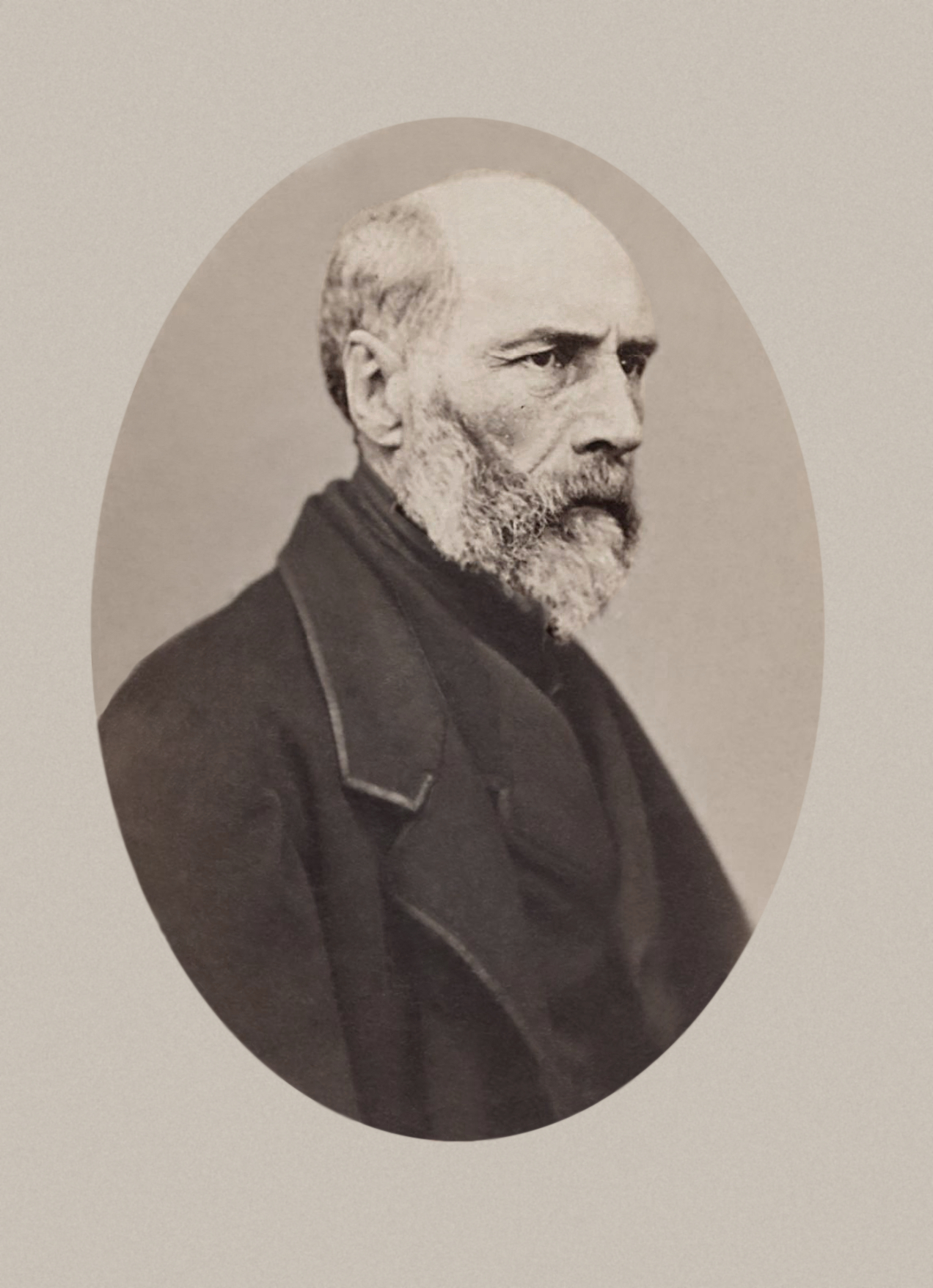
Photograph of Armand Barbès in Holland, 1869

Released from prison in 1848, Barbès seemed to his contemporaries to be obsessed with thwarting Blanqui. Elected to the Constituent Assembly of 23 April 1848, Barbès, at the extreme left of the chamber, represented his native department of Aude. His parliamentary career was brief, however, since, on 15 May, demonstrators invaded the Assembly, under the pretext of presenting a petition urging the government to become more involved in the liberation of Poland. Barbès, initially opposed the demonstration, and he tried to disperse the crowd, but he seemed to lose his head when he saw Auguste Blanqui in the assembly chamber.

In an effort to seize the demonstration as a tool to bludgeon his enemy, he sparked a riot in front of the city hall, where a new, and more radical, republic was proclaimed. The insurgency was 'deflated' by itself when National Guard arrived to stop Barbès. He was sentenced to life imprisonment in April 1849 by the High Court of Justice, after he was found guilty of two major charges, an attack that aimed to overthrow the government, and incitement to civil war.

Later, Karl Marx wrote in Class Struggles in France: "On 12 May [1848, the proletariat] sought unsuccessfully to regain its revolutionary influence, but only managed to deliver to the bourgeoisie's jailers their most energetic leaders." Modern historians have been even less kind: George Duveau, the historian, described the event as a "tragic and absurd farce which had, from the beginning, no prospect of success."

Sentenced to life imprisonment in 1849, Barbès was released by Napoleon III in 1854. However, he never returned to France. He had spent all but a few weeks of the previous fifteen years in confinement as a political prisoner. He realized that returning to French society would only tempt him to further political involvement, so he withdrew into voluntary exile at the Hague, where he died on 26 June 1870, aged 60.

He is buried in the private domain of Fourtou at Villalier, Aude.

== See also ==
- Barbès – Rochechouart (Paris Métro)
- Ferdinand Barrot
- Château de Vincennes
- French demonstration of 15 May 1848
- Albert Laponneraye
- Étienne-Denis Pasquier
- Listing of the works of Alexandre Falguière

== French bibliography ==
- "'Quelques mots à ceux qui possèdent en faveur des Prolétaires sans travail."' Barbès Carcassonne, 1837
- Karl Marx, « Luttes de classe en France », s.d.
- B.M. de Saint-Étienne, Correspondance de Martin Bernard. s.d.
- Tchernoff, I. Républicain sous la monarchie de juillet (Paris, 1905) par M. Le parti.
- Wasserman, Suzanne. Clubs de Barbès et de Blanqui en 1848, Les... (Paris)
- " Deux jours de condamnation à mort ", par Armand Barbès, 1re édition Bry ainé Paris 1848,2e Edition Pellet Paris 1849,3e Edition Pagnerre Paris 1870, 4e Edition Boulanger Paris 1893, 5e Edition l'Atelier du Gué Villelongue d'Aude 2005.
- “Dictionary of France from the 1815 Restoration to the Second Empire”, dirigé par Edgar Leon Newman, New York, Greenwood Press, 1987.
- Georges Clemenceau, Une jeunesse républicaine’’ Paris, s.d.
- "Barbès et les hommes de 1848", colloque de Carcassonne organisé en nov. 1998 par l’association Les Audois, les Archives départementales de l’Aude et l’Université de Toulouse-Le Mirail, sous la direction de Sylvie Caucanas et Rémy Cazals.
- À l'occasion de l'exposition "Barbès – 1848" (nov. 1998-fév 1999) à Carcassonne (Maison des Mémoires), un catalogue a été édité : Armand Barbès et la Révolution de 1848, par Sylvie Caucanas et Marie-Noëlle Maynard, Carcassonne, Musée des Beaux-Arts et Archives départementales de l’Aude, 79 p.
- Le Journal, 27 nov. 1896 (cité par Jean-Baptiste Duroselle : Clémenceau, Paris, Fayard, 1988, p. 51).
- Armand Barbès (1809–70), 3 vol. par Jean-François Jeanjean. (Paris et Carcassonne, 1909–52).
- "Armand Barbès, un révolutionnaire romantique" par Roger Merle, Privat, 1977.
- Hildevert-Adolphe Lara (1936). "Armand Barbès". Contribution de la Guadeloupe à la Pensée Française (in French) (Jean Crès ed.). Paris. pp. 80–88.
