= Albert Laponneraye =

French socialist, writer and editor (1808–1849)

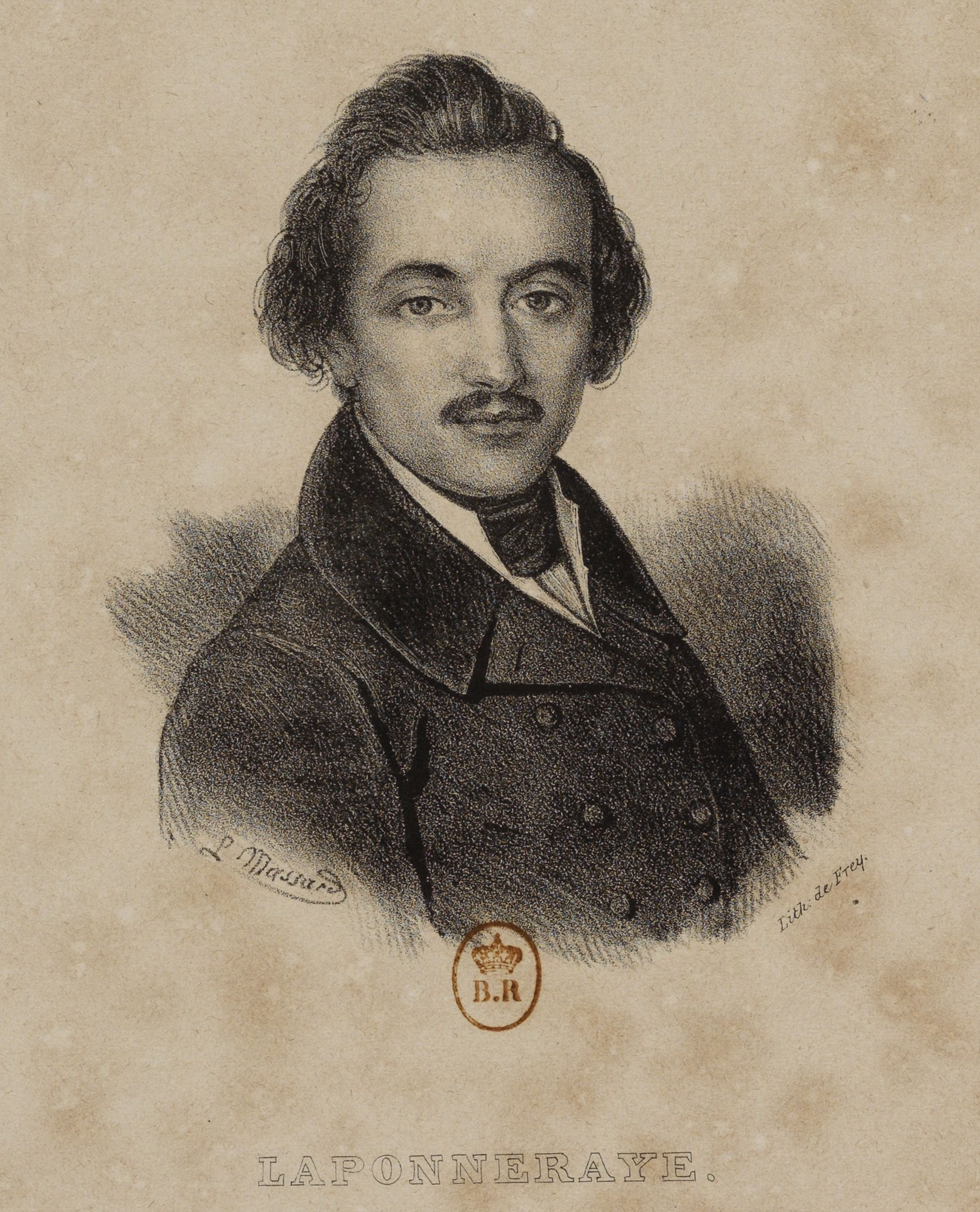
- Born: Albert Dulin de la Ponneraye; 8 May 1808; Tours, French Empire
- Died: 1 September 1849 (aged 41); Marseille, French Republic
- Occupations: Journalist, historian

Signature
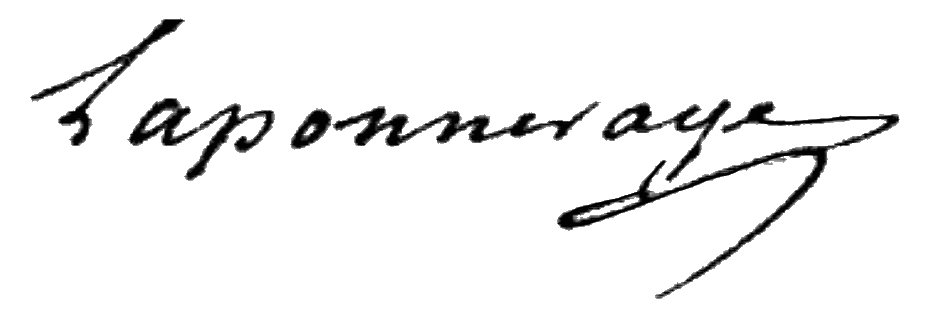

Albert Laponneraye (8 May 1808 – 1 September 1849) was a French republican socialist and journalist, popular historian, educator and an editor of Robespierre's writings. He was a representative of the Neo-Babouvist tendency in the 1840s, along with Richard Lahautière, Jean-Jacques Pillot and others. He combined Jacobin republicanism with egalitarian communism and anti-clericalism. He was influenced by the doctrines of Philippe Buonarroti and Étienne Cabet. In the 1830s and 40s Laponneraye was one of the best known advocates of republican communism. He is viewed as a forerunner of Karl Marx.

== Childhood ==
Albert Dulin de la Ponneraye was born in Tours. His father was Albert Philippe Dulin de la Ponneraye, an aristocrat and legitimist officer who had emigrated from 1791 to 1801. His mother, Geneviève Delomais, was an unwed peasant girl. Albert was abandoned at the gates of the Tours orphanage by his parents. In 1816, after they had another child, a sister named Zoé, they retrieved eight-year-old Albert from the orphanage and acknowledged him as their son.

== Early revolutionary activism and imprisonment ==
Nothing is known about Albert's education. In 1828, however, he moved to Paris and became a schoolteacher, precariously supporting himself, his mother and his sister after the death of his father. In sharp contrast to the Bourbon loyalties of his father, Albert Laponneraye, as he preferred to call himself, was by this time an ardent republican, an admirer of Maximilien Robespierre. Through the writings of Philippe Buonarroti, Laponneraye was introduced to the utopian Jacobin communism of François-Noël 'Gracchus' Babeuf and his 'Society of the Equals', who had tried to overthrow the Directory at the end of the French Revolution. In 1830, Laponneraye took an active part in the July Revolution, which overthrew the Restauration Bourbon king Charles X and replaced him with Louis Philippe, the duke of Orléans. Laponneraye and his republican associates were disappointed by this outcome and continued their revolutionary activities. Before long, Laponneraye was arrested; in 1831 he was imprisoned at Sainte-Pélagie, where his fellow inmates included François-Vincent Raspail and Armand Marrast (both late prominent republicans who participated in the Revolution of 1848).

At Sainte-Pélagie, Laponneraye became one of the leaders of a prison revolt. After it was put down, he was transferred to the forbidding fortress of La Force, where he was kept in solitary confinement. Although he had no access to books, he wrote a course of lectures on the history of France from 1789 to 1830, intended for the education of workers. He paid particular tribute to Robespierre. Upon his release, Laponneraye gave his lectures for free before a working class audience. The course was a stunning success, attracting between two and three hundred students, mostly workers and young people. The course began in November; by December, the police shut it down and arrested Laponneraye. He was convicted of exciting class hatred and sentenced to a year in prison and a fine of 1000 francs (a substantial sum in 1832). Upon his release, Laponneraye, undeterred, raised the stakes. He not only resumed teaching courses on French history and the revolutionary movement to workers, but assembled a crew of like-minded teachers to disseminate his message even more widely. Laponneraye and his colleagues organised themselves in the 'Society of Young France', which was affiliated with other notable republican associations, such as the 'Society of the Rights of Man' and the 'Society of the Friends of the People'.

== Editing Robespierre's writings ==
In addition to his educational work, Laponneraye devoted himself to an edition of the writings of Robespierre. In the course of this work he had the assistance of Charlotte Robespierre (1760–1834), Maximilien's sister. He had reportedly met her in 1830, after he had written an article in the journal L'Universel protesting against a forgery of Robespierre's memoirs. In 1832 Laponneraye had several long conversations with Charlotte Robespierre. The first volume of Laponneraye's edition of Robespierre's Oeuvres Choisis, covering the years 1789–1792, appeared in 1832, with a lengthy introduction from Laponneraye. It was enough to get him arrested again. In addition to his editorial work and his historical writings, on which he continued to work, he also published several political pamphlets aimed at workers, in which he advocated republicanism and communism. In 1833 he published two Lettres aux Prolétaires; consequently he was convicted of seeking to overthrow the government. He was sentenced to three years incarceration and the enormous fine of 3000 francs. Charlotte Robespierre died while he was in prison. Laponneraye wrote a funeral oration for her which was delivered by a friend.

Charlotte Robespierre left her papers to Laponneraye, including an unfinished manuscript of her memoirs. Using other notes from her papers to fill the gaps, Laponneraye produced an edition which was published. At the same time he began work on a complete edition of Maximilien Robespierre's works. Three of the four projected volumes were published, starting in 1840. Laponneraye contributed a long introduction. His editorial work made Robespierre's writings available to the French public for the first time; up to now, his ideas had only been known from hostile reports. This made Laponneraye a celebrity of sorts in republican circles. While in prison, Laponneraye also wrote a Cours d'Histoire and a Commentary on the Rights of Man, of which 200,000 copies were published and distributed.

== Political historiography ==
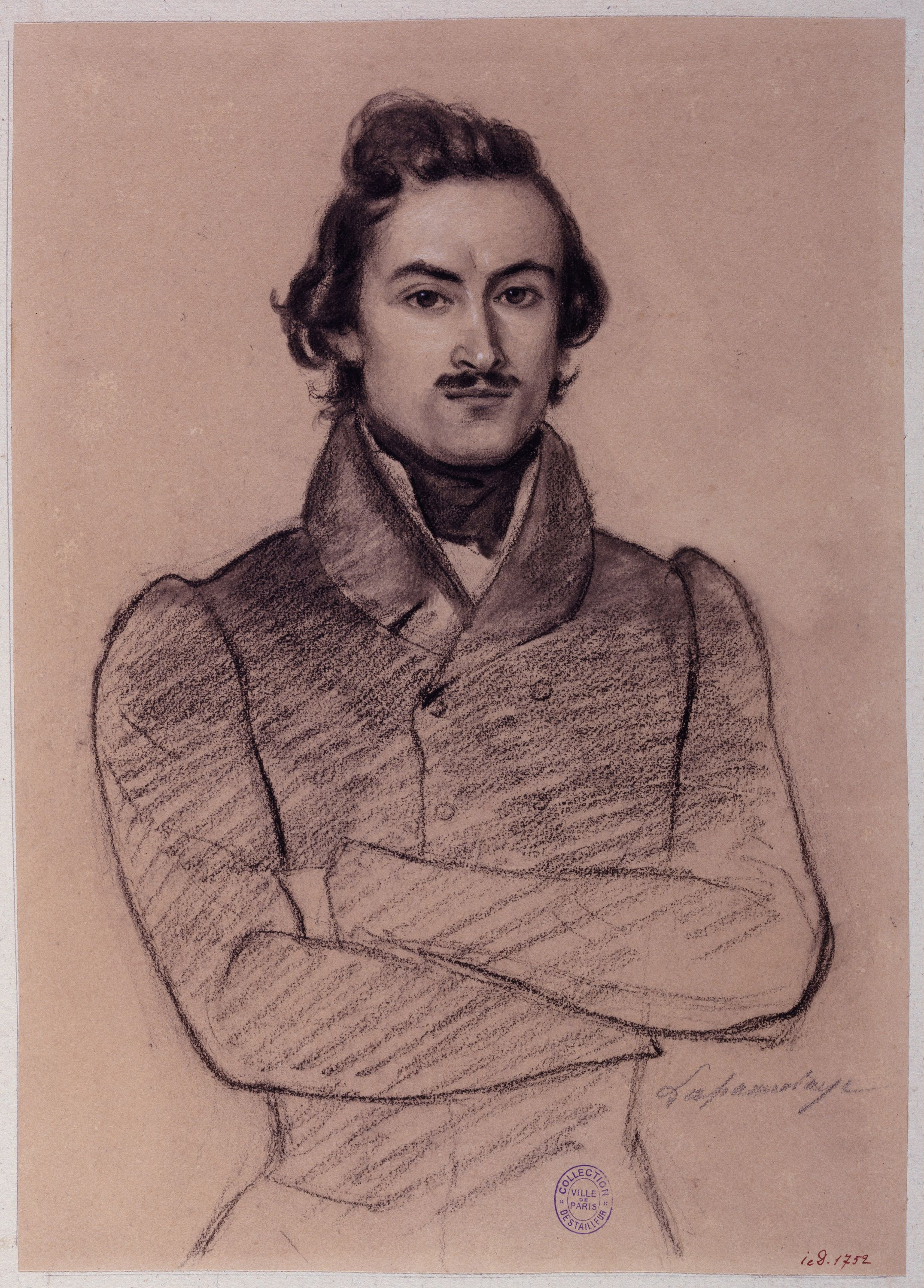
Laponneraye, ca. 1831

In his short life, Laponneraye wrote a prodigious amount. In addition to his journalism, he wrote copiously on historical topics, mostly on the history of the French Revolution and the revolutionary movement since then. He also forayed into ancient and medieval history, Russian history and the biographies of popes, kings and emperors and wrote an account of the culture of early 19th century Paris, its literature, monuments and fashions, which may be of interest to historians and social scientists today. Laponneraye often launched ambitious multi-volume projects he could only partially complete. Even so, he produced a prodigious amount of work, sometimes in collaboration with Hippolyte Lucas. While Laponneraye's historiography may not meet academic standards of scholarship, it was not out of keeping with the romantic historiography of his day. Laponneraye's historical writings were not intended as exercises in scholarship but as efforts in popular education and republican propaganda. However, it is noteworthy that Laponneraye, anticipating Marx to some extent, saw class struggles as the driving force of history and interpreted the French Revolution as the result of a class struggle between 'exploiters' and 'exploited'. The Revolution of 1789 had led to the triumph of the bourgeoisie but was incomplete and would eventually be completed by a proletarian revolution. A list of many of his publications from the 1830s and '40s is given below.

== Revolutionary journalism and Communism ==
In 1836, while still in prison, Laponneraye married Françoise Sébille. In 1837 he was released in the course of an amnesty. By now he was a respected figure among republicans and socialists. He had already made several forays into pamphleteering and journalism. In 1837 he founded his own journal, L'Intelligence, subtitled Journal du Droit Commun. In this he propagated his ideology of Jacobin republicanism, anti-clericalism and communism. The journal attracted talented collaborators, such as Richard Lahautière. It was read widely, not only in France but also in Switzerland, where it won the admiration of Buonarroti and his Babouvist followers. The utopian communist Étienne Cabet, who also from time to time collaborated with Laponneraye, praised L'Intelligence as 'the standard-bearer of the egalitarian party, the communist party' In 1839–1841, Laponneraye was a member of Cabet's communist association.

Laponneraye's passionate declarations of hatred for tyranny and his history as a prisoner of conscience also attracted the attentions of the republican conspirators Louis Auguste Blanqui and Armand Barbès. Blanqui and Barbès were the leaders of the secret 'Society of the Seasons', which, in 1839, carried out an ill-fated insurrection. They had prepared a list of people they hoped to co-opt to a revolutionary Provisional Government, and Laponneraye's name was on it. The list was discovered by the police. Laponneraye avoided arrest for a few months, moving from city to city and occasionally spotted by police informers. His paper, L'Intelligence, was shut down in 1840, and Richard Lahautière, Laponneraye's chief collaborator, was imprisoned. Laponneraye was left with a personal debt of 20,566 francs. Meanwhile, Blanqui and Barbès engaged in mutual recriminations in prison and grew to become bitter enemies.

Apparently the authorities eventually accepted that Laponneraye had not been involved in the 'Society of the Seasons' plot. In 1841 he launched a new journal, Le Club, presented as a 'journal of political and philosophical discussion' and advocating the widest application of the 'democratic principle'. After this journal failed, he launched the Feuilleton des Feuilletons, intended as digest of news and noteworthy publications from across Europe. This did not do well either, and in 1845, Laponneraye could not come up with the 484 francs timbre duty. In 1846 Laponneraye was in financial distress. His republican friends came to his aid by organising a 'subscription' to raise funds for him.

In 1847, Laponneraye published the journal Revue Politique et Commerciale de la Méditerranée; the title suggests that he may have been trying for a broader, more middle-class audience.

== Revolution and death ==
In February 1848, the Orléanist monarchy which had so often imprisoned Laponneraye was overthrown and the Second Republic proclaimed. The revolution found Laponneraye in the south of France. He welcomed it enthusiastically and threw himself into political journalism and organisational work. He contributed to L'Indépendant and, in October 1848, founded his own journal, La Voix du Peuple, to which his sister Zoé also contributed. Laponneraye was then living in Marseille, where he became president of the local branch of the Solidarité Républicaine. This association included prominent republicans like Martin Bernard, Alexandre Ledru-Rollin and Charles Delescluze. Its programme was the establishment of the 'Social and Democratic Republic' and the co-ordination and centralisation of all republican forces. In 1849 the organisation was outlawed as a 'secret society'.

Laponneraye's years of imprisonment and poverty had taken their toll. He was suffering from a heart condition and was ill-equipped to withstand the cholera epidemic that broke out in the Basse-Durance region in the fall of 1849. After an illness of several days, Laponneraye died in Marseille of what was said to be 'typhoid fever'. He was 41 years old. Alphonse Esquiros took over his duties at La Voix du Peuple; renamed Le Peuple in 1850, it became the most important republican paper in southern France.

A street in Tours is named after Albert Laponneraye.

== Works ==
Laponneraye's works are not generally available in English. Some of his works in French include:

- Histoire de l'amiral de Coligny. Paris, Delaforest, 1830.
- Cours public d'histoire de France, depuis 1789 jusqu'en 1830. 1831–1834.
- Commentaire sur les droits de l'homme. 1832.
- Défense du citoyen Laponneraye, prononcé aux assises de la Seine le 21 avril 1832. Paris, A. Mie, 1832.
- Lettre aux prolétaires. Hamburg, 1833.
- Déclaration des droits de l'homme et du citoyen. Avec des commentaires par Laponneraye. Paris, A. Mie, 1833.
- Notice historique sur Maximilien Robespierre. Imprimerie de Grossteite, 1833.
- Mélanges d'économie sociale, de littérature et de morale. Paris, Dépôt central, 1835.
- Dictionnaire historique des Peuples anciens et modernes, leurs coutumes, leurs lois, leur gouvernement, les principaux faits de leur histoire, etc., ou Résumé de l'histoire universelle. Paris, Pagnerre, 1835–1836, 2 vol's.
- Catéchisme démocratique. Paris, Imprimerie de Baudoin, 1836.
- Description pittoresque et statistique de Paris au XIXe siècle, ou Tableau de ses édifices, de ses monuments, de ses arts, de sa littérature, de son industrie, de son commerce, de ses coutumes, de son organisation municipale, administrative, politique et judiciaire, etc., précédé d'un résumé de l'histoire de Paris depuis son origine jusqu'à nos jours. Paris, Imprimerie de Chassaignon, 1836.
- Biographie des rois, des empereurs et des papes. Paris, Dépôt central, 1837–1838, 2 vol's.
- Histoire complète de la Révolution, depuis 1789 jusqu'en 1814. Paris, 1838.
- Histoire des révolutions de l'Europe depuis l'invasion des Barbares jusqu'en 1789, pour servir d'introduction à toutes les histoires de la révolution française. Paris, bureau des révolutions de l'Europe, 1839.
- Réfutation des Idées napoléoniennes. Senlis, 1839.
- Histoire des rivalités et des luttes de la France et de l'Angleterre depuis le Moyen Âge jusqu'à nos jours (with Hippolyte Lucas). Paris, 1842.
- Précis historique des rivalités et des luttes de la France et de l'Angleterre; précédé d'une lettre à l'auteur par M. Augustin Thierry. Paris, Cajani, 1845.
- Histoire de la Révolution française, depuis 1789 jusqu'en 1845. Paris, Cajani, 1845, 3 vol's.
- Histoire universelle depuis les premiers âges du monde. (1845–1848) Incomplete; 7 volumes of a projected 20 were written.
- Histoire des guerres civiles de France depuis les temps mérovingiens jusqu'à nos jours (with Hippolyte Lucas). Paris, bureau de la Société de l'industrie fraternelle, 1847, 2 vols.
- Histoire de France, depuis les temps les plus reculés jusqu'en 1847, d'après MM. Sismondi, Augustin Thierry, Guizot, Barante, Michelet, Henri Martin. Paris, 1847 (12 booklets of a projected 100 appeared).
- Histoire des grands capitaines français, depuis Clovis jusqu'à Napoléon. Paris, 1848.
- Catéchisme républicain. Avignon, Peyri, 1848.
- Lettre à Mgr le prince Louis Bonaparte, constable de la bonne ville de Londres. 1848.
- La République est appelée à rétablir l'ordre moral aussi bien que l'ordre matériel. 1848.

== Sources ==
- Billington, J.H., Fire in the Minds of Men: The Origins of the Revolutionary Faith. New York, 1980 [2009].
- Hazareesingh, S., 'Une profonde haine de la tyrannie: Albert Laponneraye et les paradoxes de la memoire républicaine.' In: Deleplace, M. (ed.), Les discours de la haine: récits et figures de la passion dans la cité. Septentrion, 2009, p. 227 ff.
- Garaudy, R., Les Sources françaises du Socialisme scientifique. Paris, 1948.
