= James Bronterre O'Brien =

Irish Chartist activist and journalist

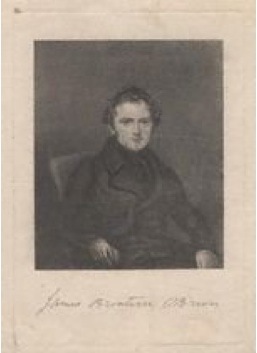
James Bronterre O'Brien.

James Bronterre O'Brien (February 1804 – 23 December 1864) was an Irish Chartist leader, reformer and journalist.

== Early years ==
James O'Brien was born near Granard, County Longford, Ireland in 1804 or 1805. His father, Daniel O'Brien, appears to have operated a failing alcohol and tobacco business before he pursued business ventures in the West Indies where he died from an illness.

He went to a local church school, where one of his teachers recognised his intellectual abilities and arranged for him to be educated at the progressive Lovell Edgeworth School. In 1822 he proceeded to Trinity College, Dublin, where he won several academic prizes including the Science Gold Medal. After studying law at King's Inns, O'Brien moved to England in 1829 with the intention of becoming a lawyer in London.

== Political awakening and activism ==
In London he joined the Radical Reform Association where he met Henry Hunt, William Cobbett, Henry Hetherington and other leaders of the struggle for universal suffrage. In 1836 he joined the London Working Men's Association.

O'Brien began contributing articles to Henry Hetherington's Poor Man's Guardian. He signed these articles with the pseudonym 'Bronterre' and James O'Brien eventually adopted it as his middle name. He worked very closely with Hetherington and when he was imprisoned for publishing an unstamped newspaper, O'Brien took over the editorship of The Poor Man's Guardian. O'Brien and Hetherington also collaborated on other unstamped newspapers such as The Destructive and the London Dispatch. In 1837 O'Brien began publishing Bronterre's National Reformer. In an attempt to avoid paying stamp duty, the journal included essays rather than 'news items'. During this period, Henry Hetherington and O'Brien led the struggle against the stamp duty and were consistent in their arguments that working people needed cheap newspapers that contained political information.

O'Brien was influenced by the socialist writer, Gracchus Babeuf, who had been executed during the French Revolution. In 1836 O'Brien began publishing translations of Babeuf's work in the Poor Man's Guardian. He also included Filippo Buonarroti's account of Babeuf and the Conspiracy of Equals. O'Brien became fascinated with the history of radicalism and began work on books on Robespierre, the French Revolution and the English Commonwealth. However, the authorities raided his house in 1838 and seized his manuscripts and the projects were never completed.

In 1838 O'Brien added his support for a more militant approach to winning the vote that was being advocated by Feargus O'Connor and George Julian Harney through the London Democratic Association. However, O'Brien, unlike O'Connor, refused to support the use of violence to achieving universal suffrage. O'Brien argued that the Chartists should adopt a policy that was midway between the petitioning supported by William Lovett and the 'moral force chartists', and the violence being threatened by O'Connor's 'physical force' group.

After Bronterre's National Reformer ceased publication, O'Brien worked for O'Connor's Northern Star. His articles played an important role in increasing the circulation of what had become the most important of the radical newspapers. As well as writing for the Northern Star, James O'Brien also found time to publish his own newspaper The Operative.

== Turning point ==
O'Brien continued to be active in the Chartist movement and in 1840 he was arrested and charged with making a seditious speech in Manchester. He was convicted of sedition and sentenced to eighteen months in Lancaster Prison. When O'Brien was released from prison he found it difficult to continue working with Feargus O'Connor. The two men disagreed over the issue of Physical Force. Another source of dispute concerned parliamentary elections. O'Brien favoured the idea of putting up Chartist candidates whereas O'Connor preferred the tactic of putting pressure on the Whig government by threatening to vote for Tory candidates. O'Brien was involved in standing Chartist candidates against Government Ministers in key seats, particularly in standing against Lord Palmerston in Tiverton.

O'Brien finally broke with O'Connor when along with Henry Vincent and Robert Gammage he joined the Complete Suffrage Union. O'Brien continued to publish newspapers. He joined with his old friend Henry Hetherington to revive the Poor Man's Guardian in 1843 and this was followed by the National Reformer in 1844. These newspapers were not a financial success and by May 1847, both papers had ceased publication.

After the failure of these two newspapers O'Brien concentrated on writing for other publications such as Reynold's Weekly and the Glasgow Sentinel. He also gave public lectures and in 1851 he opened the Eclectic Institute in Denmark Street, Soho, London, where adult education classes were offered in English, French, science and mathematics.

== Decline and demise ==
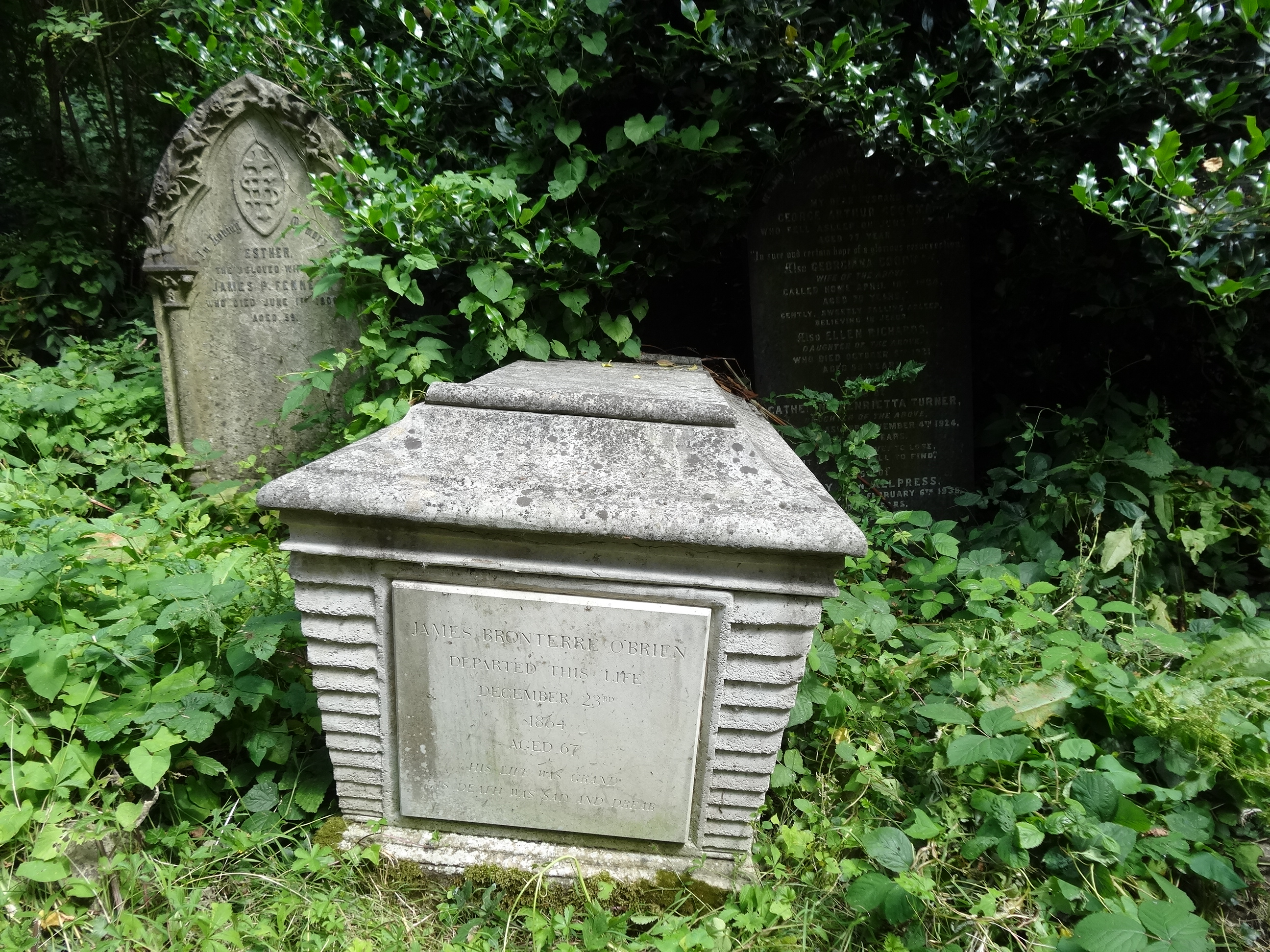
James Bronterre O'Brien's grave

By the 1850s O'Brien's poverty began to damage his health. He suffered from bronchitis and his Chartist friends attempted to raise money in recognition of the great sacrifices that he had made in the struggle to win universal suffrage and the freedom of the press. However, the damage to his health was so bad that he spent his last years bed-ridden. James Bronterre O'Brien died on 23 December 1864, and is buried in Abney Park Cemetery. His grave is located next to the Cedar Path.
