= Buonarroti's History of Babeuf's Conspiracy for Equality =

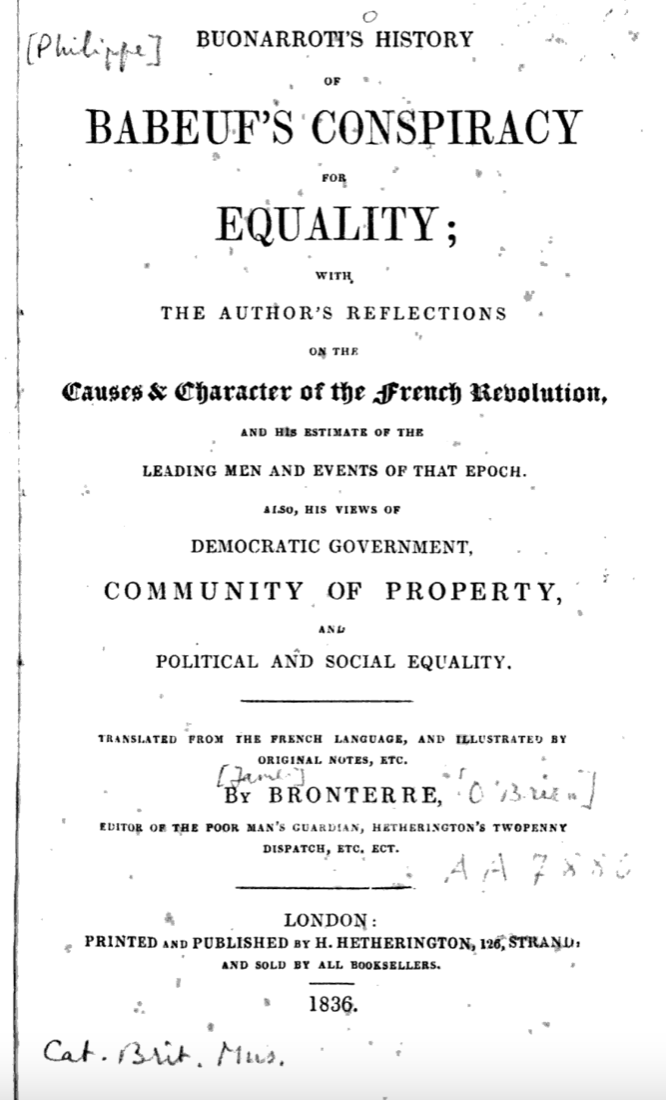
- Title page of 1836 English edition
- Author: Philippe Buonarroti
- Original title: Histoire de la Conspiration pour l'Égalité dite de Babeuf
- Translator: James Bronterre O'Brien
- Language: French
- Subject: Conspiracy of the Equals
- Genre: History book
- Publication date: 1828
- Publication place: France

Buonarroti's History of Babeuf's Conspiracy for Equality (Histoire de la Conspiration pour l'Égalité dite de Babeuf) is a history book about Gracchus Babeuf's failed Conspiracy of the Equals penned in 1828 by Italian writer and conspirator Philippe Buonarroti, himself a member of Babeuf's inner circle. The book was immensely successful not only in France but abroad as well. Chartist leader James Bronterre O'Brien translated the work into English in 1836 and over fifty thousand copies of the translated work were subsequently sold in the United Kingdom. Both Buonarroti and O'Brien took considerable risk when publishing the work, as evidenced by their use of acronyms to identify surviving members of the Conspiracy in their correspondence with one another.
