= Philippe Buonarroti =

Italian utopian socialist (1761–1837)

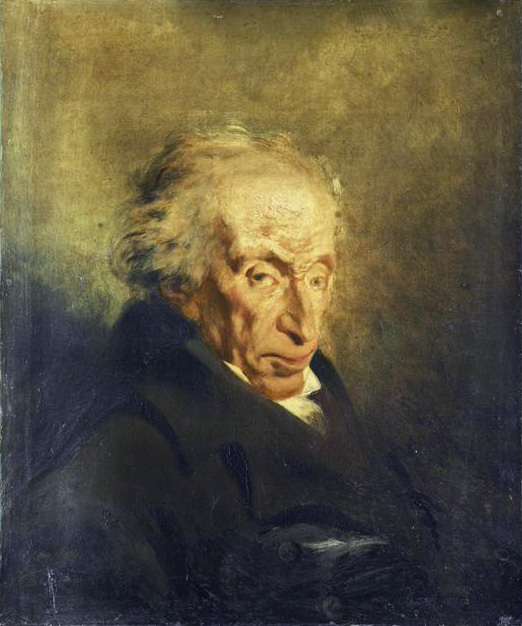
- Portrait of Filippo Buonarotti, 1830, Philippe-Auguste Jeanron
- Born: Filippo Giuseppe Maria Ludovico Buonarroti; 11 November 1761; Pisa, Grand Duchy of Tuscany
- Died: 16 September 1837 (aged 75); Paris, Kingdom of France
- Resting place: Montmartre Cemetery
- Education: University of Pisa
- Occupations: Writer, philosopher, conspirator
- Writing career
- Notable works: History of Babeuf's Conspiracy for Equality; Observations on Maximilien Robespierre

National Commissar of Oneglia
- In office April 1794 – March 1795

Signature
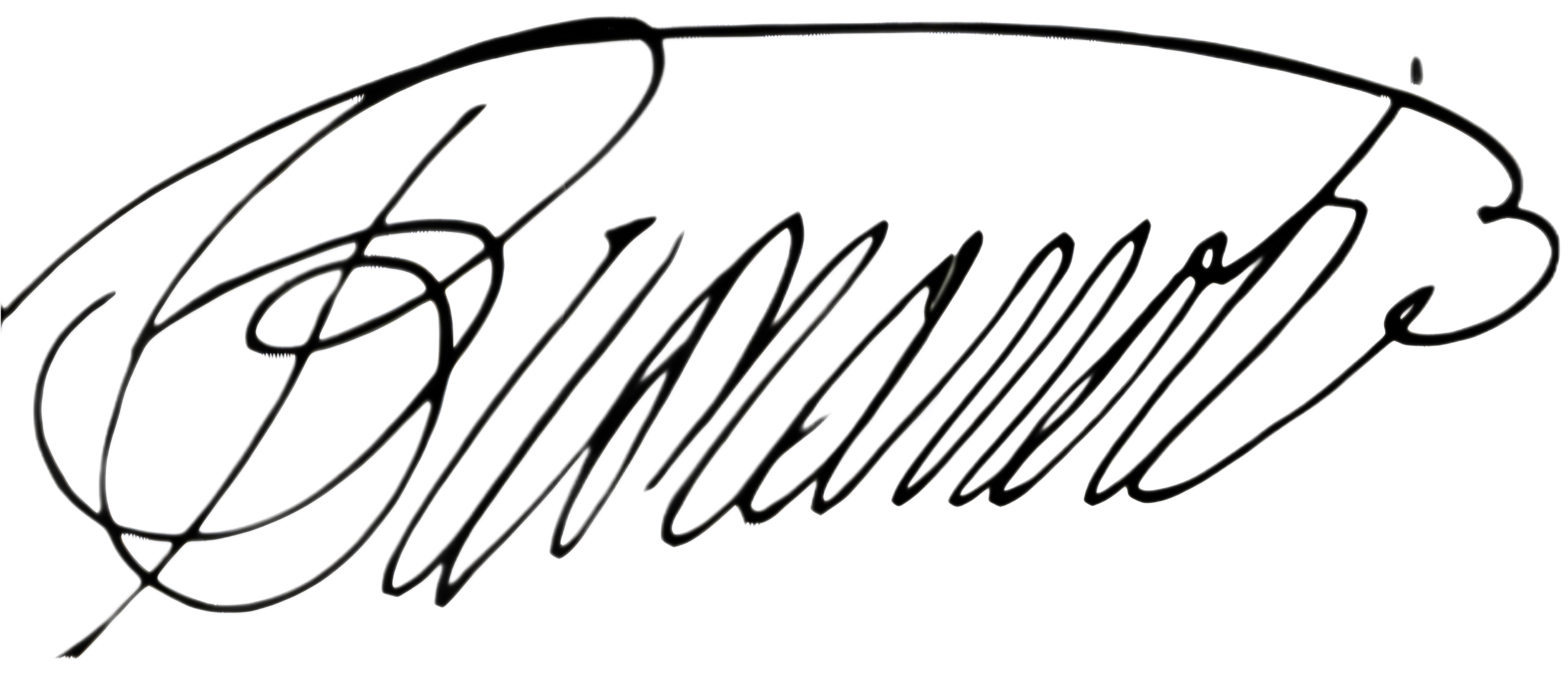

Filippo Giuseppe Maria Ludovico Buonarroti (11 November 1761 – 16 September 1837), more usually referred to by the French version Philippe Buonarroti, was an Italian-French utopian socialist, writer, agitator, freemason, and conspirator. He was active in Corsica, France, and Geneva. His History of Babeuf’s Conspiracy of Equals (1828) became a quintessential text for revolutionaries, inspiring such socialists as Louis Auguste Blanqui and Karl Marx. He proposed a mutualist strategy that would revolutionize society by stages, starting from monarchy to liberalism, then to radicalism, and finally to communism.

== Life ==
=== Early activism ===
Buonarroti was born in Pisa in the Grand Duchy of Tuscany to a family of local nobility, the same Buonarroti family to which Michelangelo belonged. He studied law at the University of Pisa, where he founded what was seen by the authorities of Grand Duke Peter Leopold as a subversive paper, the Gazetta Universale (1787). During his university years, he acquainted himself with the works of Rousseau, Mably, and Morelly.

It is thought that he joined a Masonic Lodge sometime in 1786. He was also possible a member of a Illuminati lodge in Florence.

Though under constant surveillance by the authorities, he expressed support for the French Revolution when it broke out. He travelled to Corsica to spread the revolutionary message with the Giornale Patriottico di Corsica, the first Italian-language paper to openly support the French Revolution. In Corsica, Buonarroti joined the Jacobin Club, and became a friend of the Bonapartes.

=== Under the Convention ===
Buonarroti was expelled from the island in June 1791 and returned to his native Tuscany whereupon he was arrested and imprisoned.

In 1793 he travelled to Paris and became a member of the Society of the Panthéon. Maximilien Robespierre placed him in charge of organizing the expatriate Italian revolutionaries, which he did from a base in Nice. After denouncing Pasquale Paoli to the National Convention, he was rewarded for his revolutionary activities by a special decree of French citizenship in May 1793.

In April 1794 he was nominated National Commissar of the Principality of Oneglia, a small state ruled in personal union with the Duchy of Savoy that was fully surrounded by the Republic of Genoa. Oneglia was the site of refuge for many pro-French Italians during the French attack on Northern Italy. During his tenure as National Commissar, Buonarroti effectively ruled as dictator and implemented many revolutionary policies, including free public education, abolition of class-based privileges, wheat distribution for the impoverished, and price controls.

=== Babeuf conspiracy and later life ===
He was recalled to Paris in 1795, after the Thermidorian Reaction, whereupon he was imprisoned in the Plessis prison after his friends in office had been deposed by the Thermidorian Reaction. There he met Gracchus Babeuf, and became one of his most fervent supporters and co-conspirators during the time of their imprisonment together from March to October.

Buonarotti was rearrested by the French Directory on 8 May 1796, along with Babeuf and other conspirators. Babeuf was guillotined, and Buonarotti formally imprisoned in February 1797, and held on the island of Oléron. Napoleon Bonaparte allowed him to go free after he had become First Consul in 1799. During the Empire, Buonarroti took part in anti-Bonapartist conspiracies, and was put under police surveillance.

He exiled himself to Geneva, and moved to Brussels during the Bourbon Restoration. In 1808 Buonarroti formed a Masonic Lodge, Les Sublimes Maîtres Parfaits (The Sublime Perfect Masters), to which only serving freemasons were admitted. Within this lodge, he formed an inner circle which he used to further his political dreams and aspirations. He returned to Paris after the 1830 July Revolution. He was then acquainted with Marc-René de Voyer de Paulmy d'Argenson, Charles Teste, Ulysse Trélat, Hareau, François-Vincent Raspail, Louis Blanc and Auguste Blanqui and contributed a great deal to both the Jacobin revival and the agitations of the 1830s.

He died suddenly in Paris on 16 September 1837.

== Influence ==
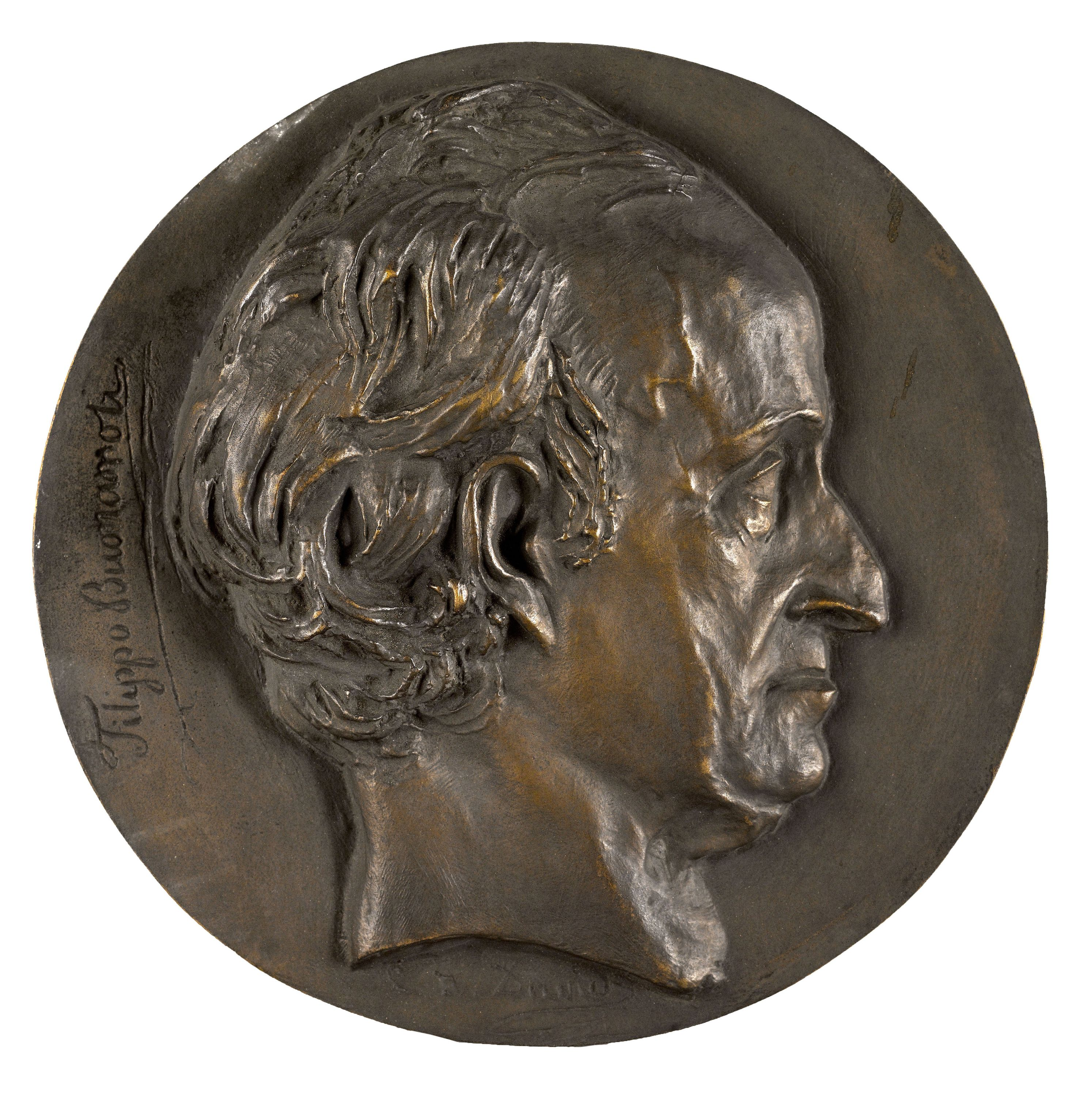
Commemorative medal of Buonarroti by David d'Angers

Buonarroti's revolutionary principles were to prove important during the 1830s and early 1840s; Auguste Blanqui learned many of his insurrectionary skills and tactics from Buonarroti, and the Conspiration pour l'Égalité dite de Babeuf, suivie du procès auquel elle donna lieu may be seen as an important text in this respect.

Later, the 1848 revolutionaries in France and elsewhere placed much emphasis on this work as a cornerstone.

Mikhail Bakunin praised Buonarroti as "the greatest conspirator of his age", and was heavily influenced by the revolutionary practice of Buonarroti. The Bakunin scholar Arthur Lehning has written of Buonarroti: “He too built up on an international scale, though over a much longer period, an elaborate underground network, on a freemason pattern, sometimes using Masonic institutions, to work for his egalitarian creed of 1796, for a social revolution and for the republicanisation of Europe. For forty years the principles remained the same: the leadership was secret; the existence of the higher grades was unknown to the lower; protean in character, this network took advantage of and used other societies.” Some argue that these principles are clearly evident in Bakunin's writings.

== Writings ==
- La Riforma dell'Alcorano (1786)
- Conspiration des égaux (1828)
- Histoire de la Conspiration pour l'Égalité dite de Babeuf (1828)
- Riflessi sul governo federativo applicato all'Italia (1831)
- Del governo d'un popolo in rivolta per conseguire la libertà (1833)
- Observations sur Maximilien Robespierre (1836)

== See also ==
- Conspiracy of the Equals
