= Panthéon Club =

Petit-bourgeois political club convened during the French Revolution, 1795-1796

- Reunion of Friends of the Republic
- Réunion des Amis de la République
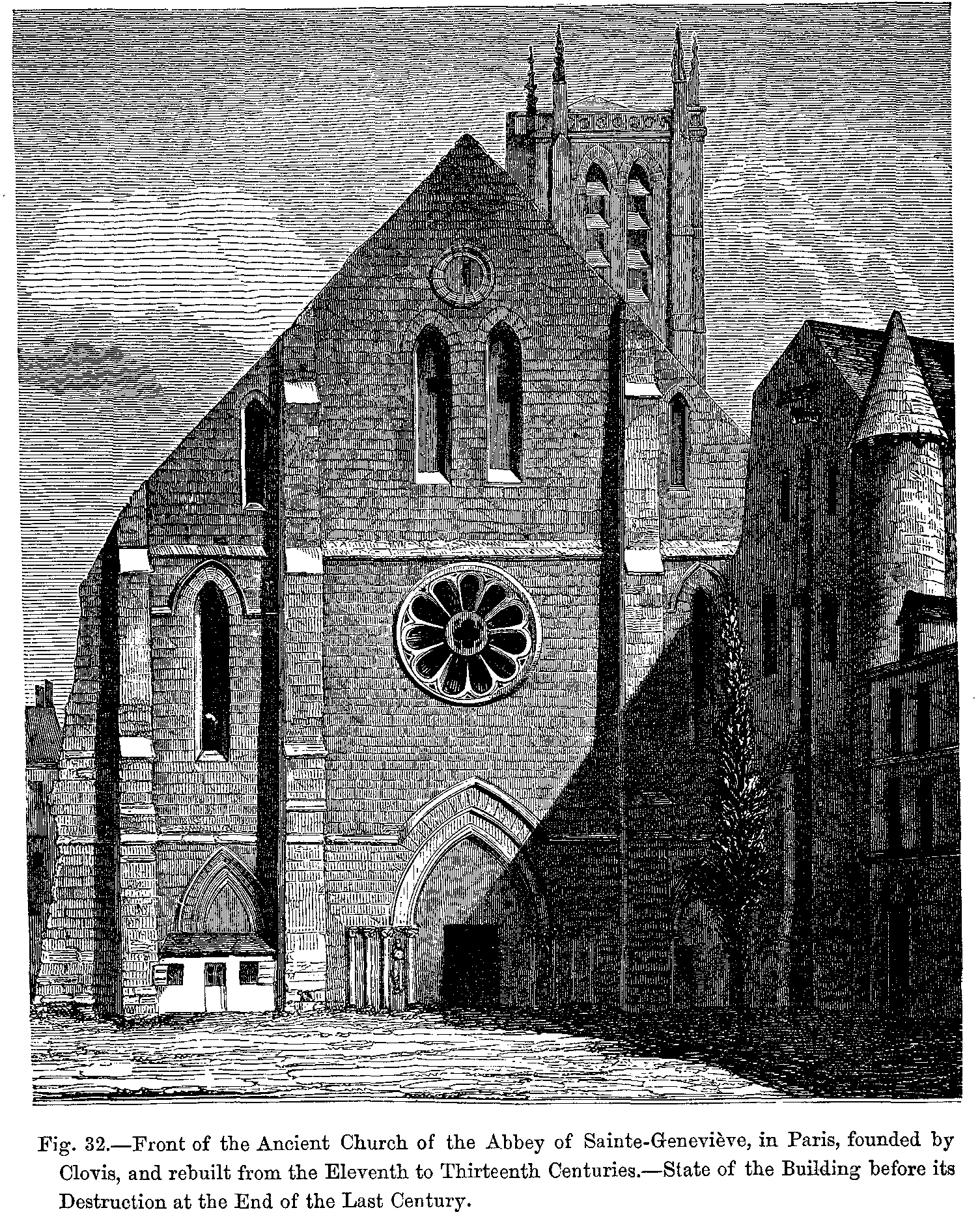
- The Abbey of Saint Genevieve
- Named after: Panthéon
- Predecessor: Jacobin Club
- Formation: 6 November 1795
- Dissolved: 27 February 1796
- Type: Political Club
- Legal status: dissolved
- Headquarters: Abbey of Saint Genevieve, Montagne Sainte-Geneviève

The Panthéon Club (French: Club du Panthéon) was a French revolutionary political club founded in Paris the 6 November 1795. Its official name was Reunion of Friends of the Republic (Réunion des Amis de la République). It was composed of petite-bourgeois former French-revolutionaries — primarily Jacobins and their sympathizers. (Note: Membership was 50 French livres which excluded common people)

The club met on the Montagne Sainte-Geneviève, in the former royal Abbey of St Genevieve, near the Panthéon, now Lycée Henri-IV.

Among the founders was René Lebois: a printer and journalist of the periodical Orateur plébéien, and acquaintance to Paul Barras. The club was attended by those who wanted to redirect the Directory policy toward the left in the wake of the defeat of the royalist insurrection of 13 Vendémiaire. However, the politics of the club were initially rather moderate, non-provocative, and respectful of legality in refusing to receive the ineligible National Convention members.

But the club soon attracted a number of former Montagnards, including Jean-Pierre-André Amar and Pierre Joseph Duhem, former members of the Committee of General Security, Pierre-Antoine Antonelle, Sylvain Maréchal, Restif de La Bretonne, Jean-Nicolas Pache, and Robert Lindet, as well as Philippe Buonarroti, a Babeuf friend, who moved the club in the direction of radical republicanism.

Membership in the club grew rapidly: from 934 members the 29 November 1795, its meetings attracted about 2,400 people in February 1796.

Several members of the club were defeated in the National Convention election, and resultingly shifted further left to provoke more action from the young new government. Members such as Augustin Darthé — former prosecutor for the Revolutionary Tribunal — nurtured the ambition of transforming the club. They wanted the government to give up the Constitution of the Year III of 1795 to go back to the more radical Constitution of 1793. Although not a member of the club, Gracchus Babeuf was periodically invited to speak there, using the space to develop and probe the doctrine of egalité he viewed as essential for communism.

Fearing that the club might disturb law and public order and even its own legitimacy, the Directory ordered its dissolution, and on 27 February 1796 General Napoléon Bonaparte, commanding the Army of the Interior, carried out the orders to close it down.

Many leaders of the club would subsequently form the core of Babeuf's Conspiracy of the Equals.
