= Pre-Marxist communism =

Communist ideologies prior to the works of Karl Marx

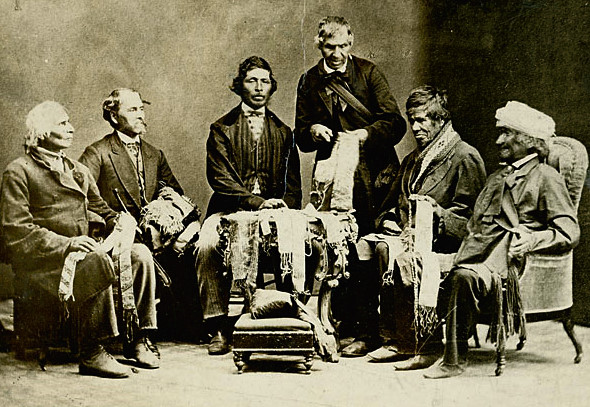
Chiefs of the Six Nations of the Haudenosaunee, a vital influence on and precursor to Marxist communism.

While Karl Marx and Friedrich Engels defined communism as a political movement in 1848, there were similar ideas in the past which could be called communist experiments. Marx himself saw the original hunter-gatherer state of humankind as primitive communism. Marx theorized that only after humanity was capable of producing surplus did private property develop.

== Pre-history ==
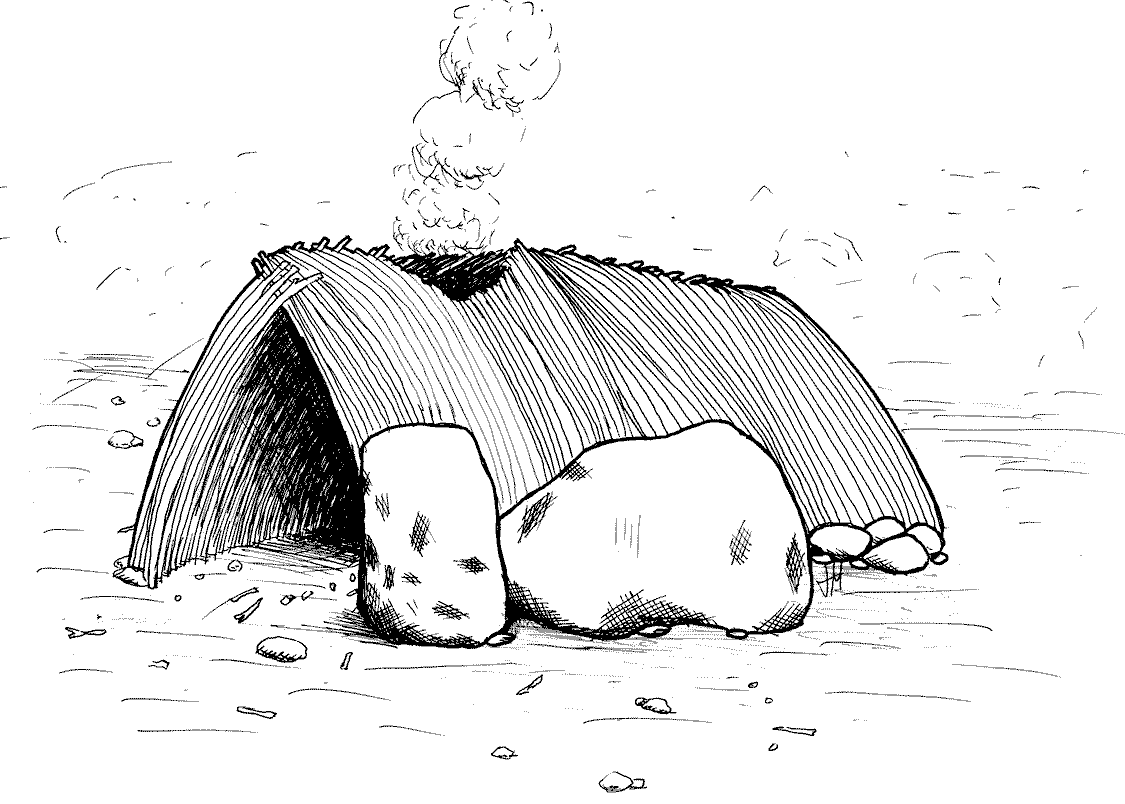
An artist's rendering of a temporary wood house, based on evidence found at Terra Amata (in Nice, France) and dated to the Lower Paleolithic (c. 400,000 BP)

Karl Marx and other early communist theorists believed that hunter-gatherer societies as were found in the Paleolithic through to horticultural societies as found in the Chalcolithic were essentially egalitarian. He, therefore, termed their ideology to be primitive communism. Since Marx, sociologists and archaeologists have developed the idea of and research on primitive communism. According to Harry W. Laidler, one of the first writers to espouse a belief in the primitive communism of the past was the Roman Stoic philosopher Seneca who stated, "How happy was the primitive age when the bounties of nature lay in common ... They held all nature in common which gave them secure possession of the public wealth." Because of this he believed that such primitive societies were the richest as there was no poverty. According to Erik van Ree, other Greco-Roman writers that expressed a belief in a prehistoric humanity that had a communist-like societal structure include Diodorus Siculus, Virgil, and Ovid.

Due to the strong evidence of an egalitarian society, lack of hierarchy and lack of economic inequality, historian Murray Bookchin has argued that Çatalhöyük was an early example of anarcho-communism, and so an example of primitive communism in a proto-city.

== Bronze Age ==
It has been argued that the Indus Valley civilisation is an example of a primitive communist society, due to its perceived lack of conflict and social hierarchies. Others argue that such an assessment is not correct.

== Classical antiquity ==
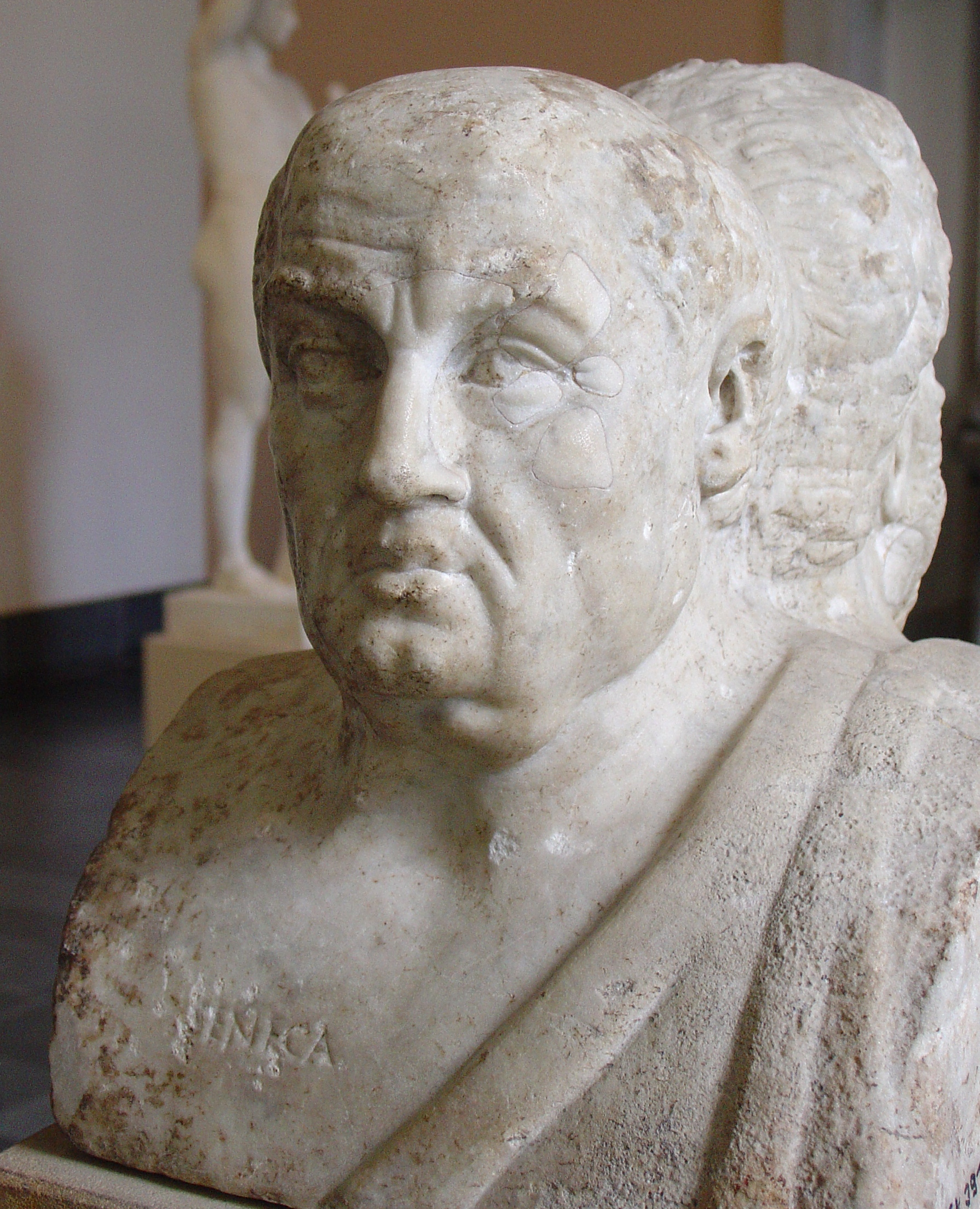
The 1st century BC Roman philosopher Seneca believed that humans had fallen from a Golden Age of primitive communism

There are scholars who have traced communist ideas back to ancient times, particularly in the work of Pythagoras and Plato. Followers of Pythagoras, for instance, lived in one building and held their property in common because the philosopher taught the absolute equality of property with all worldly possessions being brought into a common store.

It is argued that Plato's Republic described in great detail a communist-dominated society wherein power is delegated in the hands of intelligent philosopher or military guardian class and rejected the concept of family and private property. In a social order divided into warrior-kings and craftsmen and peasants, Plato conceived an ideal Greek city-state without any form of capitalism and commercialism with business enterprise, political plurality, and working-class unrest considered as evils that must be abolished. While Plato's vision cannot be considered a precursor of communist thinking, his utopian speculations are shared by other utopian thinkers later on. An important feature that distinguishes Plato's ideal society in the Republic is that the ban on private property applies only to the superior classes (rulers and warriors), not to the general public.

== Roman imperial period to late antiquity ==
Biblical scholars have argued that the mode of production seen in early Hebrew society was a communitarian one akin to primitive communism.

The early Church Fathers, like their non-Abrahamic predecessors, maintained that human society had declined to its current state from a now lost egalitarian social order. There are those who consider that the early Christian Church, as described in the Acts of the Apostles, was an early form of communism. The view is that communism was just Christianity in practice and Jesus Christ was himself a communist. This link was highlighted in one of Marx's early writings which stated: "As Christ is the intermediary unto whom man unburdens all his divinity, all his religious bonds, so the state is the mediator unto which he transfers all his Godlessness, all his human liberty". Furthermore, the Marxist ethos that aims for unity reflects the Christian universalist teaching that humankind is one and that there is only one god who does not discriminate among people. Later historians have supported the reading of early church communities as communistic in structure.

Pre-Marxist communism was also present in the attempts to establish communistic societies such as those made by the ancient Jewish sects the Essenes and by the Judean desert sect.

== Post-classical history ==
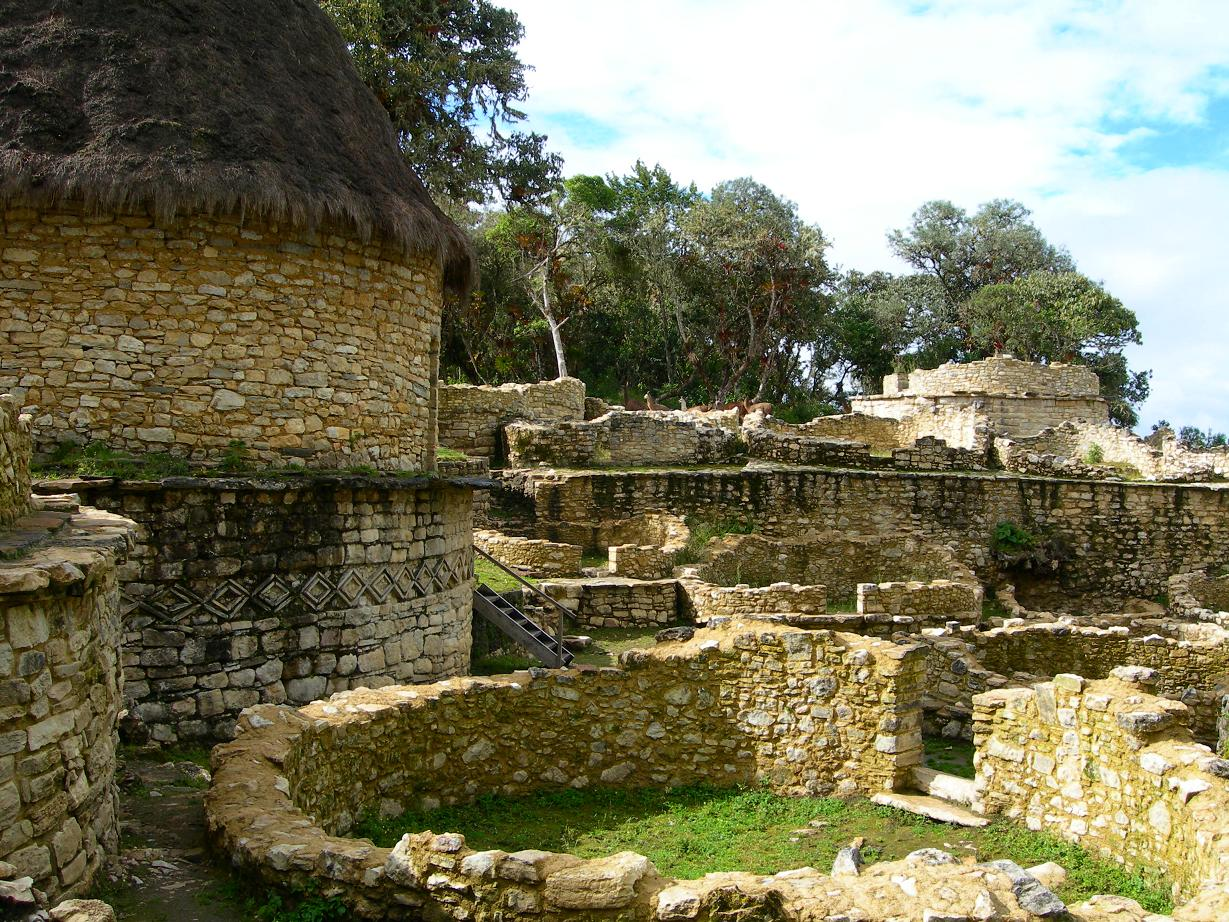
Inside the urban centre Kuélap of the Chachapoya culture

=== Europe ===
Peter Kropotkin argued that the elements of mutual aid and mutual defense expressed in the medieval commune of the Middle Ages and its guild system were the same sentiments of collective self-defense apparent in modern anarchism, communism and socialism. From the High Middle Ages in Europe, various groups supporting Christian communist and communalist ideas were occasionally adopted by reformist Christian sects. An early 12th century proto-Protestant group originating in Lyon known as the Waldensians held their property in common in accordance with the Book of Acts, but were persecuted by the Catholic Church and retreated to Piedmont. Around 1300 the Apostolic Brethren in northern Italy were taken over by Fra Dolcino who formed a sect known as the Dulcinians which advocated ending feudalism, dissolving hierarchies in the church, and holding all property in common. The Peasants' Revolt in England has been an inspiration for "the medieval ideal of primitive communism", with the priest John Ball of the revolt being an inspirational figure to later revolutionaries and having allegedly declared, "things cannot go well in England, nor ever will, until all goods are held in common."

=== South America ===
The Chachapoya culture indicated an egalitarian non-hierarchical society through a lack of archaeological evidence and a lack of power expressing architecture that would be expected for societal leaders such as royalty or aristocracy.

=== Asia ===
Mazdak, a Sasanian prophet who founded the eponymous Zoroastrian offshoot of Mazdakism, is argued by various historical sources, including Muhammad Iqbal, to have been a proto-communist. This view originates from Mazdak's belief in the abolition of private property, advocacy of social revolution, and criticism of the clergy.

Researchers have commented on the communistic nature of the society built by the Qarmatians around Al-Ahsa from the 9th to 10th centuries.

== Early modern period ==
=== Europe ===
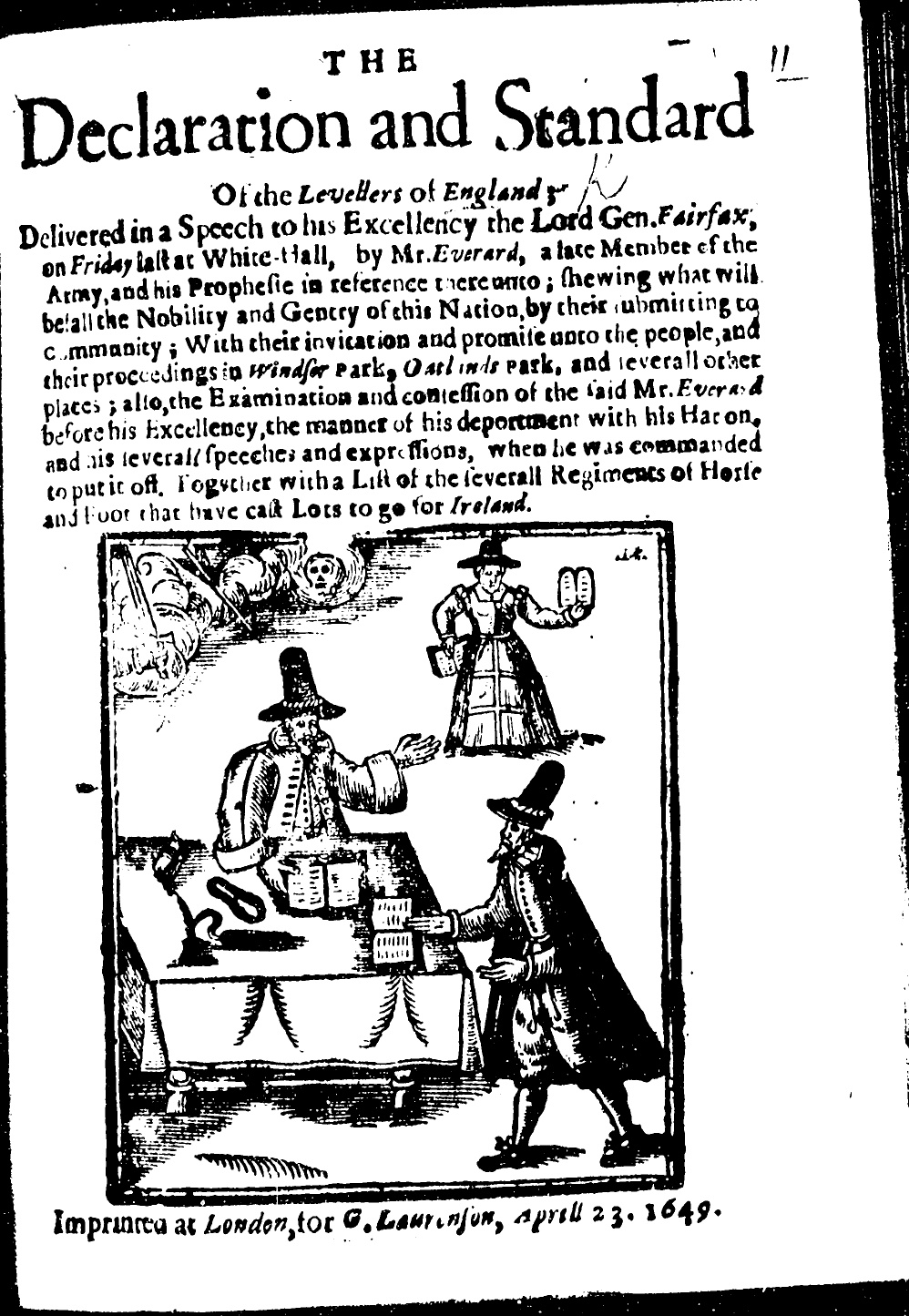
Woodcut from a Diggers document by William Everard

Thomas Müntzer led a large Anabaptist communist movement during the German Peasants' War. Engels' analysis of Thomas Müntzer work in and the wider German Peasants' War lead Marx and Engels to conclude that the communist revolution, when it occurred, would be led not by a peasant army but by an urban proletariat.

In the 16th century, English writer Sir Thomas More portrayed a society based on common ownership of property in his treatise Utopia, whose leaders administered it through the application of reason. Several groupings in the English Civil War supported this idea, but especially the Diggers who espoused communistic and agrarian ideals. Oliver Cromwell and the Grandees' attitude to these groups was at best ambivalent and often hostile. Engels considered the Levellers of the English Civil War as a group representing the proletariat fighting for a utopian socialist society. Though later commentators have viewed the Levellers as a bourgeois group that did not seek a socialist society.

During the Age of Enlightenment in 18th century France, some liberal writers increasingly began to criticize the institution of private property even to the extent they demanded its abolition. Such writings came from thinkers such as the deeply religious philosopher Jean-Jacques Rousseau. In his hugely influential The Social Contract (1762) Rousseau outlined the basis for a political order based on popular sovereignty rather than the rule of monarchs, and in his Discourse on Inequality (1755) inveighed against the corrupting effects of private property claiming that the invention of private property had led to the, "crimes, wars, murders, and suffering" that plagued civilization. Raised a Calvinist, Rousseau was influenced by the Jansenist movement within the Roman Catholic Church. The Jansenist movement originated from the most orthodox Roman Catholic bishops who tried to reform the Roman Catholic Church in the 17th century to stop secularization and Protestantism. One of the main Jansenist aims was democratizing to stop the aristocratic corruption at the top of the Church hierarchy.

Victor d'Hupay's 1779 work Project for a Philosophical Community described a plan for a communal experiment in Marseille where all private property was banned. d'Hupay referred to himself as a communiste, the French form of the word "communist", in a 1782 letter, the first recorded instance of that term.

=== North America ===
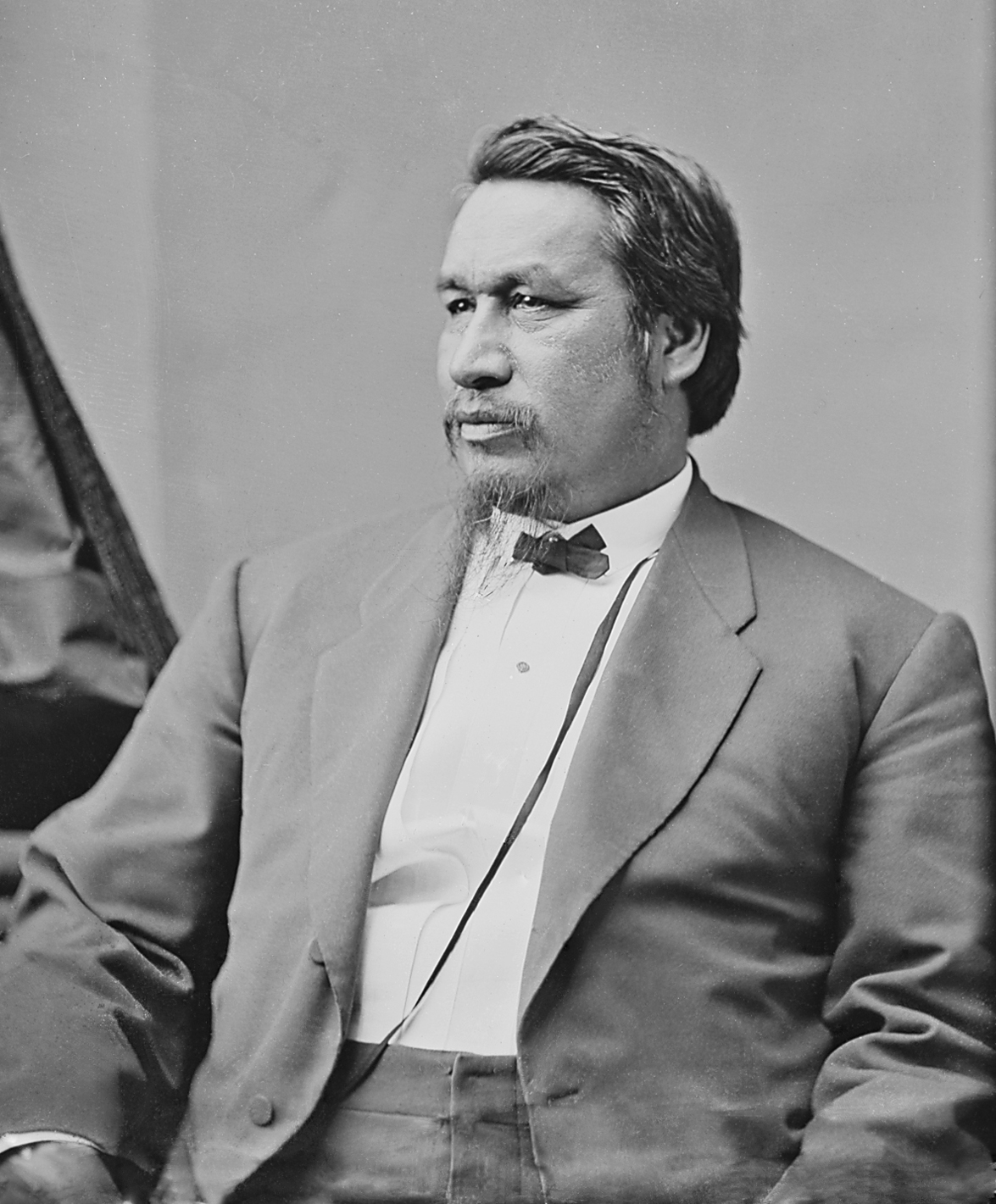
Ely S. Parker, co-author of The League of the Ho-dé-no-sau-nee or Iroquois

Lewis Henry Morgan's descriptions of "communism in living" as practiced by the Haudenosaunee of North America, through research enabled by and coauthored with Ely S. Parker, were viewed as a form of pre-Marxist communism. Morgan's works were a primary inspiration for Marx and Engel's description of primitive communism, and has led to some believing that early communist-like societies also existed outside of Europe, in Native American society and other pre-Colonized societies in the Western hemisphere. Though the belief of primitive communism as based on Morgan's work is flawed due to Morgan's misunderstandings of Haudenosaunee society and his, since proven wrong, theory of social evolution. This, and subsequent more accurate research, has led to the society of the Haudenosaunee to be of interest in communist and anarchist analysis. Particularly aspects where land was not treated as a commodity, communal ownership and near non-existent rates of crime.

Primitive communism meaning societies that practiced economic cooperation among the members of their community, where almost every member of a community had their own contribution to society and land and natural resources would often be shared peacefully among the community. Some such communities in North America and South America still existed well into the 20th century. Historian Barry Pritzker lists the Acoma, Cochiti and Isleta Puebloans as living in socialist-like societies. It is assumed modern egalitarianism seen in Pueblo communities stems from this historic socio-economic structure. David Graeber has also commented that the Inuit have practiced communism and fended off unjust hierarchy for "thousands of years".

== Age of Revolution ==
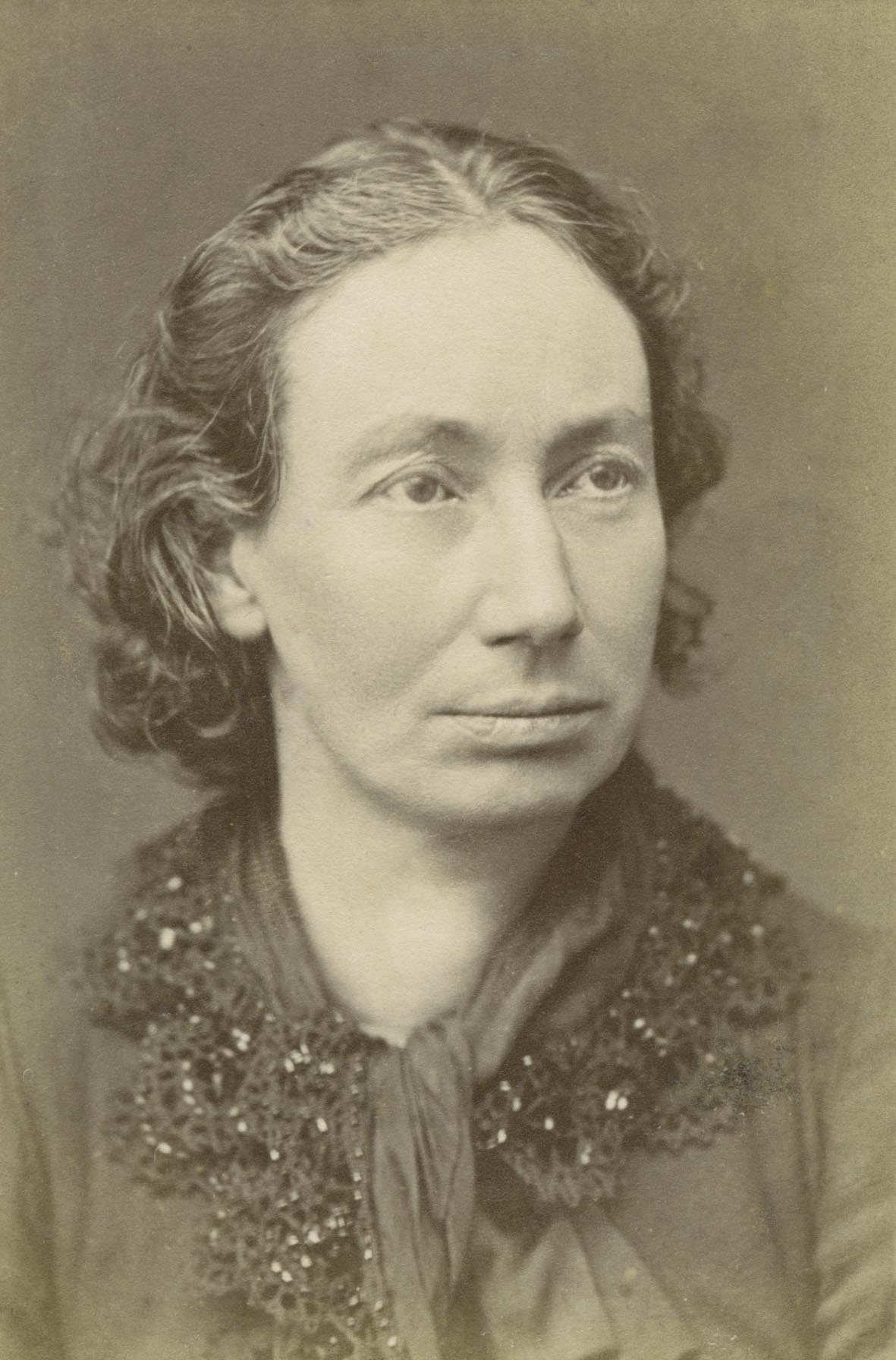
Louise Michel, a communard who supported the 1878 Kanak insurrection whilst exiled from France.

The Shakers of the 18th century under Joseph Meacham developed and practiced their own form of communalism, as a sort of religious communism, where property had been made a "consecrated whole" in each Shaker community.

Many Pre-Marx socialists lived, developed, and published their works and theories during this period from the late 18th century to the mid 19th century, including: Charles Fourier, Louis Blanqui, Pierre-Joseph Proudhon, Pierre Leroux, Thomas Hodgskin, Claude Henri de Saint-Simon, Wilhelm Weitling, and Étienne Cabet. Utopian socialist writers such as Robert Owen are also sometimes regarded as communists. The use of the term "communism" in English was popularised by advocates of Owenism.

The currents of thought in French philosophy from the Enlightenment from Rousseau and d'Hupay proved influential during the French Revolution of 1789 in which various anti-monarchists, particularly the Jacobins, supported the idea of redistributing wealth equally among the people, including Jean-Paul Marat and Francois Babeuf. The latter was involved in the Conspiracy of the Equals of 1796 intending to establish a revolutionary regime based on communal ownership, egalitarianism and the redistribution of property. Babeuf was directly influenced by Morelly's anti-property utopian novel The Code of Nature and quoted it extensively, although he was under the erroneous impression it was written by Diderot. Also during the revolution the publisher Nicholas Bonneville, the founder of the Parisian revolutionary Social Club used his printing press to spread the communist treatises of Restif and Sylvain Maréchal. Maréchal, who later joined Babeuf's conspiracy, would state it his Manifesto of the Equals (1796), "we aim at something more sublime and more just, the COMMON GOOD or the COMMUNITY OF GOODS" and "The French Revolution is just a precursor of another revolution, far greater, far more solemn, which will be the last." Restif also continued to write and publish books on the topic of communism throughout the Revolution. Accordingly, through their egalitarian programs and agitation Restif, Maréchal, and Babeuf became the progenitors of modern communism. Babeuf's plot was detected, however, and he and several others involved were arrested and executed. Because of his views and methods, Babeuf has been described as an anarchist, communist and a socialist by later scholars. The word communism was first used in English by Goodwyn Barmby in a conversation with those he described as the "disciples of Babeuf". Despite the setback of the loss of Babeuf, the example of the French Revolutionary regime and Babeuf's doomed insurrection was an inspiration for French socialist thinkers such as Henri de Saint-Simon, Louis Blanc, Charles Fourier and Pierre-Joseph Proudhon. Proudhon, the founder of modern anarchism and libertarian socialism would later famously declare "property is theft!" a phrase first invented by the French revolutionary Brissot de Warville.

Maximilien Robespierre and his Reign of Terror, aimed at exterminating the monarchy, nobility, clergy, conservatives and nationalists was admired among some anarchists, communists and socialists. In his turn, Robespierre was a great admirer of Voltaire and Rousseau.

By the 1830s and 1840s in France, the egalitarian concepts of communism and the related ideas of socialism had become widely popular in revolutionary circles thanks to the writings of social critics and philosophers such as Pierre Leroux and Théodore Dézamy, whose critiques of bourgeois liberalism and individualism led to a widespread intellectual rejection of laissez-faire capitalism on economic, philosophical and moral grounds. According to Leroux writing in 1832, "To recognise no other aim than individualism is to deliver the lower classes to brutal exploitation. The proletariat is no more than a revival of antique slavery." He also asserted that private ownership of the means of production allowed for the exploitation of the lower classes and that private property was a concept divorced from human dignity. It was only in the year 1840 that proponents of common ownership in France, including the socialists Théodore Dézamy, Étienne Cabet, and Jean-Jacques Pillot began to widely adopt the word "communism" as a term for their belief system. Those inspired by Étienne Cabet created the Icarian movement, setting up communities based on non-religious communal ownership in various states across the US, the last of which disbanded in 1898.

The participants of the Taiping Rebellion are viewed by the Chinese Communist Party as proto-communists. Marx referred to the communist tendencies in the Taiping Rebellion as "Chinese socialism".

The Communards and the Paris Commune are often seen as proto-communists, and had significant influence on Marx, who described it as an example of the "dictatorship of the proletariat".

== See also ==
- History of socialism
