= Grenelle camp affair =

Event in the French Revolution

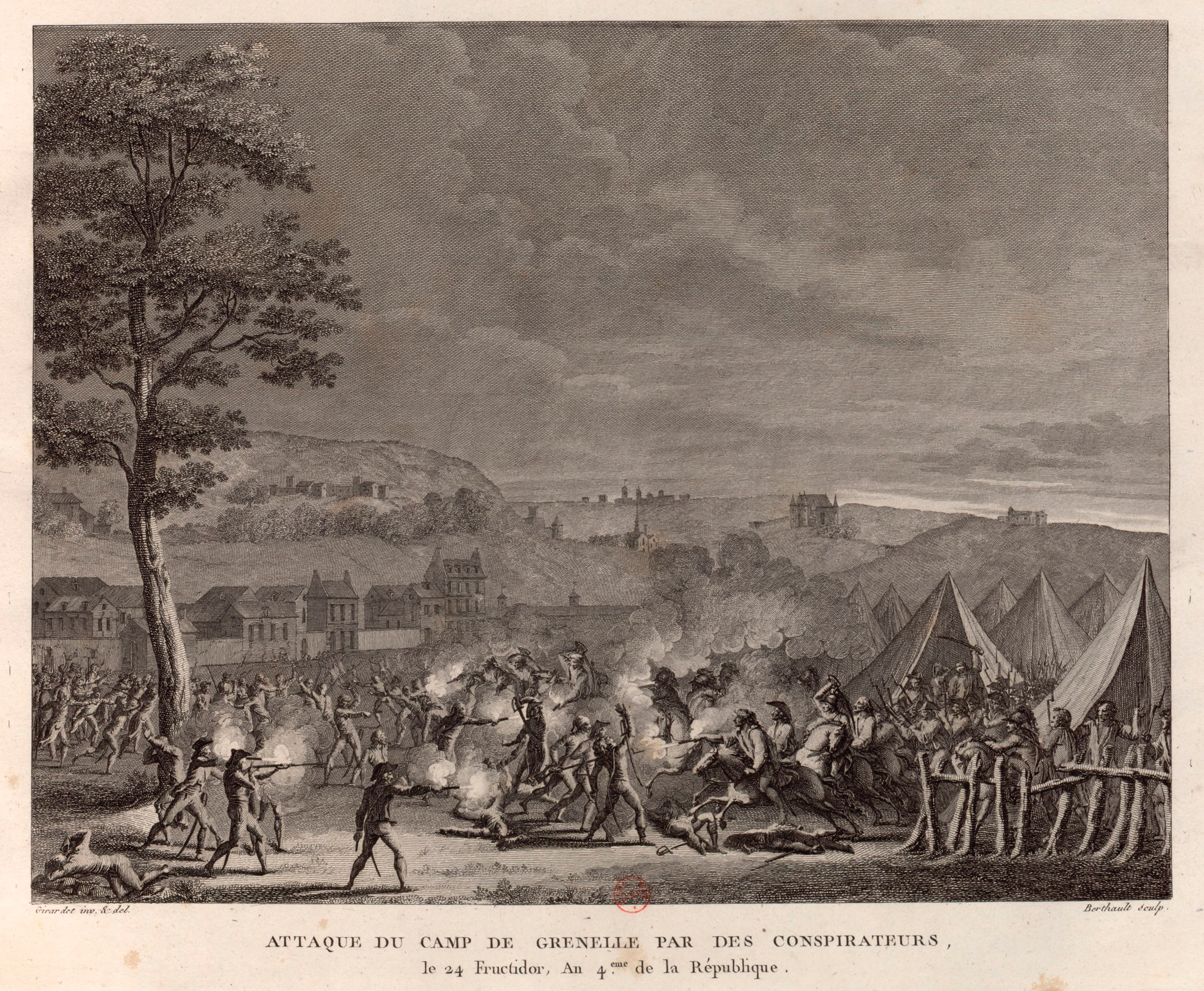
Attack on the Grenelle camp

The Grenelle camp affair was an event of the French Revolution which occurred under the Directory, on the night of 9 to 10 September 1796.

== Background ==
The affair was the decisive episode in the Conspiracy of the Equals led by Gracchus Babeuf. Advocating agrarian communism, he prepared a plot with a number of Montagnards. After the failure of the Insurrection of 12 Germinal Year III and the Revolt of 1 Prairial Year III (1 April and 20 May 1795), Babeuf abandoned the strategy of inciting a popular uprising.

On 10 May 1796, Babeuf and the members of the Conspiracy of the Equals were arrested. Faced with the repression that then fell on Parisian democratic circles, several of his associates tried to provoke an uprising, first within the Police Legion and then, after its dissolution on 13 Floréal Year III (May 2, 1795), among the soldiers of the 21st Dragoon Regiment, who were camped at Grenelle.

Already responsible for the arrest of Babeuf and his comrades, the double agent fr: Georges Grisel was at the origin of the police plot prior to the Grenelle affair. Perhaps warned by Grisel, Lazare Carnot is said to have warned Malo, the unit commander. According to other sources it was in fact Malo who warned Carnot, who decided to take advantage of the situation to get rid of the last remaining Jacobins.

== Attempted uprising ==
200 to 500 conspirators arrived at the camp on the night of 23 to 24 Fructidor (9 to 10 September). They were met with gunfire, leaving around twenty dead and many wounded. 132 conspirators were captured in the camp and the surrounding area.

Among the directors, while Carnot and Étienne-François Letourneur were organizing the defense of the Luxembourg Palace against an expected attack, Paul Barras is said to have helped some of his compromised friends to flee. As for La Révellière-Lépeaux, then president of the Directory, he was not informed until the last moment, and Reubell left for his country house in Arcueil.

== Repression, trials and executions ==
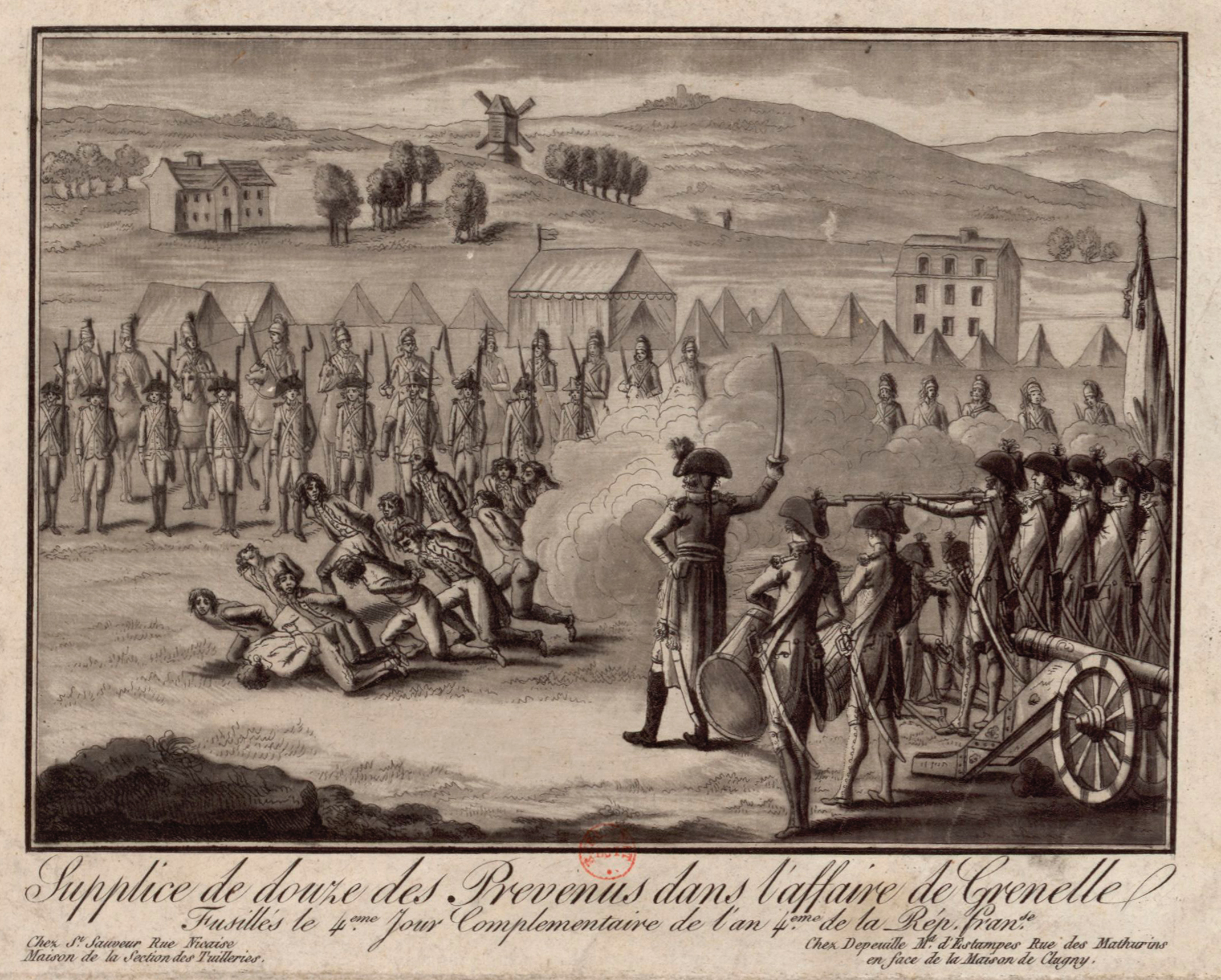
Execution of twelve men convicted of their part in the uprising.

The Directory decided on a campaign of merciless repression. On 24 Fructidor, the Council of 500 and the Council of Ancients voted for a law modifying the existing law of 22 Messidor (12 July) and allowing the use of the measures of 30 Prairial Year III (18 June 1795), which had originally been adopted to counter the Vendéen and the Chouan rebels captured under arms. Consequently, the Grenelle prisoners were brought before a military tribunal.

In Vendémiaire year V (October 1796), the tribunal, meeting at the Temple, pronounced about thirty death sentences, although sources differ on the number of convictions and the names of those condemned. Those executed included General fr:Maximilien Henri Nicolas Jacob. Contrary to the Fructidor law, which allowed an appeal to the court of cassation, thirty of the condemned were shot without delay. Two others were sentenced in absentia, and another committed suicide. Three former members of the National Convention, Javogues, Cusset and Huguet were among those shot, as well as the former mayor of Lyon Bertrand and several former revolutionary commissioners.

On 22nd of Germinal (11 April 1797), the Court of Cassation annulled the other convictions. Sent before the Criminal Court of the Seine, all were acquitted.
