= Lamarliere =

Lamarliere may refer to:

- Jean Geneau de Lamarlière, mayor of Warvillers, France
- Antoine Nicolas Collier, Comte de La Marlière (1745–1793), French Army officer and Republican General during the Wars of the French Revolution
