= Pierre Joseph Duhem =

French physician and politician

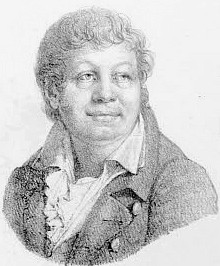
- Born: 8 July 1758; Lille, France
- Died: 24 March 1807 (aged 48); Mainz, (Mont-Tonnerre French department) now Germany
- Education: Medicine
- Known for: Committee of General Security member
- Title: National Convention member
- Political party: Montagnard
- Board member of: Panthéon Club

Pierre Joseph Duhem (8 July 1758 – 24 March 1807) was a French physician and politician.

== Early years ==
Son of a weaver, he was born in Lille. He was study supervisor in the Collège d'Anchin (fr), in Douai, then he obtained his medical doctorate and practised medicine in Quesnoy-sur-Deûle and in the Douai Hospital.

== Career in Legislative Assembly ==
Strong supporter and advocate of revolutionary ideas, he became one of the founder members of the Société des amis de la Constitution (Jacobins) (11 November 1789), elected justice of the peace in Lille in 1790, then elected North member of parliament (MP) to Legislative Assembly in September 1791 where he sat on the left. On 17 November 1791, he gained attention in Assembly by giving a violent speech against non-juring priests. He wanted the confinement of War Ministry Narbonne-Lara but was disapproved by other MP. Throughout that period, Duhem carried out active propaganda for republican ideas in the streets, the Assembly and the sections. He played a role in the insurrection of 10 August and, during the night of 10–11 August, he presented the decrees suspending the King and calling for a National Convention. On 20 August 1792, he required to publish a decree concerning General Dillon who "lost the confidence of the nation". On 21 August, he was elected secretary of the National Assembly, then sent on a mission to the Army of the North where he reported that Maubeuge was threatened by foreign armies.

== The National Convention member ==
In September 1792, he was elected again to the National Convention as North MP. He joined the Mountain and was sent again on a mission to the Army of the North. On 26 December 1792, he requested a removal measure against the Interior Minister Roland accused of destroying some of the evidence within the armoire de fer (iron chest) found in the Tuileries Palace, containing documents that indicated Louis XVI's relations with corrupt politicians. He demanded a roll-call vote for the trial of Louis XVI. He asked for death sentence without suspensions against the King. The day of the execution, he joined the Committee of General Security where he sat until June. He took advantage of his position to be resolutely opposed to Girondists and led an armed raid on the printing establishment of Antoine Joseph Gorsas on 9 March 1793. From 4 April to 20 July 1793, he was sent again on a mission to the North Army and he denounced the Girondist Charles Zachée Varlet (fr) but he supported suspected Generals as Custine and La Marlière against Jacobins as General Jean-Baptiste de Lavalette whom he dismissed. But Robespierre and Jean Bon Saint-André took the side of Lavalette and Duhem became himself somewhat suspect. On 12 December 1793, Robespierre delivered a speech supporting dismissed Mountain Generals. Duhem was excluded from the club 4 days later. To save his head, he was never heard again until 9 Thermidor.

== The insurrection of 12 Germinal, Year III ==
Under the Thermidorian regime, Duhem belonged to the group of remaining Montagnards and went after Fréron and Tallien. Rather he stood up for Barère, Collot d'Herbois and Billaud-Varenne accused of terrorism.

Close to the last sans-culottes, he was unable during the insurrection of 12 Germinal, Year III, to reconstruct the bands which in the past had insured the success of the journees. Arrested, he was imprisoned in Ham, then in Sedan but avoided trial.

Released under the December 1795 amnesty, he joined the North Army as physician.

Nevertheless, he remained politically involved and supported the main neo-jacobin movement during Directory as a member of the Panthéon Club. Dismissed in 1797, he was reinstated through the coup of 18 Fructidor. In 1798, he was accused of apologising for "the martyrs of the revolt of 1 Prairial Year III".

== Late career ==
Transferred to the Italy Army, then to the West Army, he was posted to the military hospital in Mainz (Mont-Tonnerre French department) in 1802.

Pierre Joseph Duhem died in Mainz in 1807 at the age of 48.

== Sources ==
- Jean-René Suratteau; Albert Soboul; François Gendron (2005). Dictionnaire historique de la Révolution française (in French). Quadrige/PUF. ISBN 978-2-13-053605-5.
- François Xavier de Feller (1829). Supplément au Dictionnaire historique des grands hommes: Aarhusius-Gyllenborg (in French). Rolland. p. 362.
