= The Manifesto of the Equals =

French insurgent polemic written in 1796

- Original title: Le Manifeste des Égaux
- Genre: Manifesto
- Publication date: 1796
- Publication place: French First Republic

The Manifesto of the Equals (French: Le Manifeste des Égaux) was a document written in 1796 and recited at a meeting of the Society of the Panthéon, a political group that sought to challenge the new repressive government of France and the Constitution of 1795. This group championed radical leftist ideals of 'perfect equality' and 'communal happiness' over everything.

The authorship of the Manifesto is attributed to a radical atheist, journalist, and playwright named Sylvain Maréchal. However, it is commonly suspected that the document had multiple authors. One man that Maréchal worked closely with was the political journalist François-Noël Babeuf (Gracchus Babeuf). Babeuf (whose ideologies are now referred to as Babouvism) is often referred to as the leader of the Conspiracy of the Equals. The letter was a failed insurrection that attempted to combat the undemocratic policies of the new government, which included limiting voting rights, and banning the right to assembly and free expression. Despite the political failure of this coup d'état, which ended with the conviction and execution of several of its participants, including Babeuf, it did have significant ideological impact on the history of France and socialist ideals. The Manifesto in particular was very influential as the first political manifesto. It was written not just as a theory or declaration, but as a relatable and public response to the perceived failure of the existing constitutions and legal documents. The Manifesto, addressed to the "PEOPLE OF FRANCE!", proclaimed the need to remove the revolution from legal procedure, establish greater communal equality, and abolish capitalist ideas like private property. Ultimately, this was intended to continue revolution and incite tremendous political change.

== Authorship and context ==
Sylvain Maréchal was born in 1750 and died in 1803. Maréchal was a radical atheist and vehement critic of Christianity, as evidenced in his parody of the Bible, Livre échappé du déluge (1784). Considering it to be an instrument used by governments to exploit the masses economically and socially, Maréchal was for the dissolution of the Church and positions of priesthood which he believed could be replaced with virtue and reason. His strongest ideals and ideologies can be found in his writing, used as a means to counter and criticise the reformed ideals of the Republic, especially during the late eighteenth century. In 1780, he replaced the saints on the Catholic calendar with scholars and writers, naming this book Almanach des honnêtes gens and consequently being imprisoned for three months. He was also an editor of Les Révolutions de Paris, considered as the most radical newspaper in the eighteenth century. His writing was and still is to the present day considered a precursor to anarchy and communism, whilst his critical stance against the 'bourgeois Republic' led to his involvement with the prominent François-Noël Babeuf and other members of the revolutionist circle belonging to the Conspiracy of the Equals.

After the fall of Robespierre, a period of authority by the Directory ensued which decreased the pace of the revolution and reversed some of the advances that had already been established as a result of the Revolution. In July 1794, the Convention established a committee to draft a new constitution, replacing the radical constitution of 1793 (Year I) and its most radical propositions, such as the right to work. In the Constitution of 1795 (Year III), a five-man Directory with executive powers was introduced which refocused property rights to only wealthy property owners and prioritised executive authority to these five candidates. Moreover, the Directory suppressed suspected royalist and Jacobin uprisings in Paris by forbidding the gathering and production of a public assembly and any words written to overturn the Constitution of 1795, using them as an opportunity to limit freedoms and take control. In response to the Directory's prosecutions and regulations to close down all communication channels enabling a legal anti-government opposition, a community of atheist and socialist revolutionaries gathered, emphasising the people's rights for economic equality and the redistribution of property.

This community was then founded as Le Tribun du Peuple by Babeuf, who, after being released from prison six months after March in 1795, was proclaimed the leader of the Society of the Panthéon, a secret society of former Jacobins who met in the crypt of the Abbey of Saint Genevieve. As the freedom of expression started to be perceived as antagonism against the state rather than 'an open and legal agitation for political reform', a debate of whether one had the right to assemble and debate opinions contrary to the rules of the state became the central issue in the relationship between the state and the writer under the Directory. And as the Directory increasingly started to deem literature and other forms of writing that were interpreted as opposing the rules of the state, a new kind of journalism was founded by candidates who acted upon the radical theory of the unfinished French Revolution and aimed for the political emancipation of the Directory, called 'revolutionary manifesto'. It was called a 'Manifesto' because, as deciphered by its Latin etymology manus ("hand"), it indicates that it is something palpable, that it can be touched and apprehended by everyone. To continue the radical contradiction against the traditional mannerism of French aristocracy, this genre derived its function from the customary act of kings and princes who would publish a manifesto to make clear their reasons for action by reproducing this into a concept of public reasoning as a public manifestation, 'an assembling of the people before the truth'. This insurgent genre became a safe haven for artists and critics to openly question the relationship between the reality of the revolutionary state and the optimistic vision of the national revolution, as manifested in the Manifesto of the Equals, written in 1796, which was thought to be predominantly written by Maréchal. Unsurprisingly, Maréchal was involved in the composition of the Manifesto of the Equals because for him, as long as the distinctions of birth, social rank, education and occupation remained the primary defining feature of civilian life, the Revolution remained unfinished. The Manifesto of the Equals was the first ever political manifesto that could be manifested into a public vision, a radical piece of writing which was not a declaration nor a set of regulations. Not only is it a truth that openly and explicitly presented itself as a reaction, as a counter-text against all constitutions and laws (especially the aristocratic charters of 1791 and 1795), it was the significant polemic against the bourgeois constitutions of the French Republic. Although it is believed that Maréchal is the sole author of the Manifesto, historians have nevertheless underlined the possibility that other fellow revolutionaries were involved in its production (such as Babeuf) due to the fact that this piece was composed during the increasing persecution of anti-government writers as worthy of the death penalty by the state and thus had to be written under the utter secrecy of the Conspiracy of the Equals, in which both Maréchal and Babeuf were involved in.

== Summary ==
Sylvain Maréchal first and foremost calls for equality. He argues that equality has never existed in its purest form and it is now time for the citizens of France to establish this. After the Revolution of 1789, Maréchal argues that legislation had not gone far enough to establish true equality among the citizens of France. Equality should be manifested in every aspect of life, not simply written in the Declaration of the Rights of Man. He expresses that the Revolution of 1789 is only a precursor to another, major revolution which would truly shake off the shackles of the Ancien Régime. Maréchal aims to ‘continue the revolution’ with this speech, by collectivising land and the means of production. Therefore, there would be no rulers, no servants. Even art is to be sacrificed if in the name of ‘true equality’. Maréchal's goal for this revolution is expressed towards the end of the speech: to establish a Republic of Equals.

== Legacy and reception ==
Though most popular in Paris, similarly radical arguments were mentioned occasionally in the surrounding provinces. The French Directory even ordered the dismissal and disarmament of the police on 2 May 1796, as Babouvist ideas were supposedly popular amongst the police. After Babeuf's arrest on 10 May 1796, many members of the Conspiracy of the Equals, and potential co-authors of the Manifesto, were arrested and executed for their radical ideas.

Although the Manifesto of the Equals was largely ignored at its time of writing and the conspiracy failed, it 'later came to be seen as the founding text of modern socialism', anarchist, and communist ideologies. Friedrich Engels and Karl Marx even recognised the Conspiracy of the Equals as 'the first appearance of a truly active communist party'. The Manifesto set a precedent for radical revolutionary thought. It was taken as proof that individual revolutions held importance in the buildup towards a great revolution in the future.

The Conspiracy and the Manifesto of the Equals radically detached revolution from legal mechanisms. This was because Babeuf and Maréchal saw revolution as distinct from the state, and structures of power. The Manifesto also prioritised economic equality over liberty and freedom.
