= Conspiracy of the Equals =

1796 conspiracy to overthrow the Directory by Babeuf

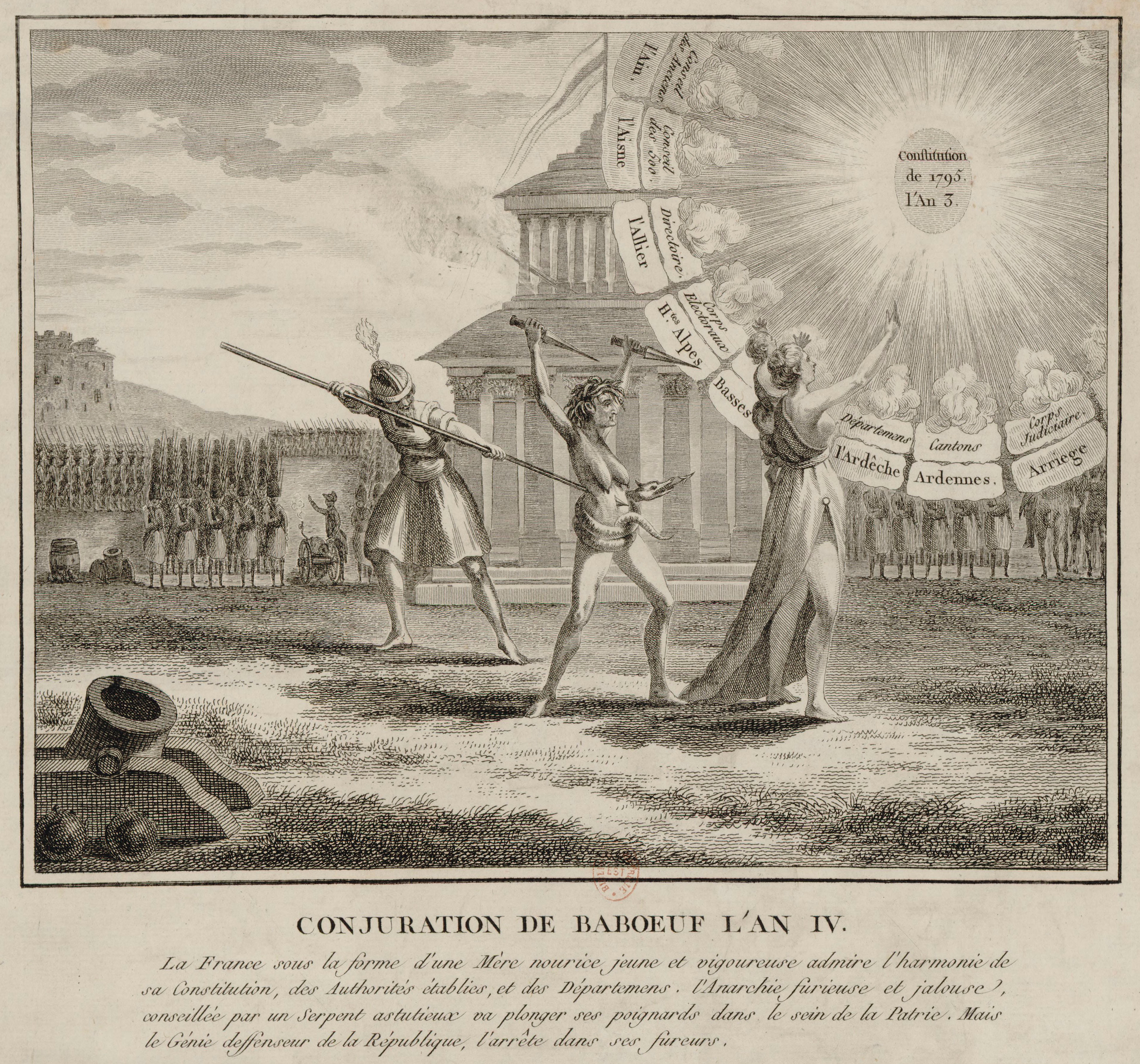
- A 1796 engraving, denigrating the conspiracy (1796)
- Native name: Conjuration des Égaux
- Date: May 1796
- Location: French First Republic
- Type: Political plot
- Cause: Dissatisfaction with the Directory
- Organised by: François-Noël Babeuf; Philippe Buonarroti; Sylvain Maréchal
- Outcome: Conspiracy discovered and repressed
- Arrests: 245 presumed conspirators
- Sentence: Capital punishment

The Conspiracy of the Equals (French: Conjuration des Égaux) of May 1796 was a failed coup d'etat during the French Revolution. It was led by François-Noël Babeuf, who wanted to overthrow the Directory and replace it with an egalitarian and proto-socialist republic, inspired by Jacobin ideals.

== Background ==
It was the attempts of the Directory to deal with the economic crisis that gave Babeuf his historical importance. The new government was pledged to abolish the system by which Paris was fed at the expense of all France, and the cessation of the distribution of bread and meat at nominal prices was fixed for 20 February 1796. The announcement caused the most widespread consternation. Not only were the workmen and the large class of proletarians attracted to Paris by the system, but rentiers and government officials, whose incomes were paid in assignats on a scale arbitrarily fixed by the government, saw themselves threatened with starvation. The government yielded to the outcry; but the expedients by which it sought to mitigate the evil, notably the division of those entitled to relief into classes, only increased the alarm and discontent.

The universal misery gave point to virulent attacks by Babeuf on the existing order, and gained him a hearing. He gathered around him a small circle of followers known as the Societé des égaux, soon merged with the rump of the Jacobin Club, who met at the Panthéon; and in November 1795 he was reported by the police to be openly preaching "insurrection, revolt, and the constitution of 1793".

Seven men joined Babeuf to direct the conspiracy: Philippe Buonarroti, Augustin Alexandre Darthé, Sylvain Maréchal (who was in charge of writing The Manifesto of the Equals), Félix Lepeletier, Pierre-Antoine Antonelle, Debon, and Georges Grisel. A network of military agents was created by Jean Antoine Rossignol, who placed revolutionary agents in every district of Paris.

Philippe Buonarroti’s works L’analyse de la Doctrine de Babouf and La response a M.V. both demonstrate why he can be considered "the major theoretician and ideologue of the Equals movement". Buonarroti believed that taking any political stance implied even taking action. He was one of the major exponents of Leftism at the end of the 18th Century, in France. Babeuf and he were both inside Plessis Jail in 1797. Buonarroti shared Babeuf’s principles about private property and advocated for an equally distributed and collaborative social scheme in France. He also believed that Italy was not ready yet for such a social reform.

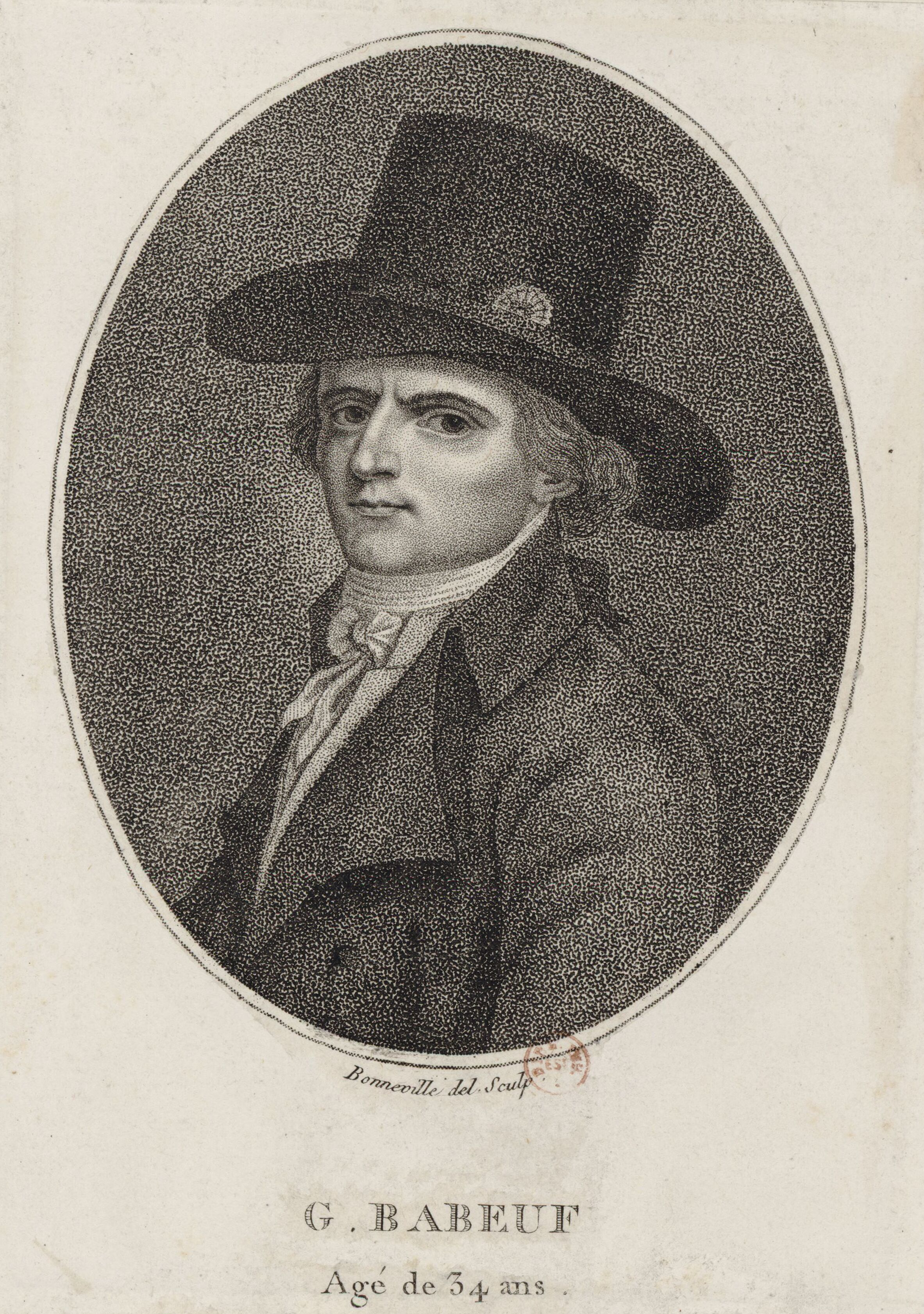
Gracchus Babeuf

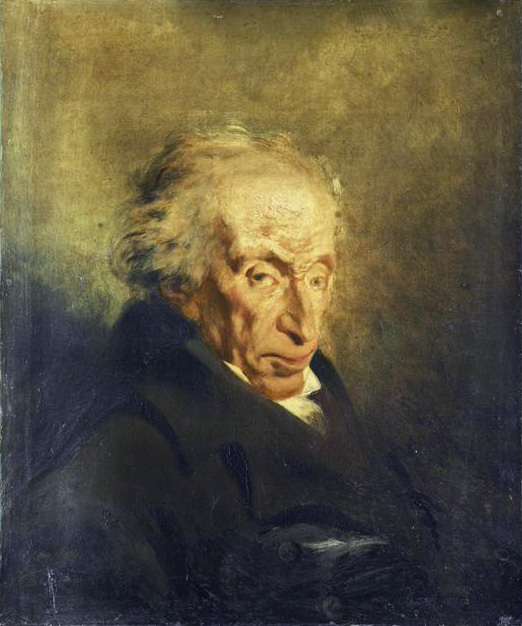
Philippe Buonarroti

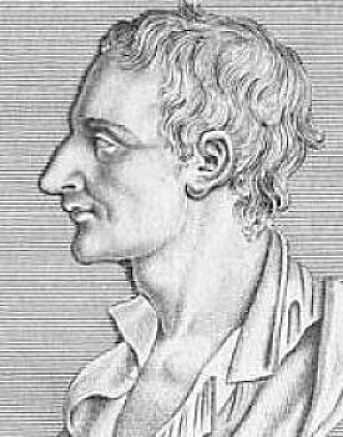
Sylvain Maréchal

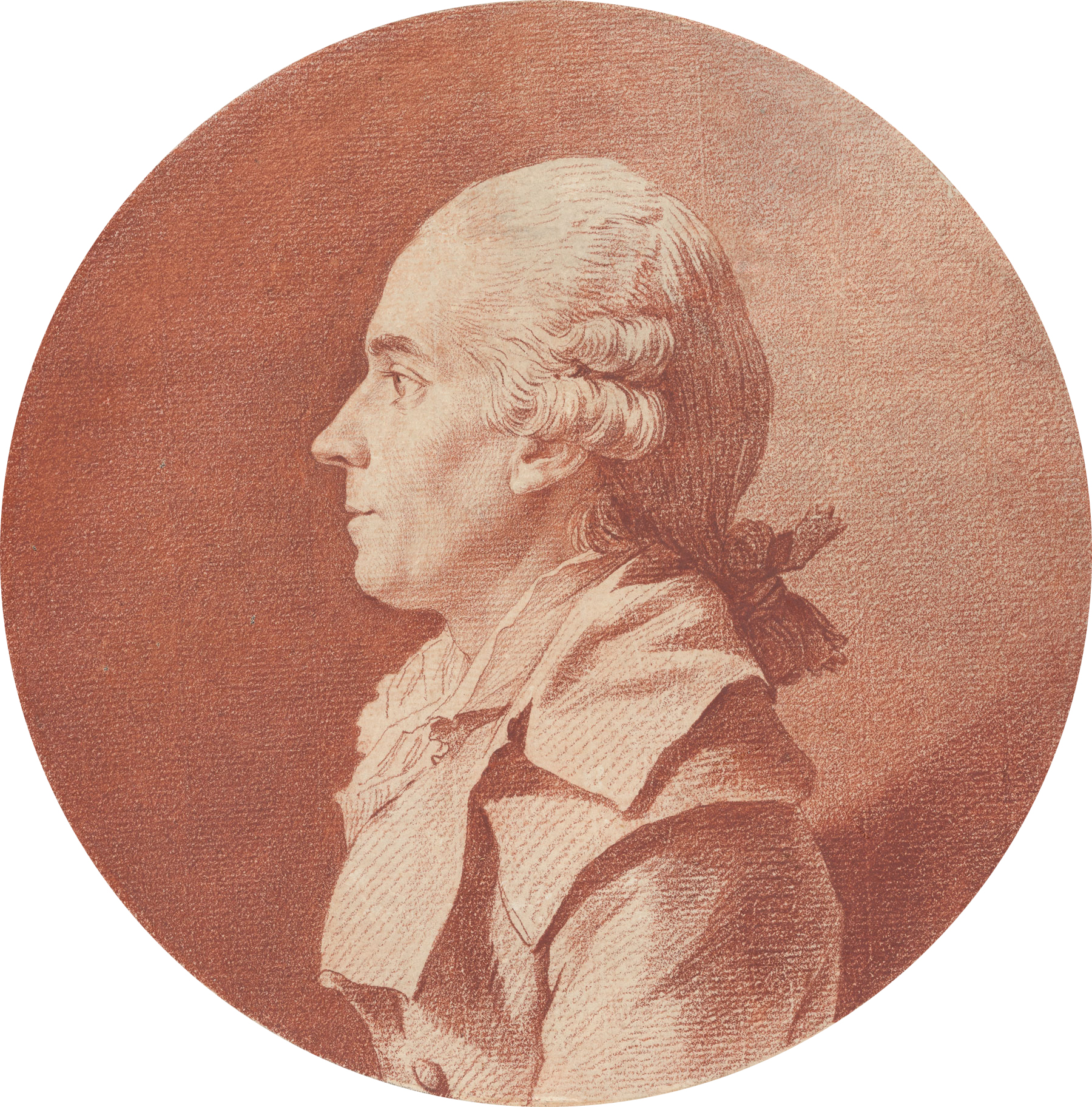
Félix Lepeletier

== Ideas of the Conspiracy ==
The ultimate goal of François-Noël Babeuf and his comrades was absolute equality. The purpose of the Conspiracy was to continue revolution and to lead it to the collectivisation of lands and the means of production to ‘put an end to civil dissension and public poverty.’ They furthermore demanded the application of the Constitution of Year 1 (dating from 1793, the first constitution of the Republic, which was never applied).

The ideas of the Conspiracy were particularly set forth in The Manifesto of the Equals of 1796, which was written by Babeuf's top aide Sylvain Maréchal. The manifesto advocated a radical reform of France which went further than the French Revolution's Declaration of the Rights of Man and of the Citizen to enforce the practice of absolute equality across all aspects of society. Maréchal rejected the notion that equality before the law itself was sufficient to define societal equality, and thus placed a strong emphasis on the abolition of private property and equal access to food. The manifesto further denounced the privileged bourgeoisie who benefited from the Revolution such as the wealthy landowners who continued to profit off the ‘common good’ of land. Although the Conspiracy acknowledged the ‘selfish’ would oppose their aims to preserve their unjust privileges, their sacrifice of power was deemed necessary to enact real equality.

The Manifesto additionally reads: ‘We aspire to live and die equal, the way we were born: we want real equality or death; this is what we need. And we’ll have this real equality, at whatever the cost.’ However, the Conspiracy failed to include colonial slaves into their manifesto’s thinking, and only championed equality for those they considered the ‘People of France’.

The Manifesto was not met with unanimous support from the directors of the revolt. Maréchal’s point ‘Let the arts perish, if need be, as long as real equality remains’ was especially contested.

== Growth ==
For a time, the government, while keeping itself informed of his activities, left him alone. It suited the Directory to let the socialist agitation continue, in order to deter the people from joining in any royalist movement for the overthrow of the existing régime. Moreover the mass of the ouvriers, even of extreme views, were repelled by Babeuf's bloodthirstiness; and the police agents reported that his agitation was making many converts – for the government. The Jacobin Club refused to admit Babeuf and René-François Lebois, on the ground that they were "égorgeurs" ("throat-cutters").

With the development of the economic crisis, however, Babeuf's influence increased. After the Panthéon Club was closed by Napoleon Bonaparte on 27 February 1796, his aggressive activity redoubled. In Ventôse and Germinal (roughly late winter and early spring), he published, under the pen name of Lalande, soldat de la patrie, a new paper, the Eclaireur du Peuple, ou le Défenseur de Vingt-Cinq Millions d'Opprimés, which was hawked clandestinely from group to group in the streets of Paris.

At the same time, Issue 40 of the Tribun excited an immense sensation. In this, Babeuf praised the authors of the September Massacres as "deserving well of their country", and declared that a more complete "2 September" was needed to annihilate the actual government, which consisted of "starvers, bloodsuckers, tyrants, hangmen, rogues and mountebanks".

The distress among all classes continued, and in March, the attempt of the Directory to replace the assignats by a new issue of mandats created fresh dissatisfaction after the breakdown of the hopes first raised. A cry went up that national bankruptcy had been declared, and thousands of the lower class of ouvriers began to rally to Babeuf's flag. On 4 April 1796, the government received a report that 500,000 people in Paris were in need of relief. From 11 April, Paris was placarded with posters headed Analyse de la Doctrine de Baboeuf [sic], Tribun du Peuple, of which the opening sentence ran: "Nature has given to every man the right to the enjoyment of an equal share in all property", and which ended with a call to restore the Constitution of 1793.

The Arrondissements of Paris were thoroughly agitated by the propaganda of the Equals, and Babeuf's comrades no longer bothered to conceal their "seditious activity" in the eyes of the police. Babeuf's song Mourant de faim, mourant de froid ("Dying of Hunger, Dying of Cold"), set to a popular tune, began to be sung in the cafés, with immense applause; and reports circulated that the disaffected troops of the French Revolutionary Army in the camp of Grenelle were ready to join an insurrection against the government.

Philippe Buonarroti publicly read a draft decree proclaiming an egalitarian republic. The first words that were written declared: "The people advanced, tyranny is no more. You are free". This project predicted that "a large national community will be established in the republic". "Intestacy and inheritance will be abolished: all property currently owned by private individuals will, upon their death, fall to the national community. "The goods of the national community will be exploited collectively, by all its valid members. The national community will provide each of its members with decent accommodation, clothing, adequate food, and "relief in the art of healing." Finally, "the republic will no longer make money".

== Fall of the conspiracy ==
The conspiracy was denounced to the police for a fee, by one of its own leaders: Georges Grisel. Faced with the repression that then fell upon the democratic circles of Paris, several attempted to provoke an uprising, first within the police legion. The Directory considered that the Babouviste propaganda had dangerously agitated public opinion and, on May 2, 1796, it ordered the dismissal and disarmament of a police legion because: "seduced by the Babouviste faction they became more undisciplined every day." After its dissolution, the Babouvistes turned to the soldiers of the 21st Regiment of dragons, who were camped at Grenelle.

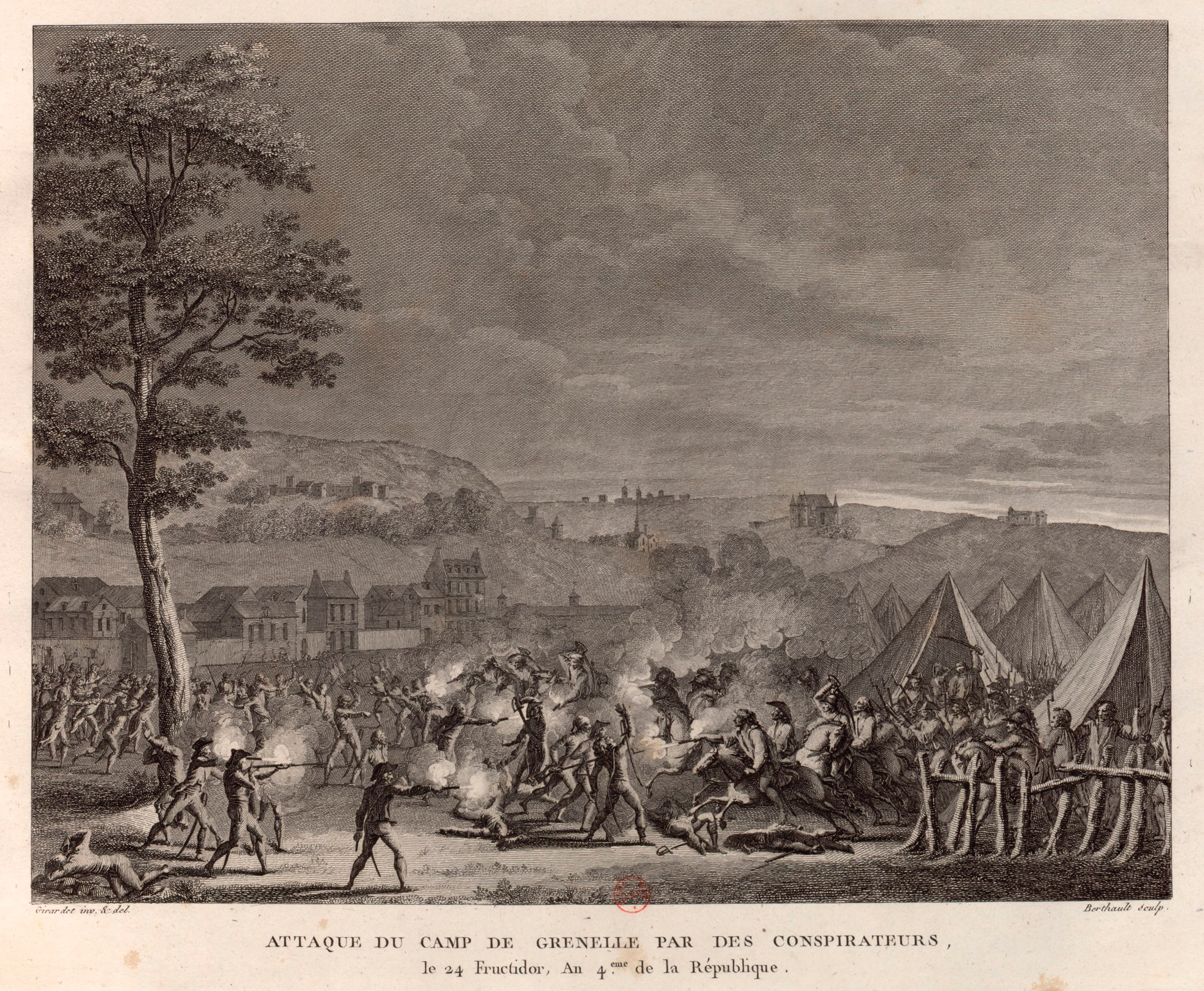
Depiction of the unrest in the military camp of Grenelle

The Directory thought it time to react; the bureau central had accumulated through its agents, notably the ex-captain Georges Grisel, who had been initiated into Babeuf's society, complete evidence of a conspiracy for an armed rising fixed for Floréal 22, year IV (11 May 1796), in which Jacobins and socialists were combined. On 10 May Babeuf, who had taken the pseudonym Tissot, was arrested; many of his associates were gathered by the police on order from Lazare Carnot: among them were Augustin Alexandre Darthé and Philippe Buonarroti, the ex-members of the National Convention, Robert Lindet, Jean-Pierre-André Amar, Marc-Guillaume Alexis Vadier and Jean-Baptiste Drouet, famous as the postmaster of Sainte-Menehould who had arrested Louis XVI during the latter's Flight to Varennes, and now a member of the Directory's Council of Five Hundred. 245 arrest warrants were issued by Carnot, who intended to stop demands for equality.

The government crackdown was extremely successful. The last number of the Tribun appeared on 24 April, although René-François Lebois, in the Ami du peuple, tried to incite soldiers to revolt. For a while there were rumours of a military rising.

The trial of Babeuf and his accomplices was fixed to take place before the newly constituted high court of justice at Vendôme. On Fructidor 10 and 11 (27 August and 28 August 1796), when the prisoners were removed from Paris, there were tentative efforts at a riot with a view to rescue, but these were easily suppressed. The attempt of five or six hundred Jacobins (7 September 1796) to rouse the soldiers at Grenelle met with no better success. A shootout greeted them, leaving about 20 dead, 132 captured and many others wounded.

The trial of Babeuf and the others, begun at Vendôme on 20 February 1797, lasted two months. The government, for reasons of its own, depicted the socialist Babeuf as the leader of the conspiracy, even though people more important than himself were implicated. His own vanity played admirably into their hands. And Darthé, who remained in utter silence during the debates, was accused of writing an order for the execution of the Directors. On Prairial 7 (26 May 1797) Babeuf and Darthé were condemned to death. On hearing his death sentence, Babeuf struck himself in the courtroom with several blows, and was carried dying the next day to the scaffold. Darthé, who had also tried to commit suicide, was guillotined alongside him on at Vendôme, Prairial 8 (27 May 1797), without appeal. Some of the prisoners, including Buonarroti and Germain, were deported; the rest, including Vadier and his fellow former-Montagnards, were acquitted. Drouet escaped, according to Paul Barras, with the connivance of the Directory.

== Legacy ==
The Conspiracy of the Equals would probably have disappeared in the flood of great events of the Revolution, but the publication in 1828 of Buonarroti's book, Conspiracy of the Equals, kept it in the history books. Friedrich Engels and Karl Marx recognized in the Conspiracy of the Equals "the first appearance of a truly active Communist party". Leon Trotsky would echo these sentiments, stating that the foundation of the Communist International marked a ‘carrying on in direct succession the heroic endeavours and martyrdom of a long line of revolutionary generations from Babeuf’.

The Conspiracy of the Equals can be seen as the first example of a form of French leftism distinct from that of the Jacobins, more focused upon material equality as opposed to abstract equality in the eyes of the law. Whereas the French Revolutionaries actively sought to guarantee property rights, a guarantee enshrined in the Declaration of the Rights of Man and of the Citizen, Babeuf and his followers desired instead the abolition of property entirely ('We lean towards something more sublime and more just: the common good or the community of property! No more individual property in land: the land belongs to no one. We demand, we want, the common enjoyment of the fruits of the land: the fruits belong to all.' This criticism of private property put forward by Babeuf and his fellow conspirators would go on to echo through later currents of French leftism: perhaps most pertinently in the thinking of Pierre-Joseph Proudhon, who famously declared 'Property is theft!'.

Although the words "anarchist" and "communist" did not exist at the time of the conspiracy, they have both been used to describe its ideas by later scholars. The English word "communism" was coined by Goodwyn Barmby in a conversation with those he described as the "disciples of Babeuf".
