= Jean-Baptiste de Lavalette =

- Louis Jean-Baptiste de Thomas de la Valette
- Born: 27 October 1753; Paris (France)
- Died: 28 July 1794 (aged 40) guillotined Paris (France)
- Military career
- Allegiance: France
- Rank: Brigadier general
- Unit: French National Guard (17th division)

Jean-Baptiste de Lavalette or Louis Jean-Baptiste de Lavalette or Louis Jean-Baptiste de Thomas de la Valette, Count of la Valette, was a former noble turned Robespierrist.

He was elected lieutenant colonel commanding the Lombards battalion in September 1792. He served as commanding officer, leader of popular society, military governor, and lieutenant colonel.

He was guillotined on 10 Thermidor Year II (28 July 1794) in the wake of Thermidorian Reaction, as a Hanriot assistant and a Robespierrist,

== Early life ==
Jean-Baptiste de Lavalette was born in Paris on 27 October 1753 from Joseph François de Thomas de la Valette (1729-1765) and Marie d'Alencé. He has two brothers and one sister:

- François Louis Clair de Thomas de la Valette (1750-1836), emigrated in 1789;
- François Joseph Elisabeth de Thomas de la Valette, guillotined in 1794;
- Marie Louise de Thomas de la Valette, emigrated with her family.

Garde de la Marine in 1769, Jean-Baptiste de Lavalette was on 1 June 1772 a second lieutenant in the 7th Cuirassier Regiment called then Royal-Etranger Cavalry Regiment. He gave up his army career in 1774 and married Henriette Élisabeth von Thurn und Taxis in Saint-Max on 12 November 1778 and had three children.

== French Revolutionary Wars ==
Firstly commanding officer of the National Guard in Nancy, he settled in Paris in September 1790. He was required by the municipality to gather volunteers for the revolutionary Lombards section in Paris. He became commandant of the Oratoire Battalion then of an armed section of the Gardes Françaises on 12 August 1792.

In September 1792, he was elected lieutenant colonel commanding the Lombards battalion, took part in the Argonne campaign then followed Durnouriez in Belgium.

Temporary commandant in Brussels during the French occupation, he was one of the leaders of the popular society. When the Belgian Primary Assemblies were convened concerning the decision to attach Belgium to France, he went to Ghent on 22 February 1793 to assist the Commissioner Courtois. As a result of their action, 2,000 Ghent citizens wished to attach Belgium to France.

He was assigned in Lille by Blaise Duval on 31 March 1793, appointed National Commissioner in Cambrai on 18 April to rally and retrain the troops from Belgium, then appointed temporary commandant of Cambrai by Dampierre in place of Claude Aubert (fr).

On 25 April 1793, he was appointed military governor of Lille. Promoted brigadier general in the Army of the Coasts of Brest on 15 May 1793, the Executive Council (fr) ordered him to stay in Lille to assist Favart (fr) in "operations having defence implications for this town by an officer who was already familiar with it, as a civic, energetic and militarily well-qualified partner". (Note: "toutes les opérations relatives à la défense de cette place par un officier qui la connaissait déjà, et sur le civisme, l'activité et les talents militaires duquel on pouvait compter")

Dismissed for a first time by Duhem and Lesage-Senault because of a dispute with the general Lamarlière, he was imprisoned for indiscipline. But Robespierre himself took the Lavalette case to the National Convention and the general was freed of the charges on 24 July.

Reinstated on 3 August, he reorganized the revolutionary army in Lille headed by Dufresse (fr). But on 9 December 1793 Bourdon de l'Oise criticized him before the National Convention for marrying a German emigrated princess and for denouncing patriots.

The two representatives on mission Hentz et Florent-Guiot (fr) wound up his army and placed Lavalette under provisional arrest. Then, on 18 December 1793, on request of Duhem, the Convention adopted a decree which ordered that he had to be transferred to Paris.

Thanks to Robespierre, on 23 Floréal (12 May 1794), the Committee of Public Safety adopted a decree which ordered his release and his reinstatement.

Lavalette asked to serve under Hanriot as a commander of a battalion of the French National Guard and joined the 17th division on 24 May 1794.
