= Pierre-Antoine Antonelle =

French politician, journalist

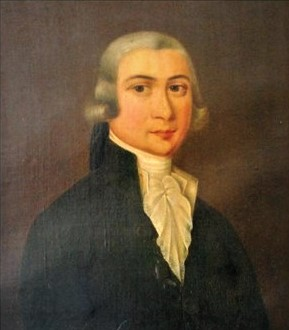
- Mayor of Arles, deputy

Mayor of Arles
- In office February 1790 – September 1791

Deputy of Bouches-du-Rhône and secretary
- In office 30 August 1791 – September 1792

Personal details
- Born: 17 July 1747 Arles, Provence, France
- Died: 26 November 1817 (aged 70) Arles, France
- Party: Jacobin
- Profession: Politician and Journalist

Pierre-Antoine Antonelle (17 July 1747 – 26 November 1817) was a French journalist, politician, president of the Jacobin Club and revolutionary. He was the first democratically elected mayor of Arles. Although he came from an aristocratic family, he was a strong supporter of the French Revolution, initially in the south of France, particularly Arles and Provence, and ultimately in Paris. Called the single most influential figure of the French Revolution in Arles, Antonelle was heavily involved in the reunion of the Comtat Venaissin with France and was one of the leading figures in Gracchus Babeuf's Conspiracy of the Equals.

== Biography ==
=== Early years ===
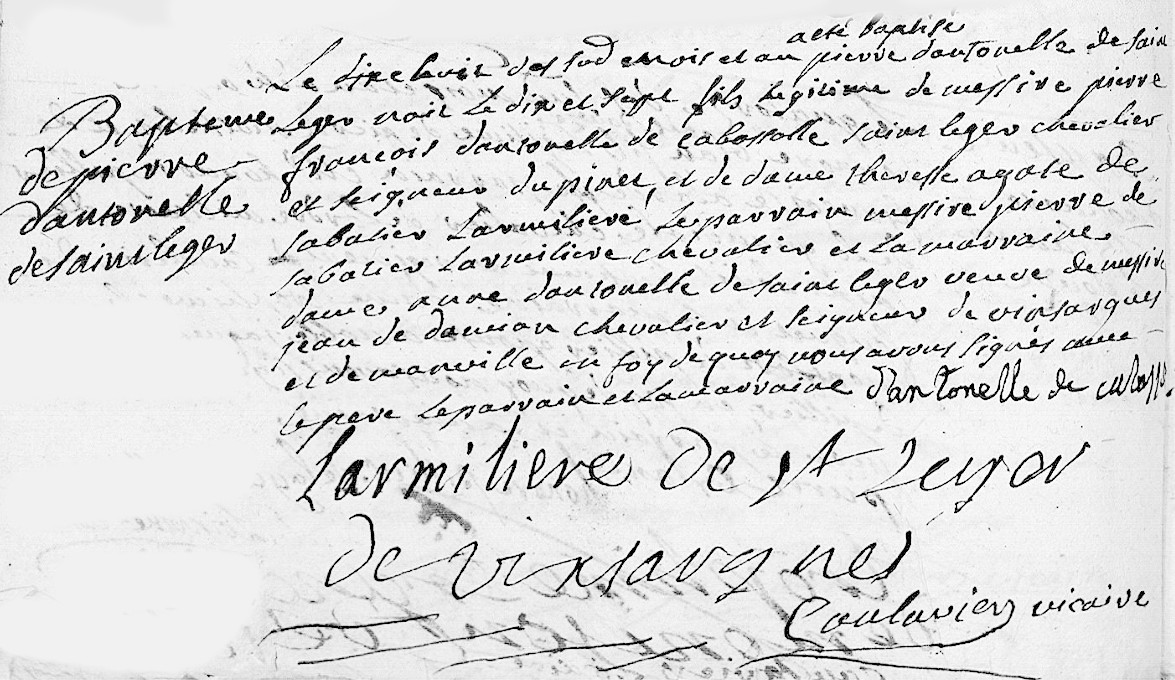
Pierre-Antoine d'Antonelle's birthday act.

Antonelle was born to a wealthy aristocratic family in Arles. Antonelle's father died in December 1747, and therefore Antonelle was largely raised by his mother and the archbishop of Angoulême. The strict education he received from the archbishop is cited as one of the primary factors behind his later anticlericalism. In 1762, Antonelle served as a cadet in the Armée, eventually reaching the rank of lieutenant and commanding his own regiment. He had little taste for army life, resigning in 1782.

=== Revolutionary period ===
Antonelle, heavily inspired by the Age of Enlightenment was an early supporter of the French Revolution. He was the leader of the Monnaidiers, the Arlesien partisans of the Revolution. He was the first elected mayor of Arles and as mayor adopted a series of anticlerical policies, including the expulsion of non-juring priests. While still mayor of Arles, Antonelle was sent to Avignon to facilitate the reunion of the Comtat Venaissin with France. Afterwards, Antonelle was sent to Marseille with orders to restore public order. Beginning in June 1791, Antonelle was forced to flee Arles for Aix-en-Provence, when public opinion turned against the revolution.

In August 1791, Antonelle was elected deputy of Bouches-du-Rhône to the Assemblée nationale législative, and soon became secretary to the body. He was sent to the Armée du Nord with orders to arrest Gilbert du Motier, Marquis de Lafayette, but was detained in Mézières while La Fayette escaped.

After returning to Paris, Antonelle became president of the Jacobin Club and became a member of the Revolutionary Tribunal. He refused to strongly condemn the Girondists, a move which was regarded with suspicion by Antonelle's Jacobin allies, and Antonelle was imprisoned until the Thermidorian reaction.

Shortly after being freed from prison, Antonelle sided with the National Convention during the insurrection of 13 Vendémiaire. After this, Antonelle largely retired from active political service to publish works on the theory behind the Revolution and on human rights. In November 1795, he became the editor in chief of Bulletin politique, the official journal of the Directory. Antonelle was fired from the position after only ten days, and he moved on to become one of the principal contributors to the Journal des hommes libres.

In 1796, Antonelle was named one of the secret directors of the Conspiracy of Equals but was acquitted, possibly due to the influence of Paul Barras. Alongside Barras, Antonelle then founded the journal Démocrate constitutionnel. He supported the Coup of 18 Fructidor but was nearly imprisoned again when Antoine Christophe Merlin attempted to have Antonelle deported as an aristocrat. He was elected deputy of the Bouches-du-Rhône, but the election was declared invalid the next day. Frustrated, Antonelle began to publish anti-government polemics and co-founded the Club du Manège. Shortly before Napoléon's coup d'état, Antonelle was elected to the Council of 500, but the election was again annulled. One week later, Antonelle was exiled to Charente-Inférieure.

=== Later life ===
After being exiled, Antonelle was regarded as a dangerous anarchist agitator and repeatedly denounced during the First French Empire. As a result, he allied himself with Louis XVIII during the Bourbon Restoration, publishing a pamphlet titled Réveil d'un vieillard which advocated a constitutional monarchy. After spending some time in Italy, he retired to Arles where he inherited a large estate. Still popular in Arles, he became well known for his fair treatment of the farmers who worked his lands. Crowds greeted his public funeral ceremony in 1817, which was boycotted by local clergy due to his strong anticlericalism.
