= Augustin Alexandre Darthé =

French revolutionary

Augustin Alexandre Darthé (10 October 1769 – 27 May 1797) was a French revolutionary.

== Life ==
=== Revolutionary ===
Born in Saint-Pol-sur-Ternoise, he became administrator of the département of Pas-de-Calais after the outbreak of the French Revolution, and, as an admirer of Maximilien Robespierre, became a public agitator.

He escaped the death penalty after the Thermidorian Reaction, and befriended François-Noël Babeuf, being one of the main contributors to the conspiracy planned by the latter against the French Directory.

The action ought to have reflected the Manifesto of Equals, written by Sylvain Maréchal, aiming at taking the power by violence and forcing an egalitarian society, questioning the fact that democratic elections can be trusted to improve society.

=== Arrest and trial ===
On 10 May 1796 Babeuf was arrested with many of his associates, among whom was Darthé. The common trial was fixed to take place before the newly constituted High Court of Justice at Vendôme.

On 10 and 11 Fructidor (27 and 28 August 1796), when the prisoners were removed from Paris, there were tentative efforts at a riot and planned rescue, but these were easily suppressed. The attempt of five or six hundred Jacobins (7 September) to rouse the soldiers at Grenelle met with no better success.

The trial, begun at Vendôme on 20 February 1797, lasted two months. On 7 Prairial (26 May) Babeuf and Darthé were sentenced to death, and guillotined at Vendôme the next day (8 Prairial).
