= François-Noël Babeuf =

French revolutionary and journalist (1760–1797)

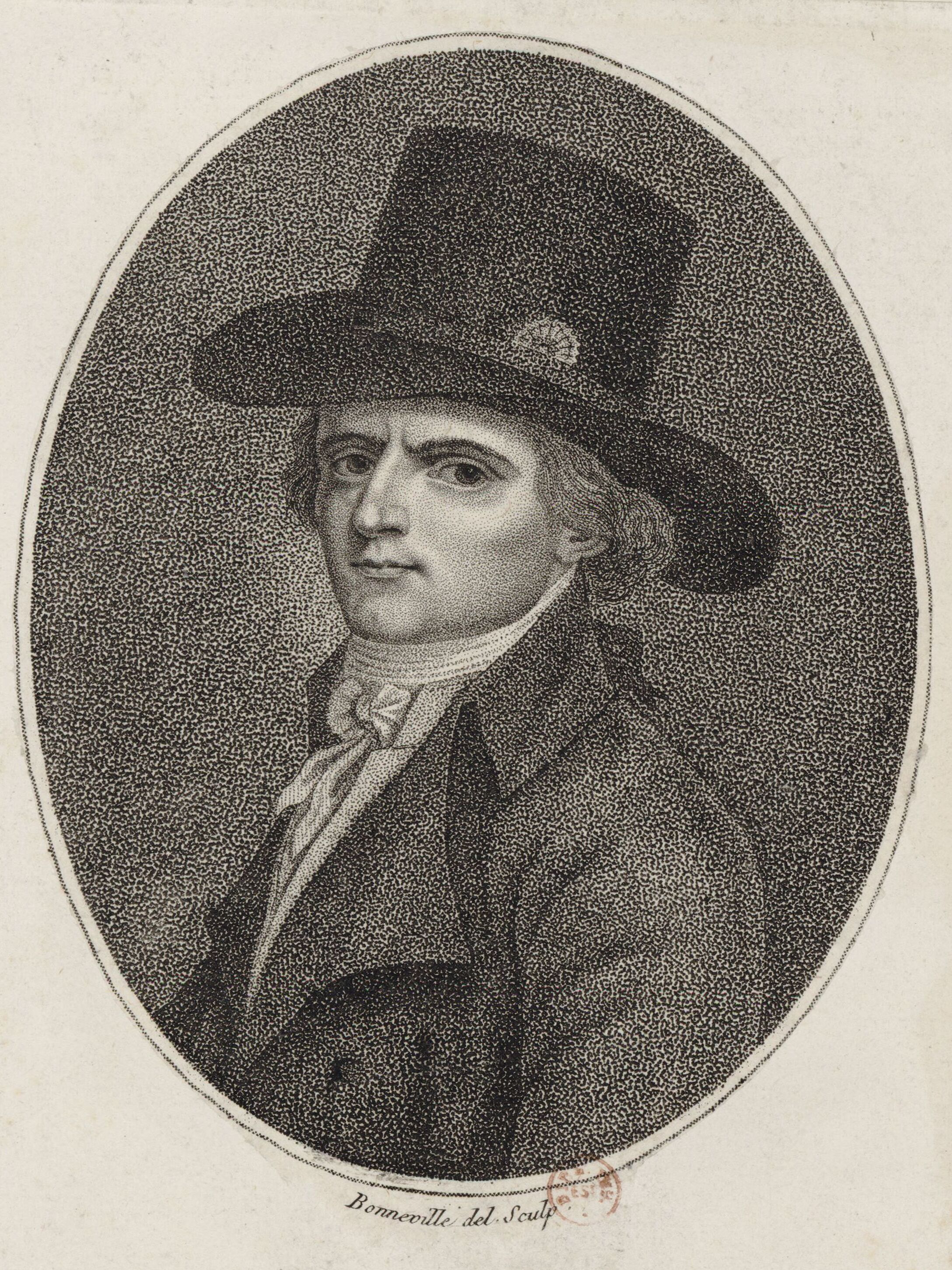
- François-Noël "Gracchus" Babeuf
- Born: 23 November 1760; Saint-Quentin, France
- Died: 27 May 1797 (aged 36); Vendôme, France
- Cause of death: Execution by guillotine

Philosophical work
- Era: 18th-century philosophy
- Region: Western philosophy
- School: Utopian socialism
- Main interests: Political philosophy
- Notable ideas: Communism

François-Noël Babeuf (French: [fʁɑ̃swa nɔɛl babœf]; 23 November 1760 – 27 May 1797), also known as Gracchus Babeuf, was a French proto-communist, revolutionary, and journalist of the French Revolutionary period. His newspaper Le Tribun du Peuple (The Tribune of the People) was best known for its advocacy for the poor and calling for a popular revolt against the Directory, the government of France. He was a leading advocate for democracy and the abolition of private property. He made his own variant of Jacobinism (Robespierrism) which is called Neo-Jacobinism. Besides the influence of Robespierrism on his thought, due to his proto-communism, his political views were more aligned with the ideology of the Enragés. He angered the authorities who were clamping down hard on their radical enemies. In spite of the efforts of his Jacobin friends to save him, Babeuf was executed for his lead role in the Conspiracy of the Equals.

The nickname "Gracchus" likened him to the Gracchi brothers, who served as tribunes of the people in ancient Rome. Although the terms anarchist, communist and socialist were not largely used in Babeuf's lifetime, they have all been used by later scholars to describe his ideas. Communism was first used in English by John Goodwyn Barmby in a conversation with those he described as the "disciples of Babeuf". He has been called "The First Revolutionary Communist."

About his political philosophy, Babeuf wrote: "Society must be made to operate in such a way that it eradicates once and for all the desire of a man to become richer, or wiser, or more powerful than others." In the Manifesto of the Equals, a piece of writing commissioned by Babeuf, Sylvain Maréchal wrote that "[the] French Revolution [was] nothing but a precursor of another revolution, one that will be greater, more solemn, and which will be the last."

== Early life ==
Babeuf was born at St. Nicaise near the town of Saint-Quentin. His father, Claude Babeuf, had deserted the French Royal Army in 1738 for the Austrian Imperial Army, reportedly rising to the rank of major. Amnestied in 1755, he returned to France, but soon sank into poverty, and had to work as a casual labourer to support his family. The hardships endured by Babeuf during his early years contributed to the development of his political opinions. His father gave him a basic education, but until the outbreak of the Revolution, he was a domestic servant, and from 1785 occupied the office of commissaire à terrier (commissary of land records), assisting the nobles and priests in the assertion of their feudal rights over the peasants. Accused of abandoning the feudal aristocracy, he would later say that "the sun of the French Revolution" had brought him to view his "mother, the feudal system" as a "hydra with a hundred heads."

== Revolutionary activities ==
Babeuf was working for a land surveyor at Roye when the Revolution began. His father had died in 1780, and he now had to provide for his wife and two children, as well as for his mother, brothers and sisters.

He was a prolific writer, and the signs of his future socialism are contained in a letter of 21 March 1787, one of a series mainly on literature and addressed to the secretary of the Academy of Arras. In 1789 he drew up the first article of the cahier of the electors of the bailliage of Roye, demanding the abolition of feudal rights. From July to October 1789, he lived in Paris, superintending the publication of his first work: Cadastre perpetuel, dedié a l'assemblée nationale, l'an 1789 et le premier de la liberté française ("National Cadastre or land register, Dedicated to the National Assembly, Year 1789 and the First One of French Liberty"), which was written in 1789 and issued in 1790. The same year he published a pamphlet against feudal aids and the gabelle (salt tax), for which he was denounced and arrested, but provisionally released.

=== Political writings and imprisonment ===
In October, on his return to Roye, he founded the Correspondant Picard, a political journal that would have 40 issues. Babeuf used his journal to agitate for a progressive taxation system, and condemned the "census suffrage" planned for the 1791 elections to the Legislative Assembly in which citizen votes would be weighted by their social standing. Due to his political activities, he was arrested on 19 May 1790, but released in July before the Fête de la Fédération, thanks to pressure exerted nationally by Jean-Paul Marat. In November Babeuf was elected a member of the municipality of Roye, but was expelled.

In March 1791, Babeuf was appointed commissioner to report on the national property (biens nationaux) in the town, and in September 1792 was elected a member of the council-general of the département of the Somme. A rivalry with the principal administrator and later deputy to the Convention, André Dumont, forced Babeuf to transfer to the post of administrator of the district of Montdidier. There he was accused of fraud for having altered a name in a deed of transfer of national lands. The error was probably due to negligence; but, distrusting the impartiality of the judges of the Somme, he fled to Paris, and on 23 August 1793 was sentenced in contumaciam to twenty years' imprisonment. Meanwhile, he had been appointed secretary to the relief committee (comité des subsistances) of the Paris Commune.

The judges of Amiens pursued him with a warrant for his arrest, which took place in Brumaire of the year II (1793). The Court of Cassation quashed the sentence, through defect of form, and sent Babeuf for a new trial before the Aisne tribunal, which acquitted him on 18 July 1794, only days before the Thermidorian Reaction.

Babeuf returned to Paris, and on 3 September 1794 published the first issue of his Journal de la Liberté de la Presse ("Journal of the Freedom of the Press"), whose title was changed on 5 October 1794 to Le Tribun du Peuple ("The Tribune of the People"). The execution of Maximilien Robespierre on 28 July 1794 had ended the Reign of Terror and begun the White Terror. Babeuf – now styling himself Gracchus Babeuf, after the martyred Roman reformers the Gracchi brothers – defended the fallen Terror politicians with the stated goal of achieving equality "in fact" and not only "by proclamation". However about the Terror, he said "I object to this particular aspect of their system." Babeuf attacked the leaders of the Thermidorian Reaction and, from a socialistic point of view, the economic outcome of the Revolution. He also argued for the inclusion of women into the political clubs.

This was an attitude which had few supporters, even in the Jacobin Club, and in October Babeuf was arrested and imprisoned at Arras. Here he was influenced by political prisoners, notably Philippe Buonarroti, Simon Duplay, and René-François Lebois, editor of the Journal de l'Égalité ("Journal of Equality") and afterwards of the L'Ami du peuple ("The Friend of the People") papers of Leclerc which carried on the traditions of Jean-Paul Marat. Babeuf emerged from prison a confirmed advocate of revolution and convinced that his project, fully proclaimed to the world in Issue 33 of his Tribun, could come about only through the restoration of the Constitution of 1793. That constitution had been ratified by a national referendum by universal male suffrage but never implemented.

In February 1795, Babeuf was arrested again, and the Tribun du peuple was solemnly burnt in the Théatre des Bergeres by the jeunesse dorée, young men whose mission was to root out Jacobinism. Babeuf might have faded into obscurity like other agitators, but for the appalling economic conditions caused by the fall in the value of assignats.

=== Conspiracy of the Equals ===
The attempts of the Directory to deal with the economic crisis gave Babeuf his historical importance. The new government wanted to abolish the system which benefitted Paris at the expense of all France. To this goal, the government planned to abolish the sale of bread and meat at nominal prices, on 20 February 1796. The announcement caused widespread consternation. Workers and the large class of proletarians attracted to Paris by the system, as well as rentiers and government officials, whose incomes were paid in assignats arbitrarily set by the government, felt threatened with starvation. The government yielded to the outcry, and tried to mitigate the problem by dividing people entitled to relief into classes, but this only increased alarm and discontent.

The universal misery gave point to Babeuf's virulent attacks on the existing order and gained him a hearing. He gained a small circle of followers known as the Societé des égaux ("Society of the Equals"), soon merged with the rump of the Jacobin Club, who met at the Panthéon. In November 1795, police reported that Babeuf was openly preaching "insurrection, revolt and the Constitution of 1793". The group was influenced by Sylvain Maréchal, the author of Le Manifeste des Égaux (The Manifesto of the Equals) and a sympathiser of Babeuf.

For a time, the government left Babeuf alone but observed his activities. The Directory benefitted from the leftist agitation because it counteracted royalist movements for overthrowing the Directory. Most workers, even of extreme views, were repelled by Babeuf's bloodthirstiness; and police reported that his agitation increased support for the government. The Jacobin Club refused to admit Babeuf and Lebois, on the ground that they were "throat-cutters" (égorgeurs).

However, the economic crisis increased Babeuf's influence. After Napoleon Bonaparte closed the club of the Panthéon on 27 February 1796, Babeuf increased his activity. In Ventôse and Germinal (late winter and early spring) under the pseudonym Lalande, soldat de la patrie, Babeuf published the paper "Scout of the People, or Defender of Twenty-Five Million Oppressed" (Éclaireur du Peuple, ou le Défenseur de Vingt-Cinq Millions d'Opprimés), which was passed from group to group secretly in the streets of Paris.

At the same time, Issue 40 of Babeuf's Tribun caused immense sensation as it praised the authors of the September Massacres as "deserving well of their country" and declared that a more complete "2 September" was needed to destroy the government, which consisted of "starvers, bloodsuckers, tyrants, hangmen, rogues and mountebanks".

Distress among all classes continued. In March, the Directory tried to replace assignats by a new issue of mandats and this raised hopes, but they were soon dashed. A rumour that national bankruptcy had been declared caused thousands of the lower class of workers to rally to Babeuf's ideas. On 4 April 1796, the government received a report that 500,000 Parisians needed relief. From 11 April, Paris was placarded with posters headed "Analysis of Babeuf's Teaching" (Analyse de la Doctrine de Baboeuf) [sic], Tribun du Peuple, which began with the sentence "Nature has given to every man the right to the enjoyment of an equal share in all property", and ended with a call to restore the Constitution of 1793.

=== Arrest and execution ===
Babeuf's song "Dying of Hunger, Dying of Cold" (Mourant de faim, mourant de froid), set to a popular tune, began to be sung in cafés, with immense applause. Reports circulated that the disaffected troops of the French Revolutionary Army in the camp of Grenelle were ready to join an insurrection against the government. The bureau central had accumulated through its agents (notably ex-captain Georges Grisel, who was initiated into Babeuf's society) evidence of a conspiracy (later called the Conspiracy of Equals) for an armed uprising fixed for 22 Floréal, year IV (11 May 1796), which involved Jacobins and leftists.

The Directory thought it time to react. On 10 May Babeuf, who had taken the pseudonym Tissot, was arrested. Many of his associates were gathered by the police on order from Lazare Carnot: among them were Augustin Alexandre Darthé and Philippe Buonarroti, the ex-members of the National Convention, Robert Lindet, Jean-Pierre-André Amar, Marc-Guillaume Alexis Vadier and Jean-Baptiste Drouet, famous as the postmaster of Sainte-Menehould who had arrested Louis XVI during the latter's Flight to Varennes, and now a member of the Directory's Council of Five Hundred. The government crackdown was extremely successful. The last issue of the Tribun appeared on 24 April, although René-François Lebois in the L'Ami du peuple tried to incite the soldiers to revolt, and for a while there were rumours of a military uprising.

Babeuf and his accomplices were to be tried at the newly created high court at Vendôme. When the prisoners were removed from Paris on 10 and 11 Fructidor (27 August and 28 August 1796), there were tentative efforts at a riot hoping to rescue the prisoners, but these were easily suppressed. On 7 September 1796, 500 or 600 Jacobins tried to rouse the soldiers at Grenelle but also failed. The trial was held at Vendôme beginning on 20 February 1797. Although several people were involved in the conspiracy, the government depicted Babeuf as the leader. On 7 Prairial (26 May 1797) Babeuf and Darthé were condemned to death; some of the prisoners, including Buonarroti, were deported; the rest, including Vadier and his fellow-conventionals, were acquitted. Drouet managed to escape, according to Paul Barras, with the connivance of the Directory. Babeuf and Darthé were guillotined the next day at Vendôme, 8 Prairial (27 May 1797), without appeal. Babeuf's body was transported and buried in a mass grave in the Vendôme's old cemetery of the Grand Faubourg, in Loir-et-Cher.

== See also ==
- Grenelle camp affair
- Neo-Babouvism
- Pierre-Antoine Antonelle
- Society of the Friends of Truth
