= Antoine Nicolas Collier =

Antoine Nicolas Collier, Comte de La Marlière (3 December 1745 – 27 November 1793), was a French Army officer and Republican General during the Wars of the French Revolution.

== Career ==
Collier became Comte de La Marlière on 22 July 1756 and was admitted into the Royal Military School as Capitaine des levrettes. Promoted Lieutenant Colonel 6 February 1791, he was made Colonel of the 14th Infantry Regiment 5 February 1792, and Maréchal de camp 25 August 1792.

La Marlière joined the Armée du Nord in the War of the First Coalition, and was attached to the garrison of Lille, then was given command in the Northern Division of the Army of Belgium under Miranda on 1 December 1792. He was made Chief Staff Major in the Army of the Ardennes under Valence 22 March 1793, then was promoted brevet Major-General by Dampierre, under whom he commanded a Division at the battle of Raismes 8 May.

In conflict with General Lavalette, he was impeached 22 July and brought before the Revolutionary Tribunal. Sentenced to death on 26 November 1793, he was guillotined the next day.
