= Sylvain Maréchal =

French writer and philosopher (1750–1803)

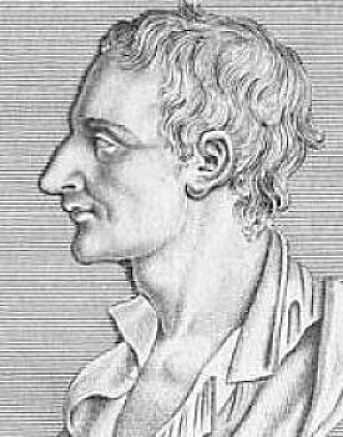
Sylvain Maréchal

Sylvain Maréchal (French: [silvɛ̃ maʁeʃal]; 15 August 1750 – 18 January 1803) was a French essayist, poet, philosopher and political theorist, whose views presaged utopian socialism and communism. His views on a future golden age are occasionally described as utopian anarchism. He was editor of the newspaper Révolutions de Paris.

== Early life ==
Born in Paris as the son of a wine merchant, he studied jurisprudence and became a lawyer in the capital. At the age of 20, he published Bergeries, a collection of idylls, successful enough to ensure his employment at the Collège Mazarin as an aide-librarian.

Maréchal was an admirer of Jean-Jacques Rousseau, Voltaire, Claude Adrien Helvétius, and Denis Diderot, and associated with deist and atheist authors.

== Vision ==
He developed his own views of an agrarian socialism where all goods would be shared. In Fragments d'un poème moral sur Dieu ("Fragments of a Moral Poem on God"), he aimed to replace elements of practiced religion with a cult of Virtue and faith with Reason (see Cult of Reason).

His critique of both religion and political absolutism Book Salvaged from the Flood – Livre échappé du déluge, a parody of the Bible) and his atheism caused him to lose his position at the college; Maréchal was forced to live off his literary output.

In 1788, he was sentenced to four months in prison for publishing the Almanach des Honnêtes Gens ("Honest Man's Almanac"). The months were given names numbered one through twelve (for example, March is the first month, listed as "mars ou princeps", while February is "février ou duodécembre". The calendar also replaced the usual figures of a calendars of saints with famous characters (such as Blaise Pascal). Later editions of the Almanach used the French Republican Calendar.

From this moment on until his death he published anonymously to prevent further prosecutions.

== Atheist ideology ==
During Maréchal's lifetime, atheism was consistently frowned upon by the highly religious people of France. Living in a traditionalist Christian country, he would often write about his thoughts on the church, often critical of the doctrines and beliefs held by the Christians of his time.

In his 1799 essay, Preliminary discourse, or Answer to the question: What is an atheist?, Sylvain Maréchal proclaimed that he had no more need of God than God needed him, and proclaimed such an attitude was "true atheism" after rejecting several competing stances. He outright rejected the idea of masters ruling his life, and that included the will of any god. For him, to believe in God is to submit to hierarchy.

== Revolution ==
An enthusiastic supporter of the French Revolution, Maréchal also advocated the defense of the poor. He did not become involved in the conflict opposing Girondists and Jacobins, and became instead worried about the outcome of revolutionary events, especially after the Thermidorian Reaction and the establishment of the French Directory. The encounter between him and François-Noël Babeuf (Gracchus Babeuf) and involvement in the latter's conspiracy was to find in Maréchal an early influence on utopian socialism, as evidenced by the manifesto he wrote in support of Babeuf's goals: "The Manifesto of the Equals" – Le Manifeste des Égaux (first issued in 1796).

His later works include an 1801 Projet de loi portant défense d'apprendre à lire aux femmes ("Bill Forbidding the Teaching of Reading to Women"), which relates to the subject matter of women's studies and egalitarianism, as well as a Dictionnaire des Athées anciens et modernes ("Dictionary of Ancient and Modern Atheists"). He died at Montrouge in 1803.

== Works ==
- Bibliothèque des amans. A gnide (1764)
- Bergeries (1770)
- Chansons anacréontiques (1770)
- Essais de poésies légères suivis d'un songe (1775)
- Dieu et les prêtres, Fragments d'un poème philosophique
- Le livre de tous les ages, ou, Le Pibrac moderne: quatrains moraux (1779)
- Fragmens d'un poème moral sur Dieu (1781)
- L'Âge d'Or (1782)
- Nouvelle méthode courte et facile pour apprendre à lire aux enfans (1783). Contains also: Le Drelincourt moderne. Quatrains moraux
- Livre échappé du déluge (1784)
- Histoire de France, représentée par figures accompagnées de discours. Tome premier; Tome second; Tome troisième; Tome quatrième; Tome cinquième (1787–1796)
- Almanach des Honnêtes Gens (1788)
- Costumes civils actuels de tous les peuples connus, dessinés da̕près nature, gravés et coloriés, accompagnés d'une notice historique sur leurs coutumes, mœurs, religions, &c. &c.. Tome premier; Tome second; Tome troisieme (1788)
- Apologues modernes, à l'usage d'un dauphin, premières leçons du fils aîné d'un roi (1788)
- Antiquités d'Herculanum; ou, Les plus belles peintures antiques ... (1789)
- Dame Nature à la barre de l'Assemblée nationale (1791)
- Dictionnaire des honnêtes gens (1791)
- Anecdotes peu connues, sur les journées des 2 et s Septembre 1792. a Paris (ca. 1792)
- La constitution française en chansons. A l'usage des honnêtes gens (1792)
- Jugement dernier des rois, prophétie et un acte, en prose (théâtre, 1793)
- Almanach des honnêtes gens, contenant les prophéties pour chaque mois de l'année 1793, des anecdotes peu connues sur les journées de 10 août, 2 et 3 septembre 1792; et la liste des personnes égorgées dans les différentes prisons (1793)
- Pensées libres sur les prêtres (1798)
- Le Lucrèse français, fragmens d'un poëme (1798)
- Culte et lois d'une société d'hommes sans Dieu (1798)
- Les Voyages de Pythagore en Égypte, dans la Chaldée, dans l'Inde, en Crète, a Sparte. en Sicile, a Rome, a Carthage, a Marseille et dans les Gaules (1799)
- Dictionnaire des Athées anciens et modernes (1800)
- Histoire universelle en style lapidaire (1800)
- Pour et contre la Bible (1801)
- La femme abbé (1801)
- Le Manifeste des Égaux (1801)
- De la vertu (1807)
- Projet d'une loi portant défense d'apprendre à lire aux femmes (1841)

=== Works in English translation ===
- The Woman Priest: A Translation of Sylvain Marechal's Novella, "La femme abbe" , translated by Sheila Delany, 2016, University of Alberta Press.
- For and Against the Bible: A Translation of Sylvain Maréchal's Pour Et Contre la Bible (1801). by Sheila Delany, 2020, Netherlands, Brill .

== See also ==
- Society of the Friends of Truth
- History of Socialism
