= Popol Out West =

Comic by Belgian cartoonist Hergé

Popol Out West Peppy in the Wild West (Popol et Virginie Chez les Lapinos)
- Cover of the 2017 English edition
- Date: 1934
- Publisher: Casterman

Creative team
- Creator: Hergé

Original publication
- Published in: Le Petit Vingtième
- Language: French

Translation
- Publisher: Methuen; Fantagraphics Books
- Date: 1969; 2017
- Translator: Leslie Lonsdale-Cooper; Michael Turner; Kim Thompson; Jenna Allen

Popol Out West (French: Popol et Virginie chez les Lapinos) is a comic by the Belgian cartoonist Hergé, better known as the creator of The Adventures of Tintin series. Commissioned by the conservative Belgian newspaper Le Vingtième Siècle ("The Twentieth Century") for its children's supplement Le Petit Vingtième, it was serialised weekly from February to August 1934. The story tells of two anthropomorphic bears, Popol and Virginia, who travel into the Wild West to sell hats, facing opposition from a tribe of hostile Native American rabbits and a criminal bulldog named Bully Bull.

The story contains a number of elements that Hergé had already utilized in earlier comics The Adventures of Tim the Squirrel out West (1931) and The Adventures of Tom and Millie (1933). He prevented its republication during the German occupation of Belgium, and it was colourised and republished in 1948 in Tintin magazine. Casterman first published it in a collected album in 1952.

== Synopsis ==
As hats go out of fashion, the anthropomorphic bear Popol the Hatter heads into the American West with his wife Virginia and blue donkey, Bluebell. Setting up camp in the land of the Bunnokee, a tribe of anthropomorphic rabbit Native Americans, he does good business there. This infuriates the Bunnokee medicine man, whose feather headdress business has declined as a result. He and the Chief of the Bunnokees conspired to eradicate the economic threat, launching a war against Popol. Using technology that is more advanced than the Bunnokee's bow and arrows, Popol defeats the rabbits' initial attacks, but they retaliate by abducting Virginia and threatening to torture her. Popol then rescues her, and together they escape, coming upon a river in which they discover gold.

They are captured by the gangster Bully Bull, the anthropomorphised bulldog. Although they escaped once, he recaptures them before Bluebell kicks him so hard that he flies into the air and lands in Santa Barbara, where he is found and imprisoned by a sheriff. While Popol, Virginia, and Bluebell manage to make their way across a deep ravine, Bully Bull escapes from jail and attacks Popol on a steep face. All of them fall down the cliff, but are rescued by firemen with a trampoline, and Bully Bull is once more apprehended.

== History ==
=== Background ===
Georges Remi—best known under the pen name Hergé—was employed as editor and illustrator of Le Petit Vingtième ("The Little Twentieth"), a children's supplement to Le Vingtième Siècle ("The Twentieth Century"), a staunchly Roman Catholic, conservative Belgian newspaper based in Hergé's native Brussels which was run by the Abbé Norbert Wallez. In 1929, Hergé began The Adventures of Tintin comic strip for Le Petit Vingtième, revolving around the exploits of fictional Belgian reporter Tintin. Wallez ordered Hergé to set his first adventure in the Soviet Union as anti-socialist propaganda for children (Tintin in the Land of the Soviets), to set his second adventure in the Belgian Congo to encourage colonial sentiment (Tintin in the Congo), and to set his third adventure in the United States to use the story as a denunciation of American capitalism (Tintin in America). In January 1930, Hergé also introduced Quick & Flupke (Quick et Flupke), a new comic strip about two street kids from Brussels, in the pages of Le Petit Vingtième. Wallez was subsequently removed from the paper's editorship following a scandal, although Hergé was convinced to stay on the condition of a salary increase.

The idea of using anthropomorphic furry animals as protagonists in a story set in the American West pre-dated Popol Out West by several years. In December 1931, Hergé produced Tim-L'Écureuil, Héros du Far-West ("Tim the Squirrel, Hero of the Far West") for L'Innovation, a large department store in Brussels. Printed in colour, it was serialised in 16 weekly installments, and was aimed at encouraging children's interest in the store. Hergé reused plot elements from this in The Adventures of Tom and Millie, a strip about two bear cubs which was commissioned by the weekly Vie Herueuse for their supplement, Pim and Pom, in early 1933.

=== Publication ===
Hergé began work on the story following the culmination of his fourth Tintin adventure, Cigars of the Pharaoh, and it was serialised in Le Petit Vingtième over the following months under the title Popol et Virginie au pays des Lapinos ("Popol and Virginie in the Land of the Lapinos"). The names of the characters were inspired by Bernadin de Saint-Pierre's pastoral novel Paul and Virginia. The use of talking animals followed in the tradition of fables by La Fontaine and that of J. J. Grandville's illustrations, as well as the contemporary American films of Walt Disney. Hergé would describe the story as an opportunity "to get away from realism for a bit", adding that it allowed him "A little unreality to give me a break from the rules of 'credibility' to which I'm subjected with Tintin." It was not, however, received with much enthusiasm from the paper's readership, with many readers writing in to ask when The Adventures of Tintin would resume.

During the German occupation of Belgium in the Second World War, Casterman suggested that Hergé oversee a Flemish translation and publication of Popol et Virginie au pays des Lapinos. He was sceptical, however, and organised the publication of a Flemish volume of Quick and Flupke instead. He later asserted that this decision had been because the story involved arms dealers, and that in the political climate of the time this theme could "cause us problems if not the outright refusal of permission to publish." In 1948, the comic was coloured and re-serialised, this time in the newly launched Tintin magazine, and then published in a single softcover volume by Casterman in 1952. Casterman republished it in 1968 with a new cover design and a new title, Popol et Virginie chez les Lapinos (Popol and Virginie with the Lapinos). The story was translated into English by Michael Turner and Leslie Lonsdale-Cooper and published by Methuen as Popol Out West in 1969. A new English edition, translated by Kim Thompson, was announced by Fantagraphics in 2013 under the title Peppy and Virginny in Lapinoland. Due to Thompson's death, it would not be published until 2017 under the title Peppy in the Wild West, with the translation completed by Jenna Allen.

== Critical analysis ==
Tintinologist Harry Thompson stated that the story "wasn't up to much". Hergé biographer Pierre Assouline commented on its "naïveté and sentimentality" which he thought appealed to children, but also suggested that its discussion of political and economic themes would appeal to adults. Tintinologist Philippe Goddin also commented on the perceived adult elements of the story, which included advertising, fashion, financial failure, profit taking, economic boycotts, and protectionism. Goddin further opined that the story was pervaded by "the mood of the times" with the increasing dominance of Nazi Germany in Europe; in the story, the Bunnokee soldiers goose-step in front of their leader, referencing the goose-steps of Nazi troops in front of German Führer Adolf Hitler, while arms dealers sell weaponry to both sides, again a reflection of current events.
