= Cochonnet =

Cochonnet, small pig in French (piglet may rather translate in porcelet), may refer to:

- a character in Flup, Nénesse, Poussette and Cochonnet, a minor comics by Hergé
- a small wooden ball used in pétanque
