= The Adventures of Totor =

Comics series by Belgian cartoonist Hergé

The Adventures of Totor, Chief Scout of the Cockchafers
- One of the early installments of Les Aventures de Totor

Publication information
- Publisher: Le Boy Scout Belge
- Genre: Adventure comics, text comics
- Publication date: July 1926 – July 1929

Creative team
- Written by: Hergé
- Artist: Hergé

The Adventures of Totor, Chief Scout of the Cockchafers (French: Les Aventures de Totor, C.P. des hannetons) is the first comic strip series by the Belgian cartoonist and author Hergé, who later came to notability as the author of The Adventures of Tintin series. It was serialised monthly from July 1926 to summer 1929 in Belgian scouting magazine Le Boy Scout Belge, with a nine month break in 1927. The plot synopsis revolved around the eponymous Totor, a Belgian boy scout who travels to visit his aunt and uncle in Texas, United States. Once there, he comes across hostile Native American tribes and gangsters, each of whom he outwits, before returning to Belgium.

Like the Bécassine comics, which were common in Western Europe at the time, the series is a text comic, consisting of pictures with separate captions, although Hergé had begun to experiment with the use of speech bubbles throughout, something influenced by American comics. In 1929, Hergé created the character of Tintin for the new story, Tintin in the Land of the Soviets, which would be largely based on Totor. Literary critics have expressed mixed views on the narrative and artwork.

== Characters and story ==
Totor leaves Brussels to go and visit his uncle Pad Hatt and aunt Save Hatt in Rolmopcity, the United States. Along the way he is pulled overboard by a shark and then thrown onto an American submarine which takes him to New York City. Totor is awed by the skyscrapers and is unintentionally hit by a car which flings him into a passing stranger who turns out to be a criminal named John Blood. After Totor receives a $5,000 reward for the gangster he takes a train to his uncle's ranch in Rolmopcity. His uncle picks him up at the station and on their way back a group of Native Americans hold them up. Totor manages to distract the Natives and the two of them escape. However, a few hours later at the ranch, the same tribe kidnaps Totor in revenge. Standing tied to a torture stake Totor is made into a target for knives, axes and arrows. One of the arrows cut the ropes binding him and when the Chief draws close to scalp the young boy, Totor digs his feet into the Sachem's stomach and makes a quick getaway into a river, pretending to have drowned. Underwater, he finds an old chest full of countless jewels and buries them at the base of a boulder nearby.

A trapper in a canoe takes Totor up the river. Leaving the trapper, Totor goes back to the ranch to find it deserted. As he searches the place a hand reaches out and pulls him through a doorway where a fierce brawl ensues in the darkness. Totor is victorious, and throws his three captors out of the building. He discovers his uncle tied to a chair; Totor frees him, and Pad tells his nephew that the bandits kidnapped his aunt Save. Totor suddenly has an idea to use the treasure he found as a ransom for his aunt. The two of them set out to go fetch it, but along the way a criminal steals their map while they sleep. After discovering the loss of their jewels they follow the thief's unique footprints for a few miles. When they see another set of footprints join the first and then head up into some mountains, Totor continues on his own. Having eluded several Native sentries he spies the chest in the hands of the Chief. After recovering the box and outrunning the Natives back to his uncle, they hurriedly head home. There they find a ransom note from the leader of the bandits, Jim Blackcat, saying to meet them under a big fir tree that day or they would kill his aunt. Totor rushes to the rendezvous where he overwhelms the criminals and orders them to tell him where they are keeping his aunt hostage. After a heroic rescue and an emotional reunion between his aunt and uncle, he finds out that it is time for him to go back to Belgium. Once back, he tells everyone of his adventures and wistfully yearns for more.

== Publication ==
Aged 12, Georges Remi—who later became best known under the pen name Hergé—joined the Boy Scout brigade attached to Saint-Boniface School in his native Brussels, becoming troop leader of the Squirrel Patrol and earning the name "Curious Fox" (Renard curieux). With the Scouts, he travelled for summer camps in Italy, Switzerland, Austria and Spain, and in the summer of 1923 his troop hiked 200 miles across the Pyrenees. His experiences with Scouting would have a significant influence on the rest of his life, sparking his love of camping and the natural world, and providing him with a moral compass that stressed personal loyalty and keeping one's promise. His Scoutmaster, Rene Weverbergh, encouraged his artistic ability, and published one of Remi's drawings in the newsletter of the Saint-Boniface Scouts, Jamais Assez (Never Enough); his first published work. When Weverbergh became involved in the publication of Boy-Scout, the newsletter of the Federation of Scouts, he published more of Remi's illustrations, the first of which appeared in the fifth issue, from 1922. Remi continued publishing cartoons, drawings and woodcuts in subsequent issues of the magazine, which was soon renamed Le Boy-Scout Belge (The Belgian Boy Scout). During this time, he experimented with different pseudonyms, using "Jérémie" and "Jérémiades" before settling on "Hergé", the pronunciation of his reversed initials (R.G.), a name that he first published under in December 1924.

Les Aventures de Totor, C.P. des hannetons began serialisation in Le Boy-Scout Belge in July 1926, and would continue to appear in the magazine until July 1929. The meaning of the name has been translated differently; Hergé biographer Pierre Assouline translated it as "The Adventures of Totor, C.P. of the June Bugs", while Tintinologist Harry Thompson instead translated it as "The Adventures of Totor, patrol leader of the Cockchafers", but conversely, biographer Benoît Peeters had it as "The Adventures of Totor, patrol chief of the Scatterbrains". ("hanneton" is French for Cockchafer, a type of beetle, but also the French for "scatterbrain"). Hergé had hoped that being the author of an ongoing comic strip would improve his job prospects, for at the time he was beginning to develop a reputation as a designer of postcards, stationery, and advertisements. Rather than representing an example of a comic as the medium would come to be understood in the following decade, The Adventures of Totor consisted of square boxes containing illustrations with the captions written separately underneath, as was the style found in French comic creator Christophe's works La Famille Fenouillard (The Fenouillard Family) and Sapeur Camembert (Sapper Camembert). Initially using four boxes per page, as the series progressed this was increased to six and then eight, with each page ending on a cliffhanger.

Hergé made pioneering use of speech bubbles in the strip.

Hergé did not make use of speech bubbles, an innovation that was yet to become widespread in Europe, and instead his cartoons were accompanied by captions, three to five lines long. He would begin to add simple speech bubbles into the series, stating simple comments like "Eureka!", "Bang!", and "Hip! Hip! Hip! Hurrah!". Hergé later noted that "From time to time... I risked a timid question mark, or perhaps a few stars, when, for example, a character was punched. I must have seen that in L'Éatant or Les Belles Images, the illustrated papers of the time." Hergé had come under the influence of other comic strips, such as those of the French author Alain Saint-Ogan, and British comic magazine The Rainbow. He was also influenced by the contemporary American comics that reporter Léon Degrelle had sent back to Belgium from Mexico, where he was stationed to report on the Cristero War. These American comics included George McManus's Bringing Up Father, George Herriman's Krazy Kat and Rudolph Dirks's Katzenjammer Kids. Totor's button nose was influenced by the illustrations in Bringing Up Father.

In creating the series, he was also heavily influenced by the films of Charlie Chaplin and Harry Langdon, which he had enjoyed in childhood. This influence was evident in his decision to sign some of the images with the signature "Hergé Moving Pictures" or "Hergé, Director", and giving many of them titles such as "United Rovers presents a great comic film: Les Aventures de Totor, C.P. des hannetons" and "United Rovers presents a stupendous film." He had continued writing and drawing installments in the series during his military service in 1926, but in early 1927 ceased producing the series for nine months as he focused on other projects, only returning to it in late 1927, when he included a résumé of the series at the start.

Gaining work for the conservative newspaper Le Vingtième Siècle (The Twentieth Century), in January 1929 he began serialisation of Tintin in the Land of the Soviets, the first of The Adventures of Tintin, in the newspaper's children's supplement, Le Petit Vingtième (The Little Twentieth). Tintinologist Michael Farr described the character of Totor as a "natural prototype" for Tintin, while literary critic Jean-Marie Apostolidès thought that Hergé "adopted his former hero to the new circumstances". The Tintinologists Jean-Marc and Randy Lofficier thought that graphically, Totor was "virtually identical" to Tintin. The early installments of Tintin in the Land of the Soviets and The Adventures of Totor were contemporary with each other. Hergé decided that he wanted to focus on the new character, bringing the Totor story to an end in July 1929, when he had the main character return to Belgium. In all, the series had lasted for 26 pages. The Adventures of Totor would continue to influence his new series, as the encounters with cowboys and Native Americans would subsequently be reused in the third installment in The Adventures of Tintin, Tintin in America, although Thompson commented that the latter was "a great improvement" on Totor.

== Critical analysis ==
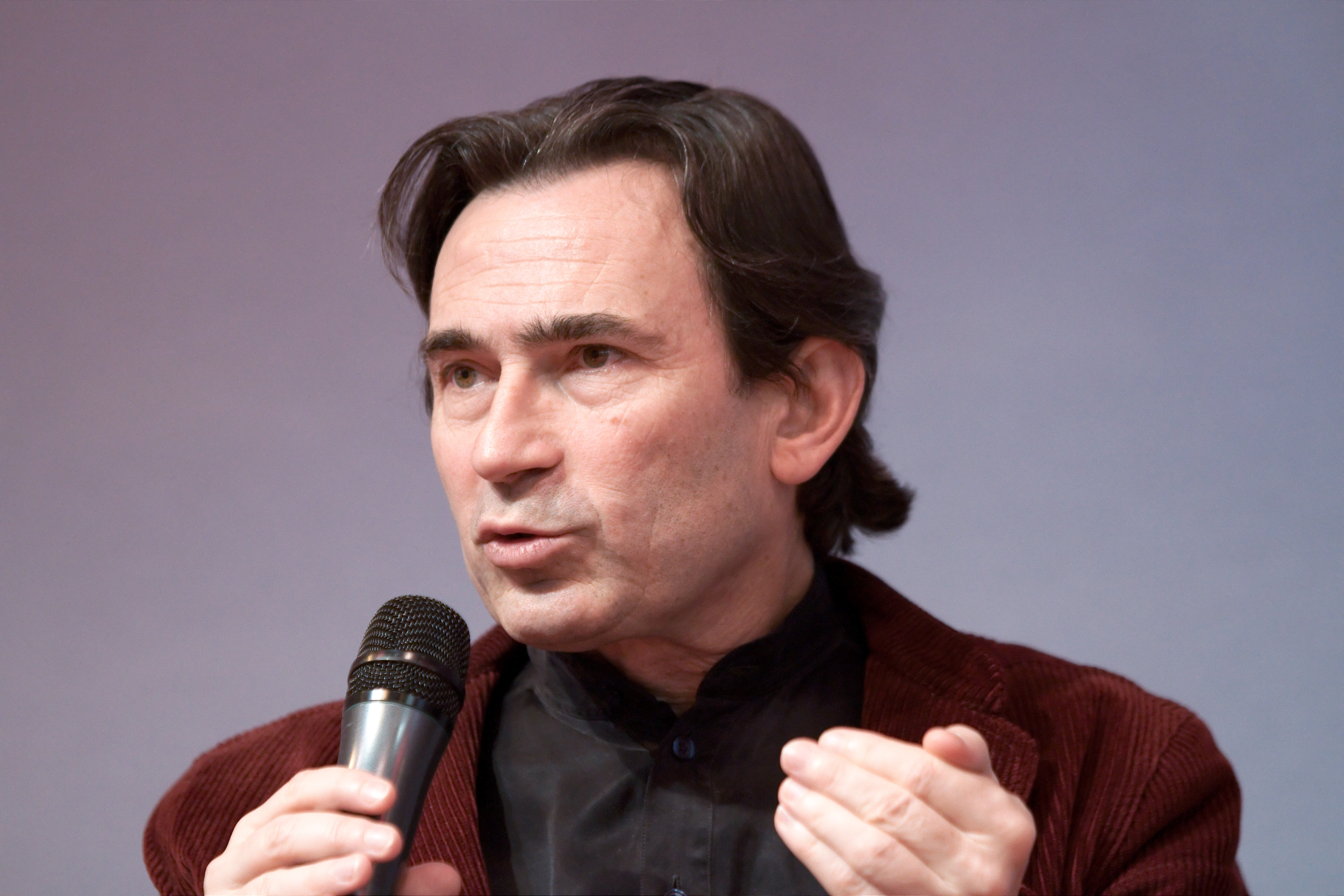
Hergé biographer Benoît Peeters considered The Adventures of Totor "an important step toward the modern comic strip".

Tintinologist Harry Thompson described Totor as "a brave, resourceful young character", noting that in several years he would "metamorphose" into Tintin. He nevertheless thought that the text was "slightly rambling and uninspired." Hergé biographer Pierre Assouline described the Totor story as being "very Boy Scout in spirit and clearly a prefiguration of Tintin." He nevertheless had mixed views of the illustrations, commenting that the lines were "awkward, hesitant, incomplete, but the movement, rhythm, and above all, the humor is apparent." Another biographer, Benoît Peeters, thought that the intrigue of the series was "extremely fragmented" because the main goal was to string gags and fight scenes together rather than to develop a plot. He commented that although by the early 21st century, it appeared "puerile", being "a long way" from the formula of The Adventures of Tintin, it was nevertheless "an important step toward the modern comic strip".

Tintinologist Phillipe Goddin considered the series to be "a milestone", describing it as "full of promise" and containing "plety [sic] of humour, rich in developments". The Tintinologists Jean-Marc and Randy Lofficier commented that "Everything that made Tintin what it later became was seminally present in Totor", including the artistic style, the pace of the story, the use of humour, and the manner in which it imitated motion pictures. They also commented that Totor read like "an adult was retelling one of those early American western serials... to a group of children. On the one hand, he is exciting the children, but on the other, he is winking at the adults as if to say, "you and I know this is not serious.""
