= Hergé =

Belgian cartoonist (1907–1983)

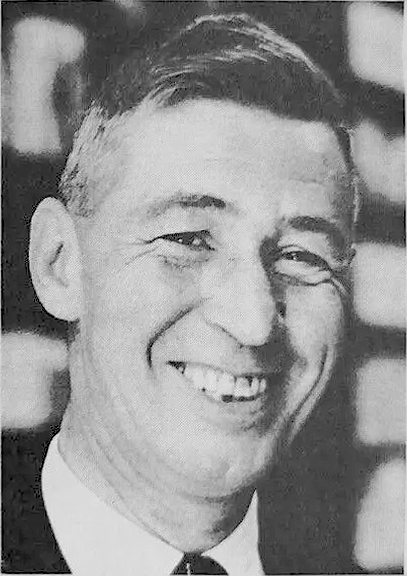
- Hergé in 1965
- Born: Georges Prosper Remi; 22 May 1907 Etterbeek, Brussels, Belgium
- Died: 3 March 1983 (aged 75) Woluwe-Saint-Lambert, Brussels, Belgium
- Area: Cartoonist
- Notable works: The Adventures of Tintin; The Adventures of Jo, Zette and Jocko; Quick & Flupke
- Awards: List of awards
- Spouses: Germaine Kieckens (m. 1932; div. 1977); Fanny Vlamynck (m. 1977)

Georges Prosper Remi (French: [ʒɔʁʒ pʁɔspɛʁ ʁəmi]; 22 May 1907 – 3 March 1983), known by the pen name Hergé (/ɛərˈʒeɪ/ air-ZHAY; French: [ɛʁʒe]), from the French pronunciation of his reversed initials RG, was a Belgian cartoonist. He is best known for creating The Adventures of Tintin, the series of comic albums that are considered one of the most popular European comics of the 20th century. He was also responsible for two other well-known series, Quick & Flupke (1930–1940) and The Adventures of Jo, Zette and Jocko (1936–1957). His works were executed in his distinctive ligne claire drawing style.

Born to a lower-middle-class family in Etterbeek, Brussels, Hergé began his career by contributing illustrations to Scouting magazines, developing his first comic series, The Adventures of Totor, for Le Boy-Scout Belge in 1926. Working for the conservative Catholic newspaper Le Vingtième Siècle, he created The Adventures of Tintin in 1929 on the advice of its editor Norbert Wallez. Revolving around the actions of boy reporter Tintin and his dog Snowy, the series' early instalments – Tintin in the Land of the Soviets, Tintin in the Congo, and Tintin in America – were designed as conservative propaganda for children. Domestically successful, after serialisation the stories were published in book form, with Hergé continuing the series and also developing both the Quick & Flupke and Jo, Zette and Jocko series for Le Vingtième Siècle. Influenced by his friend Zhang Chongren, from 1934 Hergé placed far greater emphasis on conducting background research for his stories, resulting in increased realism from The Blue Lotus onward. Following the German occupation of Belgium in 1940, Le Vingtième Siècle was closed, but Hergé continued his series in Le Soir, a popular newspaper controlled by the Nazi administration.

After the Allied liberation of Belgium in 1944, Le Soir was shut down and its staff – including Hergé – accused of having been collaborators. An official investigation was launched, and although no charges were brought against Hergé, in subsequent years he repeatedly faced accusations of having been a traitor and collaborator. With Raymond Leblanc he established Tintin magazine in 1946, through which he serialised new Adventures of Tintin stories. As the magazine's artistic director, he also oversaw the publication of other successful comics series, such as Edgar P. Jacobs' Blake and Mortimer. In 1950 he established Studios Hergé as a team to aid him in his ongoing projects; prominent staff members Jacques Martin and Bob de Moor greatly contributed to subsequent volumes of The Adventures of Tintin. Amid personal turmoil following the collapse of his first marriage, he produced Tintin in Tibet, his personal favourite of his works. In later years he became less prolific, and unsuccessfully attempted to establish himself as an abstract artist.

Hergé's works have been widely acclaimed for their clarity of draughtsmanship and meticulous, well-researched plots. They have been the source of a wide range of adaptations, in theatre, radio, television, cinema, and computer gaming. He remains a strong influence on the comic book medium, particularly in Europe. He is widely celebrated in Belgium: a Hergé Museum was established in Louvain-la-Neuve in 2009.

== Early life ==
=== Childhood and youth: 1907–1925 ===
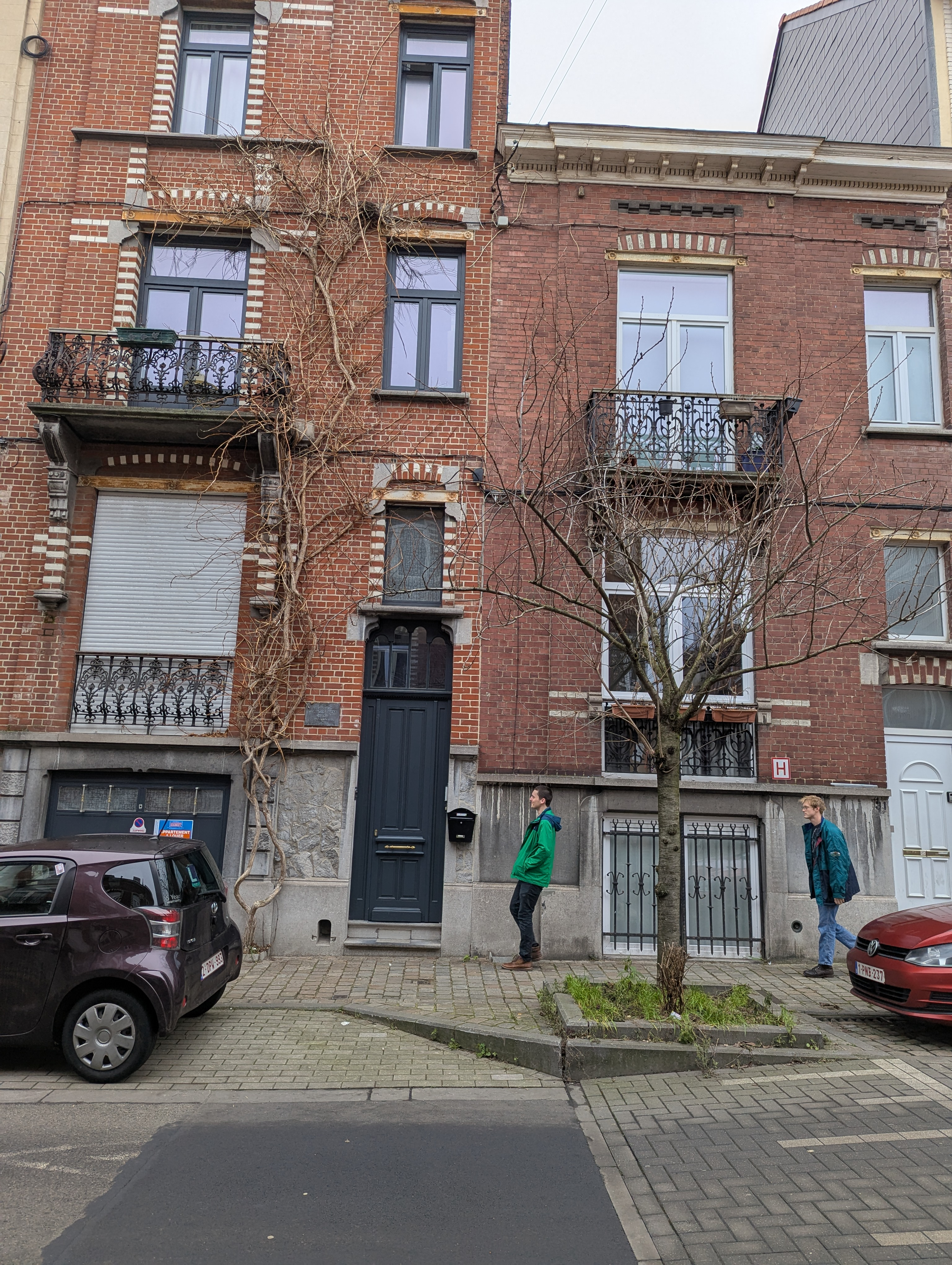
The house in Etterbeek where Hergé was born (33 Rue Philippe Baucq)

Georges Prosper Remi was born on 22 May 1907 in his parental home in Etterbeek, a central suburb in Brussels, the capital city of Belgium. His was a lower-middle-class family. His Walloon father, Alexis Remi, worked in a confectionery factory, whilst his Flemish mother, Elisabeth Dufour, was a housewife. Married on 18 January 1905, they moved into a house at 25 rue Cranz (now 33 rue Philippe Baucq), where Georges was born, although a year later they moved to a house at 34 rue de Theux. His primary language was his father's French, but growing up in the bilingual Brussels, he also learned Dutch, developing a Marollien accent from his maternal grandmother. A younger brother, Paul, was born five years after Georges. Like most Belgians, his family belonged to the Roman Catholic Church, though they were not particularly devout. He later characterised his life in Etterbeek as dominated by a monochrome grey, considering it extremely boring. Biographer Benoît Peeters suggested that this childhood melancholy might have been exacerbated through being sexually abused by a maternal uncle, Charles Arthur Dufour.

Remi developed a love of cinema, favouring Winsor McCay's Gertie the Dinosaur and the films of Charlie Chaplin, Harry Langdon and Buster Keaton; his later work in the comic strip medium displayed an obvious influence from them in style and content. Although not a keen reader, he enjoyed the novels of British and US authors, such as Huckleberry Finn, Treasure Island, Robinson Crusoe and The Pickwick Papers, as well as the novels of Frenchman Alexandre Dumas. Drawing as a hobby, he sketched out scenes from daily life along the edges of his school books. Some of these illustrations were of German soldiers, because his four years of primary schooling at the Ixelles Municipal School No. 3 coincided with World War I, during which Brussels was occupied by the German army. In 1919, his secondary education began at the secular Place de Londres in Ixelles, but in 1920 he was moved to Saint-Boniface School, an institution controlled by the archbishop where the teachers were Roman Catholic priests. Remi proved a successful student, being awarded prizes for excellence. He completed his secondary education in July 1925 at the top of his class.

My childhood was extremely ordinary. It happened in a very average place, with average events and average thoughts. For me, the poet's "green paradise" was rather gray ... My childhood, my adolescence, Boy Scouting, military service – all of it was gray. Neither a sad boyhood nor a happy one – rather a lackluster one.

— Hergé

Aged 12, Remi joined the Boy Scout brigade attached to Saint-Boniface School, becoming troop leader of the Squirrel Patrol and earning the name "Curious Fox" (Renard curieux). With the Scouts, he travelled to summer camps in Italy, Switzerland, Austria and Spain, and in the summer of 1923 his troop hiked 200 miles across the Pyrenees. His experiences with Scouting would have a significant influence on the rest of his life, sparking his love of camping and the natural world, and providing him with a moral compass that stressed personal loyalty and keeping one's promises.

His Scoutmaster, Rene Weverbergh, encouraged his artistic ability, and published one of Remi's drawings in the newsletter of the Saint-Boniface Scouts, Jamais Assez (Never Enough): his first published work. When Weverbergh became involved in the publication of Boy-Scout, the newsletter of the Federation of Scouts, he published more of Remi's illustrations, the first of which appeared in the fifth issue, from 1922. Remi continued publishing cartoons, drawings and woodcuts in subsequent issues of the newsletter, which was soon renamed Le Boy-Scout Belge (The Belgian Boy Scout). During this time, he experimented with different pseudonyms, using "Jérémie" and "Jérémiades" before settling on "Hergé", the French pronunciation of his reversed initials (R.G.) His work was first published under this name in December 1924.

=== Totor and early career: 1925–1928 ===
The Totor series was Hergé's first published comic strip.

Alongside his stand-alone illustrations, in July 1926 Hergé began production of a comic strip for Le Boy-Scout Belge, Les Aventures de Totor (The Adventures of Totor), which continued intermittent publication until 1929. Revolving around the adventures of a Boy Scout patrol leader, the comic initially featured written captions underneath the scenes, but Hergé began to experiment with other forms of conveying information, including speech balloons. Illustrations were also published in Le Blé qui lève (The Wheat That Grows) and other publications of the Catholic Action for the Belgian Youth (Action catholique de la jeunesse belge), and Hergé produced a book jacket for Weverbergh's novel, The Soul of the Sea. Being young and inexperienced, still learning his craft, Hergé sought guidance from an older cartoonist, Pierre Ickx, and together they founded the short-lived Atelier de la Fleur de Lys (AFL), an organisation for Christian cartoonists.

After graduating from secondary school in 1925, Hergé enrolled in the École Saint-Luc art school, but finding the teaching boring, he left after one lesson. He hoped for a job as an illustrator alongside Ickx at Le Vingtième Siècle (The Twentieth Century) – a conservative "Catholic Newspaper of Doctrine and Information" – but no positions were available. Instead he got a job in the paper's subscriptions department, starting in September 1925. Despising the boredom of this position, he enlisted for military service before he was called up, and in August 1926 was assigned to the Dailly barracks at Schaerbeek. Joining the first infantry regiment, he was also bored by his military training, but continued sketching and producing episodes of Totor.

Toward the end of his military service, in August 1927, Hergé met the editor of Le Vingtième Siècle, the Abbé Norbert Wallez, a vocal fascist who kept a signed photograph of the Italian Fascist leader Benito Mussolini on his desk. Impressed by Hergé's repertoire, Wallez agreed to give him a job as a photographic reporter and cartoonist for the paper, something for which Hergé always remained grateful, coming to view the Abbé as a father figure. Supplemented by commissions for other publications, Hergé illustrated a number of texts for "The Children's Corner" and the literary pages; the illustrations of this period show his interest in woodcuts and the early prototype of his ligne claire style.

=== Founding Tintin and Quick & Flupke: 1929–1932 ===
Beginning a series of newspaper supplements in late 1928, Wallez founded a supplement for children, Le Petit Vingtième (The Little Twentieth), which subsequently appeared in Le Vingtième Siècle every Thursday. Carrying strong Catholic and fascist messages, many of its passages were explicitly antisemitic. For this new venture, Hergé illustrated L'Extraordinaire Aventure de Flup, Nénesse, Poussette et Cochonnet (The Extraordinary Adventure of Flup, Nénesse, Poussette and Cochonnet), a comic strip authored by one of the paper's sport columnists, which told the story of two boys, one of their little sisters, and her inflatable rubber pig. Hergé was unsatisfied, and eager to write and draw a comic strip of his own. He was fascinated by new techniques in the medium – such as the systematic use of speech bubbles – found in such US comics as George McManus' Bringing Up Father, George Herriman's Krazy Kat and Rudolph Dirks's The Katzenjammer Kids, copies of which had been sent to him from Mexico by the paper's reporter Léon Degrelle, stationed there to report on the Cristero War.

The front page of the edition of 1 May 1930 of Le Petit Vingtième, declaring "Tintin Revient!" ("Tintin Returns!") from his adventure in the Soviet Union.

Hergé developed a character named Tintin as a Belgian boy reporter who could travel the world with his Fox Terrier, Snowy – "Milou" in the original French – basing him in large part on his earlier character of Totor and also on his own brother, Paul. Degrelle later falsely claimed that Tintin had been based on him, while he and Hergé fell out when Degrelle used one of his designs without permission; they settled out-of-court. Although Hergé wanted to send his character to the United States, Wallez instead ordered him to set his adventure in the Soviet Union, acting as a work of anti-socialist propaganda for children. The result, Tintin in the Land of the Soviets, began serialisation in Le Petit Vingtième on 10 January 1929, and ran until 8 May 1930. Popular in Francophone Belgium, Wallez organized a publicity stunt at the Gare de Nord station, following which he organized the publication of the story in book form. The popularity of the story led to an increase in sales, and so Wallez granted Hergé two assistants, Eugène Van Nyverseel and Paul "Jam" Jamin.

In January 1930, Hergé introduced Quick & Flupke (Quick et Flupke), a new comic strip about two street kids from Brussels, in the pages of Le Petit Vingtième. At Wallez's direction, in June he began serialisation of the second Tintin adventure, Tintin in the Congo, designed to encourage colonial sentiment towards the Belgian Congo. Authored in a paternalistic style that depicted the Congolese as childlike idiots, in later decades it would be accused of racism; however, at the time it was un-controversial and popular, with further publicity stunts held to increase sales. For the third adventure, Tintin in America, serialised from September 1931 to October 1932, Hergé finally got to deal with a scenario of his own choice, although he used the work to push an anti-capitalist, anti-consumerist agenda in keeping with the paper's ultra-conservative ideology. Although the Adventures of Tintin had been serialised in the French Catholic Cœurs Vaillants ("Brave Hearts") since 1930, he was soon receiving syndication requests from Swiss and Portuguese newspapers too. Though wealthier than most Belgians at his age, and despite increasing success, he remained an unfazed "conservative young man" dedicated to his work.

Hergé sought work elsewhere too, creating The Lovable Mr. Mops cartoon for the Bon Marché department store, and The Adventures of Tim the Squirrel Out West for the rival L'Innovation department store.

=== First marriage ===
At the offices of Le Petit Vingtième in 1928, Hergé met the woman who would become his first wife, Germaine Kieckens (1906 – 26 October 1995). A redhead described by Pierre Assouline as "elegant and popular", she had obtained work as the secretary for Norbert Wallez. At the time of her birth, her parents were relatively elderly and, having lost an earlier child, they were particularly overprotective of her. Greatly admiring Wallez, whom she looked up to as a father figure, she adopted his fascist political beliefs. She was appointed editor of Votre Vingtième, Madame, a supplement for women for which Hergé sometimes drew the cover. She also began writing articles for Le Petit Vingtième using the pseudonym Tantine. The first 500 copies of Tintin in the Land of the Soviets were numbered and signed by Hergé using Tintin's signature, with Snowy's paw print being drawn next to it by Kieckens.

In 1930, Hergé escorted her home from work almost every night, though she expressed little romantic interest in him at the time. Instead she desired an older, or more mature man, such as the Abbé himself. Wallez however encouraged the two to enter into a relationship, and one evening at the Taverne du Palace she indicated to Hergé that she would be interested in a relationship.

On 20 July 1932, Hergé and Kieckens were married; although neither of them was entirely happy with the union, they had been encouraged to do so by Wallez, who insisted that all his single staff married and who personally carried out the wedding ceremony at the Saint-Roch Church in Laeken. Spending their honeymoon in Vianden, Luxembourg, the couple moved into an apartment in the rue Knapen, Schaerbeek.

== Rising fame ==
=== Tintin in the Orient and Jo, Zette & Jocko: 1932–1939 ===
In November 1932 Hergé announced that the following month he would send Tintin on an adventure to Asia. Although initially titled The Adventures of Tintin, Reporter, in the Orient, it would later be renamed Cigars of the Pharaoh. A mystery story, the plot began in Egypt before proceeding to Arabia and India, during which the recurring characters of Thomson and Thompson and Rastapopoulos were introduced. Through his friend Charles Lesne, Hergé was hired to produce illustrations for the company Casterman, and in late 1933 they proposed taking over the publication of both The Adventures of Tintin and Quick and Flupke in book form, to which Hergé agreed; the first Casterman book was the collected volume of Cigars. Continuing to subsidise his comic work with commercial advertising, in January 1934 he also founded the "Atelier Hergé" advertising company with two partners, but it was liquidated after six months.

After Wallez was removed from the paper's editorship in August 1933 following a scandal, Hergé became despondent; in March 1934 he tried to resign, but was encouraged to stay after his monthly salary was increased from 2000 to 3000 francs and his workload was reduced, with Jamin taking responsibility for the day-to-day running of Le Petit Vingtième.

From February to August 1934 Hergé serialised Popol Out West in Le Petit Vingtième, a story using animal characters that was a development of the earlier Tim the Squirrel comic.

From August 1934 to October 1935, Le Petit Vingtième serialised Tintin's next adventure, The Blue Lotus, which was set in China and dealt with the recent Japanese invasion of Manchuria. Hergé had been greatly influenced in the production of the work by his friend Zhang Chongren, a Catholic Chinese student studying at Brussels' Académie Royale des Beaux-Arts, to whom he had been introduced in May 1934. Zhang gave him lessons in Taoist philosophy, Chinese art and Chinese calligraphy, influencing not only his artistic style, but also his general outlook on life. As a token of appreciation Hergé added a fictional "Chang Chong-Chen" to The Blue Lotus, a young Chinese boy who meets and befriends Tintin. For The Blue Lotus, Hergé devoted far more attention to accuracy, resulting in a largely realistic portrayal of China. As a result, The Blue Lotus has been widely hailed as "Hergé's first masterpiece" and a benchmark in the series' development. Casterman published it in book form, also insisting that Hergé include colour plates in both the volume and in reprints of America and Cigars. In 1936, they also began production of Tintin merchandise, something Hergé supported, having ideas of an entire shop devoted to The Adventures of Tintin, something that would come to fruition 50 years later. Nevertheless, while his serialised comics proved lucrative, the collected volumes sold less well, something Hergé blamed on Casterman, urging them to do more to market his books.

Jo, Zette and Jocko in Cœurs Vaillants

Hergé's next Tintin story, The Broken Ear (1935–1937), was the first for which the plot synopsis had been outlined from the start, being a detective story that took Tintin to South America. It introduced the character of General Alcazar, and also saw Hergé introduce the first fictional countries into the series, San Theodoros and Nuevo Rico, two republics based largely on Bolivia and Paraguay. The violent elements within The Broken Ear upset the publishers of Cœurs Vaillants, who asked Hergé to create a more child-appropriate story for them. The result was The Adventures of Jo, Zette, and Jocko, a series about a young brother and sister, plus their pet monkey and the parents. The series began with The Secret Ray, which was serialised in Cœurs Vaillants and then Le Petit Vingtième, and continued with The Stratoship H-22 and finally The Valley of the Cobras. Hergé nevertheless disliked the series, commenting that the characters "bored me terribly." Now writing three series simultaneously, Hergé was working every day of the year, and felt stressed.

The next Tintin adventure was The Black Island (1937–1938), which saw the character travel to Britain to battle counterfeiters and introduced a new antagonist, the German Dr. Müller. Hergé followed this with King Ottokar's Sceptre (1938–1939), in which Tintin saves the fictional Eastern European country of Syldavia from being invaded by its expansionist neighbour, Borduria; the event was an anti-fascist satire of Nazi Germany's expansion into Austria and Czechoslovakia. In May 1939, Hergé moved to a new house in Watermael-Boitsfort, although following the German invasion of Poland, he was conscripted into the Belgian army and temporarily stationed in Herenthout. Demobbed within the month, he returned to Brussels and adopted a more explicit anti-German stance when beginning his next Tintin adventure, Land of Black Gold, which was set in the Middle East and featured Dr. Müller sabotaging oil lines.

During this period, Hergé also contributed to L'Ouest (The West), a newspaper run by his friend Raymond De Becker. L'Ouest urged Belgium to remain neutral in World War II, a stance Hergé supported, creating the Mr Bellum strip to argue this position. Hergé was invited to visit China by Chinese Nationalist leader Chiang Kai-shek, who had enjoyed The Blue Lotus, although due to the political situation in Europe, this was not possible. He was re-mobilized in December, and stationed in Antwerp, from where he continued to send the Tintin strip to Le Petit Vingtième. However, he fell ill with sinusitis and boils and was declared unfit for military service in May 1940. That same day, Germany invaded Belgium. Le Vingtième Siècle was shut down, part way through the serialisation of Land of Black Gold.

=== German occupation and Le Soir: 1939–1945 ===
It is certain that Raymond De Becker sympathized with the National Socialist system, and on this point he was in agreement with Henri de Man. I admit that I believed myself that the future of the West could depend on the New Order. For many people democracy had proven deceptive, and the New Order brought fresh hope. In Catholic circles such views were widely held. Given everything that happened, it was naturally a terrible error to have believed even for an instant in the New Order.

— Hergé, 1973

As the Belgian Army clashed with the invading Germans, Hergé and his wife fled by car to France along with tens of thousands of other Belgians, first staying in Paris and then heading south to Puy-de-Dôme, where they remained for six weeks. On 28 May, King Leopold III of the Belgians surrendered the country to the German army to prevent further killing, a move that Hergé supported. He followed the king's request that all of those Belgians who had fled the country return, arriving back in Brussels on 30 June. There, he found that his house had been occupied as an office for the German army's Propagandastaffel, and also faced financial trouble, because he owed back taxes but was unable to access his financial reserves. All Belgian publications were now under the control of the German occupying force, who refused Le Petit Vingtième permission to continue publication. Instead, Hergé was offered employment as a cartoonist for Le Pays Réel by its editor, the Rexist Victor Matthys, but Hergé perceived Le Pays Réel as an explicitly political publication, and thus declined the position.

Consequently, he took up a position with Le Soir, Belgium's largest Francophone daily newspaper. Confiscated from its original owners, the German authorities had permitted Le Soir to be re-opened under the directorship of De Becker, although it remained firmly under Nazi control, supporting the German war effort and espousing antisemitism. After joining the Le Soir team on 15 October, Hergé was involved in the creation of a children's supplement, Soir-Jeunesse, aided by Jamin and Jacques Van Melkebeke. He relaunched The Adventures of Tintin with a new story, The Crab with the Golden Claws, in which Tintin pursued drug smugglers in North Africa; the story was a turning point in the series for its introduction of Captain Haddock, who would become a major character in the rest of the Adventures. This story, like the subsequent Adventures of Tintin published in Le Soir, rejected the political themes present in earlier stories, instead remaining firmly neutral. Hergé also included new Quick & Flupke gags in the supplement, as well as illustrations for serialised stories by Edgar Allan Poe and the Brothers Grimm.

In May 1941, a paper shortage led to the Soir-Jeunesse being reduced to four pages, with the length of the Tintin strip being cut by two thirds. Several weeks later the supplement disappeared altogether, with The Crab with the Golden Claws being moved into Le Soir itself, where it became a daily strip. While some Belgians were upset that Hergé was willing to work for a newspaper controlled by the occupying Nazi administration, he was heavily enticed by the size of Le Soir's readership, which reached 600,000. With Van Melkebeke, Hergé put together two Tintin plays. The first, Tintin in the Indies, appeared at Brussels' Theatre des Galeries in April 1941, while the second, Mr Boullock's Disappearance, was performed there in December. From October 1941 to May 1942, Le Soir serialised Hergé's next Tintin adventure, The Shooting Star, followed by publication as a single volume by Casterman. In keeping with Le Soir's editorial standpoint, The Shooting Star espoused an antisemitic and anti-American attitude, with the antagonist being a wealthy Jewish American businessman; it would thus prove particularly controversial in the post-war period, although Hergé denied any malicious antisemitic intention.

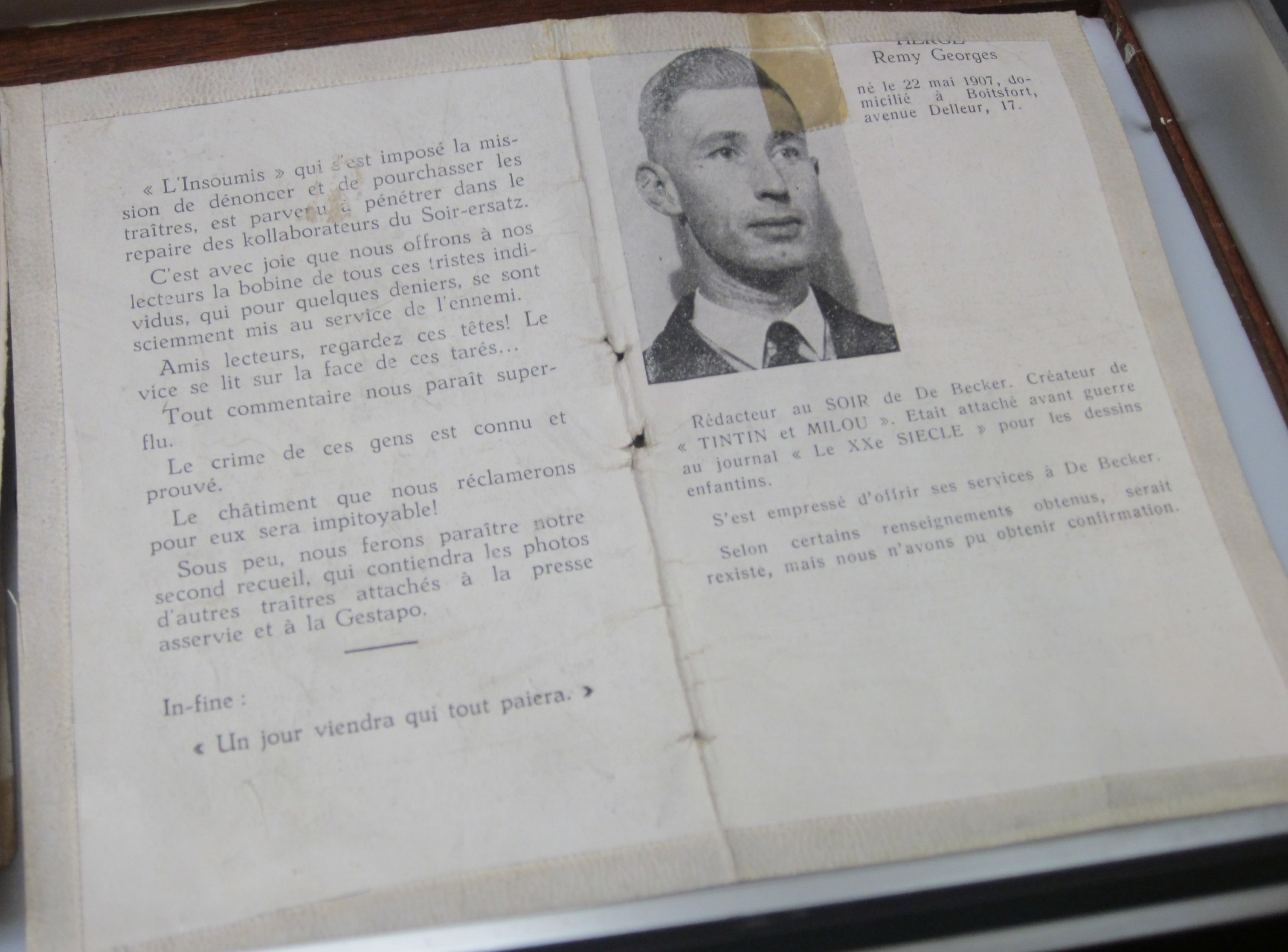
Booklet published by the resistance group L'Insoumis, denouncing Georges Remy [sic] as a collaborator. Hergé later admitted that "I hated the Resistance thing ... I knew that for every one of the Resistance's actions, hostages would be arrested and shot."

Casterman felt that the black-and-white volumes of The Adventures of Tintin were not selling as well as colour comic books, and thus that the series should be produced in colour. At the same time, Belgium was facing a paper-shortage, with Casterman wishing to cut down the volumes from 120-pages in length to 62. Hergé was initially sceptical, but ultimately agreed to their demands in February 1942. For these new editions, Casterman introduced a four-colour system, although Hergé insisted that colour should remain secondary to line, and that it would not be used for shading. To cope with this additional workload, Hergé approached a friend whom he had met through Van Melkebeke, Edgar P. Jacobs, to aid him as a cartoonist and colourist. Jacobs could only work on the project part-time, and so in March 1942, Hergé also employed a woman named Alice Devos to aid him. In July 1942, Hergé then procured an agent, Bernard Thièry, who took 40% of his commissions; their working relationship would be strained. With their assistance, from 1942 to 1947, Hergé adapted most of his previous Adventures of Tintin into 62-page colour versions.

Hergé's next Adventure of Tintin would be The Secret of the Unicorn, serialised in Le Soir from June 1942. He had collaborated closely with Van Melkebeke on this project, who had introduced many elements from the work of Jules Verne into the detective story, in which Tintin and Haddock searched for parchments revealing the location of hidden pirate treasure. The Secret of the Unicorn marked the first half of a story arc that was completed in Red Rackham's Treasure, serialised in Le Soir from February 1943; in this story, Tintin and Haddock search for the pirate's treasure in the Caribbean, with the character of Professor Calculus being introduced to the series. Following Red Rackham's Treasure, Hergé drew illustrations for a serialised story titled Dupont et Dupond, détectives ("Thomson and Thompson, Detectives"), authored by the newspaper's crime editor, Paul Kinnet.

In September 1943, De Becker was removed as editor of Le Soir for stating that although the Nazis were motivated "by undoubted good will, [they were also] extremely out of touch with reality". Although Hergé was close to De Becker, he decided to remain at the newspaper, which came under the editorship of Max Hodeige. In autumn 1943, Hergé had decided that he wanted Jacobs to collaborate with him on The Adventures of Tintin. Although initially hesitant, Jacobs eventually agreed, adopting the paid position in January 1944. Jacobs and Hergé became close collaborators and greatly influenced each other, while together they developed the plot for the next Adventure of Tintin, The Seven Crystal Balls, which began serialisation in Le Soir in December 1943.

=== Post-war controversy: 1944–1946 ===
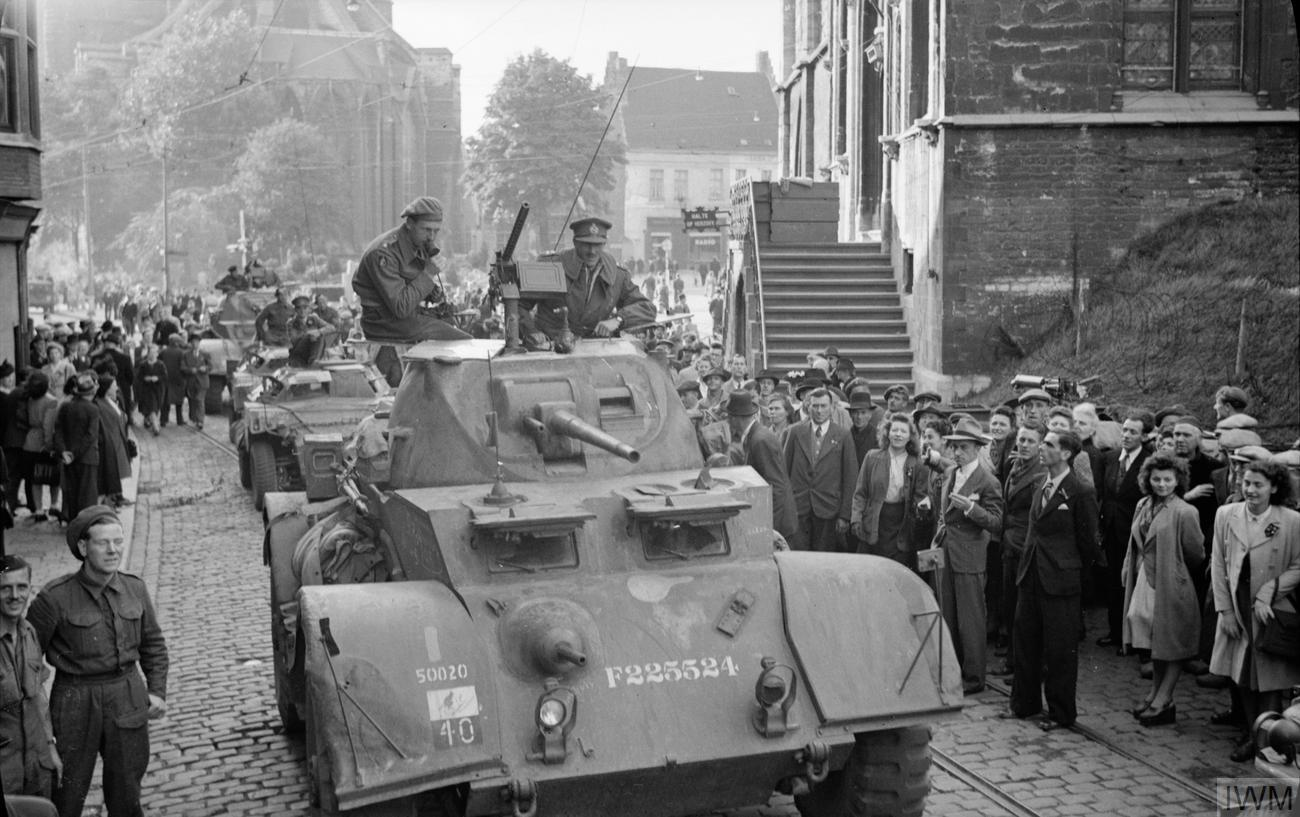
The Allied liberation of Belgium in September 1944 brought problems for Hergé.

As the Allied troops liberated Brussels from German occupation, Le Soir ceased publication on 2 September 1944, partway through its serialisation of The Seven Crystal Balls. Hergé was arrested on 3 September, having been named as a collaborator in a Resistance document known as the "Gallery of Traitors". This would be the first of four incidents in which Hergé was arrested – by the State Security, the Judiciary Police, the Belgian National Movement, and the Front for Independence respectively – during the course of which he spent one night in jail. On 5 September the entire staff of Le Soir were fired and a new editorial team introduced, while on 8 September the Supreme Headquarters Allied Expeditionary Force (SHAEF) issued a proclamation announcing that "any journalist who had helped produce a newspaper during the occupation was for the time being barred from practising his profession." Blacklisted, Hergé was now unemployed. Further, he was publicly lampooned as a collaborator by a newspaper closely associated with the Belgian Resistance, La Patrie, which issued a satirical strip titled The Adventures of Tintin in the Land of the Nazis.

The period witnessed widespread recriminations against accused collaborators, with military courts condemning 30,000 on minor charges and 25,000 on more serious charges; of those, 5,500 were sentenced to life imprisonment or capital punishment in Belgium. A judiciary inquiry into Hergé's case was launched by the deputy public prosecutor, Mr Vinçotte, although in his report he urged lenience, stating that "I am inclined to close the case. I believe it would bring ridicule on the judicial system to go after an inoffensive children's book author and illustrator. On the other hand, Hergé worked for Le Soir during the war, and his illustrations are what made people buy the newspaper." Although unable to work for the press, Hergé continued to re-draw and colour the older Adventures of Tintin for publication in book form by Casterman, completing the second version of Tintin in the Congo and starting on King Ottokar's Sceptre. Casterman supported Hergé throughout his ordeal, for which he always remained grateful. Attempting to circumvent his blacklisting, with Jacobs he began producing comics under the anonymous pseudonym of "Olav", but upon sending them to publishers found none who would accept them. Although this period allowed him an escape from the pressure of daily production which had affected most of his working life, he also had to deal with family problems: His brother Paul returned to Brussels from a German prisoner-of-war camp, while their mother had become highly delusional and was moved to a psychiatric hospital.

[During the occupation] I worked, just like a miner, a tram driver or baker! But, while one found it normal for an engineer to operate a train, members of the press were labelled as 'traitors'.

— Hergé

In October 1945, Hergé was approached by Raymond Leblanc, a former member of a conservative Resistance group, the National Royalist Movement, and his associates André Sinave and Albert Debaty. The trio were planning on launching a weekly magazine for children, and Leblanc – who had fond childhood memories of Tintin in the Land of the Soviets – thought Hergé would be ideal for it. Hergé agreed, and Leblanc obtained clearance papers for him, allowing him to work. Concerned about the judicial investigation into Hergé's wartime affiliations, Leblanc convinced William Ugeux, a leader of the Belgian Resistance who was now in charge of censorship and certificates of good citizenship, to look into the comic creator's file. Ugeux concluded that Hergé had been "a blunderer rather than a traitor" for his work at Le Soir. The decision as to whether Hergé would stand trial belonged to the general auditor of the Military Tribunal, Walter Jean Ganshof van der Meersch. He closed the case on 22 December 1945, declaring that "in regard to the particularly inoffensive character of the drawings published by Remi, bringing him before a war tribunal would be inappropriate and risky".

Now free from threat of prosecution, Hergé continued to support his colleagues at Le Soir who were being charged as collaborators; six of them were sentenced to death, and others to lengthy prison sentences. Among those sentenced to death was Hergé's friend, Jamin, although his sentence was commuted to life imprisonment. In May 1946, Hergé was issued a certificate of good citizenship, which became largely necessary to obtain employment in post-war Belgium. Celebrations were marred by his mother's death in April 1946; she was aged 60. Harry Thompson has described this post-war period as the "greatest upheaval" of Hergé's life. Hergé later described it as "an experience of absolute intolerance. It was horrible, horrible!" He considered the post-war trials of alleged collaborators a great injustice inflicted upon many innocent people, and never forgave Belgian society for the way that he had been treated, although he hid this from his public persona.

== Later life ==
=== Establishing Tintin magazine: 1946–1949 ===
The first issue of Tintin magazine included an image based upon Prisoners of the Sun.

Sinave devised the idea of naming their new magazine Tintin, believing that this would attract a wide audience. The Dutch-language edition produced for release in Belgium's Flemish north was titled Kuifje after the character's Dutch-language name. Adopting the slogan of "The Newspaper for the Young Aged 7 to 77", the magazine also used a logo featuring the Tintin character himself. The capital for the project had been put up by those involved: as executive director, Leblanc provided 50%, while its managing director Georges Lallemand provided 40% and Hergé, its artistic director, provided 10%. Hergé assembled a group of associates to aid him, including Van Melkebeke, Jacobs, Paul Cuvelier, and Jacques Laudy. Van Melkebeke was initially appointed editor-in-chief, although he was arrested for having worked for the collaborationist Le Nouveau journal shortly after, with his involvement in the project thus being kept secret so as to avoid further controversy. Van Melkebeke continued to provide work for the magazine under pseudonyms, although this ceased during his imprisonment from December 1947 to October 1949.

The first issue of Tintin magazine was published on 26 September 1946. Hergé was assigned to produce a two-page spread each week, and began by concluding The Seven Crystal Balls before embarking on its successor story, Prisoners of the Sun. Alongside Hergé's Adventures of Tintin, the magazine also included Laudy's The Legend of the Four Aymon Brothers and Jacobs' The Secret of the Swordfish, the first in his new Blake and Mortimer series. While the magazine was in competition with a number of rivals, most notably Spirou, famous for serialising the Lucky Luke and Buck Danny comics, it proved an immediate success, with 60,000 copies being sold in three days of its release. Its publication resulted in a massive boost to Hergé's book sales too.

In 1947, a Belgian film adaptation of The Crab with the Golden Claws was produced, and believing that cinematic adaptations were a good way to proceed, Hergé contacted Disney Studios in the United States; they declined his offer to adapt The Adventures of Tintin for the silver screen. In May 1947, the artistic collaboration between Hergé and Jacobs ended after an argument. Hergé had been jealous of the immediate success of Jacobs' Blake and Mortimer series, and had turned down Jacobs' request that he be credited as co-creator of the new Adventures of Tintin. That same month, Hergé broke from his manager, Thiery, after discovering that the latter had been siphoning off money for himself.

Many Belgians were highly critical of the magazine due to its connections with Hergé, who was still deemed a collaborator and traitor by many; Le Soir and La Cité publicly criticised the decision without referring to him by name while Le Quotidien and Le Drapeau Rouge specifically singled him out for denunciation. Hergé believed that the children's author Jeanne Cappe was behind many of these accusations, and threatened her with a lawsuit. Unhappy with life in Belgium, Hergé made plans to emigrate to Argentina, a nation that was welcoming many Europeans who had supported the defeated Axis powers and which had a thriving comic book scene. Ultimately, he changed his mind, for reasons that have remained unknown; it is possible that he was unable to secure any promise of work in the South American country.

I've just discovered ... that Tintin is no longer me, and that though he continued to live it is through a sort of artificial respiration that I must keep up constantly, and that is exhausting me more and more.

— Hergé, in a letter to his wife, 1947

In May, Hergé and Germaine holidayed near to Gland on Lake Geneva, Switzerland, where they were accompanied by a friend of theirs, a young woman named Rosane. During the holiday, Hergé and Rosane embarked on an extra-marital affair. He felt guilty, and returned to Brussels in June. Privately, he expressed the view that he had been led to commit such an act, which he viewed as immoral, through the influence of "amoral friends" with whom he was associating. Hoping to reignite the passion and stability of his marriage, he arranged to return to Switzerland with Germaine soon after; here they argued and embarked on a temporary separation. Remaining in Switzerland, he visited King Leopold III, who was then holidaying in Prégny, before briefly returning to Brussels in July. Back in Switzerland, he embarked on an affair with a married woman, although again informed Germaine before setting off to spend time in the Ardennes. In August, the couple sought to reunite by holidaying together in Brittany, but there they broke up again and Hergé returned to his lover in Switzerland. In September, he finally returned to Brussels, but he then spent time with his close friend Marcel Dehaye in a retreat at the Abbey of Notre-Dame-de-Scourmont. That month, he revived Land of Black Gold – the Adventure of Tintin that had been interrupted by the German invasion of 1940 – and began serialising it in Tintin magazine. However, the story was again interrupted, this time for 12 weeks as Hergé took a further unannounced holiday to Gland, greatly annoying many of his colleagues.

Although they retained respect for each other, Hergé's repeated absences had created a tense situation between himself and Leblanc. After a lengthy search, Leblanc had found a publisher willing to produce an edition of Tintin magazine in France: Georges Dargaud's Le Lombard, which began production of a French edition in October 1948. However, Hergé was unhappy that Leblanc had appointed André Frenez as Van Melkebeke's replacement as editor-in-chief, describing Frenez as "a cold functionary". Hergé was stubborn and uncompromising as the magazine's artistic director, known for strongly criticising the work of old friends like Pierre Ickx if he felt that they did not meet his exacting standards. He was particularly critical of the work of two of the newly hired staff at Tintin and Kuifje, Jacques Martin and Willy Vandersteen, encouraging them to change their artistic style to better reflect his own preferences. To Leblanc, he expressed the concern that most of those working at Tintin were better illustrators than storytellers. He also opined that Tintin was not keeping up with the times and what he perceived as the increased maturity of children, encouraging the magazine to better reflect current events and scientific developments.

=== Studios Hergé and Fanny Vlamynck: 1950–1965 ===
On 6 April 1950, Hergé established Studios Hergé as a public company. The Studios were based in his Avenue Delleur house in Brussels, with Hergé making a newly purchased country house in Céroux-Mousty his and Germaine's main residence. The Studios would provide both personal support to Hergé and technical support for his ongoing work. The Studio initially had only three employees; the staff would increase to 15, all of whom were working on Hergé's projects. He hired Bob de Moor as his primary apprentice at the Studios in March 1951. Impressed by Jacques Martin's work on The Golden Sphinx, Hergé persuaded Martin to join the Studios in January 1954; Martin insisted on bringing with him his own two assistants, Roger Leloup and Michel Demarets. During the early 1950s, a number of those convicted for collaborating with the Nazi occupiers were freed from prison. Sympathetic to their plight, Hergé lent money to some and aided others in getting jobs at Tintin magazine, much to Leblanc's annoyance. For instance, as well as lending him money, Hergé used his connections to secure Raymond de Becker a job in Switzerland as a book shop sales inspector. He also hired those associated with collaboration for his Studios; his new colourist, Josette Baujot, was the wife of a recently assassinated member of the Walloon Legion, and his new secretary, Baudouin van der Branden de Reeth, had served a prison sentence for working at Le Nouveau Journal during the occupation.

Hergé had developed the idea of setting an Adventure of Tintin on the moon while producing Prisoners of the Sun. He began serialisation of Destination Moon, the first of a two part arc followed by Explorers on the Moon, in Tintin magazine in March 1950. In September 1950, Hergé broke off the story, feeling the need for a break from work, having fallen back into clinical depression. He and Germaine went on holiday to Gland before returning to Brussels in late September. Many readers sent letters to Tintin asking why Explorers on the Moon was no longer being serialised, with a rumour emerging that Hergé had died. Explorers of the Moon would resume after an eighteen-month hiatus, returning in April 1952. Alongside his work on the new stories, Hergé also made use of the Studios in revising more of his early works.

In February 1952, Hergé was involved in a car crash in which Germaine's leg was shattered; she had to have a steel rod implanted in it, and used a wheelchair for several months. Their relationship was further strained when they received news of Wallez' death in September 1952. His friendship with Van Melkebeke also broke apart in this period, in part due to advice gained from an alleged clairvoyant, Bertje Jagueneau, upon whom both Hergé and Germaine were increasingly relying for guidance. In January 1955 a young woman named Fanny Vlamynck (fr) was hired as a colourist at the Studios. Hergé embarked on an extramarital affair with her in November 1956, with the rest of the studio staff soon finding out. Germaine grew suspicious of her husband's affections for Fanny, but was also experiencing a strong romantic attraction to her ballroom dance partner. Hergé and Germaine went on a cruise for the former's 50th birthday in May 1957, during which they visited Casablanca, Rabat, Palermo, and Rome. They went on a second holiday to Ostend in October. Following the trip to Ostend, he revealed his affair with Fanny to Germaine. He began experiencing traumatic dreams dominated by the colour white and, seeking to explain them, he visited Franz Ricklin, a psychoanalyst who was a student of Carl Jung in Zürich in May 1959. In February 1960, he returned to Switzerland, and upon his return to Brussels, he began renting an apartment in Uccle, away from Germaine. His relationship with Germaine had ended, although due to restrictions under Belgian law he was unable to obtain a divorce until 17 years later.

One of Hergé's abstract artworks

In September 1958, Tintin magazine moved its headquarters to a newly constructed building near the Gare du Midi. Hergé continued to feud with Leblanc over the direction of the magazine; his constant absences had led to him being replaced as artistic director, and he demanded that he be reinstated. Leblanc relented in early 1965, although Hergé soon departed to Sardinia for six weeks. In October 1965 Leblanc appointed the cartoonist Greg to be editor-in-chief of the magazine, believing him capable of reforming the paper to remain relevant to the youth of the day. By this point, Tintin magazine was at its commercial peak, with sales of 600,000 a week, although Hergé had lost much of his interest in it.

Supported by his studio, Hergé produced The Calculus Affair in 1954–1956 and The Red Sea Sharks in 1956–1957. Hergé's book sales were higher than ever, and translations were being produced for the British, Spanish, and Scandinavian markets. He was receiving international press attention, with articles on his work appearing in France-Observateur, The Listener, and The Times Literary Supplement. Paul Vandromme authored an uncritical book on Hergé, Le Monde de Tintin ("The World of Tintin"), published by Éditions Gallimard in 1959; Hergé vetoed the inclusion of a proposed preface by Roger Nimier after finding its praise for his own work too embarrassing. Radio adaptations of The Adventures of Tintin were produced, as was an animated cartoon series produced by Belvision Studios, Hergé's Adventures of Tintin. Two live-action films were also produced, Tintin and the Golden Fleece (1961) and Tintin and the Blue Oranges (1964), the former of which Hergé had been closely involved with.

Developing an interest in modern art, in the early 1960s Hergé befriended the art dealer Marcel Stal, owner of the Carrefour gallery in Brussels. He was a particular fan of the work of Constant Permeke, Jakob Smits, Lucio Fontana, and Jean-Pierre Raynaurd, as well as the pop art movement, in particular the work of Roy Lichtenstein. He built up his own personal collection, which consisted of both modern paintings as well as African art and Chinese ceramics. In 1962, Hergé decided he wanted to paint. He chose Louis Van Lint, one of the most respected Belgian abstract painters at the time, whose work he liked a lot, to be his private teacher. Hergé took up painting as a hobby, producing abstract art works which were influenced by the styles of Joan Miró and Serge Poliakoff. He showed his work to the art historian Léo Van Puyvelde, who was the chief conservator of the Musées des Beaux-Arts, who believed that they showed promise, but that Hergé's real talent lay with cartooning. Hergé abandoned painting shortly after, having produced 37 paintings in all. Spending less time on new Adventures of Tintin, from June to December 1965 Tintin magazine serialised a redrawn and newly coloured version of The Black Island prepared by staff at Studios Hergé.

=== Final years: 1966–1983 ===
An issue of Tintin magazine celebrating the 50th anniversary of The Adventures of Tintin (1979).

In the 1960s, Hergé became increasingly annoyed at the success of René Goscinny and Albert Uderzo's Asterix comic book series, which various commentators had described as eclipsing The Adventures of Tintin as the foremost comic in the Franco-Belgian tradition. Hoping to imitate the success of the recent animated films Asterix the Gaul (1967) and Asterix and Cleopatra (1968), Hergé agreed to the production of two animated Belvision films based on the Adventures of Tintin. The first, Tintin and the Temple of the Sun (1969), was based on pre-existing comics, whereas the second, Tintin and the Lake of Sharks (1972) was an original story written by Greg. In 1982, the US filmmaker Steven Spielberg requested the film rights for a live-action adaptation of one of The Adventures of Tintin, a prospect that excited Hergé, but the project would not come to fruition until long after his death.

In a wide-ranging interview with the journalist Numa Sadoul in October 1971, Hergé opened up about many of the problems he had experienced in his personal life. Sadoul planned to publish the interview as a book, but Hergé made many alterations to the transcript, both to improve its prose and to remove sections which cast him in a negative light. Editors at Casterman then removed even further sections, particularly those in which Hergé expressed a negative view of Catholicism. The interview was published as Tintin et moi ("Tintin and Me") in 1975. Hergé followed this by agreeing to be the subject of a documentary film produced by Henri Roane, Moi, Tintin ("I, Tintin"), which premiered in 1975. In January 1977 he attended an early comic book convention at Angoulême, where he was widely heralded as one of the masters of the discipline. To mark the fiftieth anniversary of The Adventures of Tintin in 1979, a celebratory event was held at Brussels' Hilton hotel, while an exhibit on "Le Musée imaginaire de Tintin" ("The Imaginary Museum of Tintin") was held at the Palais de Beaux-Arts.

In April 1971, Hergé visited the U.S. for the first time, primarily to visit a liver specialist in Rochester, Minnesota; however, on the trip, he also visited a Sioux reservation in South Dakota, but was shocked at the conditions in which their inhabitants lived. On this visit he also spent time in Chicago, San Francisco, Los Angeles, Las Vegas, and Kansas City. In April 1972, he travelled to New York City for an international conference on the strip cartoon, and there presented Mayor John Lindsay with a cartoon of Tintin visiting the city and also met with the pop artist Andy Warhol. Several years later, in 1977, Warhol visited Europe, where he produced a pop art portrait of Hergé. In April 1973, Hergé took up an invitation to visit Taiwan by the nation's government, in recognition of his promotion of Chinese culture in The Blue Lotus. During the visit he also spent time in Thailand and Bali.

Hergé had long sought to regain contact with his old friend Zhang Chongren, with whom he had lost contact. He regularly asked any Chinese people that he met if they knew of Zhang, and in 1979, had some success when a staff member in a Brussels Chinese restaurant revealed that he was Zhang's godson. Hergé was thus able to re-establish contact with his old friend. Journalist Gérard Valet organised for Zhang to visit Brussels so that he and Hergé could be re-united. The event took place in March 1981, and was heavily publicised; Hergé, however, found the situation difficult, disliking the press attention and finding that he and Zhang had grown distant during the intervening years.

In June 1970, Hergé's father died, and after the funeral he holidayed near Lake Geneva. In 1974, his assistant Branden suffered a stroke and was left unable to write, with Hergé replacing him with a young man, Alain Baran, who Hergé biographer Pierre Assouline later termed Hergé's "surrogate son". In March 1977, Hergé's divorce with Germaine was finalised; although Hergé continued to visit her and financially support her, Germaine took the divorce badly, viewing it as a further betrayal. Hergé was then able to marry Fanny several weeks later, in a low-key ceremony on 20 May; he was 70 years old and she was 42.

==== Death ====
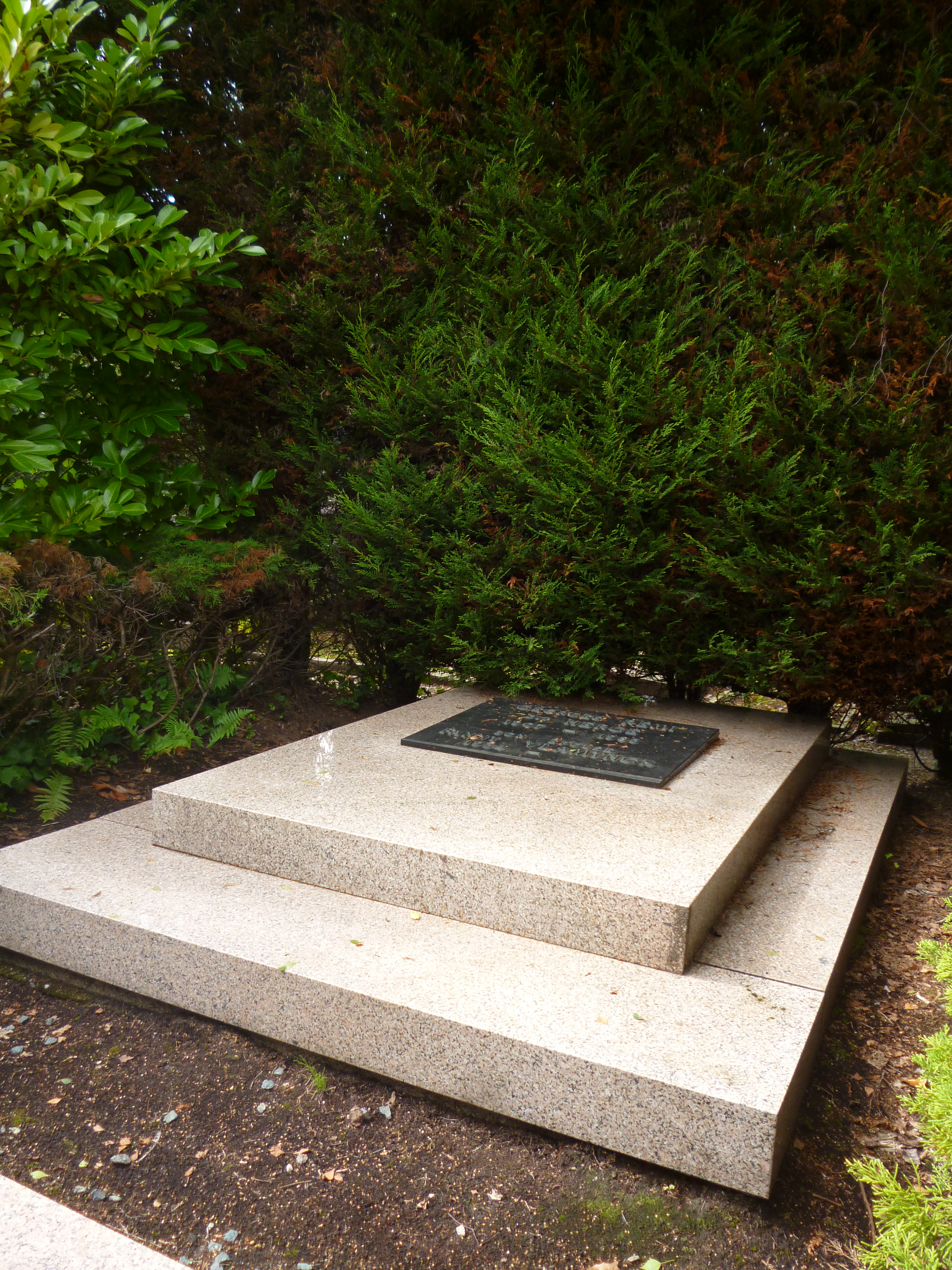
Hergé's grave in the Dieweg cemetery in Brussels.

In 1979, Hergé was diagnosed with osteomyelofibrosis, necessitating a complete blood transfusion. His need for blood transfusions had increased, as he came to require them every two weeks, and then every week.

On 25 February 1983, Hergé suffered cardiac arrest and was hospitalised in intensive care at Brussels' Cliniques universitaires Saint-Luc. He had been scheduled to meet with Steven Spielberg, who later made The Adventures of Tintin (2011). He died at Saint-Luc on 3 March, at the age of 75. His death received front page coverage in numerous francophone newspapers, including Libération and Le Monde. In his will, he had left Fanny as his sole heir.

In November 1986, Fanny closed Studios Hergé, replacing it with the Hergé Foundation.

In 1988, Tintin magazine was discontinued.

== Personal life ==
Hergé was a highly private person, being described by biographer Harry Thompson as "reserved [and] unostentatious". According to his biographer Pierre Sterckx, Hergé appeared "very conventional" in public, but in reality was "extremely erudite, with an insatiable curiosity, constantly on the watch". He greatly enjoyed walking in the countryside, gardening, and art collecting, and he was a fan of jazz music. Although he disliked making public or press appearances, Hergé insisted on personally responding to all fan mail received, which took up a considerable part of his time. He stated that "not replying to children's letters would be to betray their dreams." Friends described him as a humorous man, known particularly for his self-deprecating jokes. Colleagues described Hergé as egocentric, an assessment he agreed with. He was known to be authoritarian in dealing with his assistants and refused to share credit with them for their part in his work. Sterckx noted that "on the one hand he could be distant, even frosty, but on the other he was affectionate".

Throughout his first marriage he had a number of affairs with other women. He had no children, having been rendered sterile by radiation treatment, but in the 1950s offered to adopt his brother Paul's two children, Denise and George, when their parents were experiencing trouble in their relationship. Paul declined the offer, with Denise and George later noting that they had no great affection for their uncle, deeming him awkward around children. Hergé was raised as a Catholic, although he was never a devout practitioner of the religion. His adherence to Catholicism declined in later life as he developed a keen interest in Taoism, and became an agnostic. He was a fan of the Tao Te Ching and Arnaud Desjardins' The Path to Wisdom, as well as Fritjof Capra's The Tao of Physics and the work of Jean-Émile Charon.

=== Political views ===
Politically, Hergé was a fervent royalist, and remained so throughout his life, also believing in the unity of Belgium. In his early life, Hergé was "close to the traditional right-wing" of Belgian society, with Sterckx noting that through his work he was "plunged into rightist, even extreme right-wing circles". According to Harry Thompson, such political ideas were not unusual in middle-class circles in Belgium of the 1920s and early 1930s, where "patriotism, Catholicism, strict morality, discipline and naivety were so inextricably bound together in everyone's lives that right-wing politics were an almost inevitable by-product. It was a world view shared by everyone, distinguished principally by its complete ignorance of the world." When Hergé took responsibility for Le Petit Vingtième, he followed Wallez's instruction and allowed the newspaper to contain explicitly pro-fascist and anti-semitic sentiment. Literary critic Jean-Marie Apostolidès noted that the character of Tintin was a personification of the "New Youth" concept which was promoted by the European far-right. Under Wallez's guidance, the early Adventures of Tintin contained explicit political messages for its young readership. Tintin in the Land of the Soviets was a work of anti-socialist propaganda, while Tintin in the Congo was designed to encourage colonialist sentiment toward the Belgian Congo, and Tintin in America was designed as a work of anti-Americanism heavily critical of capitalism, commercialism, and industrialisation.

In contrast to Hergé's involvement in Belgium's right-wing, Sterckx thought the cartoonist to have been "a liberal and independent spirit", someone who was "the very opposite of a conservative [or] a reactionary of the right". Michael Farr asserted that Hergé had "an acute political conscience" during his earlier days, as exemplified by his condemnation of racism in the United States evident in Tintin in America. Literary critic Tom McCarthy went further, remarking that Tintin in America represented the emergence of a "left-wing counter tendency" in Hergé's work that rebelled against his right-wing milieu and which was particularly critical of wealthy capitalists and industrialists. This was furthered in The Blue Lotus, in which Hergé rejected his "classically right-wing" ideas to embrace an anti-imperialist stance, and in a contemporary Quick & Flupke strip in which he lampooned the far-right leaders of Germany and Italy, Adolf Hitler and Benito Mussolini. Although many of his friends and colleagues did so in the mid-1930s, Hergé did not join the far-right Rexist Party, later asserting that he "had always had an aversion to it" and commenting that "to throw my heart and soul into an ideology is the opposite of who I am."

=== Accusations of racism ===
Hergé faced repeated accusations of racism due to his portrayal of diverse ethnic groups throughout The Adventures of Tintin. According to McCarthy, in Tintin in the Congo Hergé represented the Congolese as "good at heart, but backwards and lazy, in need of European mastery". Thompson argued that Hergé had not written the book to be "deliberately racist" and that it reflected the average early 20th-century Belgian view of the Congolese, which was more patronising than malevolent. The book provoked no controversy at the time, coming to be perceived as racist only in the latter half of the 20th century.

In the following adventure, Tintin in America, Hergé depicted members of the Blackfoot tribe of Native Americans as "gullible, even naive", though it was nevertheless "broadly sympathetic" to their culture and plight, depicting their oppression at the hands of the United States Army. The Blue Lotus received both criticism for depicting the Japanese as militaristic and buck-toothed and praise for representing a less stereotypical vision of China than was the norm in Europe at the time.

Hergé has also been accused of utilising anti-semitic stereotypes, despite Hergé's protestations that the character of Rastapopoulos was Greek, and not Jewish.

From his early years, Hergé was openly critical of racism. He lambasted the pervasive racism of U.S. society in a prelude comment to Tintin in America published in Le Petit Vingtième on 20 August 1931, and ridiculed racist attitudes toward the Chinese in The Blue Lotus. Peeters asserted that "Hergé was no more racist than the next man", an assessment shared by Farr, who after meeting Hergé in the 1980s commented that "you couldn't have met someone who was more open and less racist". In contrast, Laurence Grove, president of the International Bande Dessinée Society, opined that Hergé adhered to prevailing societal trends in his work, noting, "When it was fashionable to be a Nazi, he was a Nazi. When it was fashionable to be a colonial racist, that's what he was." Discussing Tintin's racist elements, the Vietnamese-American novelist Viet Thanh Nguyen observed that "Hergé's work is deeply flawed, and yet riveting narratively and aesthetically. I have forgotten all the well-intentioned, moralistic children's literature that I have read, but I haven't forgotten Hergé."

== Legacy ==
Assouline described Hergé as "the personification of Belgium".

=== Awards and recognition ===
- 1971: Adamson Awards, Sweden
- 1972: Yellow Kid lifetime award ("una vita per il cartooning") at the Festival of Lucca
- 1973: Grand Prix Saint Michel of the city of Brussels
- 1999: Included in the Harvey Award Jack Kirby Hall of Fame
- 2003: Included in the Eisner Award Hall of Fame as the Judge's choice
- 2006: The Dalai Lama bestowed the International Campaign for Tibet's Light of Truth Award upon the character of Tintin.
- 2007: Selected as the main motif for a Belgian commemorative coin with a face value of €20 in honour of his 100th birthday.

According to the UNESCO's Index Translationum, Hergé is the ninth-most-often-translated French-language author, the second-most-often-translated Belgian author after Georges Simenon, and the second-most-often-translated French-language comics author behind René Goscinny. He also had an asteroid, 1652 Hergé, within the main belt, named after him in 1953.

=== In popular culture ===
An example of Hergé's cameo appearances in the 1990 television series The Adventures of Tintin.

A cartoon version of Hergé makes a number of cameo appearances in the 1990s animated television series The Adventures of Tintin. An animated version of Hergé also makes a cameo appearance at the start of the 2011 motion capture film, The Adventures of Tintin: The Secret of the Unicorn, directed by Steven Spielberg and produced by Peter Jackson, where he is depicted as a street cartoonist drawing a portrait of Tintin in the style of the comic at the start of the film.

=== Hergé Museum ===
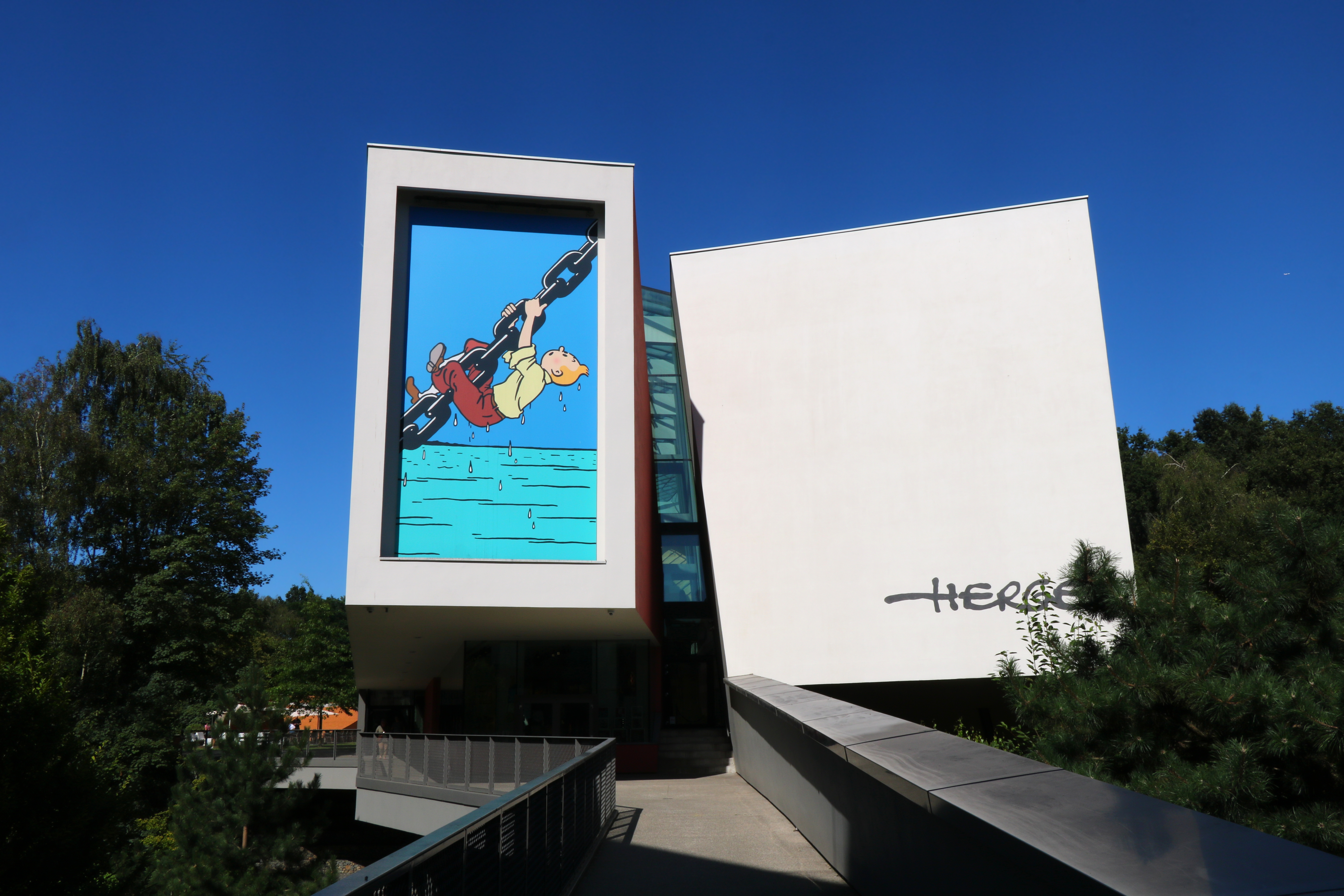
The Hergé Museum, in 2024.

The Musée Hergé is located in the centre of Louvain-la-Neuve, a city to the south of Brussels. This location was originally chosen for the museum in 2001. The futuristic building was designed by Pritzker Prize-winning French architect Christian de Portzamparc and cost €15 million to build. On the centenary of the birth of Hergé, 22 May 2007, the museum's first stone was laid. The museum opened its doors in June 2009.

The idea of a museum dedicated to the work of Hergé can be traced back to the end of the 1970s, when Hergé was still alive. After his death in 1983, Hergé's widow, Fanny, led the efforts, undertaken at first by the Hergé Foundation and then by the new Studios Hergé, to catalogue and choose the artwork and elements that would become part of the museum's exhibitions.

The Hergé Museum contains eight permanent galleries displaying original artwork by Hergé, and telling the story of his life and career which had not previously been visible to the public. The museum also houses a temporary exhibition gallery. Although Tintin features prominently in the museum, Hergé's other comic strip characters, such as Jo, Zette and Jocko, and Quick and Flupke, as well as his work as a graphic designer, are also present.

== Bibliography ==
Only the works marked * have been translated into English

Work	Year	Remarks
The Adventures of Totor	1926–1930	Hergé's first work, published in Le Boy Scout Belge, about a brave scout. 26 pages.
Flup, Nénesse, Poussette and Piglet	1928	Written by Armand De Smet, a sports reporter, published in Le Petit Vingtième. 18 pages.
Le Sifflet strips	1928–1929	One-page strips drawn by Hergé for the Le Sifflet satirical paper. 7 pages.
The Adventures of Tintin *	1929–1983	24 volumes, one unfinished.
Quick & Flupke *	1930–1940	12 volumes, 11 translated to English.
Fred and Mile	1931	2 pages.
The Adventures of Tim the Squirrel out West	1931	32 pages.
The Amiable Mr. Mops	1932	8 pages.
The Two Methods	1932	Published in Boy-Scout belge. 2 pages.
The Adventures of Tom and Millie	1933	Two stories written. 20 pages.
Popol Out West *	1934	1 volume.
Dropsy	1934	6 pages.
The Adventures of Jo, Zette and Jocko *	1936–1957	5 volumes.
The Misadventures of Jef Debakker	1937	A short series Hergé made for his small advertising company Atelier Hergé. 4 pages.
Mr. Bellum	1939	4 pages.
Thompson and Thomson, Detectives	1943	Story written by Paul Kinnet, appeared in Le Soir, illustrated by Hergé.
"Olav" stories	1944	Pilot pages made in collaboration with Edgar P. Jacobs, under the pseudonym "Olav". 3 pages.
They Explored the Moon	1969	A short comic charting the Moon landings published in Paris Match. 4 pages.
