= Poussette =

Poussette may refer to:

- a character in Flup, Nénesse, Poussette and Cochonnet, a minor comic by Hergé
- a character in Manon, an opéra comique in five acts by Jules Massenet
