= Minor comics by Hergé =

Short-lived comics by Belgian cartoonist Hergé

Hergé, the Belgian comics author best known for The Adventures of Tintin, also created a number of short-lived, lesser-known comic strips.

== Flup, Nénesse, Poussette and Piglet ==
L'Extraordinaire Aventure de Flup, Nénesse, Poussette et Cochonnet (The Extraordinary Adventure of Flup, Nénesse, Poussette and Cochonnet) was a comic strip drawn by Hergé but written by sports reporter Armand De Smet. It was about a boy, his friend, his little sister and her toy inflatable pig. It was published in Le Petit Vingtième from November 1, 1928, to March 7, 1929. The series was published in text comics format, but despite putting text below the images the characters still made use of speech balloons.

== Le Sifflet strips ==
Le Sifflet (The Catcall) was a satirical Brussels weekly paper for which Hergé drew seven one-page shorts from December 1928 to May 1929. The first two, published on pages 6 and 7 of Le Sifflet's 30 December 1928 issue, were the very first strips Hergé drew in the American style which used word balloons instead of the traditional European text comics style of captions under the panels. One of them was called Year's End Feast! (French: Réveillon!) and was about an oyster restaurant where the customers got defrauded. The other of those first two American-style strips was The Innocent Little Child's Christmas (French: La Noël du petit enfant sage) which was about a little Belgian boy (who resembles Tintin) and his foolish white terrier (who looks identical to Snowy). He published five more similar strips within the next six months.

== Fred and Mile ==
Fred and Mile — first page of Forewarned is Forearmed!

Fred and Mile (French: Fred et Mile) is a comic strip created in 1931. Hergé drew it for the Catholic newspaper Mon Avenir (My Future), a paper meant for future members of a Catholic action group. Only one strip was published, called Forewarned is Forearmed! (French: Un prévenu en vaut deux!, literally "A forewarned person is worth two [others]").

Fred and Mile are two boys who very closely resemble the protagonists of Hergé's Quick & Flupke series. The final frame of Fred and Mile is almost identical to the final frame in the Quick & Flupke gag Unbreakable.

== The Adventures of Tim the Squirrel out West ==
The Adventures of Tim the Squirrel out West (French: Les aventures de "Tim" l'écureuil au Far-West) is a promotional series created in late 1931. Two pages were published each week from September 17, 1931, to December 31, 1931, in the free Thursday newspaper available at the Brussels department store L'Innovation. The story involves Tim, his fiancée Millie, and also their aged uncle Pad; this serial was also the first draft of what would become The Adventures of Tom and Millie in 1933, and then Popol out West a year later. The 32 pages of this adventure were not written in the same format Hergé commonly used; instead they were written as text comics, with the text beneath the illustrations, a format he had employed previously with Totor and would later use with Dropsy.

== The mesadventures of Jef Debakker ==
The mesadventures of Jef Debakker was another short-lived series of four pages, about a baker ("De bakker" in Dutch), for Union, a coal seller in Brussels. It appeared in 1937.

== The Amiable Mr. Mops ==
The Amiable Mr. Mops

The Amiable Mr. Mops (French: Cet aimable M. Mops) is a short series which revolves around the funny escapades of the title character, Mr. Mops. There are only eight stories in all, each only a page in length. Hergé drew them for the 1932 edition of the Le Bon Marché (a department store) catalogue. Looking at the brief episodes it is easy to tell that Mr. Mops is based on none other than the silent movie star Charlie Chaplin, of whom Hergé was a great admirer. This short experimental work closely resembles the exploits of Quick & Flupke, though it is not long enough to allow the main character to develop any real depth.

Mr. Mops makes a cameo appearance in one of the short Quick & Flupke gags, "Innocence".

== The Adventures of Tom and Millie ==
The Adventures of Tom and Millie (French: Les Aventures de Tom et Millie) is a series created in 1933, consisting of two short adventures based on The Adventures of Tim the Squirrel out West. They were originally published in a leaflet called Pim et Pom, which was part of the children's supplement to the daily paper La Meuse, or Pim - Vie heureuse. For this series Hergé used the pseudonym "RG", his initials reversed, which was how he derived his usual pen-name. Tom and Millie share no noticeable differences from the heroes of the later album Popol out West, Popol and Virginia; and their adventures definitely played a key part in the formation of that story.

=== Stories ===
1. Where There's a Will There's a Way (French: Qui veut la fin veut les moyens, literally "Who wills the ends wills the means"): this two page story was published in black and white in the first issue of Pim et Pom on the Wednesday 13 December 1932.

2. Tom and Millie in Search of the Sun (French: Tom et Millie à la recherche du soleil): this last story, 18 pages long, was published with limited color in Pim et Pom every Tuesday from 20 December 1932 until 14 February 1933.

Millie is very sick, and the doctor tells Tom that she needs to be taken out in the sunshine on a journey across the plains if she is to be cured. So Tom and Millie set out across the African plains where they encounter lions, a fierce tribe of monkeys, and a camel caravan of Berbers.

Several parts of this story were used again in Popol out West. For example, the scene where Popol scares a mountain lion off with a magnifying glass was taken from a scene is this story in which Tom scares an African lion with the same method. Also many of the scenes in Popol out West where Popol is fighting against the Bunnokees were copied frame for frame from Tom and Millie where Tom is fighting against a tribe of monkeys.

== Dropsy ==
From left to right: Antoinette, Antoine, Dropsy and Splash

Dropsy was a short series created in 1934 as an advertisement for Antoine, sweet goods confectioners. The extremely short stories surround the adventures in a fantasy-like world of a boy called Antoine, a girl named Antoinette, their dog Splash, and Dropsy, a parrot. Though heavily bogged down with advertising it is still a very charming story which is seen as a fore-runner to Hergé's later series Jo, Zette and Jocko. Also, like Hergé's first work, Totor, it is presented with narration under the drawings, a very early format of the European comic strip.

The series consists of six one-page episodes: "The Crystal Ball", "The Amazing Flowers", "Dropsy the Prisoner", "The Siren Ondina and Her Dwarves", "The Coronation of Antoine and Antoinette", and "New Capers of Dropsy and Splash".

== Mr. Bellum ==
Mr. Bellum (French: Monsieur Bellum - "Bellum" is Latin for "War") was an pacifist series published after the start of World War II while Belgium was still a neutral country and before the German occupation of Belgium.

The series ran to just four strips, which were published in the neutral weekly newspaper L'Ouest from 7 to 29 December 1939, just a few months before the German invasion of Belgium. The strip centered on a middle-aged, middle-class Belgian, Mr. Bellum, and ridiculed the Belgian policy of neutrality as well as Adolf Hitler personally. The series was halted when Hergé was called up for military service in northern Belgium and posted to an infantry company as a reservist.

The series was reprinted in the book Tintin et Moi: Entretiens avec Hergé.

== They Explored the Moon ==
They Explored the Moon was a one-off comic of four pages, released in 1969 to commemorate the second landing on the Moon by Apollo 12. It was initially published in black and white in the Paris Match magazine (No. 1073, 29 Novembre 1969, pp. 30–33) five days after the return of the crew to Earth, and was later released as part of a hardback book. On the front cover is an image of Tintin and his friends welcoming the Apollo 11 crew (or, more specifically, Neil Armstrong) onto the Moon, as a joke that Tintin reached the Moon years before in the book Explorers on the Moon.
