= Tintin in the Land of the Soviets =

Comic album by Belgian cartoonist Hergé

Tintin in the Land of the Soviets (Tintin au pays des Soviets)
- Cover of the English edition
- Date: 1930
- Series: The Adventures of Tintin
- Publisher: Le Petit Vingtième

Creative team
- Creator: Hergé

Original publication
- Published in: Le Petit Vingtième
- Date of publication: 10 January 1929 – 8 May 1930
- Language: French

Translation
- Publisher: Sundancer
- Date: 1989
- Translator: Leslie Lonsdale-Cooper; Michael Turner

Chronology
- Followed by: Tintin in the Congo (1931)

Tintin in the Land of the Soviets (French: Tintin au pays des Soviets) is the first volume of The Adventures of Tintin, the comics series by Belgian cartoonist Hergé. Commissioned by the conservative Belgian newspaper Le Vingtième Siècle as anti-communist satire for its children's supplement Le Petit Vingtième, it was serialised weekly from January 1929 to May 1930 before being published in a collected volume by Éditions du Petit Vingtième in 1930. The story tells of young Belgian reporter Tintin and his dog Snowy, who are sent to the Soviet Union to report on Stalin's government. Knowing of his intentions, however, the secret police of the OGPU are sent to hunt him down.

Bolstered by publicity stunts, Land of the Soviets was a commercial success in Belgium, and also witnessed serialisation in France and Switzerland. Hergé continued The Adventures of Tintin with Tintin in the Congo, and the series became a defining part of the Franco-Belgian comics tradition. Damage to the original plates prevented republication of the book for several decades, while Hergé later expressed embarrassment at the crudeness of the work. As he began to redraw his earlier Adventures in second, colour versions from 1942 onward, he decided against doing so for Land of the Soviets; it was the only completed Tintin story that Hergé did not reproduce in colour. Growing demand among fans of the series resulted in the production of unauthorised copies of the book in the 1960s, with the first officially sanctioned republication appearing in 1969, after which it was translated into several other languages, including English. Critical reception of the work has been largely negative, and several commentators on The Adventures of Tintin have described Land of the Soviets as one of Hergé's weakest works.

== Synopsis ==
A panel showing Tintin and Snowy in a train heading for the Soviet Union.

Tintin, a reporter for Le Petit Vingtième, is sent with his dog Snowy on an assignment to the Soviet Union, departing from Brussels. En route to Moscow, an agent of the OGPU—the Soviet secret police—sabotages the train and declares the reporter to be a "dirty little bourgeois". The Berlin Police indirectly blame Tintin for the bombing but he escapes to the border of the Soviet Union. Following closely, the OGPU agent finds Tintin and brings him before the local Commissar's office, instructing the Commissar to make the reporter "disappear ... accidentally". Escaping again, Tintin finds "how the Soviets fool the poor idiots who still believe in a Red Paradise" by burning bundles of straw and clanging metal in order to trick visiting English Marxists into believing that non-operational Soviet factories are productive.

Tintin witnesses a local election, where the Bolsheviks threaten the voters to ensure their own victory; when they try to arrest him, he dresses as a ghost to scare them away. Tintin attempts to make his way out of the Soviet Union, but the Bolsheviks pursue and arrest him, then threaten him with torture. Escaping his captors, Tintin reaches Moscow, remarking that the Bolsheviks have turned it into "a stinking slum". He and Snowy observe a government official handing out bread to homeless Marxists but denying it to their opponents; Snowy steals a loaf and gives it to a starving boy. Spying on a secret Bolshevik meeting, Tintin learns that all the Soviet grain is being exported abroad for propaganda purposes, leaving the people starving, and that the government plans to "organise an expedition against the kulaks, the rich peasants, and force them at gunpoint to give us their corn".

Tintin infiltrates the Red Army and warns some of the kulaks to hide their grain, but the army catches him and sentences him to death by firing squad. By planting blanks in the soldiers' rifles, Tintin fakes his death and is able to make his way into the snowy wilderness, where he discovers an underground Bolshevik hideaway in a haunted house. A Bolshevik then captures him and informs him, "You're in the hideout where Lenin, Trotsky and Stalin have collected together wealth stolen from the people!" With Snowy's help, Tintin escapes, commandeers a plane, and flies into the night. The plane crashes, but Tintin fashions a new propeller from a tree using a penknife, and continues to Berlin. The OGPU agents appear and lock Tintin in a dungeon, but he escapes with the aid of Snowy, who has dressed himself in a tiger costume. The last OGPU agent attempts to kidnap Tintin, but this attempt is foiled, and the agent was sent to the Berlin police, where his plan of blowing up all the capitals of Europe with dynamite was exposed. Tintin returns to Brussels amidst a huge popular reception.

== History ==
=== Background ===
The idea for the character of Tintin and the sort of adventures that would befall him came to me, I believe, in five minutes, the moment I first made a sketch of the figure of this hero: that is to say, he had not haunted my youth nor even my dreams. Although it's possible that as a child I imagined myself in the role of a sort of Tintin

— Hergé, 15 November 1966.

Georges Remi—best known under the pen name Hergé—had been employed as an illustrator at Le Vingtième Siècle ("The Twentieth Century"), a staunchly Roman Catholic and conservative Belgian newspaper based in Hergé's native Brussels. Run by the Abbé Norbert Wallez, the paper described itself as a "Catholic Newspaper for Doctrine and Information" and disseminated a far-right and fascist viewpoint; Wallez was an admirer of Italian fascist leader Benito Mussolini and kept a signed picture of him on his desktop, while Léon Degrelle, who later became the leader of the fascist Rexists, worked as a foreign correspondent for the paper. According to Harry Thompson, such political ideas were common in Belgium at the time, and Hergé's milieu was permeated with conservative ideas revolving around "patriotism, Catholicism, strict morality, discipline, and naivety". Anti-communist sentiment was strong, and a Soviet exhibition held in Brussels in January 1928 was vandalised amid demonstrations by the fascist National Youth Movement (Jeunesses nationales) in which Degrelle took part.

Wallez appointed Hergé editor of a children's supplement for the Thursday issues of Le Vingtième Siècle, titled Le Petit Vingtième ("The Little Twentieth"). Propagating Wallez's socio-political views to its young readership, it contained explicitly pro-fascist and anti-Semitic sentiment. In addition to editing the supplement, Hergé illustrated L'extraordinaire aventure de Flup, Nénesse, Poussette et Cochonnet ("The Extraordinary Adventures of Flup, Nénesse, Poussette and Cochonnet"), a comic strip authored by a member of the newspaper's sport staff, which told the adventures of two boys, one of their little sisters, and her inflatable rubber pig. Hergé became dissatisfied with mere illustration work, and wanted to write and draw his own cartoon strip.

Hergé already had experience creating comic strips. From July 1926 he had written a strip about a boy scout patrol leader titled Les Aventures de Totor C.P. des Hannetons ("The Adventures of Totor, Scout Leader of the Cockchafers") for the Scouting newspaper Le Boy Scout Belge ("The Belgian Boy Scout"). The character of Totor was a strong influence on Tintin; Hergé described the latter as being like Totor's younger brother. Jean-Marc and Randy Lofficier stated that graphically, Totor and Tintin were "virtually identical" except for the scout uniform, also noting many similarities between their respective adventures, particularly in the illustration style, the fast pace of the story, and the use of humour. Hergé also had experience creating anti-communist propaganda, having produced a number of satirical sketches for Le Sifflet in October 1928 titled "70 per cent of Communist chefs are odd ducks".

=== Influences ===
Hergé wanted to set Tintin's first adventure in the United States in order to involve Native Americans—a people who had fascinated him since boyhood—in the story. Wallez rejected this idea, which later saw realisation as the series' third instalment, Tintin in America (1932). Instead, Wallez wanted Hergé to send Tintin to the Soviet Union, founded in 1922 by the Bolshevik Party after seizing power from the Russian Empire during the 1917 October Revolution. The Bolsheviks greatly changed the country's feudal society by nationalising industry and replacing a capitalist economy with a socialist one. By the early 1920s, the Soviet Union's first leader, Vladimir Lenin, had died and been succeeded by Joseph Stalin. Being both Roman Catholic and politically right-wing, Wallez was opposed to the atheist, anti-sectarian, anti-theocratic and left-wing Soviet policies, and wanted Tintin's first adventure to reflect this, to persuade its young readers with anti-Marxist and anti-communist ideas. Later commenting on why he produced a work of propaganda, Hergé said that he had been "inspired by the atmosphere of the paper", which taught him that being a Catholic meant being anti-Marxist, and since childhood he had been horrified by the Bolshevik shooting of the Romanov family in July 1918.

Bolsheviks force people to vote for them at gunpoint in a scene appropriated from Joseph Douillet's Moscou sans voiles (1928).

Hergé did not have the time to visit the Soviet Union or to analyse any available published information about it. Instead, he obtained an overview from a single book, Moscou sans Voiles: Neuf ans de travail au pays des Soviets ("Moscow Unveiled: Nine Years' Work in the Land of the Soviets") by Joseph Douillet (1878–1954), a former Belgian consul to Rostov-on-Don who had spent nine years in Russia following the 1917 revolution. Published in both Belgium and France in 1928, Moscou sans voiles sold well to a public eager to believe Douillet's anti-Bolshevik claims, many of which were of doubtful accuracy. As Michael Farr noted, "Hergé freely, though selectively, lifted whole scenes from Douillet's account", including "the chilling election episode", which was "almost identical" to Douillet's description in Moscou sans voiles. Hergé's lack of knowledge about the Soviet Union led to many factual errors; the story contains references to bananas, Shell petrol and Huntley & Palmers biscuits, none of which existed in the Soviet Union at the time. He also made errors in Russian names, typically adding the Polish ending "-ski" to them, rather than the Russian equivalent "-vitch".

In creating Land of the Soviets, Hergé was influenced by innovations within the comic strip medium. He claimed a strong influence from French cartoonist Alain Saint-Ogan, producer of the Zig et Puce series. The two met the following year, becoming lifelong friends. He was also influenced by the contemporary American comics that reporter Léon Degrelle had sent back to Belgium from Mexico, where he was stationed to report on the Cristero War. These American comics included George McManus's Bringing Up Father, George Herriman's Krazy Kat and Rudolph Dirks's Katzenjammer Kids. Farr believed that contemporary cinema influenced Tintin in the Land of the Soviets, indicating similarities between scenes in the book with the police chases of the Keystone Cops films, the train chase in Buster Keaton's The General and with the expressionist images found in the works of directors such as Fritz Lang. Farr summarised this influence by commenting: "As a pioneer of the strip cartoon, Hergé was not afraid to draw on one modern medium to develop another".

=== Publication ===
Original French edition (1930).

Prior to serialisation, an announcement ran in the 4 January 1929 edition of Le Petit Vingtième, proclaiming: "[W]e are always eager to satisfy our readers and keep them up to date on foreign affairs. We have therefore sent Tintin, one of our top reporters, to Soviet Russia". The illusion of Tintin as a real reporter for the paper, and not a fictional character, was emphasised by the claim that the comic strip was not a series of drawings, but composed of photographs taken of Tintin's adventure. Biographer Benoît Peeters thought this a private joke between staff at Le Petit Vingtième; alluding to the fact that Hergé had originally been employed as a photojournalist, a job that he never fulfilled. Literary critic Tom McCarthy later compared this approach to that of 18th-century European literature, which often presented fictional narratives as non-fiction.

The front page of the 1 May 1930 edition of Le Petit Vingtième, declaring "Tintin Revient!" ("Tintin Returns!") from his adventure in the Soviet Union.

The first instalment of Tintin in the Land of the Soviets appeared in the 10 January 1929 edition of Le Petit Vingtième, and ran weekly until 8 May 1930. Hergé did not plot out the storyline in advance; he improvised new situations on a weekly basis, leaving Jean-Marc and Randy Lofficier to observe that both "Story-wise and graphically, Hergé was learning his craft before our eyes." Hergé admitted that the work was rushed, saying: "The Petit Vingtième came out on Wednesday evening, and I often didn't have a clue on Wednesday morning how I was going to get Tintin out of the predicament I had put him in the previous week". Michael Farr considered this evident, remarking that many drawings were "crude, rudimentary, [and] rushed", lacking the "polish and refinement" that Hergé would later develop. Contrastingly, he thought that certain plates were of the "highest quality" and exhibited Hergé's "outstanding ability as a draughtsman".

The story was an immediate success among its young readers. As Harry Thompson remarked, the plotline would have been popular with the average Belgian parent, exploiting their anti-communist sentiment and feeding their fears regarding the Russians. The series' popularity led Wallez to organise publicity stunts to boost interest. The first of these was the April Fools' Day publication of a faked letter purporting to be from the OGPU (Soviet secret police) confirming Tintin's existence, and warning that if the paper did not cease publication of "these attacks against the Soviets and the revolutionary proletariat of Russia, you will meet death very shortly".

The second was a staged publicity event, suggested by the reporter Charles Lesne, which took place on Thursday 8 May 1930. During the stunt, the 15-year-old Lucien Pepermans, a friend of Hergé's who had Tintin's features, arrived at Brussels' Gare du Nord railway station aboard the incoming Liège express from Moscow, dressed in Russian garb as Tintin and accompanied by a white dog; in later life Hergé erroneously claimed that he had accompanied Pepermans, whereas it had been Julien De Proft. A crowd of fans greeted Pepermans and De Proft and pulled the Tintin impersonator into their midst. Proceeding by limousine to the offices of Le Vingtième Siècle, they were greeted by further crowds, largely of Catholic Boy Scouts; Pepermans gave a speech on the building's balcony, before gifts were distributed to fans.

From 26 October 1930, Tintin in the Land of the Soviets was syndicated to French Catholic magazine Cœurs Vaillants ("Brave Hearts"), recently founded by the Abbé Gaston Courtois. Courtois had travelled to Brussels to meet Wallez and Hergé, but upon publication thought that his readers would not understand the speech bubble system, adding explanatory sentences below each image. This angered Hergé, who unsuccessfully "intervened passionately" to stop the additions. The publication was highly significant for initiating Hergé's international career. The story was also reprinted in its original form in L'écho illustré, a Swiss weekly magazine, from 1932 onward. Recognising the continued commercial viability of the story, Wallez published it in book form in September 1930 through the Brussels-based Éditions du Petit Vingtième at a print run of 10,000, each sold at twenty francs. The first 500 copies were numbered and signed by Hergé using Tintin's signature, with Snowy's paw print drawn on by Wallez's secretary, Germaine Kieckens, who later became Hergé's first wife. For reasons unknown, the original book version omitted the page originally published in the 26 December 1929 edition of Le Petit Vingtième; since the story's republication in Archives Hergé, it has appeared in modern editions as page 97A.

In April 2012 an original copy of the first album was sold for a record price of €37,820 by specialised auctioneers Banque Dessinée of Elsene, with another copy being sold for €9,515. In October the same year a copy was sold at the same auction house for €17,690.

=== Later publications ===
By 1936, there was already a demand for reprints of Tintin in the Land of the Soviets, with Lesne sending a letter to Hergé enquiring if this was possible. The cartoonist was reluctant, stating that the original plates for the story were now in a poor condition and that as a result he would have to redraw the entire story were it to be re-published. Several years later, amid the German occupation of Belgium during World War II, a German-run publishing company asked Hergé for permission to republish Tintin in the Land of the Soviets, with the intent of using it as anti-Soviet propaganda, but again Hergé declined the offer.

From 1942 onwards, Hergé began redrawing and colouring his earlier Tintin adventures for Casterman, but chose not to do so for Tintin in the Land of the Soviets, considering its story too crude. Embarrassed by it, he labeled it a "transgression of [his] youth". Jean-Marc and Randy Lofficier believed that another factor in his decision might have been the story's virulently anti-Marxist theme, which would have been unpopular amidst growing West European sympathies for Marxism following the Second World War. In an article discussing Hergé's work which was published in the magazine Jeune Afrique ("Young Africa") in 1962, it was noted that despite the fact that fans of his work visited the Bibliothèque Nationale to read the copy of Land of the Soviets that was held there, it "will never (and with good cause) be republished". In 1961, Hergé wrote a letter to Casterman suggesting that the original version of the story be republished in a volume containing a publisher's warning about its content. Louis-Robert Casterman replied with a letter in which he stated that while the subject had been discussed within the company: "There are more hesitant or decidedly negative opinions than there are enthusiastic ones. Whatever the case, you can rest assured that the matter is being actively considered".

As The Adventures of Tintin became more popular in Western Europe, and some of the rarer books became collector's items, the original printed edition of Tintin in the Land of the Soviets became highly valued and unauthorized editions began to be produced. As a result, Studios Hergé published 500 numbered copies to mark the series' 40th birthday in 1969. This encouraged further demand, leading to the production of further "mediocre-quality" unlicensed editions, which were sold at "very high prices". To stem this illegal trade, Hergé agreed to a 1973 republication as part of the Archives Hergé collection, where it appeared in a collected volume alongside Tintin in the Congo and Tintin in America. With unofficial copies continuing to be sold, Casterman produced a facsimile edition of the original in 1981. Over the next decade, it was translated into nine languages, with an English-language edition translated by Leslie Lonsdale-Cooper and Michael Turner published by Sundancer in 1989. This edition was republished in 1999 for the 70th anniversary of Tintin in the Land of the Soviets.

Sociologist John Theobald noted that by the 1980s, the book's plot had become "socially and politically acceptable" in the western world as part of the Reaganite intensification of the Cold War and increased hostility towards Marxism and socialism. This cultural climate allowed it to appear "on hypermarket shelves as suitable children's literature for the new millennium". That same theme prevented its publication in Communist Party-governed China, where it was the only completed adventure not translated by Wang Bingdong and officially published in the early 21st century.

In 2017, two French colour versions were created by Casterman and Moulinsart.

== Critical reception ==
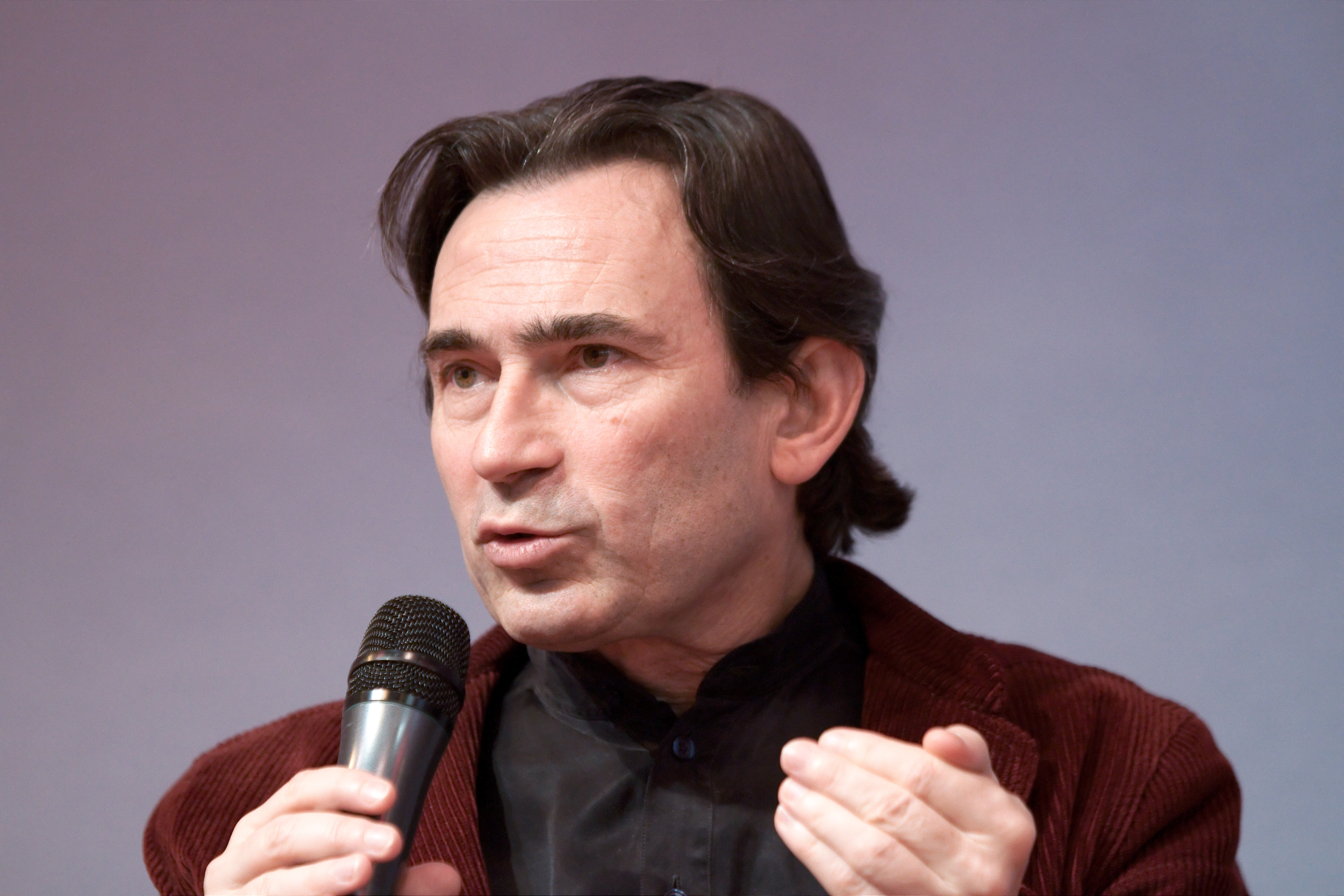
Hergé biographer Benoît Peeters considered In the Land of the Soviets to be "joyously bizarre" but also clearly Hergé's worst: "One couldn't have imagined a less remarkable debut".

In his study of the cultural and literary legacy of Brussels, André De Vries remarked that Tintin in the Land of the Soviets was "crude by Hergé's later standards, in every sense of the word". Simon Kuper of the Financial Times criticised both Land of the Soviets and Tintin in the Congo as the "worst" of the Adventures, being "poorly drawn" and "largely plot-free". Sociologist John Theobald of the Southampton Institute argued that Hergé had no interest in providing factual information about the Soviet Union, but only wanted to inculcate his readers against Marxism, hence depicting the Bolsheviks rigging elections, killing opponents and stealing the grain from the people. According to literary critic Jean-Marie Apostolidès of Stanford University, Hergé cast the Bolsheviks as "absolute evil" but was unable to understand how they had risen to power, or what their political views were. This meant that Tintin did not know this either, thereby observing the Soviet "world of misery" and fighting Bolsheviks without being able to foment an effective counter-revolution. Literary critic Tom McCarthy described the plot as "fairly straightforward" and criticised the depiction of Bolsheviks as "pantomime cut-outs".

Hergé biographer Benoît Peeters was critical of the opening pages to the story, believing that the illustrations in it were among Hergé's worst and stating: "One couldn't have imagined a less remarkable debut for a work destined for such greatness". He believed that Tintin was an existentialist "Sartre-esque character" who existed only through his actions, operating simply as a narrative vehicle throughout the book. Where Hergé showed his talent, Peeters thought, was in conveying movement, and in utilising language in a "constantly imaginative" way. He considered the story's "absurdity" to be its best feature, rejecting plausible scenarios in favour of the "joyously bizarre", such as Tintin being frozen solid and then thawing, or Snowy dressing in a tiger skin to scare away a real tiger. Hergé biographer Pierre Assouline described the comic writer's image of the Soviet Union as being "a Dantesque vision of poverty, famine, terror, and repression".

Marking the release of Steven Spielberg's The Adventures of Tintin: The Secret of the Unicorn film in 2011, the British Broadcasting Corporation (BBC) commissioned a documentary devoted to Tintin in the Land of the Soviets in which journalist Frank Gardner—who considered Tintin to be his boyhood hero—visited Russia, investigating and defending the accuracy of Hergé's account of Soviet human rights abuses. First airing on Sunday 30 October on BBC Two, the documentary was produced by Graham Strong, with Luned Tonderai as producer and Tim Green as executive producer. David Butcher reviewed the documentary for the Radio Times, opining that Gardner's trip was dull compared to the comic's adventure, but praising a few "great moments", such as the scene in which Gardner tested an open-topped 1929 Amilcar, just as Tintin did in the adventure.

== Public domain status ==
Under US law, the term for the Tintin comics is 95 years from their date of first publication abroad in 1929. (Note: See Title 17, Chapter 1, Section 104 and 104A of the United States Code) (Note: See Title 17, Chapter 3, Section 304 of the United States Code) (Note: See Circular 38B from the United States Copyright Office) As of January 1, 2025, Tintin and other characters appearing in the original 1929 comic strips entered the public domain in the United States. Subsequent Tintin works will enter the public domain yearly on January 1 if United States copyright laws are not amended. However, Tintin remains under copyright in his original country, Belgium, and other countries utilizing terms that expire after a set period of time following the author's death. (Note: The original author, Hergé, died in 1983. For countries that follow Life+ rules this means that that Tintin is not yet public domain. The most common dates for Hergé-created Tintin works to enter the public domain are 2034 and 2054 for life+50 and life+70 rules, respectively.)
