= Le Petit Vingtième =

Weekly newspaper supplement where the comic strip "Tintin" first appeared

Le Petit Vingtième, number 32 from 1934

Le Petit Vingtième (French: [lə pti vɛ̃tjɛm], The Little Twentieth) was the weekly youth supplement to the Belgian newspaper Le Vingtième Siècle ("The Twentieth Century") from 1928 to 1940. The comics series The Adventures of Tintin first appeared in its pages.

== History ==
Le Vingtième Siècle was a Catholic and conservative newspaper published in Brussels, led by abbot Norbert Wallez. In 1925, 18-year-old Hergé (Georges Prosper Remi), the creator of Tintin, worked there, first as a clerk and, after he fulfilled his military service, as an illustrator for the main pages and for some supplements like the weekly arts pages and the women's section.

In 1928, the abbot decided to start a weekly 8-page youth supplement, appearing every Thursday. He called it Le Petit Vingtième (The Little Twentieth). Hergé was named editor-in-chief. In the first issue, appearing on 1 November 1928, he illustrated a short comic made by Desmedt, the sports editor of the newspaper called Les Aventures de Flup, Nénesse, Poussette et Cochonnet. Sensing that this comic lacked spirit and was rather old-fashioned compared to the current American comics and to the works of Alain Saint-Ogan, Hergé started working on his own comic. In 1927 he met Germaine Kieckens, the secretary of the abbot at the newspaper. They were engaged in 1932 and married on 20 July the same year.

On 10 January 1929, in issue 11, Tintin in the Land of the Soviets began. Every issue featured two pages of the story, and Hergé often made covers for the supplement depicting Tintin as well. A year later, on 23 January 1930, the supplement increased from eight to 16 pages, and the first page of Quick & Flupke, a new gag strip, appeared in the magazine. 310 gags would appear before the paper folded.

The supplement, especially the comics, was an overwhelming success, with circulation of the publication quadrupling on Thursdays. At the end of each of the first three stories of The Adventures of Tintin, an actual reception of the comic hero (played by an actor) at the station in Brussels was organized, with thousands of people attending. The first of these was attended by Zita of Bourbon-Parma, the former empress of Austria, and her children.

In the meantime the first assistants to Hergé were hired to help him fill the supplement and to do minor work on Tintin and Quick & Flupke: Eugène Van Nijverseel, better known as Evany, and Paul Jamin (also signing as Jam).

To capitalize on the success, a new publishing house was started, Les éditions du Petit Vingtième. It published the first three books of Tintin and the first two of Quick & Flupke before folding and passing the rights in 1934 to Casterman, which was better suited to cope with the international success of Tintin (which by then also appeared in France and Switzerland). Both the newspaper comics and the album publications were in black and white, although the covers to the supplement, which were also often made by Hergé, used a supporting colour.

Between 8 February and 16 August 1934, Hergé also published the more juvenile story Les aventures de Popol et Virginie chez les Lapinos (translated as Popol out west). This story was only first published as an album (in French) in 1952 though.

In February 1940, an attempt was made to launch De Bengel, a Dutch translation of Le Petit Vingtième. This magazine marked the first appearance of Tintin in Dutch. The magazine seems to have never been distributed though, and only one copy is known to exist. In the 2011 film, The Adventures of Tintin, Le Petit Vingtième makes an appearance with its French title, but with a front page in English and the Dutch words redactie en beheer ("editorial board and management") visible in the banner.

The publication of Tintin and Quick & Flupke continued in the newspaper supplement until the German occupation of Belgium in May 1940.

== Tintin publications ==
- Tintin in the Land of the Soviets: 10 January 1929 – 8 May 1930: album 1930 (10 editions of 1,000 copies each, sold out by December 1930) (139 pages)
- Tintin in the Congo: 5 June 1930 – 11 June 1931: arrival at Brussels North train station on 9 July 1931: album 1931 (110 pages)
- Tintin in America: 3 September 1931 – 20 October 1932: album 1932 (120 pages)
- Cigars of the Pharaoh (published as "Tintin in the Orient"): 8 December 1932 – 2 August 1934 (124 pages)
- The Blue Lotus: 9 August 1934 – 17 October 1935 (124 pages)
- The Broken Ear: 5 December 1935 – 25 February 1937
- The Black Island: 15 April 1937 – 16 June 1938 (124 pages)
- King Ottokar's Sceptre (published as "Tintin in Syldavia"): 4 August 1938 – 10 August 1939 (106 pages)
- Land of Black Gold: 28 September 1939 – 8 May 1940 (unfinished)

== Quick & Flupke publications ==
Between 1930 and 1940, some 310 gags of Quick & Flupke appeared in 'Le Petit Vingtième, all in black and white. They regularly appeared on the cover of the supplement as well. Two albums were published by the Editions du Petit Vingtième. Most of the other gags appeared later at Casterman.

- Quick et Flupke gamins de Bruxelles (1931)
- Les nouveaux exploits de Quick et Flupke gamins de Bruxelles: 2ème série (1932)

== Notes ==
=== Bibliography ===
- Goddin, Philippe (2008). Hergé. Levenslijnen. Biografie (in Dutch). Moulinsart. ISBN 978-2-87424-171-0.
- de Grand Ry, Michel; Nizette, André; Lechat, Jean-Louis (1986). "Hergé". Le livre d'or de la bande dessinée. Brussels: Centre de la bande dessinée Belge.
