= Le Vingtième Siècle =

Defunct Belgian newspaper known for first publishing the Adventures of Tintin

- Owner: Georges Helleputte
- Founder: Joseph d'Ursel
- Editor: Norbert Wallez
- Founded: 1895
- Political alignment: Conservative, Catholic Party (Belgium)
- Language: French
- Ceased publication: 1940

Le Vingtième Siècle (French: [lə vɛ̃tjɛm sjɛkl], The Twentieth Century) was a Belgian newspaper that was published from 1898 to 1940. Its supplement Le Petit Vingtième ("The Little Twentieth") is known as the first publication to feature The Adventures of Tintin.

The conservative Catholic newspaper was founded by Georges Helleputte, Joseph d'Ursel, and Athanase de Broqueville (brother of Belgian Prime Minister Charles de Broqueville). Its first issue was published on 6 June 1898. It sold poorly and was kept alive by Charles de Broqueville and other Belgian aristocrats.

In 1914, Fernand Neuray took over as editor-in-chief. He distanced the newspaper from the Catholic alignment and tried to position it as a national newspaper.

== Notes and references ==
3. The history of Le Vingtieme Siecle.

- Pierre Assouline, Hergé, Plon, 1996.
