= List of Tintin media =

This is a list of books, films, and media associated with The Adventures of Tintin, the comics series by Belgian cartoonist Hergé.

== Books ==
The books can either be listed in the order in which the stories first appeared in newspapers or magazines (the "production order"), or in the order they were first published in album form ("publication order"). As many early stories were altered in the redrawings, and therefore chronologically fit in more with the later albums, both orders can be considered valid. Sometimes the redrawings introduced problems with the chronological order, one example is when Sheik Patrash Pasha presents a copy of Destination Moon in Cigars of the Pharaoh—Destination Moon was published almost 20 years after Cigars of the Pharaoh.

=== Production order ===
1. Tintin in the Land of the Soviets (Tintin au pays des Soviets) (1929–1930)
2. Tintin in the Congo (Tintin au Congo) (1930–1931)
3. Tintin in America (Tintin en Amérique) (1931–1932)
4. Cigars of the Pharaoh (Les Cigares du Pharaon) (1932–1934)
5. The Blue Lotus (Le Lotus bleu) (1934–1935)
6. The Broken Ear (L'Oreille cassée) (1935–1937)
7. The Black Island (L'Île noire) (1937–1938)
8. King Ottokar's Sceptre (Le Sceptre d'Ottokar) (1938–1939)
9. The Crab with the Golden Claws (Le Crabe aux pinces d'or) (1940–1941)
10. The Shooting Star (L'Étoile mystérieuse) (1941–1942)
11. The Secret of the Unicorn (Le Secret de La Licorne) (1942–1943)
12. Red Rackham's Treasure (Le Trésor de Rackham le Rouge) (1943)
13. The Seven Crystal Balls (Les 7 Boules de cristal) (1943–1946)
14. Prisoners of the Sun (Le Temple du Soleil) (1946–1948)
15. Land of Black Gold (Tintin au pays de l'or noir) (1948–1950) ^{1}
16. Destination Moon (Objectif Lune) (1950–1953)
17. Explorers on the Moon (On a marché sur la Lune) (1950–1953)
18. The Calculus Affair (L'Affaire Tournesol) (1954–1956)
19. The Red Sea Sharks (Coke en stock) (1956–1958)
20. Tintin in Tibet (Tintin au Tibet) (1958–1959)
21. The Castafiore Emerald (Les Bijoux de la Castafiore) (1961–1962)
22. Flight 714 to Sydney (Vol 714 pour Sydney) (1966–1967)
23. Tintin and the Picaros (Tintin et les Picaros) (1975–1976)
24. Tintin and Alph-Art (Tintin et l'Alph-Art): Unfinished work, published posthumously in 1986, and republished with more material in 2004.

1: Actually begun in 1939 but left uncompleted in 1940, redrawn starting 1948.

=== Publication order ===
Title	French language editions					English language editions	
Title	Serialised versions			Album collections			
Title	Le Petit Vingtième	Le Soir	Tintin magazine	B&W	Colour	Colour	B&W
Tintin in the Land of the Soviets	1929–30			1930	2017		1989
Tintin in the Congo	1930–31			1931	1946 (redrawn) (Note: Further changes were made for Scandinavian readers in 1975, to remove a scene of Tintin killing a rhinoceros. This was retained in subsequent reprints and translations.)	2005	1991
Tintin in America	1931–32			1932	1945 (redrawn)	1962	2004
Cigars of the Pharaoh	1932–34			1934	1955 (redrawn)	1971	2006
The Blue Lotus	1934–35			1936	1946 (partially redrawn)	1983	2006
The Broken Ear	1935–37			1937	1943	1975	
The Black Island	1937–38		1965	1938	1943; 1965 (redrawn)	1966	
King Ottokar's Sceptre	1938–39			1939	1947 (partially redrawn)	1958	
The Crab with the Golden Claws		1940–41		1941	1943 (redrawn)	1972	
The Shooting Star		1941–42			1942	1961	
The Secret of the Unicorn		1942–43			1943	1974	
Red Rackham's Treasure		1943			1944	1974	
The Seven Crystal Balls		1943–44	1946–48		1948	1962	
Prisoners of the Sun			1946–48		1949	1990	
Land of Black Gold	1939–40		1948–50 (redrawn)		1950; 1971 (redrawn)	1972	
Destination Moon			1950–52		1953	1959	
Explorers on the Moon			1952–53		1954	1989	
The Calculus Affair			1955–56		1956	1960	
The Red Sea Sharks			1956–58		1958	1990	
Tintin in Tibet			1958–59		1960	1962	
The Castafiore Emerald			1961–62		1963	1963	
Flight 714			1966–67		1968	1968	
Tintin and the Picaros			1975–76		1976	1977	
Tintin and Alph-Art				1986			1990 (Note: Expanded version released by Egmont in 2004.)

== Radio ==
The BBC produced two series of Tintin radio dramatisations by Simon Eastwood. They were first broadcast on BBC Radio 5 in 1992 and 1993. The cast featured Richard Pearce as Tintin, Andrew Sachs as Snowy, Leo McKern as Captain Haddock (Lionel Jeffries in series 2), Stephen Moore as Professor Calculus and Charles Kay as Thomson and Thompson. The music, which concludes quoting the final piano flourish from The Adventures of Tintin (TV series) theme, was composed by Roger Limb. Both series were released on BBC Audio Cassette (ISBN 0-8072-8103-4).

=== Series 1 ===
1. The Black Island
2. The Secret of the Unicorn
3. Red Rackham's Treasure
4. Destination Moon
5. Explorers on the Moon
6. Tintin in Tibet

=== Series 2 ===
1. The Seven Crystal Balls
2. Prisoners of the Sun
3. The Calculus Affair (Part One)
4. The Calculus Affair (Part Two)
5. The Red Sea Sharks (Part One)
6. The Red Sea Sharks (Part Two)

=== Special ===
1. The Castafiore Emerald (50-minute Christmas Special). It guest-starred Miriam Margolyes as Bianca Castafiore. It has not yet received a commercial release nor a repeat broadcast.

== Television ==
There have been two animated television series, based on the comic books.

- Hergé's Adventures of Tintin (1958–1962), was produced by Belvision (Belgium).
- The Adventures of Tintin (1991–1992), was produced by Ellipse (France), and Nelvana (Canada).

== Cinema ==
There have been a number of feature films featuring the characters, but not always based on original works by Hergé. There have been two live action films with actors cast for their resemblance to the characters.

In 1948, Hergé wrote to Walt Disney hoping to pitch his series into a potential animated feature in an effort to introduce Tintin to American audiences. The proposal fell through as Disney was busy working on Cinderella around that time, though Hergé did receive a Mickey Mouse trophy and a picture showing Tintin and Mickey shaking hands decades later.

Live action films:

- Tintin and the Mystery of the Golden Fleece (Tintin et le mystère de la Toison d'or) (1961, live action, original story)
- Tintin and the Blue Oranges (Tintin et les oranges bleues) (1964, live action, original story)

Animated films:

- The Crab with the Golden Claws (Le Crabe aux pinces d'or) (1947, stop motion animation, adaptation)
- The Adventures of Tintin: The Calculus Case (Les Aventures de Tintin: L'Affaire Tournesol) (1964, animation, adaptation)
- Tintin and the Temple of the Sun (Tintin et le temple du Soleil) (1969, animation, adaptation)
- Tintin and the Lake of Sharks (Tintin et le lac aux requins) (1972, animation, original story)
- The Adventures of Tintin (2011) a motion capture film directed by Steven Spielberg and co-produced by Peter Jackson.
- The Adventures of Tintin 2 (in development) a planned motion capture film directed by Peter Jackson and co-produced by Steven Spielberg.

== Documentaries ==
- I, Tintin (Moi, Tintin) (1976, produced by Belevision Studios and Pierre films)
- Tintin and I (Tintin et Moi) (2003, documentary about Hergé's struggle while creating Tintin in Tibet)
- Sur le traces de Tintin (2010, documentary series)
- Discovering Hergé (2012, produced by 3DD Productions)

== Theatre ==
- Tintin in India: The Mystery of the Blue Diamond (1941) — Hergé himself collaborated with humourist Jacques Van Melkebeke to write this play, which covers much of the second half of Cigars of the Pharaoh, as Tintin attempts to rescue a stolen blue diamond. Performed at the Théâtre Royal des Galeries in Brussels.
- Mr. Boullock's Disappearance (1941–1942) — also co-written by Hergé and Van Melkebeke, the play has Tintin, Snowy, and Thomson and Thompson track the mysterious Mr. Boullock around the world and back to Brussels again. Performed at the Théâtre Royal des Galeries in Brussels.
- Tintin's Great American Adventure (1976–1977) — based on Tintin in America; adapted by Geoffrey Case and directed by Tony Wredden; at the Arts Theatre, London, by the Unicorn Theatre Company.
- Tintin and the Black Island (1980–81) — based on The Black Island; adapted by Geoffrey Case and directed by Tony Wredden; at the Arts Theatre, London, by the Unicorn Theatre Company; later toured.
- Tintin and the Temple of the Sun (premiered 15 September 2001) — musical based on The Seven Crystal Balls and Prisoners of the Sun' premièred at the Stadsschouwburg (City Theatre) in Antwerp, Belgium, and was broadcast on Canal Plus, before moving on to Charleroi in 2002 as Tintin – Le Temple du Soleil – Le Spectacle Musical.
- Hergé's Adventures of Tintin (also known as Tintin the Show) (2005–2006) — musical version of Tintin in Tibet, at the Barbican Arts Centre, produced by the Young Vic theatre company in London. The production was directed by Rufus Norris and adapted by Norris and David Greig. The show was successfully revived at the Playhouse Theatre in the West End of London before touring (2006–2007) to celebrate the centenary of Hergé's birth in 2007.

== Video games ==
1. Tintin on the Moon (1989)
2. Tintin in Tibet (1996)
3. Prisoners of the Sun (1997)
4. Destination Adventure (2001)
5. The Adventures of Tintin: The Secret of the Unicorn (2011)
6. Tintin Match (2020)
7. Tintin Reporter – Cigars of the Pharaoh (2023)

== Reprints and republications ==
- In 1951 British weekly comic The Eagle ran "King Ottokar's Sceptre"
- In the 1960s and 1970s, various Tintin comics were reprinted in the American children's magazine Children's Digest.
- In 2000–2001, the short-lived magazine "Explore!" ran "The Black Island" and "King Ottokar's Sceptre"
- In 1982-90, the Indian fortnightly magazine "Anandamela" also ran 'The Adventures of Tintin' as 'Dyushahasi Tintin (দুঃসাহসী টিনটিন)'. They ran the 'Tintin in the Land of the Soviets' to 'Tintin and the Picaros'.

== See also ==
- List of books about Tintin
- List of films based on French-language comics
- Tintin coins
- Tintin postage stamps
- The Adventures of Tintin
- Tintin (magazine)
- Studios Hergé
- The Adventures of Tintin (TV series)

== Sources ==
Books

- Lofficier, Jean-Marc; Lofficier, Randy (2002). The Pocket Essential Tintin. Harpenden, Hertfordshire: Pocket Essentials. ISBN 978-1-84243-226-6.
- Sadoul, Numa (1975). Tintin et moi: entretiens avec Hergé [Tintin and I: Interviews with Hergé] (in French). Casterman. ISBN 978-2-08-080052-7.
- Thompson, Harry (1991). Tintin: Hergé and His Creation. London: John Murray Publishers Ltd. ISBN 978-1-84854-672-1.

News articles

- Billington, Michael (15 December 2005). "Hergé's Adventures of Tintin". The Guardian. London. Archived from the original on 24 December 2013.
- Bostock, Sarah; Brennan, Jon (10 January 2007). "Talk of the toon". The Guardian. London. Archived from the original on 20 December 2013.
- Junkers, Dorothee (22 May 2007). "Centennial of Tintin's Hergé noted". Taipei Times. Taipei. Archived from the original on 20 December 2013.
- Pollard, Lawrence (22 May 2007). "Belgium honours Tintin's creator". BBC News. London. Archived from the original on 3 October 2007.
- Smurthwaite, Nick (13 December 2007). "Hergé's Adventure of Tintin". The Stage. London. Archived from the original on 24 December 2013.
- "Tintin creator's centenary". The Age. Melbourne. 24 May 2006. Archived from the original on 15 March 2014.
- "Kuifje maakt opmerkelijke entree op West End" [Tintin Makes a Remarkable Entrance on West End]. Het Laatste Nieuws (in Dutch). Brussels. 13 December 2007. Archived from the original on 24 December 2013.
- "Tintin fait une entrée remarquée sur le Broadway londonien" [Tintin Makes a Grand Entrance on the London Broadway]. Le Devoir (in French). Montréal. 14 December 2007. Archived from the original on 7 January 2009.

Web sites

- Cadambi, Abra (2006). "Hergé & Tintin—A Guide: Tintin Live!". Hergé & Tintin – A Guide to all things Hergé [a personal website]. Archived from the original on 24 December 2013.
- Wainman, Richard (15 January 2006). "Tintin Audio Releases". Tintinologist.org. Archived from the original on 24 December 2013. "Tintin: Le Temple du Soleil. Tabas&Co 5005, 2002. (Charleroi cast)"
- "Rufus Norris to direct World Premiere of Tintin". YoungVic.org. November 2005. Archived from the original on 9 November 2006.
- "Hergé's Adventures of Tintin [Musical]". SoniaFriedman.com. November 2007. Archived from the original on 25 December 2013.
