= Tintin in Tibet =

Comic album by Belgian cartoonist Hergé

Tintin in Tibet (Tintin au Tibet)
- Cover of the English edition
- Date: 1960
- Series: The Adventures of Tintin
- Publisher: Casterman

Creative team
- Creator: Hergé

Original publication
- Published in: Tintin magazine
- Issues: 523 – 585
- Date of publication: 17 September 1958 – 25 November 1959
- Language: French

Translation
- Publisher: Methuen
- Date: 1962
- Translator: Leslie Lonsdale-Cooper; Michael Turner

Chronology
- Preceded by: The Red Sea Sharks (1958)
- Followed by: The Castafiore Emerald (1963)

Tintin in Tibet (French: Tintin au Tibet) is the twentieth volume of The Adventures of Tintin, the comics series by Belgian cartoonist Hergé. It was serialised weekly from September 1958 to November 1959 in Tintin magazine and published as a book in 1960. Hergé considered it his favourite Tintin adventure and an emotional effort, as he created it while suffering from traumatic nightmares and a personal conflict while deciding to leave his wife of three decades for a younger woman. The story tells of the young reporter Tintin in search of his friend Chang Chong-Chen, who the authorities claim has died in a plane crash in the Himalayas. Convinced that Chang has survived and accompanied only by Snowy, Captain Haddock and the Sherpa guide Tharkey, Tintin crosses the Himalayas to the plateau of Tibet, along the way encountering the mysterious Yeti.

Following The Red Sea Sharks (1958) and its large number of characters, Tintin in Tibet differs from other stories in the series in that it features only a few familiar characters and is also Hergé's only adventure not to pit Tintin against an antagonist. Themes in Hergé's story include extrasensory perception, the mysticism of Tibetan Buddhism, and friendship. Translated into 32 languages, Tintin in Tibet was widely acclaimed by critics and is generally considered to be Hergé's finest work; it has also been praised by the Dalai Lama, who awarded it the Light of Truth Award. The story was a commercial success and was published in book form by Casterman shortly after its conclusion; the series itself became a defining part of the Franco-Belgian comics tradition. Tintin in Tibet was adapted for the 1991 Ellipse/Nelvana animated series The Adventures of Tintin, the 1992–93 BBC Radio 5 dramatisation of the Adventures, the 1996 video game of the same name, and the 2005–06 Young Vic musical Hergé's Adventures of Tintin; it was also prominently featured in the 2003 documentary Tintin and I and has been the subject of a museum exhibition.

== Synopsis ==
While on holiday at a resort in the French Alps with Snowy and Captain Haddock, Tintin reads about a plane crash in the Gosain Than Massif in the Himalayas of Tibet. He then has a vision of his friend Chang Chong-Chen, badly injured and calling for help from the wreckage of the crashed plane. Convinced of Chang's survival, Tintin flies to Kathmandu, via Delhi, with Snowy and a skeptical Captain Haddock. They hire a Sherpa named Tharkey and, accompanied by porters, travel overland from Nepal towards the crash site.

The porters abandon the group in fear when mysterious tracks are found, while Tintin, Haddock and Tharkey go on and eventually reach the crash site. Tintin sets off with Snowy to trace Chang's steps, and finds a cave where Chang has carved his name on a rock. On leaving the cave, he encounters a snowstorm and glimpses what seems to be a human silhouette. Tharkey believes that Tintin saw the Yeti and convinces him to abandon his friend and return with him to Nepal, since the area is too large to search. Tintin spots a scarf on a cliff face, concludes Chang is nearby, and continues with only the Captain. While attempting to scale a cliff face, Haddock slips and hangs out of reach, imperilling Tintin, who is tied to him. He tells Tintin to cut the rope to save himself, but Tintin refuses. Haddock tries to cut it himself, but drops his knife, alerting Tharkey, who has returned in time to rescue them. They try to camp for the night but lose their tent and must trek onwards, unable to sleep lest they freeze, arriving within sight of the Buddhist monastery of Khor-Biyong before being caught in an avalanche.

Blessed Lightning, a monk at the monastery, has a vision of Tintin, Snowy, Haddock, and Tharkey in danger. Tintin regains consciousness and, too weak to walk, gives Snowy a note to deliver. Snowy runs to the monastery, loses the message, but is recognised as the dog from Blessed Lightning's vision. Tintin, Haddock and Tharkey regain consciousness in the monastery and are brought before the Grand Abbot. The Abbot tells Tintin to abandon his quest, but Blessed Lightning has another vision, through which Tintin learns that Chang is still alive inside a mountain cave at the Horn of the Yak—and that the Yeti is also there. Tintin and Haddock travel on to the Horn of the Yak.

They arrive at a cave. Tintin ventures inside and finds Chang, who is feverish and shaking. The Yeti suddenly appears, revealed as a large anthropoid, reacting with anger at Tintin's attempt to take Chang. As it lunges at Tintin, it grabs Tintin's camera and triggers the flash bulb, which scares the Yeti away. Chang tells Tintin that the Yeti saved his life after the crash. Upon returning to inhabited lands, the friends are surprised to be met by the Grand Abbot, who presents Tintin with a khata scarf in honour of the bravery he has shown for his friend Chang. As the party travels home, Chang muses that the Yeti is not a wild animal, but has a human soul. The Yeti sadly watches their departure from a distance.

== History ==
=== Background and early ideas ===
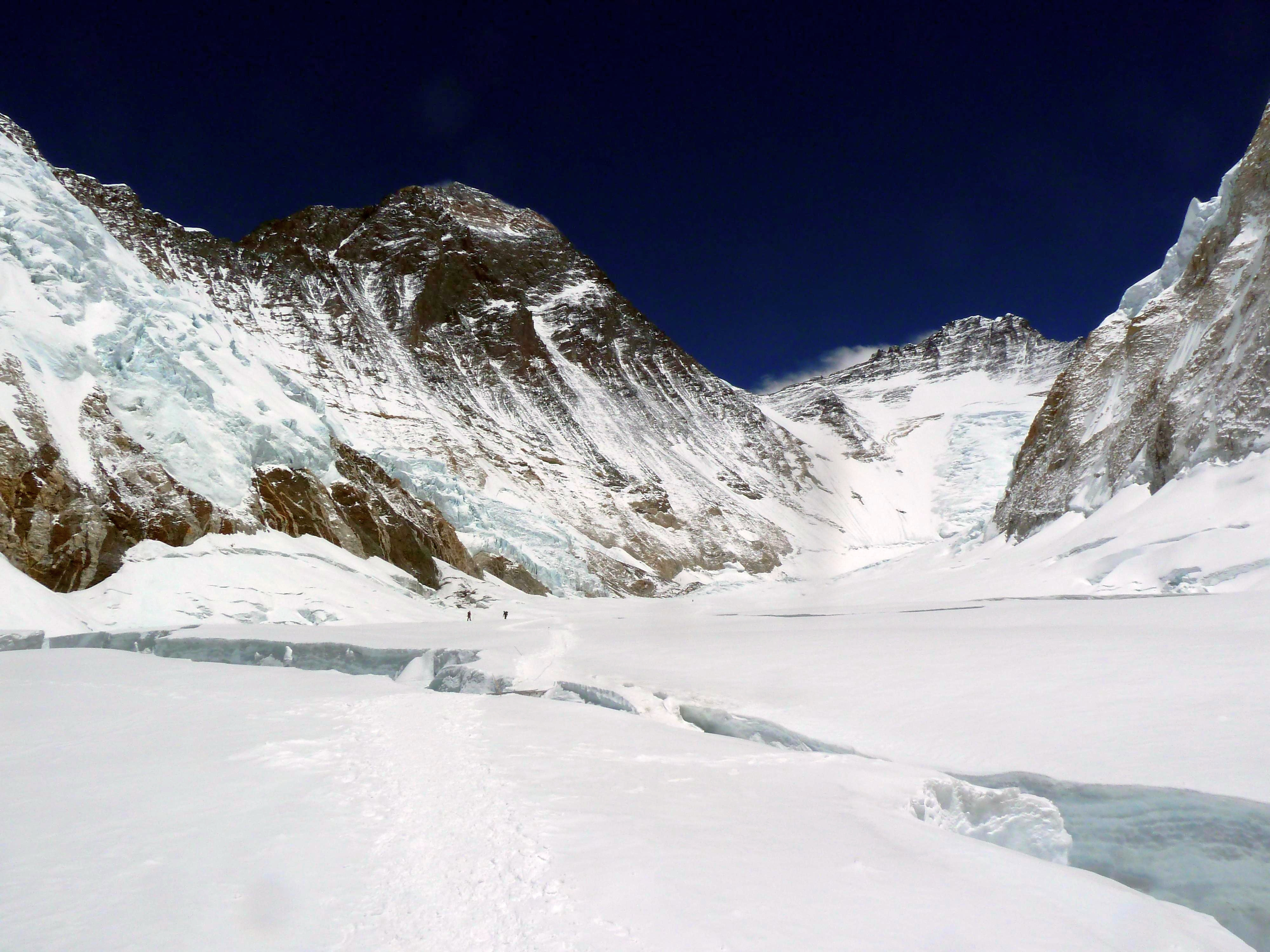
Hergé amassed a collection of clippings and used pictures similar to this image of the Tibetan landscape as inspiration for his mountainscape drawings.

In October 1957, Hergé sent his publisher, Casterman, the cover of his completed nineteenth Tintin adventure, The Red Sea Sharks, and for several weeks considered plot ideas for his next story. Fondly recalling the Scouting days of his youth, his first idea was to send Tintin back to the United States, as in the third adventure, Tintin in America, to help a group of Native Americans defend their land from a large corporation that wished to drill for oil; on reflection, Hergé came to believe that retracing old ground would be a step backwards. Another idea had Tintin striving to prove that Haddock's butler Nestor was framed for a crime committed by his old employers, the Bird brothers. He dismissed this as well, but kept the idea of an adventure with no guns or violence—the only Tintin story without an antagonist. (Note: Regarding Tintin in Tibet being the only Tintin story without an antagonist, Farr noted, "Even The Castafiore Emerald has a culpable magpie".) A third idea sent Tintin and Professor Calculus to a snow-covered polar region, where a stranded group of explorers need Calculus to save them from food poisoning. He abandoned this plot also, but kept the setting in a snowy environment and decided to focus, not on Calculus, but on his main character Tintin. (Note: Other discarded story ideas included a duck with an SOS attached landing on a steamer, a forgotten people on a Pacific island held in a concentration camp, and the abandoned spy thriller Le Thermozéro.)

A collaborator of Hergé's, Jacques Van Melkebeke, had suggested in 1954 to set a story in Tibet, likely influenced by the play he adapted for Hergé in the 1940s, M. Boullock a disparu (Mr. Boullock's Disappearance). Bernard Heuvelmans, a cryptozoologist who had helped Hergé envision lunar exploration for the two-part Destination Moon and Explorers on the Moon, had given him a copy of his book Sur la piste des bêtes ignorées (On the Trail of Unknown Animals) in 1955, inscribing on the inside the suggestion that one day Tintin should meet the Yeti. By 1958, Hergé decided that Tibet would be the setting of Tintin's next Adventure. Initial ideas for the title were Le museau de la vache (The Cow's Snout), Le museau de l'ours (The Bear's Snout), and Le museau du yak (The Yak's Snout), all of which refer to the mountain in the latter part of the story. Although it was initially claimed that "market research" chose the title Tintin in Tibet suggesting sales would be better if the book used Tintin's name in the title, entertainment producer and author Harry Thompson suggested "the title reflected the solo nature of [Tintin's] undertaking".

=== Hergé's psychological problems ===
Hergé reached a particularly traumatic period in his life and suffered a mental breakdown. In 1956, he realised that he had fallen out of love with his wife Germaine, whom he had married in 1932, and by 1958, he and Fanny Vlaminck, a colourist at Studios Hergé twenty-eight years his junior, had developed a deep mutual attraction. They began courting; Hergé's new companion lifted his morale and shared many of his interests. Germaine soon began interfering with the affair, causing Hergé to admit his desire had been to maintain a relationship with both women. When he failed to please either, he began to contemplate divorcing Germaine to marry Fanny. His Catholic upbringing and Boy Scout ethic, however, caused him to feel tremendous guilt. As he later related to interviewer Numa Sadoul:

"It meant turning upside down all my values—what a shock! This was a serious moral crisis: I was married, and I loved someone else; life seemed impossible with my wife, but on the other hand I had this scout-like idea of giving my word for ever. It was a real catastrophe. I was completely torn up".

During this period, Hergé had recurrent nightmares where he faced images of what he described as "the beauty and cruelty of white"—visions of white and snow that he could not explain. As he later told Sadoul:

"At the time, I was going through a time of real crisis and my dreams were nearly always white dreams. And they were extremely distressing. I took note of them and remember one where I was in a kind of tower made up of a series of ramps. Dead leaves were falling and covering everything. At a particular moment, in an immaculately white alcove, a white skeleton appeared that tried to catch me. And then instantly everything around me became white".

At the advice of his former editor Raymond de Becker, Hergé travelled to Zürich to consult the Swiss psychoanalyst Franz Riklin, a student of Carl Jung, to decipher his disturbing dreams. Riklin latched on to the "quest for purity" that featured so prominently in Hergé's dreams, and ultimately in Tintin in Tibet. He told the author that he must destroy "the demon of purity" in his mind as soon as possible: "I do not want to discourage you, but you will never reach the goal of your work. It comes to one or the other: you must overcome your crisis, or continue your work. But, in your place, I would stop immediately!"

Although Hergé was tempted to abandon Tintin at Riklin's suggestion, devoting himself instead to his hobby of abstract art, he felt that doing so would be an acceptance of failure. In the end, he left his wife so that he could marry Fanny Vlaminck, and continued work on Tintin in Tibet, trusting that completing the book would exorcise the demons he felt possessed him. "It was a brave decision, and a good one", said British Tintin expert Michael Farr. "Few problems, psychological included, are solved by abandoning them". Thompson noted: "It was ironic, but not perhaps unpredictable, that faced with the moral dilemma posed by Riklin, Hergé chose to keep his Scout's word of honour to Tintin, but not to Germaine". (Note: Though separated from her, Hergé visited Germaine every Monday. Their divorce became final seventeen years later, in 1977.) Belgian Tintin expert Philippe Goddin summarised: "[Hergé] sought to regain a lost equilibrium, that he imposes on his hero a desire to seek purity ... considering it necessary for Tintin to go through the intimate experience of distress and loneliness ... and discover himself".

=== Influences ===
In creating Tintin in Tibet, Hergé drew upon a range of influences. Setting it in the Himalayas, a snow-covered environment, followed his recurring dreams of whiteness and his need to create an adventure that "must be a solo voyage of redemption" from the "whiteness of guilt". The idea of a solo voyage led to Tintin being accompanied only by Snowy, their guide, and a reluctant Haddock—who supplies the needed counterpoint and humour.

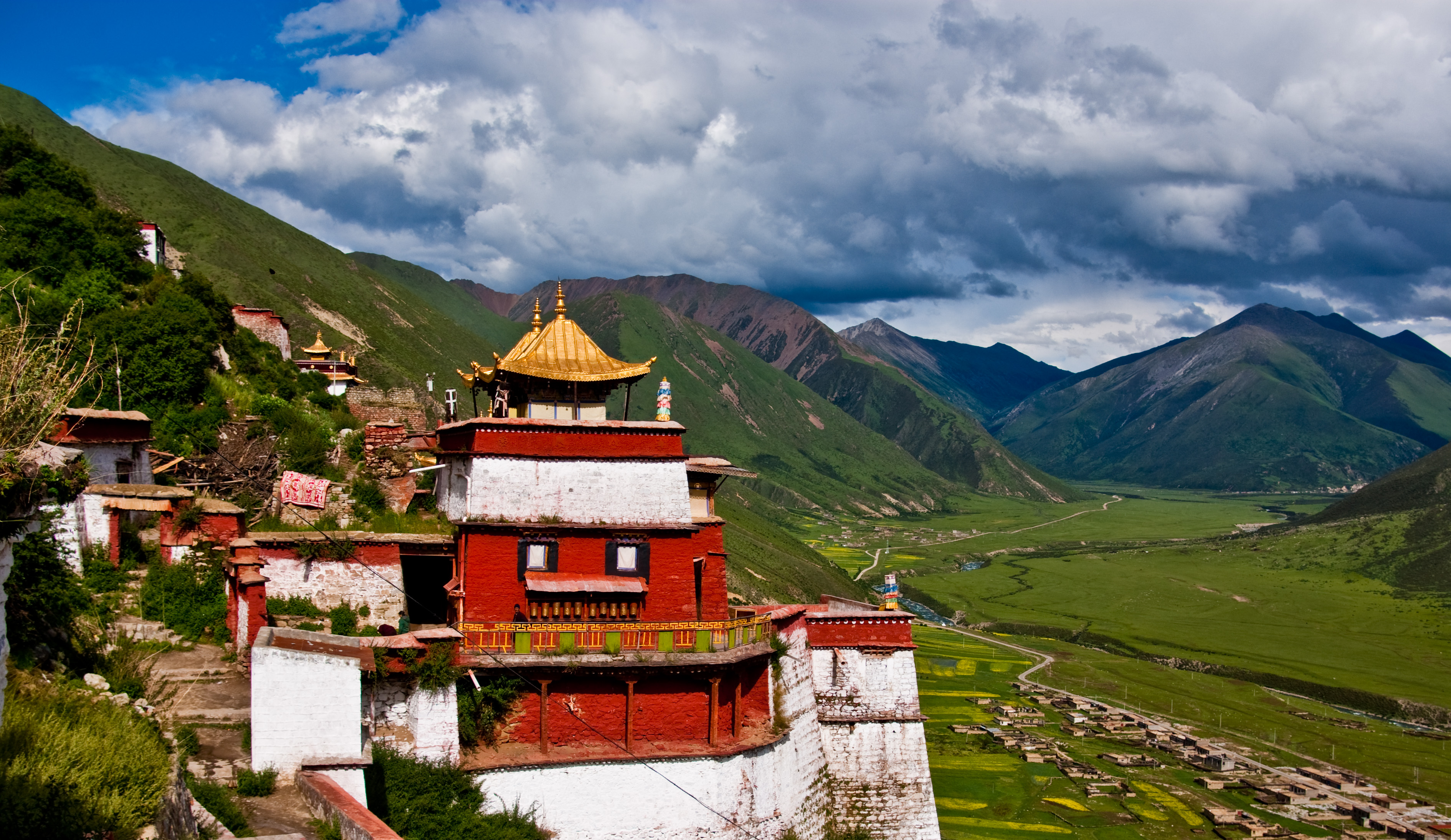
Drigung Monastery in the Himalayas of Tibet, similar to the Buddhist monastery depicted in the book

While considering the character of Chang, absent since The Blue Lotus, Hergé thought of his artistic Chinese friend Zhang Chongren, whom he had not seen since the days of their friendship over twenty years earlier. Hergé and Zhang used to spend every Sunday together, during which Hergé learned much about Chinese culture for his work on The Blue Lotus. (Note: For example, Zhang taught Hergé Chinese calligraphy, which explains Hergé's distinctive lettering proficiency best seen in the titles of any Tintin cover.) Later, Zhang moved back to his homeland and Hergé lost contact with his friend after the Japanese invasion of China in 1937. Hergé felt Chang and Tintin must be reunited, just as he hoped to see his friend again some day. (Note: Two years before Hergé's death in 1983, Zhang was located and reunited with Hergé in Brussels.)

Hergé read a variety of books about Tibet for this project: Fosco Maraini's Secret Tibet, Heinrich Harrer's Seven Years in Tibet, Tsewang Pemba's Tibet my Homeland, Maurice Herzog's Annapurna, discredited author Lobsang Rampa's The Third Eye, (Note: The author of The Third Eye, which purported to be the autobiography of a monk born in Tibet, was unmasked as a British plumber who decided in 1958 to write the bestseller.) and the books of Belgian explorer and spiritualist Alexandra David-Néel. Hergé visited the Belgian Alpine Society to examine their photographic collection of the Himalayas, and they sent him photographer Richard Lannoy's work on India. Models for drawings such as of monks with musical instruments, Sherpas with backpacks, and the aircraft wreckage came from clippings Hergé had collected from sources such as National Geographic. Members of the Studios helped him gather other source material; for instance, collaborator Jacques Martin researched and drew the story's costumes.

To learn about the Yeti, which he depicted as a benevolent creature, Hergé contacted his friend Bernard Heuvelmans, the author of On the Trail of Unknown Animals. After re-reading Heuvelmans' description of the Yeti, Hergé went on to research the cryptid species as much as possible. Hergé interviewed mountaineers, including Herzog, who had spotted the tracks of what he believed was an enormous biped that stopped at the foot of a rock face on Annapurna. The creature's care for the starving Chang derives from a Sherpa account of a Yeti that rescued a little girl in similar circumstances. Another influence came from Fanny Vlaminck, who was interested in extrasensory perception and the mysticism of Tibetan Buddhism, prominent themes in the story that also fascinated Hergé.

=== Publication ===
Panel from Tintin in Tibet, depicting the plane wreckage. When Air India objected to having their plane pictured in a crash, Hergé changed the logo to the fictional Sari-Airways.

Studios Hergé serialised Tintin in Tibet weekly from September 1958 to November 1959, two pages per week, in Tintin magazine. Because of his desire for accuracy, Hergé added the logo of Air India to the airliner crash debris. A representative of Air India complained to Hergé about the adverse publicity the airline might suffer, arguing: "It's scandalous, none of our aircraft has ever crashed; you have done us a considerable wrong". Air India had cooperated with Hergé, aiding his research by providing him reading material, contemporary photographs, and film footage of India and Nepal, particularly Delhi and Kathmandu. (Note: Air India remained in the storyline; the airline flew Tintin, Snowy and Haddock from Europe to Delhi and Kathmandu.) While the crashed aircraft's tail number remained "VT", the country code for Indian aircraft, Hergé agreed to change the airline logo in the published edition to the fictional Sari-Airways, dryly noting that there were so many Indian airlines it was possible that there really was a Sari-Airways.

While developing the story, members of the Studios confronted Hergé with concerns about elements of Tintin in Tibet. Bob de Moor feared the scene in which Haddock crashes into a stupa was disrespectful to Buddhists. Jacques van Melkebeke suggested that the Yeti not be depicted to create a sense of enigma; Hergé disagreed, believing that it would disappoint his child readers.

After the serial concluded, Hergé worked with his publisher, Casterman, to produce the work in book form. Hergé's original design for the front cover featured Tintin and his expedition standing on a backdrop of pure white. Casterman deemed it too abstract, so Hergé added a mountain range at the top; biographer Benoît Peeters expressed that in doing so, the image was deprived of some of its "strength and originality".

During production, Hergé kept abreast of the turbulent political developments in Tibet. In March 1959, Tibet's foremost political and spiritual leader, the Dalai Lama, fled the region into self-imposed exile in India during the 1959 Tibetan uprising. In May 2001, when Tintin in Tibet was published in China, state authorities renamed it Tintin in China's Tibet. When Casterman and the Hergé Foundation protested, the authorities restored the book's original title.

== Reception ==
Hergé came to see Tintin in Tibet as his favourite volume in The Adventures of Tintin. He thought it an ode to friendship, composed "under the double sign of tenacity and friendship": (Note: As quoted in Sadoul, Hergé's inscription in Raymond Leblanc's copy of Tintin in Tibet.) "It's a story of friendship", Hergé said about his book years later, "the way people say, 'It's a love story'". (Note: Hergé said this in his letter to Jean Toulat, 16 January 1975.)

=== Critical analysis ===
Tintin in Tibet is well received by critics from the comics and literary fields. Farr calls it "exceptional in many respects, standing out among the twenty-three completed Tintin adventures ... an assertion of the incorruptible value of bonds of friendship". Jean-Marc Lofficier and Randy Lofficier laud it as "the ultimate Tintin book", reaching "a degree of perfection, both in its story and in its stunning art, that has rarely been equaled, before or since" and "arguably the best book in the series". They detail the story's many emotional moments: Haddock's willingness to sacrifice his life for Tintin's, Tharkey's return, the tearful reunion of Tintin and his starving friend Chang, the reverence paid to Tintin by the Grand Abbot and the monks, and the Yeti's sadness while watching the departure of his only friend. "For a comic book to handle such powerful emotions, convey them to the readers, and make them feel what the characters are feeling is a rare and precious achievement". Thompson calls it "a book of overwhelming whiteness and purity", saying that the "intensely personal nature of the story made this Hergé's favourite Tintin adventure", adding that if readers wonder whether "the enormous weight [was] lifted from Hergé's shoulders, [this] can be seen in his next book, The Castafiore Emerald, a masterpiece of relaxation". As Tintin in Tibet was translated into 32 languages, Donald Lopez, professor of Buddhist and Tibetan studies, calls it the "largest selling book about Tibet".

Literary critic Jean-Marie Apostolidès, in a psychoanalytical analysis of Tintin in Tibet, observes that Tintin is more firmly in control of the plot than he was in earlier adventures. Apostolidès notes that the character displays worry and emotion not present previously, something he suggested showed Tintin sorting out the problems that he faced in life. In his analysis, he calls Tintin a "foundling" and his friend Chang "the lost child" and "Tintin's twin ... the heroes have to struggle to great heights to escape the temporality and pervasive values of [the] universe". He saw the Yeti, who "internalises certain human characteristics", as more complex than Hergé's previous bestial character, Ranko in The Black Island: "The monster loves Chang with a love as unconditional as Tintin's love for his friend".

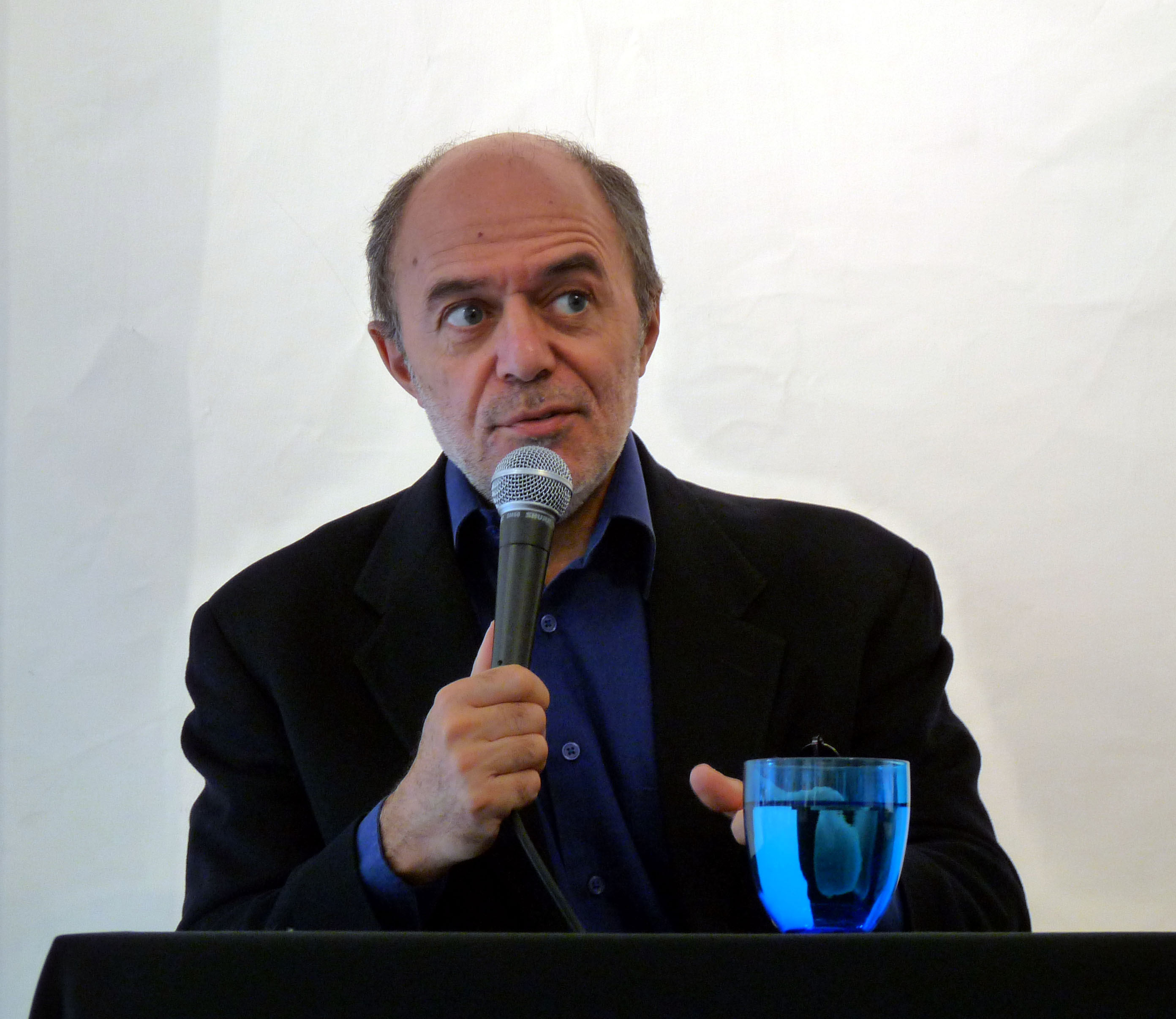
Pierre Assouline calls Tintin in Tibet "a spiritual quest" where the "only conflict is between man and nature".

The literary analysis of Tom McCarthy compares Tintin's quest to Hergé's conquest of his own fear and guilt, writing, "this is the moira of Hergé's own white mythology, his anaemic destiny: to become Sarrasine to Tintin's la Zambinella". (Note: McCarthy is referring to characters Ernest-Jean Sarrasine and his love Zambinella in Honoré de Balzac's Sarrasine. Belgian journalist Pol Vandromme also compared Hergé to Balzac in Le Monde de Tintin, published in 1959.) McCarthy suggested the "icy, white expanses of Hergé's nightmares [may] really have their analogue in his own hero", especially as "Tintin represents an unattainable goal of goodness, cleanness, authenticity".

Hergé biographer Pierre Assouline opines that the work is "a portrait of the artist at a turning point" in his life. He believes that it "stands alone" in The Adventures of Tintin due to its lack of antagonist and few characters, describing it as "a spiritual quest" where the "only conflict is between man and nature ... [Hergé] put the best of himself into Tintin in Tibet". Referring to its "stripped-bare story and archetypal clarity", Benoît Peeters believes Tintin in Tibet to be one of the two "pivotal" books in the series, alongside The Blue Lotus, and deems it poignant that Chang features in both. He also suggests that Hergé included the benevolent Yeti to "make up for the interminable massacre" of animals in the second Tintin adventure, Tintin in the Congo, and that the sadness the Yeti experienced at the story's end reflected Hergé's feelings about his separation from Germaine. Peeters concluded: "Even more than Art Spiegelman's Maus, Tintin in Tibet is perhaps the most moving book in the history of the comic strip".

=== Awards ===
At a ceremony in Brussels on 1 June 2006, the Dalai Lama bestowed the International Campaign for Tibet (ICT)'s Light of Truth Award upon the Hergé Foundation in recognition of Tintin in Tibet, which introduced the region to audiences across the globe. ICT executive director Tsering Jampa said: "For many, Hergé's depiction of Tibet was their introduction to the awe-inspiring landscape and culture of Tibet". During the ceremony, copies of Tintin in Tibet in the Esperanto language (Tinĉjo en Tibeto) were distributed. Accepting the award for the foundation, Hergé's widow Fanny Rodwell (Note: Fanny Vlaminck married Nick Rodwell, Studio Hergé's London merchandising agent and owner of the Covent Garden Tintin Shop in 1993.) said: "We never thought that this story of friendship would have a resonance more than 40 years later".

== Adaptations ==
Eight years after Hergé's death, Tintin in Tibet was adapted into an episode of The Adventures of Tintin (1991–92), a television series by French studio Ellipse and Canadian animation company Nelvana. The episode was directed by Stéphane Bernasconi, with Thierry Wermuth voicing Tintin. Tintin in Tibet was also a 1992 episode of the BBC Radio 4 series The Adventures of Tintin, in which Richard Pearce voiced Tintin. The book became a video game for the PC and Super NES in 1995.

Tintin and I (2003), a documentary by Danish director Anders Høgsbro Østergaard based on Numa Sadoul's 1971 interview with Hergé, includes restored portions of the interview that Hergé had heavily edited and rewritten in Sadoul's book. With full access to the audio recordings, the filmmaker explored the personal issues that the author had while he was creating Tintin in Tibet and how they drove him to create what is now regarded as his most personal adventure.

As the centenary of Hergé's birth approached in 2007, Tintin remained popular. Tintin in Tibet was adapted into a theatrical musical, Hergé's Adventures of Tintin, which ran from late 2005 to early 2006 at the Barbican Arts Centre in London. The production, directed by Rufus Norris and adapted by Norris and David Greig, featured Russell Tovey as Tintin. The musical was revived at the Playhouse Theatre in London's West End before touring in 2007. In 2010, the television channel Arte filmed an episode of its documentary series Sur les traces de Tintin (On the Trail of Tintin) in the Nepalese Himalayas, exploring the inspiration and setting of Tintin in Tibet. From May to September 2012, the Musée Hergé in Louvain-la-Neuve hosted an exhibition about the book, entitled Into Tibet with Tintin.
