= The Black Island =

Comic album by Belgian cartoonist Hergé

The Black Island (L'Île noire)
- Cover of the English edition
- Date: 1938 (black and white); 1943 (colour); 1966 (colour remake)
- Series: The Adventures of Tintin
- Publisher: Casterman

Creative team
- Creator: Hergé

Original publication
- Published in: Le Petit Vingtième
- Date of publication: 15 April 1937 – 16 June 1938
- Language: French

Translation
- Publisher: Methuen
- Date: 1966
- Translator: Leslie Lonsdale-Cooper; Michael Turner

Chronology
- Preceded by: The Broken Ear (1937)
- Followed by: King Ottokar's Sceptre (1939)

The Black Island (French: L'Île noire) is the seventh volume of The Adventures of Tintin, the comics series by Belgian cartoonist Hergé. Commissioned by the conservative Belgian newspaper Le Vingtième Siècle for its children's supplement Le Petit Vingtième, it was serialised weekly from April to November 1937. The story tells of young Belgian reporter Tintin and his dog Snowy, who travel to England in pursuit of a gang of counterfeiters. Framed for theft and hunted by detectives Thomson and Thompson, Tintin follows the criminals to Scotland, discovering their lair on the Black Island.

The Black Island was a commercial success and was published in book form by Casterman shortly after its conclusion. Hergé continued The Adventures of Tintin with King Ottokar's Sceptre, while the series itself became a defining part of the Franco-Belgian comics tradition. In 1943, The Black Island was coloured and re-drawn in Hergé's distinctive ligne-claire style for republication. In the mid-1960s, Hergé's British publishers requested a major revision of the story, for which he sent his assistant Bob De Moor to Britain on a research trip; on his return, Studios Hergé produced a revised, third edition of the story, serialised in Tintin magazine. The Black Island introduces the recurring villain Dr. Müller, and has been widely cited as one of the most popular instalments in the series. The story was adapted for the 1957 Belvision animation Hergé's Adventures of Tintin, the 1980–81 West End play Tintin and the Black Island, the 1991 Ellipse/Nelvana animated series The Adventures of Tintin, and the 1992–93 BBC Radio 5 dramatisation of the Adventures.

== Synopsis ==
Tintin witnesses a plane land in the Belgian countryside experiencing engine trouble, and is shot by the pilot when he offers his help. While he recovers in hospital, detectives Thomson and Thompson visit him and inform him that the plane subsequently flew to Sussex, England, where it crashed. Tintin and Snowy proceed to Sussex, but along the way, while onboard a train two criminals frame Tintin for robbery, and he is arrested by Thomson and Thompson; he escapes, but is pursued by the detectives. After arriving in England by ferry in Newhaven, both Tintin and the taxi driver are ambushed by the same criminals, who attempt to kill him over the cliffs of Seaford, but he escapes with Snowy's help. Discovering the plane wreckage, he finds a torn-up note in the pilot's jacket, and following the writing on it arrives at the estate of Dr. J. W. Müller, a German who owns a mental institution, affiliated with the criminals. Tintin and Snowy are chased by a large guard dog; Tintin stumbles, but the dog instead goes after a bone held by Snowy. Müller captures Tintin, but during a fight Müller's house catches fire. The fire brigade arrives just in time to extinguish the fire and rescue Tintin from the burning house, while Müller escapes with his accomplice Ivan.

The following morning after recovering in hospital, Tintin finds electric cables and red beacons in the garden, surmising that they are there designed to attract a plane drop. At night, he lights the beacons, and a plane drops sacks of counterfeit money, revealing that Müller is part of a gang of forgers. Tintin pursues Müller and Ivan by car and by train across the country. Along the way, Thompson and Thomson try to arrest him again, but Tintin convinces them to join him in the pursuit of the criminals. When Müller takes a plane north, Tintin and Snowy try to follow, but hit a storm and crash land in rural Scotland in foggy conditions. While Tintin changes into his iconic Scottish outfit, the detectives commandeer another plane, but discover - too late - that the man they told to fly it is actually a mechanic who has never flown before, and after a harrowing air-bound odyssey they end up crash-landing into (and winning) an aerobatics competition.

Learning that Müller's plane had crashed off the coast of Kiltoch, a Scottish coastal village, Tintin travels there to continue his investigation. At Kiltoch, an old Scotsman tells him the story of Black Island — an island off the coast where a "ferocious beast" kills any visitors. Tintin and Snowy travel to the island, where they find that the "beast" is a trained gorilla named Ranko. They further discover that the forgers are using the island as their base, and radio the police for help. Although the forgers attempt to capture Tintin, the police arrives and arrests the criminals. Ranko, who was injured during Tintin's attempts to hold off the forgers, becomes docile enough to allow Tintin to bring him to a zoo.

== History ==
=== Background and research ===
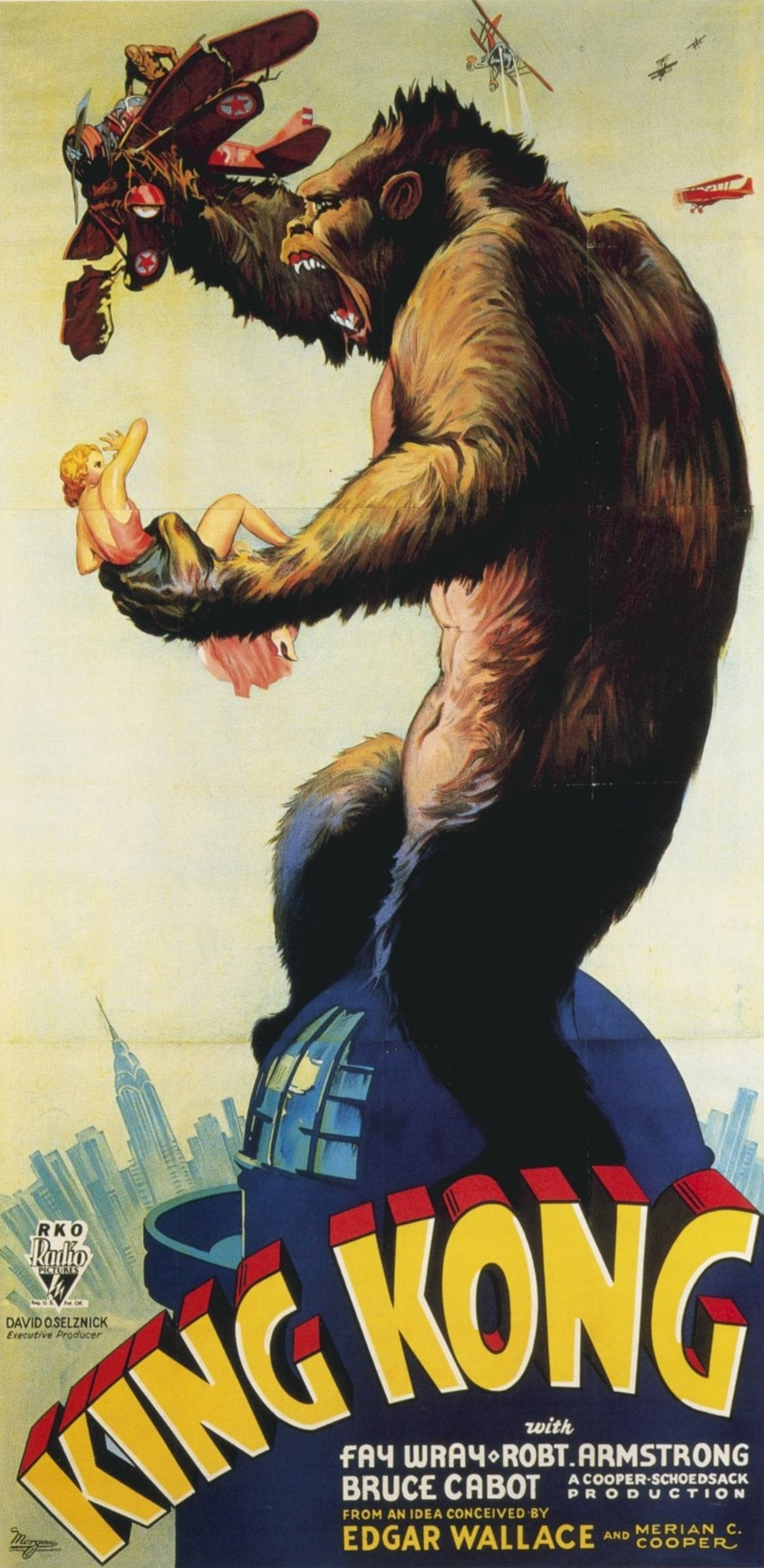
Poster for the 1933 film King Kong, whose protagonist would serve as Hergé's inspiration for Ranko

Georges Remi—best known under the pen name Hergé—was employed as editor and illustrator of Le Petit Vingtième ("The Little Twentieth"), a children's supplement to Le Vingtième Siècle ("The Twentieth Century"), a staunchly Roman Catholic, conservative Belgian newspaper based in Hergé's native Brussels which was run by the Abbé Norbert Wallez. In 1929, Hergé began The Adventures of Tintin comic strip for Le Petit Vingtième, revolving around the exploits of fictional Belgian reporter Tintin. Wallez ordered Hergé to set his first adventure in the Soviet Union as anti-socialist propaganda for children (Tintin in the Land of the Soviets), to set his second adventure in the Belgian Congo to encourage colonial sentiment (Tintin in the Congo), and to set his third adventure in the United States to use the story as a denunciation of American capitalism (Tintin in America). Wallez was subsequently removed from the paper's editorship following a scandal, although Hergé was convinced to stay on the condition of a salary increase.

For his next serial, Hergé planned to put together a story that caricatured the actions of Nazi Germany, developing the plot for King Ottokar's Sceptre. However, he temporarily set aside that project when he began to experience dreams of white and a car stuck in the snow, having ideas of sending Tintin to the north, considering Greenland or the Klondike as potential locations. The result was The Black Island, although Hergé only sent Tintin as far north as Scotland, and he instead used the idea of the car stuck in a snowdrift on a greetings card that he designed. He also had an idea of Tintin combating a group of anarchists bent on destroying Europe's iconic buildings, but again this idea did not make it into the eventual story. Having decided to set most of his story in Britain, Hergé briefly visited London and the southern English coast to learn more about the country. There, he purchased a stainless steel Gillott's Inqueduct G-2 pen, a type that he would continue to use throughout his life. His positive depiction of Britain was in part due to an Anglophilia that he had received from his childhood, with the British government having been a longstanding ally of Belgium, supporting its 1831 creation and liberating it from German occupation during the First World War.

Hergé retained the anti-German sentiment that he had first considered for King Ottokar's Sceptre through the inclusion of a German villain, Dr. Müller, who would go on to become a recurring character in the Tintin series. He based the character largely on Georg Bell, a Scottish forger who had been a vocal supporter of the Nazi regime, and who he had learned about from a February 1934 article of the anti-conformist Belgian magazine La Crapouillot (The Mortar Shell). Müller's counterfeiting operations were inspired by Bell's actions, as he was involved in a plot to destabilise Soviet Russia through counterfeiting Russian roubles. Rather than Germans, Müller's henchmen were given the Russian names Ivan and Wronzoff, although the latter would be renamed Puschov by Michael Turner and Leslie Lonsdale-Cooper for the English translation. Forging banknotes was a topical crime at the time, while the idea of villains using superstition to hide their lair was a common trope, one that Hergé had used previously in Tintin in the Land of the Soviets. The idea of Ranko brought together two popular fictional creatures of the 1930s; the giant ape King Kong, who had been introduced in the film King Kong (1933), and the Loch Ness Monster, a cryptid who was to have lived in Loch Ness. Gaston Leroux's character of Balaoo the gorilla, who had appeared in a 1911 book and a 1913 film, might also have been an influence on Ranko. The plot and themes of the story were also influenced by Alfred Hitchcock's 1935 film The 39 Steps, itself an adaptation of John Buchan's 1915 adventure novel.

=== Original publication ===
The Black Island was first serialised in Le Petit Vingtième from 15 April to 16 November 1937 under the title Le Mystère De L'Avion Gris (The Mystery of the Grey Plane). From 17 April 1938, the story was also serialised in the French Catholic newspaper, Cœurs Vaillants. In 1938, Éditions Casterman collected the story together in a single hardcover volume, publishing it under the title L'Île noire (The Black Island). Hergé however was unhappy with this publication due to errors throughout, most egregiously that the front cover omitted his name.

The inclusion of a television in the original version would have surprised many readers. The BBC had only introduced television to Britain in the late 1930s (suspended entirely until 1946) and Belgium would not have television until 1955.

=== Second and third versions ===
In the 1940s and 1950s, when Hergé's popularity had increased, he and his team at Studios Hergé redrew and coloured many of the original black-and-white Tintin adventures. They used the ligne claire ("clear line") drawing style that Hergé had developed, in this way ensuring that the earlier stories fitted in visually alongside the new Adventures of Tintin being created. Casterman published this second, colourised version of the story in 1943, reduced from 124 pages to 60. This second version contained no significant changes from the original 1937 one, although the black-and-white television screen that had appeared in the 1930s version was now depicted as a colour screen, despite the fact that such technology was not yet available.

In the early 1960s, Hergé's English language publishers, Methuen, were planning on translating and publishing The Black Island for the British market. Methuen believed that many British readers would find the depiction of Britain in the comic inaccurate and out-of-date, and drew up a list of 131 errors that they asked Hergé to rectify before they would publish it in English. They were also aware that the work would appear particularly dated when compared with some of the most recently published Adventures like Destination Moon and The Calculus Affair, which made use of advanced technologies in their plot. At the time, Hergé was busy producing the twenty-second Tintin story, Flight 714 to Sydney, and so did not have the time to undertake research into contemporary British society and culture. Instead, he sent his assistant Bob De Moor to Britain in October 1961, where he visited such sites as Batemans and the White Cliffs of Dover, making many observations as to new developments in clothing and architecture. While in England, De Moor sought out various contemporary uniforms to use as a basis for more accurate illustrations. A police constabulary lent him a police uniform, although when he asked British Rail if he could borrow one of their uniforms, their staff were suspicious and refused.

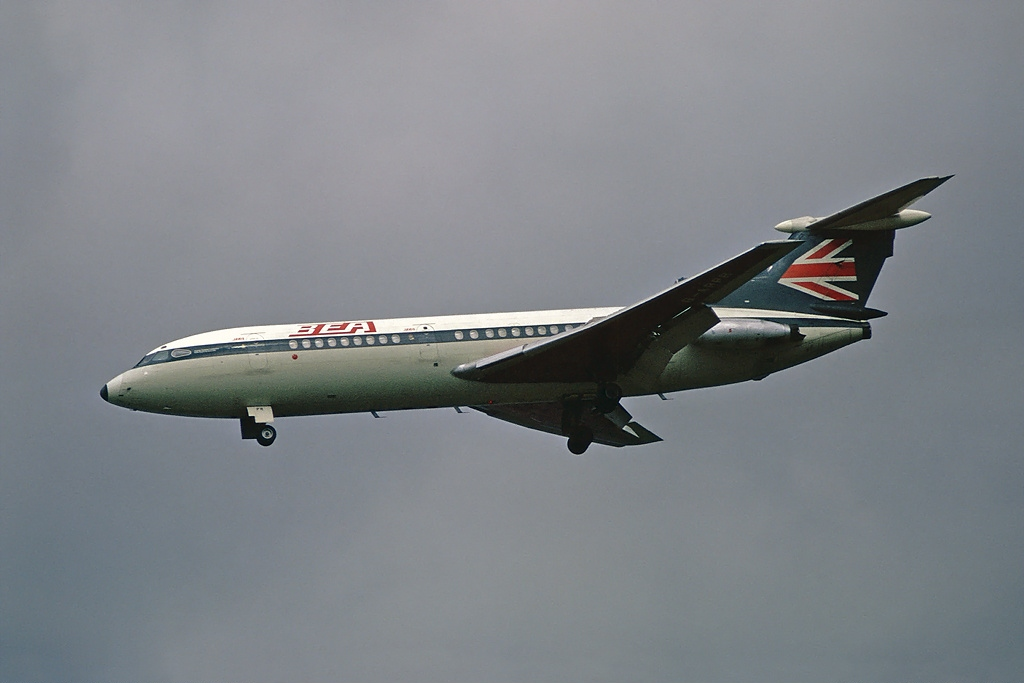
A British European Airways (BEA) Trident, one of the aircraft updated for the 1965 version

The new version was serialised in Tintin magazine from June to December 1965, before Casterman published it in a collected volume in 1966. Studios Hergé made many alterations to the illustrations as a result of De Moor's research. Reflecting the fact that television had become increasingly commonplace in Western Europe, Hergé changed the prose from "It's a television set!" to "It's only a television set!" However, as colour television was not yet available in Britain, the screen on the television encountered in Britain was once again reverted to black-and-white. Additionally, at least one line of dialogue was "softened" from the original version - in one scene where Tintin aims a pistol at two of the counterfeiters, he states, "Get back! And put up your hands!" compared to the original's "One more step and you're dead!". The counterfeit notes that Tintin finds were also increased in value, from one pound to five pounds. The multiple aircraft featured throughout the story were redrawn by Studios member Roger Leloup, who replaced the depiction of planes that were operational in the 1930s to those active at the time, such as a Percival Prentice, a D.H. Chipmunk, a Cessna 150, a Tiger Moth, and a British European Airways Hawker Siddeley Trident.

The clothing worn by characters was brought up-to-date, while the old steam locomotives that were initially featured were replaced by more modern diesel or electrified alternatives. Adverts for the genuine Johnnie Walker whisky were replaced by adverts for the fictional in-universe Loch Lomond whisky, while a Sussex County Council signpost was added to page 11. Various English towns and villages were renamed, with Puddlecombe becoming Littlegate, and Eastbury becoming Eastdown, while Scottish pub Ye Dolphin was renamed The Kiltoch Arms. The police were no longer depicted as carrying guns, as was accurate, while the journalists Christopher Willoughby-Drupe and Marco Rizotto, who had first appeared in The Castafiore Emerald (1963), were retroactively added into the background of one scene. With the backgrounds and other elements of the new version drawn by staff members of the Studios, the only thing drawn by Hergé in the 1966 version was the characters themselves.

The idea of Tintin travelling to England created a problem for English translators, as Metheun's policy had Anglicised the series by moving Tintin's home from Brussels to London. In the first act after his wounding by a smuggler pilot, Tintin is originally told by one of the Twins that "We're leaving for England." In English this becomes "We're going back to England," with no explanation as to why all the main characters were in the same continental town simultaneously.

=== Later publications ===
Casterman republished the original black-and-white version of the story in 1980, as part of their Archives Hergé collection. In 1986, they then published a facsimile version of that first edition, that they followed in 1996 with the publication of a facsimile of the second, 1943 edition.

== Critical analysis ==
Harry Thompson thought that The Black Island expressed a "convenient, hitherto unsuspected regard for the British" on Hergé's behalf, with Britain itself appearing as "a little quaint". He thought that it "outstrips its predecessors" both artistically and comedically, describing it as "one of the most popular Tintin stories". He felt that some of the logically implausible slapstick scenes illustrated "the last flicker of 1920s Tintin", but that the 1966 version was "a fine piece of work and one of the most beautifully drawn Tintin books". Michael Farr commented on the "distinct quality and special popularity" of The Black Island. He thought that the inclusion of many airplanes and a television in the first version was symptomatic of Hergé's interest in innovation and modernism. Commenting on the differences between the third version of the comic and the earlier two, he thought that the latter was "strongly representative" of the artistic talents of Studios Hergé in the 1960s, but that it was nevertheless inferior, because it had replaced the "spontaneity and poetry" of the original with "over-detailed and fussily accurate" illustrations.

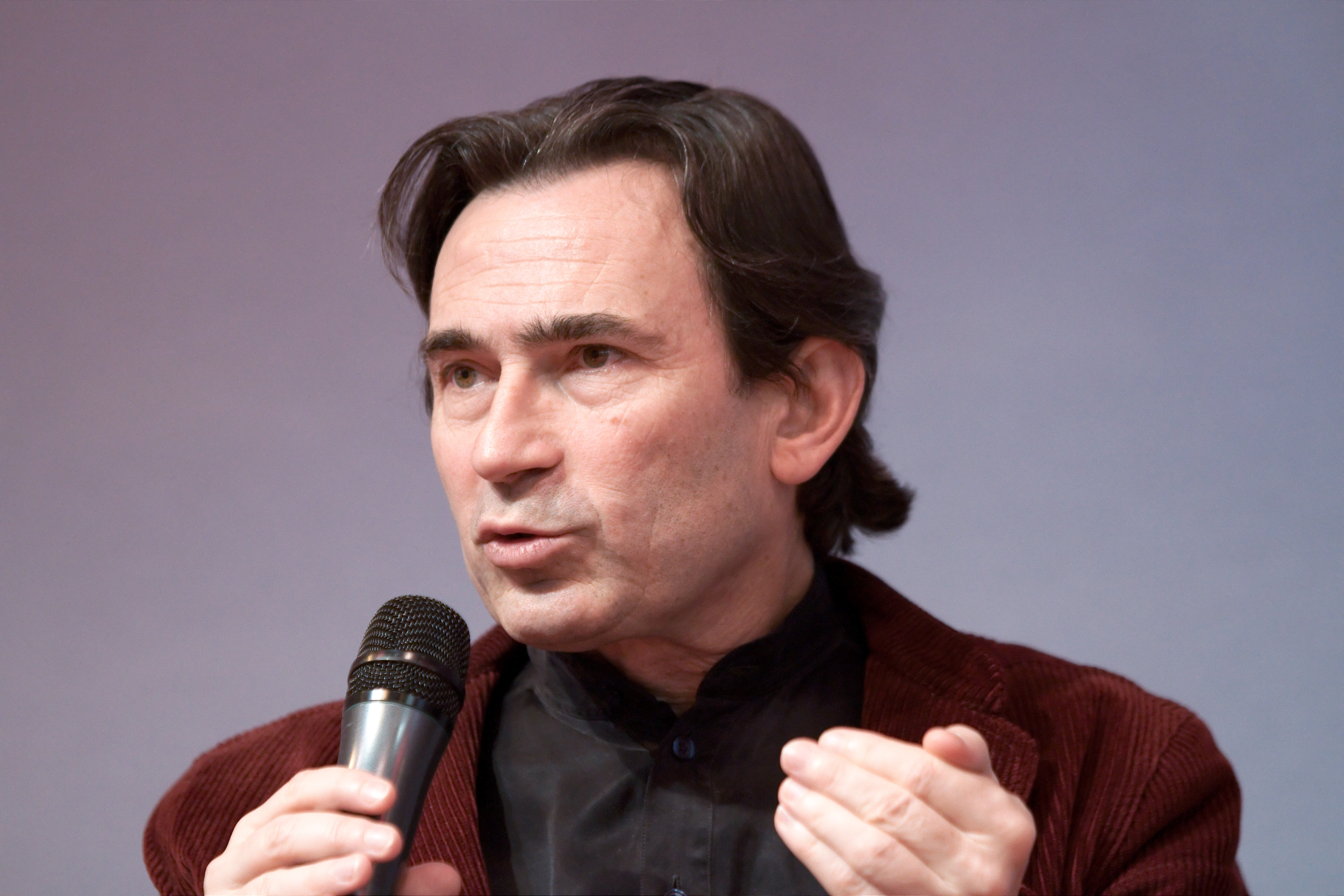
Hergé biographer Benoît Peeters considered The Black Island to be a "pure detective story".

Jean-Marc and Randy Lofficier described The Black Island as "a clever little thriller" that bore similarities with the popular detective serials of the era. The Lofficiers thought that the 1966 version "gained in slickness" but became less atmospheric, awarding it two out of five. Biographer Benoît Peeters thought The Black Island to be "a pure detective story", describing it as "Remarkably well constructed" and highlighting that it contrasted the modern world of counterfeiters, airplanes, and television, with the mysteries of superstition and the historic castle. He described it as "an adventure full of twists and turns", with the characters Thompson and Thomson being "on top form". He nevertheless considered the 1966 version to be "shorter on charm" than the earlier versions. Elsewhere he was more critical, stating that "under the guise of modernization, a real massacre occurred", and adding that "the new Black Island was more than just a failure; it also showed one of the limitations of the Hergéan system", in that it was obsessed with repeated redrawing.

Literary critic Jean-Marie Apostolidès of Stanford University believed that The Black Island expanded on a variety of themes that Hergé had explored in his earlier work, such as the idea of counterfeiting and Snowy's fondness for whisky. He thought that there was a human-animal link in the story, with Tintin's hair matching Snowy's fur in a similar manner to how Wronzoff's beard matched Ranko's fur coat. However, he added that while Tintin's relationship with Snowy was wholly one based in good, Wronzoff's connection with Ranko is one rooted in evil. By living on an island, Apostolidès thought that Wronzoff was like "a new Robinson Crusoe", also highlighting that it was the first use of the island theme in Hergé's work. Literary critic Tom McCarthy thought that The Black Island linked to Hergé's other Adventures in various ways; he connected the counterfeit money in the story to the counterfeit idol in The Broken Ear and the fake bunker in Tintin in the Land of the Soviets. He also connected Tintin's solving of the puzzle in the airman's jacket to his solving of the pirate puzzles in The Secret of the Unicorn, and that in transmitting from a place of death, Ben Mor, or mort (death), it linked to Tintin's transmitting from the crypt of Marlinspike Hall in The Secret of the Unicorn.

== Adaptations ==
The Black Island is one of The Adventures of Tintin that was adapted for the second series of the animated Hergé's Adventures of Tintin by the Belgian studio Belvision in 1957. Belvision's adaptation, directed by Ray Goossens and written by Michel Greg, divided The Black Island up into 5-minute colour episodes that diverted from Hergé's original plot in a variety of ways. The French studio Ellipse and Canadian animation company Nelvana subsequently adapted the comic into a 1991 episode of The Adventures of Tintin television series. Directed by Stéphane Bernasconi, Thierry Wermuth voiced the character of Tintin.

In 1980, London's Unicorn Theatre staged a theatrical version of the book as Tintin and the Black Island, adapted by Geoffrey Case and directed by Tony Wredden. The cast included Richard Drabble as Tintin, Haluk Bilginer as Müller, Hugh Hayes as Ivan and Carl Heap as Ranko (with a new character, Olga, being played by Léda Hodgson). The production toured the UK during 1981, and was translated into French for a run in Quebec during 1984.

In 1992, a radio adaption by the BBC was first broadcast on Radio 5. It was produced by John Yorke, Tintin was voiced by Richard Pearce and Snowy by Andrew Sachs.

On 19 March 2010, the British TV network Channel 4 broadcast a documentary titled Dom Joly and The Black Island in which the comedian Dom Joly dressed up as Tintin and followed in Tintin's footsteps from Ostend to Sussex and then to Scotland. Reviewing the documentary in The Guardian, Tim Dowling commented: "It was amusing in parts, charming in others and a little gift for Tintinophiles everywhere. A Tintinologist, I fear, would not learn much he or she didn't already know".

== See also ==
- Île d'Or
