= Goddin =

Goddin is a surname. Notable people with the surname include:

- Melvin Goddin, American politician
- Philippe Goddin (1944-2025), Belgian author and critic
