= List of books about Tintin =

This is a list of books about The Adventures of Tintin, the comics series by Belgian cartoonist Hergé.

== Books in English ==
- Tintin and the World of Hergé by Benoit Peeters (1983)
- Hergé and Tintin, Reporters by Philippe Goddin (1986)
- Tintin: 60 Years of Adventure by Michael Farr (1989)
- Tintin: Hergé and his Creation by Harry Thompson (1991)
- Tintin in the New World : A Romance (1993) by Frederic Tuten – a novel that transplants Tintin from his comic book confines into a fleshed out, realistic world with all its wicked, grave and abstruse trappings. The cover of the novel features a specially commissioned painting by Roy Lichtenstein who used his hallmark Benday-dot technique to depict Tintin and Snowy in a near-miss with a would-be assassin's knife.
- Hergé: The Man Who Created Tintin by Pierre Assouline (1996) (2009)
- Tintin: The Complete Companion by Michael Farr (2001)
- Hergé: Son of Tintin by Benoît Peeters (2002) (2012)
- The Pocket Essential Tintin by Jean-Marc Lofficier and Randy Lofficier (2002)
- The Adventures of Tintin at Sea by Yves Horeau, edited and translated by Michael Farr (2004) – issued in conjunction with an exhibition focusing on Tintin's exploits at sea at the National Maritime Museum in London, which was organised in partnership with the Hergé Foundation, the exhibition commemorated the 75th anniversary of the publication of Tintin's first adventure.
- Tintin and the Secret of Literature by Tom McCarthy (2006) – a rather obscurely written work which attempts through literary analysis to identify themes in 'great literature' by such authors as Aeschylus, Balzac, Conrad and Henry James in the Tintin comic series. Reviewed in Clements, Toby (2006-07-09). "Tintin and the Enigma of Academic Obsession". The Daily Telegraph (Review). p. 6. Archived from the original on 2008-05-27.
- Tintin and Co. by Michael Farr (2007)
- The Adventures of Hergé: Creator of Tintin by Michael Farr (2007)
- The Art of Herge: Inventor of Tintin, Volume 1, 1907-1937 by Philippe Goddin, translated by Michael Farr (2007)
- The Art of Herge: Inventor of Tintin, Volume 2, 1937-1949 by Philippe Goddin, translated by Michael Farr (2009)
- The Metamorphoses of Tintin, or Tintin for Adults by Jean-Marie Apostolidès (2010)
- The Art of Herge: Inventor of Tintin, Volume 3, 1950-1983 by Philippe Goddin, translated by Michael Farr (2011)
- The Adventures of Hergé by Jose-Louis Bocquet and Jean-Luc Fromental (2011)
