= Algernon Methuen =

English publisher and teacher

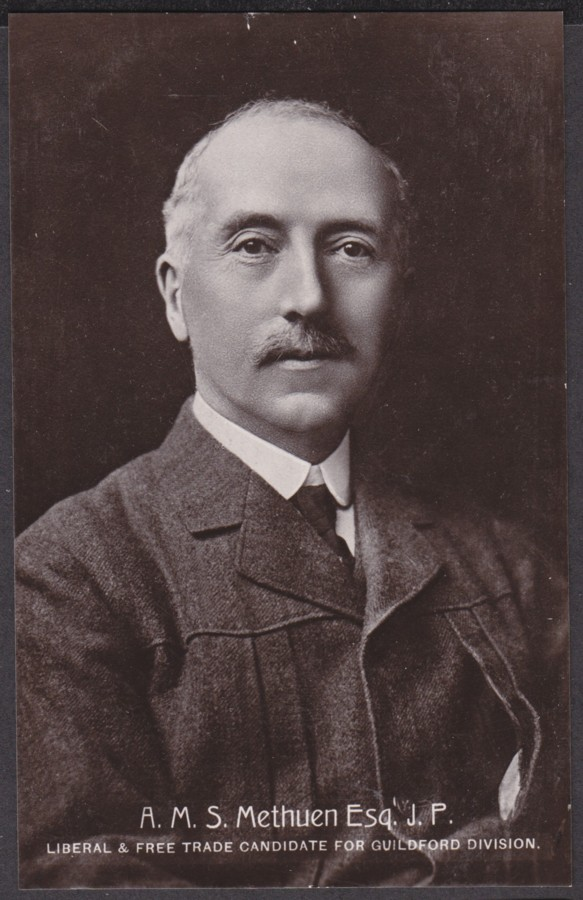
Algernon Methuen, c. 1910

Sir Algernon Marshall Stedman Methuen, Baronet (/ˈældʒərnən ˈmɛθjuən/; 23 February 1856 – 20 September 1924) was an English publisher and a teacher of Classics and French. He is best known for founding the publishing company Methuen & Co.

== Background and education ==
Methuen was born as Algernon Methuen Marshall Stedman in London, the third son of John Buck Stedman, FRCS, and Jane Elizabeth née Marshall. He was educated at Berkhamsted School and then Wadham College, Oxford, from which he graduated with an MA.

== Career ==
After graduating from Oxford, Methuen entered teaching, and rose to become head of High Croft Preparatory School at Milford in Surrey from 1890 to 1895. While teaching he began, as a sideline, writing a number of school textbooks under the nom-de-plume A. W. S. Methuen, of which his series on French, Greek and Latin were best known. Among his works were books on gardening and current affairs. In June 1889, Methuen began to publish and market his own textbooks under the label Methuen & Co. (later Methuen Publishing Ltd.). Two months later he formally adopted Methuen as his surname. His first success at publishing came in 1892 with the publication of Rudyard Kipling's Barrack-Room Ballads. He later published works by Hilaire Belloc, Robert Louis Stevenson, and Oscar Wilde.

Methuen was an outspoken critic of the Boer War. He stood for Parliament as the Liberal party candidate for the seat of Guildford in the General Election of January 1910. The seat was a safe Conservative seat and he was unsuccessful. In 1916, he was created a baronet, of Haslemere in Surrey, and he later published his own memoir.

== Personal life ==
Methuen married Emily Caroline Bedford in 1884. He died in September 1924, aged 68, when the baronetcy became extinct.

Baronetage of the United Kingdom
New creation	Baronet (of Haslemere); 1916–1924	Extinct
