= Tintin postage stamps =

First Tintin postage stamp.

This is a list of postage stamps, released in Belgium and in other countries around the world, honoring The Adventures of Tintin, the comics series by Belgian cartoonist Hergé.

== List of issues ==
=== Belgium ===
In 1979, a one-off stamp was released on October 1, 1979. The stamp featured Tintin and Snowy with a magnifying glass examining a stamp depicting Captain Haddock. The stamp would be featured on the front cover of Harry Thompson's book, Tintin, Hergé and his Creation.

In 1999, a stamp which depicts a model of the Moon rocket (Destination Moon and Explorers on the Moon) was released on 15 October.

In 2000, a one-off stamp of Tintin moving a puppet of Hergé was released.

In February 2004, the Belgian post office released a set of five stamps to commemorate the 75th anniversary of Tintin, the 50th anniversary of the book Explorers on the Moon and the 35th anniversary of Neil Armstrong's Apollo 11 Moon landing.

In 2007, to celebrate the centenary of Hergé, the Belgian post office released a series of 25 stamps, 24 of which depict one of the album covers each in a different language, and one showing a picture of Hergé.

=== Netherlands ===
A set of two stamps was released in September 1999. Each showed a scene from the book Explorers on the Moon.

=== France ===
A one-off stamp and a minisheet was released on March 11, 2000.

In 2007, a set of six stamps, each depicting one of the characters - Tintin and Snowy, Professor Calculus, Captain Haddock, Thomson and Thompson, Bianca Castafiore and Chang. A minisheet comprising all the six stamps was issued along with the stamps.

=== Democratic Republic of the Congo/Belgium ===
A joint issue from the two countries depicted the two book covers of Tintin in the Congo.

== See also ==
Tintin coins
