= Melvin Goddin =

Texas politician (??–??)

Melvin Goddin was a state legislator in Texas.

He was a delegate to the 1875 Texas Constitutional Convention. He was one of six African American delegates, all Republicans. He resigned on the convention's second day. He represented the fifteenth district. He resigned, and his place was filled by a Democrat.
