= Methuen Publishing =

UK book publishing company

Methuen Books
- Founded: 1889 (137 years ago)
- Founder: Algernon Methuen
- Country of origin: United Kingdom
- Headquarters location: 1 Wheelgate; Malton; YO17 7HT; North Yorkshire
- Distribution: Penguin Random House (most books, including the current Methuen Books); Routledge (academic); HarperCollins (children's books); A & C Black (dramas)
- Publication types: Books
- Official website: methuen.co.uk

Methuen Publishing Ltd (/ˈmɛθjuən/; also known as Methuen Books) is an English publishing house.

It was founded in 1889 by Sir Algernon Methuen (1856–1924) and began publishing in London in 1892. Initially, Methuen mainly published non-fiction academic works, eventually diversifying to encourage female authors and later translated works. E. V. Lucas headed the firm from 1924 to 1938.

== Establishment ==
In June 1889, as a sideline to teaching, Algernon Methuen began to publish and market his own textbooks under the label Methuen & Co. The company's first success came in 1892 with the publication of Rudyard Kipling's Barrack-Room Ballads. Rapid growth came with works by Marie Corelli, Hilaire Belloc, Robert Louis Stevenson, and Oscar Wilde (De Profundis, 1905) as well as Edgar Rice Burroughs' Tarzan of the Apes.

In 1910, the business was converted into a limited liability company with E. V. Lucas and G. E. Webster joining the founder on the board of directors. The company published the 1920 English translation of Albert Einstein's Relativity, the Special and the General Theory: A Popular Exposition.

With knowledge he had gained of children's literature at the publisher Grant Richards, E. V. Lucas built on the company's early success. Methuen published The Blue Bird: A Fairy Play in Six Acts by Maurice Maeterlinck (winner of the Nobel Prize in Literature 1911) in an English translation by Alexander Teixeira de Mattos. Among the authors Lucas signed to the company were A. A. Milne, Kenneth Grahame, while he also supported illustrators W. Heath Robinson, H. M. Bateman and E. H. Shepard. By the 1920s, it had also a literary list that included Anthony Hope, G. K. Chesterton, Henry James, D. H. Lawrence, T. S. Eliot, Ruth Manning-Sanders and The Arden Shakespeare series.

== The Rainbow ==
Following the publication of D. H. Lawrence's The Rainbow (1915), Methuen was prosecuted for obscenity. The firm offered no defence and agreed to destroy the remaining stock of 1,011 copies. It is thought that one reason for the firm's failure to support Lawrence was that he had at the time written an unkind portrait of the chief editor's brother, who had recently been killed in France.

== Edward Verrall Lucas ==
In 1924, E. V. Lucas succeeded Algernon Methuen as chairman and led the company until his death in 1938. Besides his executive role, he also received a separate salary as the chief reader of the company. His commercial judgment added authors Enid Blyton, P. G. Wodehouse, Pearl S. Buck and Maurice Maeterlinck to the company's list. In 1935, they published Daniele Varè's novel The Maker of Heavenly Trousers.

In 1930, the company published the popular humorous book 1066 and All That.

== Tintin ==
Methuen was the English publisher of the book editions of The Adventures of Tintin, a series of classic Belgian comic-strip books, written and illustrated by Hergé. Methuen altered their editions of Tintin by insisting that books featuring British characters undergo major changes. The Black Island, first published in French in 1937, was set in the United Kingdom, but, prior to publishing it themselves in 1966, Methuen decided that it did not reflect the U.K. accurately enough and sent a list of 131 "errors" to be corrected. It was thus redrawn and reset in the 1960s. Critics have attacked Methuen over the changes, claiming that The Black Island lost a lot of its charm as a result. Land of Black Gold had had a troubled publishing history, but the completed adventure eventually appeared in 1948–1950. It was set in the British Mandate of Palestine and featured the conflict between Jews, Arabs, and British troops. When Methuen was translating the Adventures of Tintin into English, Israel had long since been in existence, and Methuen asked for it to be edited. Hergé took the opportunity to redraw the few problematic pages, as well as the pages before that: the freighter that appeared before that was based on Hergé's imagination, due to lack of resources at the time. The earlier version, published in 1950, was reprinted by Casterman as a facsimile edition, but internationally was completely replaced by the newer version.

== Children's imprint ==
Methuen Children's Books, under the leadership of Olive Jones, Charles Shirley and Marilyn Malin, has been described as "an outward-looking company whose sense of identity was enhanced by bright design, a keen marketing drive, and a strong European flavour".

== Recent history ==
In 1958, Methuen was part of the conglomerate Associated Book Publishers (ABP), and for much of the 1970s was known as Eyre Methuen following its absorption of the Eyre & Spottiswoode firm. When ABP was acquired by the Thomson Organization in 1987, it sold off the trade publishing units, including Methuen, to Reed International's Octopus. Reed sold off its trade publishing to Random House in February 1997. Methuen Drama bought itself out in 1998, while retaining the distribution and warehousing services with Random House. That same year, Reed sold Methuen's children's catalogue to the Egmont Group. Egmont Group sold its UK book division to HarperCollins in 2020.

In 2003, Methuen Drama purchased the company Politico's Publishing from its owner Iain Dale. In 2006, Methuen sold its notable drama lists to A & C Black for £2.35 million.

Penguin Random House now owns the rights to many books that used to be published under the Methuen name through Random House and the Adrian Mole franchise through Penguin Books, the company also distributed the titles of now-independent Methuen Books. Many of the publisher's academic titles are now published by Routledge.

Methuen Books continues to publish new works of fiction and non-fiction, as well as reprinting older, classic works. Contemporary Methuen authors include Mark Dunn, Robert McKee, Michael Palin, 1986 Nobel Prize winner Wole Soyinka, and 2012 Nobel Prize winner Mo Yan. Classic Methuen authors include the American novelist Walker Percy, the American academic and commentator Neil Postman, and the British cartoonist Norman Thelwell.
