= Tintin coins =

Belgian commemorative coins

This is a list of commemorative coins, released in Belgium, honoring The Adventures of Tintin, the comics series by Belgian cartoonist Hergé.

== List of coins ==
- Belgium, 2004 - Tintin's 75th anniversary: Released on 4 January. A 10 euro silver coin that commemorates his 75th anniversary. It was a limited run of 50,000 and they were initially sold for 31 euros each. They are legal tender only in Belgium.
- Belgium, 2004 - Explorers of the Moon's 50th anniversary: Released in late June. A 10 euro coin that commemorates the 50th anniversary of the book Explorers on the Moon. Limited run of 10,000.
- Belgium, 2007 - Hergé's centenary: Commemorates the centenary of Hergé.

== See also ==
- Tintin postage stamps
