= Michael Farr =

British Tintin expert

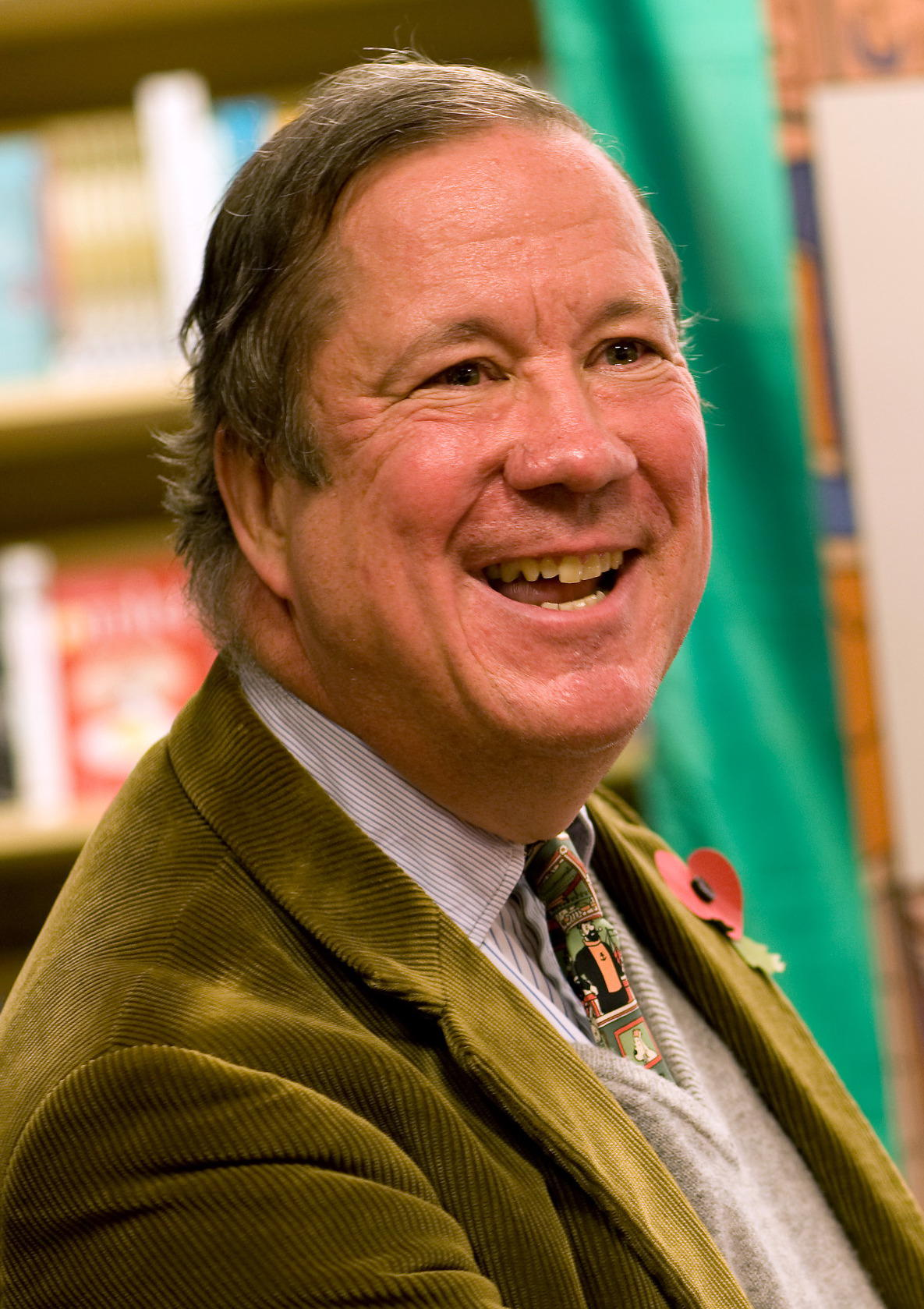
This is an image depicting author Michael Farr

Michael Farr (born 1953) is a British expert on the comic series The Adventures of Tintin and its creator, Hergé. He has written several books on the subject as well as translating several others into English. A former reporter, he has also written about other subjects.

== Biography ==
Michael Farr was born in 1953 in Paris to an Austrian-Czech mother, Hildegarde Farr (née Pisarowitz) and a British journalist father, Walter Farr. Educated at Harrow School, and then a history scholar at Trinity College Cambridge, he read Theology as his part one before changing to Fine Art in which he gained an MA. He became a reporter, first for Reuters and then the Daily Telegraph, travelling around the world as a foreign correspondent. After meeting Hergé, Farr started writing books about Tintin. Farr was the first to gain full access to the files and material Hergé had used in developing the Tintin stories, for his book Tintin: The Complete Companion.

In 2004 Farr was interviewed on BBC News in a section on the Tintin exhibition at the National Maritime Museum, Greenwich. He appeared in 2003 in the documentary film, Tintin and I. He now lives in London with his German wife and daughter.

Farr is multilingual in English, French, German and Italian. He wrote a French version of Tintin: The Complete Companion at the same time as he wrote the English version.

== Bibliography ==
=== Books on Tintin ===
- Tintin, 60 years Of Adventure ISBN 978-2-203-00405-4
- Tintin: The Complete Companion ISBN 978-0-7195-5522-0
- Tintin & Co. ISBN 978-1-4052-3264-7
- Tintin
- Snowy
- Haddock
- Calculus
- Castafiore
- Thomson and Thompson
- Chang
- Alcazar
- Lampion
- Müller
- Rastapopoulos
- Abdullah
- The Adventures Of Hergé, Creator Of Tintin

=== Tintin-related books translated into English ===
- Tintin and the World of Hergé by Benoit Peeters
- Hergé and Tintin, Reporters by Philippe Goddin
- The Adventures of Tintin at Sea by Yves Horeau
- The Art of Hergé, Inventor of Tintin, Vol. I by Philippe Goddin
- The Art of Hergé, Inventor of Tintin, Vol. II by Philippe Goddin
- The Art of Hergé, Inventor of Tintin, Vol. III by Philippe Goddin
- All the digital versions of The Adventures of Tintin released via Moulinsart's official Tintin app in Apple's App Store (the original Michael Turner and Leslie Lonsdale-Cooper translations are not used for the digital releases)
- Tintin in America new 2020 Moulsinart translation for colorized edition of the original 1932 version.

=== Other books ===
- Vanishing Borders
- Berlin! Berlin!
