= Norbert Wallez =

Belgian Catholic priest and journalist (1882-1952)

Abbé Norbert Wallez (French: [valɛz]; 19 October 1882 – 24 September 1952) was a Belgian Catholic priest and journalist. He was the editor of the newspaper Le Vingtième Siècle (The Twentieth Century), whose youth supplement, Le Petit Vingtième, first published The Adventures of Tintin.

== Biography ==
Wallez was born in Hacquegnies, Frasnes-lez-Anvaing. He studied at the University of Leuven. Ordained a priest in 1906, he devoted himself to teaching, interrupted when he enlisted as a volunteer during the First World War. After the armistice, he continued his teaching career at the religious Bonne Espérance school and at the School of Commerce in Mons. In 1924, by order of Cardinal Désiré-Joseph Mercier, he assumed the leadership of the conservative Catholic newspaper Le Vingtième Siècle.

His ultraconservative ideology was influenced by Charles Maurras and the nationalist Action Française. He was also a great admirer of Mussolini, whom he had visited during a trip to Italy in 1923; he had a signed portrait of the dictator on his office wall. His ideal, as expressed in his book Bélgique et Rhénanie. Quelques directives d'une politique (1923), was the federation of Belgium and the Rhineland, a region of Germany that he considered essentially Catholic, in contrast to Protestant Prussia.

In 1927 the young journalist Georges Remi started working for Le Vingtième Siècle. A year later, Remi became editor-in-chief of Le Petit Vingtième. In 1929, Remi began publishing Tintin in the Land of the Soviets, the first of The Adventures of Tintin, in the eleventh issue of Le Petit Vingtième, under the name Hergé. Wallez was crucial in the choice of the first three destinations of Tintin: Soviet Russia, the Belgian Congo and the United States. They were all motivated by propaganda motifs, to indoctrinate young readers about the benefits of colonialism and the evils of communism. He also facilitated Remi's marriage in 1932 to Germaine Kieckens, who was Wallez's secretary. Hergé's comic series Quick & Flupke also began in Le Vingtième Siècle, in 1930.

In 1933, Wallez was removed from his position as head of Le Vingtième Siècle on the orders of his superiors, and named to head the preservation of the ruins of Aulne Abbey.

With the German invasion of Belgium in 1940, he resumed writing, and supported the Rexist Party led by Léon Degrelle.

In 1947, he was accused of Nazi collaboration, and sentenced to four years in prison and a fine of 200,000 francs. He remained jailed in Charleroi until 1950. After being released, dying of cancer, he was met by Remi and his wife. He died on 24 September 1952 in Saint-Servais, Namur.

== Bibliography ==
- Assouline, Pierre: Hergé. Barcelona, Destiny, 1997. ISBN 84-233-2950-X.
- Lionel Baland, L’Abbé Norbert Wallez. dans Synthèse nationale N°31, Paris, avril 2013.
