= Philippe Goddin =

Belgian literary critic and author (1944–2025)

- Goddin in 2023
- Born: 27 May 1944; Schaerbeek, Brussels region, Belgium
- Died: 8 September 2025 (aged 81); Brussels, Brussels region, Belgium
- Occupations: Author, literary critic
- Known for: Literary critic of The Adventures of Tintin, General secretary of the Fondation Hergé from 1989 to 1999

Philippe Goddin (27 May 1944 – 8 September 2025) was a Belgian author who was a leading expert and literary critic of The Adventures of Tintin, and author of several books on Tintin and his creator, Hergé. He was general secretary of the Fondation Hergé from 1989 to 1999.

== Life and career ==
Goddin was born in Schaerbeek, Belgium, on 27 May 1944. He studied at the Saint-Luc Institute art school in Brussels and became an art teacher.

Goddin wrote numerous books on Hergé, which include Hergé and Tintin, Reporters. He produced a biography, Hergé: lignes de vie.

His masterwork is the seven-volume (totalling 3000 pages) Hergé - Chronologie d'une oeuvre (Hergé - Chronology of his work), which Belgian magazine La Libre called "Magnificent. Monumental. Unique in its kind." ("Magnifique. Monumental. Unique en son genre.")

His study of Tintin was published in English in 3 volumes as The Art of Hergé, Inventor of Tintin; Volume 1 was criticized by Publishers Weekly for being content to retell plots rather than providing critical analysis. It was also published in Dutch as De Kunst van Hergé, schepper van Kuifje; Belgian newspaper De Standaard reviewed volume 2, awarding it 4/5 stars.

He also helped to keep the television series The Adventures of Tintin more true to the books.

Goddin died in Brussels on 8 September 2025, at the age of 81.

== Bibliography ==
- 2005 - Hergé - Chronologie d'une oeuvre Tome 1 - 1907/1931 (CHRONOLOGIE, 1) (French Edition) ASIN 2930284374
- 2003 - Hergé - Chronologie d'une oeuvre Tome 2 - 1931/1935 (CHRONOLOGIE, 2) (French Edition) ASIN 2930284722
- 2003 - Hergé - Chronologie d'une oeuvre Tome 3 - 1935/1939 (CHRONOLOGIE, 3) (French Edition) ASIN 2930284986
- 2012 - Hergé - Chronologie d'une oeuvre Tome 4 - 1939/1943 (CHRONOLOGIE, 4) (French Edition) ASIN 2874240176
- 2012 - Hergé - Chronologie d'une oeuvre Tome 5 - 1943/1949 (CHRONOLOGIE, 5) (French Edition) ASIN 2874240524
- 2009 - Hergé - Chronologie d'une oeuvre Tome 6 - 1950/1957 (CHRONOLOGIE, 6) (French Edition) ISBN 2874241822
- 2011 - Hergé - Chronologie d'une oeuvre Tome 7 - 1958/1983 (CHRONOLOGIE, 7) (French Edition) ISBN 9782874242397
- 2007 - Hergé: lignes de vie ASIN 2874240974
- 2008 - The Art of Hergé, Inventor of Tintin; Volume 1 ISBN 0867197064
- 2010 - The Art of Hergé, Inventor of Tintin; Volume 2 ISBN 0867197242
- 2011 - The Art of Hergé, Inventor of Tintin; Volume 3 ISBN 0867197633
