= Qibao (disambiguation) =

Qibao may refer to:

- Qibao, a town in the Minhang District of Shanghai, China (Chinese: 七宝; pinyin: qībǎo)
- Qibao Station:
  - Qibao Station (Shanghai) (Chinese: 七宝; pinyin: qībǎo)
  - Qibao Station (Hangzhou) (Chinese: 七堡; pinyin: qībǎo)
- Liu Qibao, a Chinese politician (Chinese: 奇葆; pinyin: qíbǎo)

== See also ==
- 七宝 (disambiguation)
