= Tintin and I =

2003 documentary film about Hergé

Tintin et moi Tintin and I
- Film poster for 'Tintin et Moi'
- Directed by: Anders Høgsbro Østergaard
- Written by: Anders Høgsbro Østergaard
- Starring: Hergé
- Release date: 2003
- Running time: 75 minutes
- Languages: French; English; Danish

Tintin and I (French: Tintin et moi, also known as Tintin and Me) is a 2003 documentary by Anders Høgsbro Østergaard, about Belgian writer-artist Georges Remi, better known as Hergé, and his creation Tintin. The film is a co-production of Denmark, Belgium, France, and Switzerland.

The film is based on Numa Sadoul's revealing interviews with Hergé from the 1970s, and goes into detail about Hergé's life and how the success of Tintin affected it. The film is based strongly around Hergé's experiences and state of mental health leading up to the writing of Tintin in Tibet, often heralded as Hergé's most personal album. The history of Tintin is examined through Hergé's life and the way that he was affected by the growing popularity of his character.

== Theme ==
The underlying theme of the film is the way that Hergé's private life affected his work; for example, Bianca Castafiore is a subconscious (or perhaps conscious) reflection of Georges' first wife, Germaine, and the way that Captain Haddock responds to her reflects the way Georges often felt towards his wife. Specifically, the mothering instinct that Germaine had toward him is shown most explicitly in The Castafiore Emerald. The subject of religion is also discussed, including Georges' gradual disillusioned view of the Catholic church, and the opposition he came up against due to Wolff's sacrifice in Explorers on the Moon. The influence of Chang on Georges' work is also highlighted, using reconstructed footage and actual archive footage of their meeting in 1934.

== Format ==
Technically, the film employed a choice of graphic effects to "re-animate" video footage of Hergé speaking, to match up with the audio being played (from the interviews conducted with Sadoul). Panels from the albums were also animated to allow movement through them, the plane crash from Tintin in Tibet and the Shanghai street scene from The Blue Lotus both being used in such a manner. Interviews are reconstructed using actors, but the viewer never sees their faces; hands and arms are used, holding the albums, flicking through them, drinking tea and the like.

== Broadcast ==
The film has been broadcast in the UK on BBC Four and in the US on PBS.

== DVD releases ==
In Australia, Madman Entertainment released a DVD version of Tintin and I in 2007, packaged with I, Tintin, an interview with Gérard Valet, a short film called The Secret of the Clear Line and a menu-based Hergé biography.
