= 七宝 =

七宝 or 七寶, meaning "seven-treasure", may refer to:

- Chilbo (칠보), Korean transliterated title
  - Chilbosan (disambiguation), the name of several mountains in Korea
- Qibao (disambiguation), Chinese transliterated title
  - Qibao, in Shanghai, China
- Shippo (disambiguation), Japanese transliterated title
  - Shippō, Aichi in Japan

== See also ==
- The dictionary definition of 七 at Wiktionary
- The dictionary definition of 宝 at Wiktionary
- The dictionary definition of 寶 at Wiktionary
