= Chilbosan =

Chilbosan (Korean: 칠보산; Hanja: 七寶山), meaning "Seven-treasure mountain", is the name of several mountains in Korea:

- North Korea:
  - Chilbosan (North Hamgyong)
- South Korea:
  - Chilbosan (Gyeonggi)
  - Chilbosan (North Chungcheong)
  - Chilbosan (North Gyeongsang)
  - Chilbosan (North Jeolla)
