= Qibao Old Street =

Area of Qibao, Shanghai, China

Coordinates: 31.1516°N 121.3533°E

- Simplified Chinese: 七宝古镇
- Traditional Chinese: 七寶古镇
- Literal meaning: Seven Treasures Old Town
Transcriptions
Standard Mandarin
- Hanyu Pinyin: Qībǎo Gǔzhèn

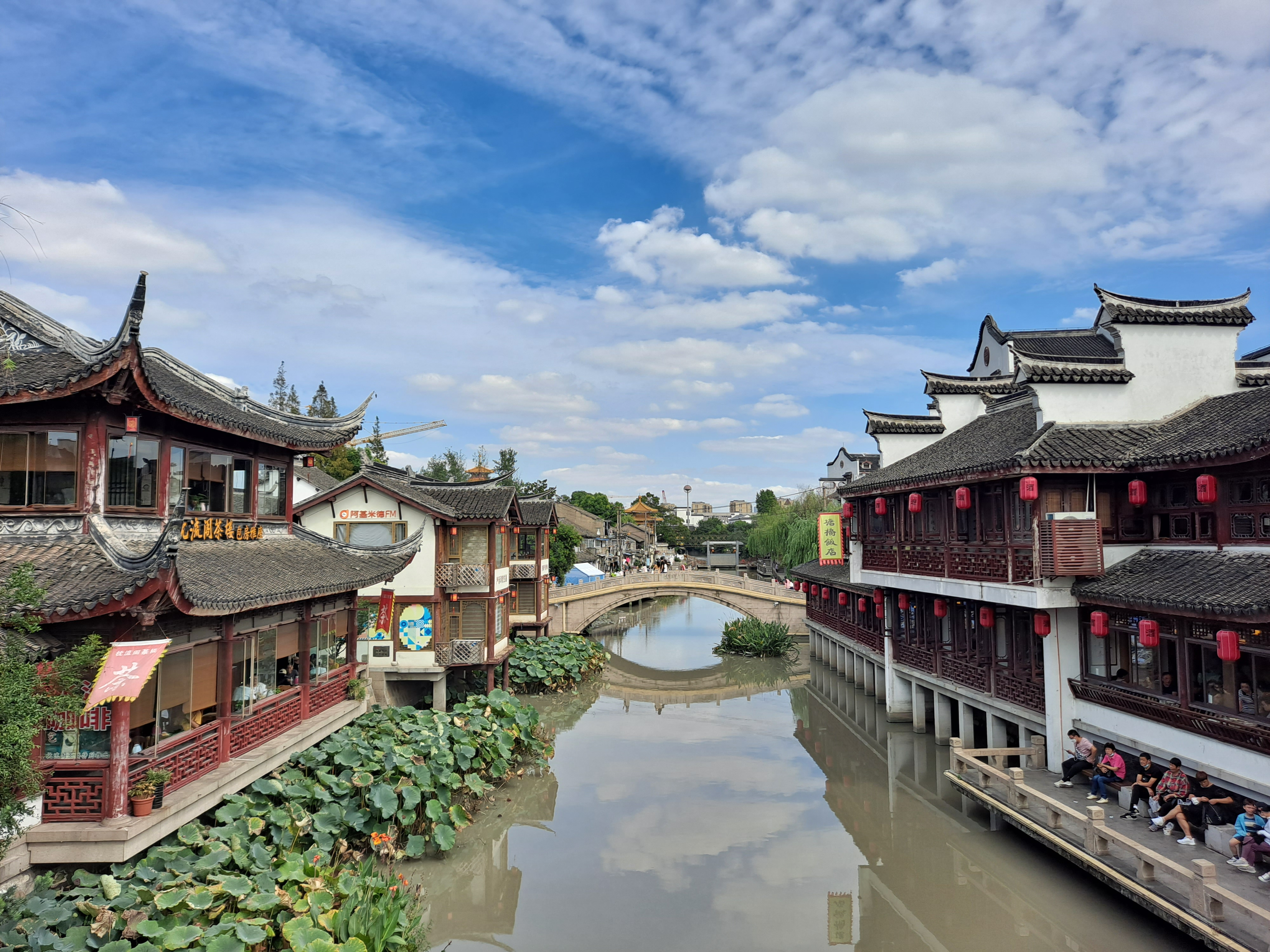
View of the Puhui River, lined with tea houses, running through Qibao Old Street.

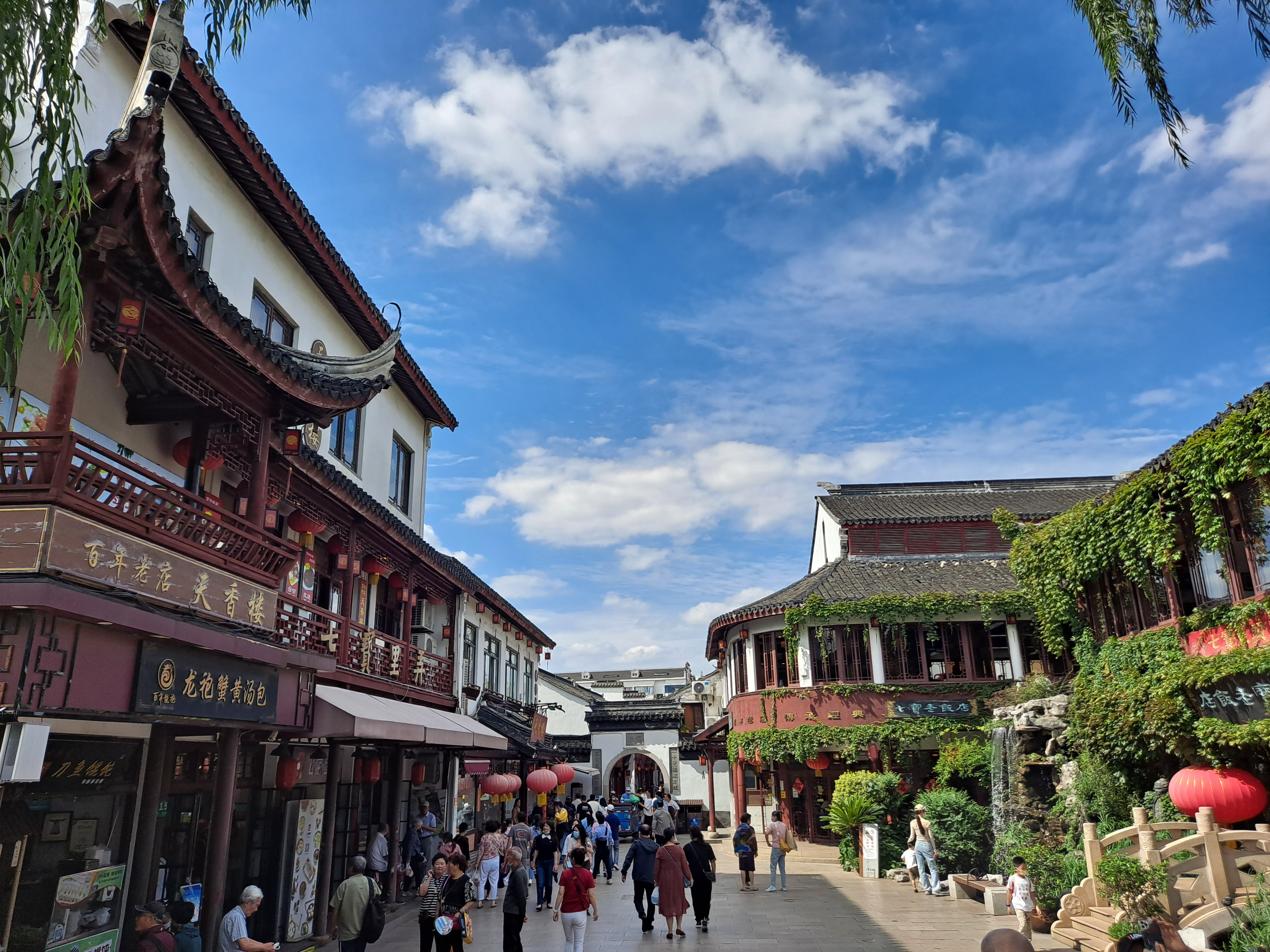
Qibao Old Street

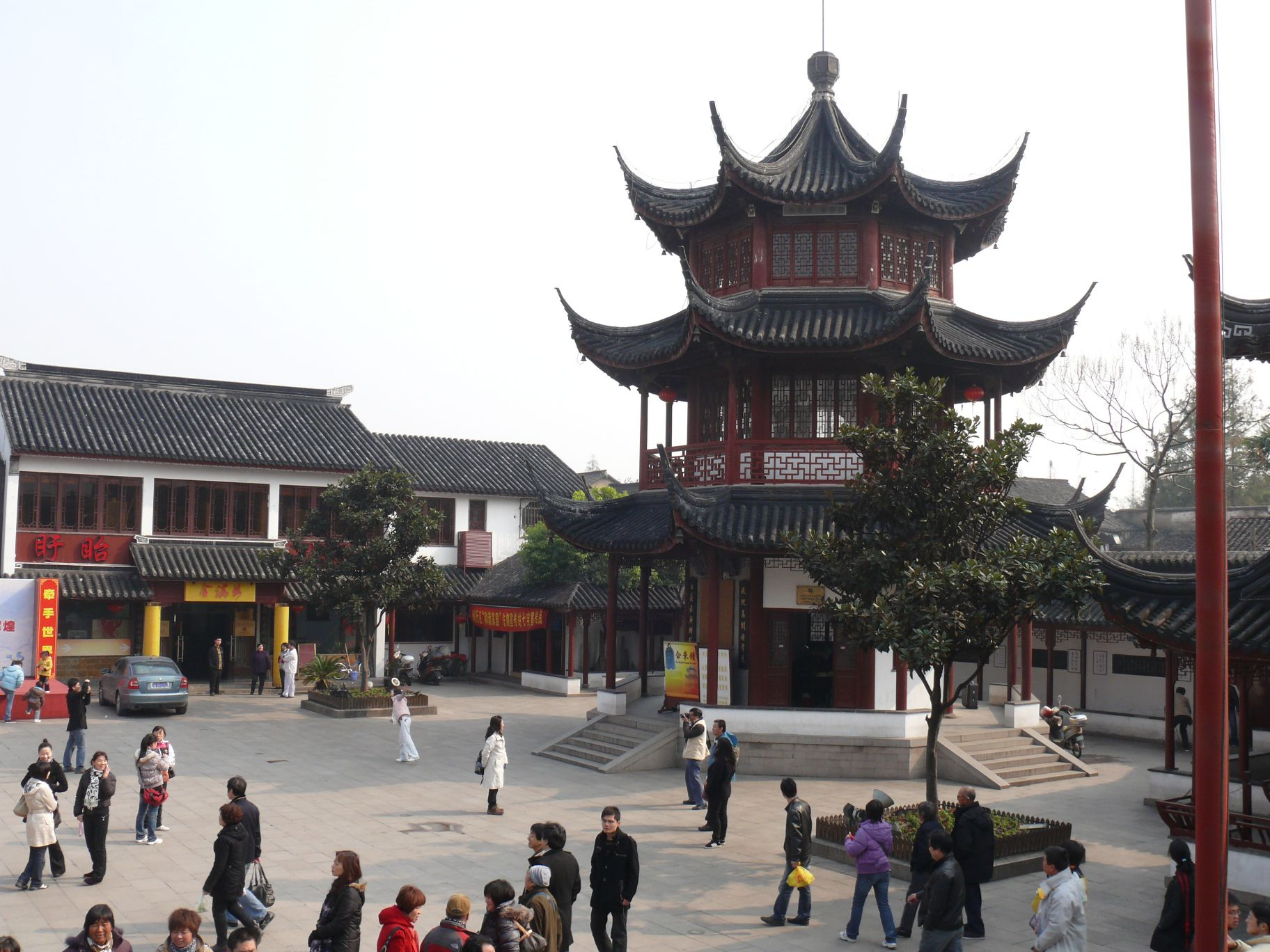
The Bell Tower in Qibao Old Street.

Qibao Old Street is a historic area of Qibao in the Minhang District of Shanghai, China.

== Overview ==
The area is now a tourist attraction, located by the Puhui River with traditional Chinese architecture and a number of attractions, including museums and street food. It is located south of Qingnian Road.

The area was once the residence of the painter and sculptor Zhang Chongren, a friend of the Belgian cartoonist Hergé, on whom the character Chang Chong-Chen from "The Adventures of Tintin" was based. Qibao is also known for crickets (with a "Cricket House") in the Qibao Old Street area. The entire area is pedestrianised.

== Attractions ==
The following attractions are located in Qibao Old Town, many of which can be visited with a combined ticket:

- Bell Tower
- Cotton Textile Mill
- Shadowgraph Museum
- The Old Trades House
- Cricket House
- Zhou's Miniature Museum
- The Pawn Shop
- The Memorial Hall of the Artist Zhang Chongren
- Qibao Calligraphy Arts Room

There are three arched stone footbridges over the Puhui River (from west to east):

- Kangle Bridge
- Puhui River Bridge
- Anping Bridge

Tea houses line the Puhui River and there are boat rides from a wharf. There are many shops selling souvenirs and food, especially street food.

== Transport ==
Qibao Old Town can be accessed by taking Shanghai Metro Line 9 to Qibao Station. The most convenient access is from Exit 2.

== See also ==
- List of restaurant districts and streets
- List of twin towns and sister cities in China
- Qibao
- Qibao station (Shanghai Metro)
