= Caobao Road No. 7 Bridge Blockhouse =

Historic building in Shanghai, China

Coordinates: 31.16°N 121.36°E

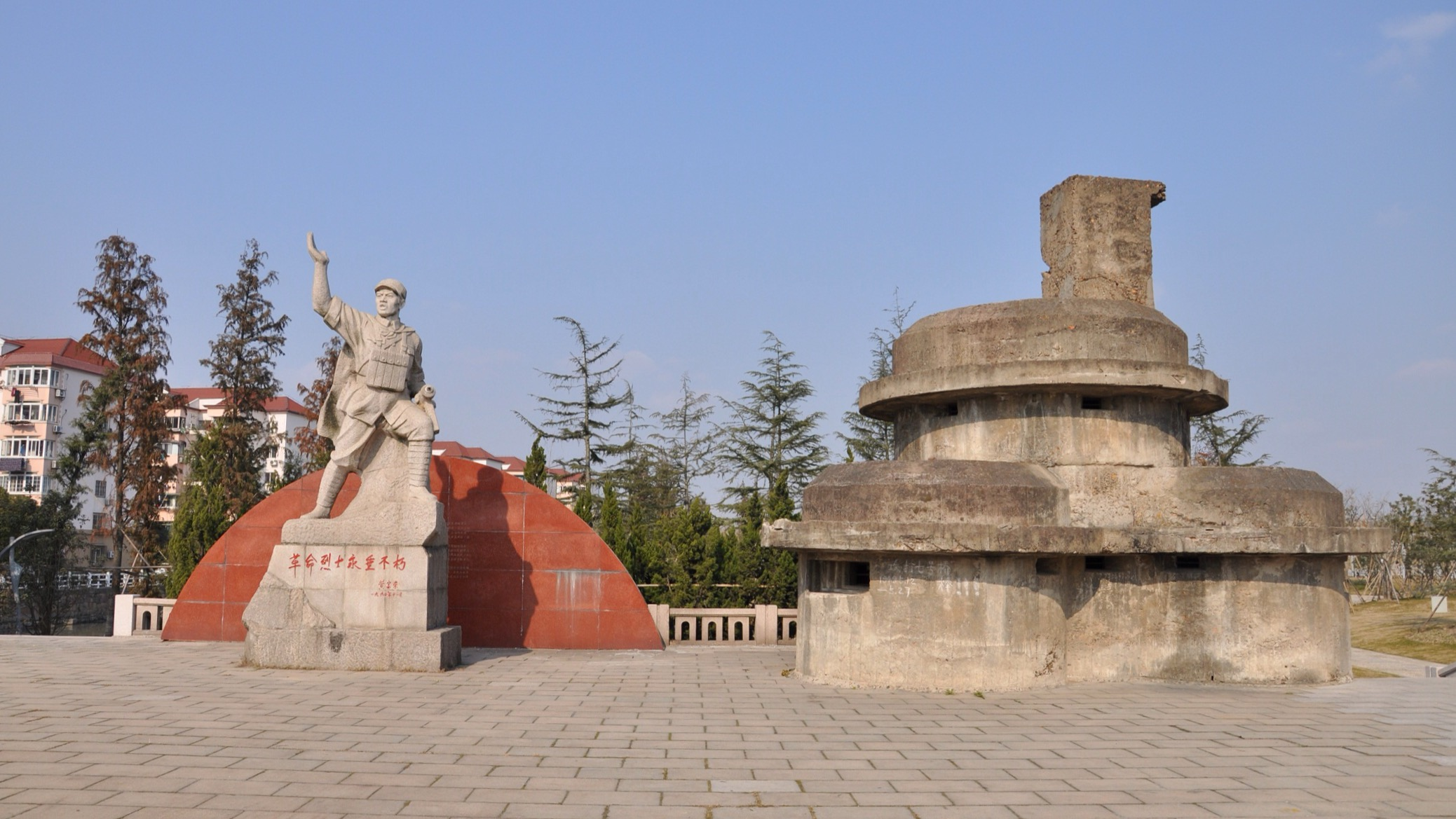
Blockhouse of No.7 Bridge on Caobao Road North side of the east wall of No.7 Bridge on Caobao Road Shanghai Cultural Relics Protection Unit Address：North side of the east gate of No. 7 Bridge, Caobao Road, Qibao Town, Minhang District Category: Important historical sites and representative buildings in modern times Era: Republic of China Number: 8-63 Login: April 4, 2014

The No. 7 Caobao Road Bridge Blockhouse is a historical site located on the north side of the eastern embankment of the No. 7 Caobao Road Bridge (also known as the Puhuitang Bridge) in Qibao Town, Minhang District, Shanghai. The fortress remains are now situated within Minhang Cultural Park and are significant as they are listed as protected cultural relics by both Minhang District and Shanghai Municipal authorities. Additionally, they are designated as a Minhang District Patriotism Education Base.

The People's Government of Qibao Town has erected a monument to honor revolutionary martyrs and a commemorative sculpture to pay tribute to the 37 soldiers of the fourth battalion of the 81st Division of the Third Field Army of the Chinese People's Liberation Army, who lost their lives during the three-day battle to liberate Shanghai. Adjacent to the blockhouse, there stands a statue of a PLA soldier.

Previously, a small building, covering an area of around 100 square meters, was open to the public free of charge within Minhang Cultural Park. This building served as a memorial hall to educate the public about the history of the battle to liberate Shanghai. However, it appears that this building has since been demolished.

== History ==
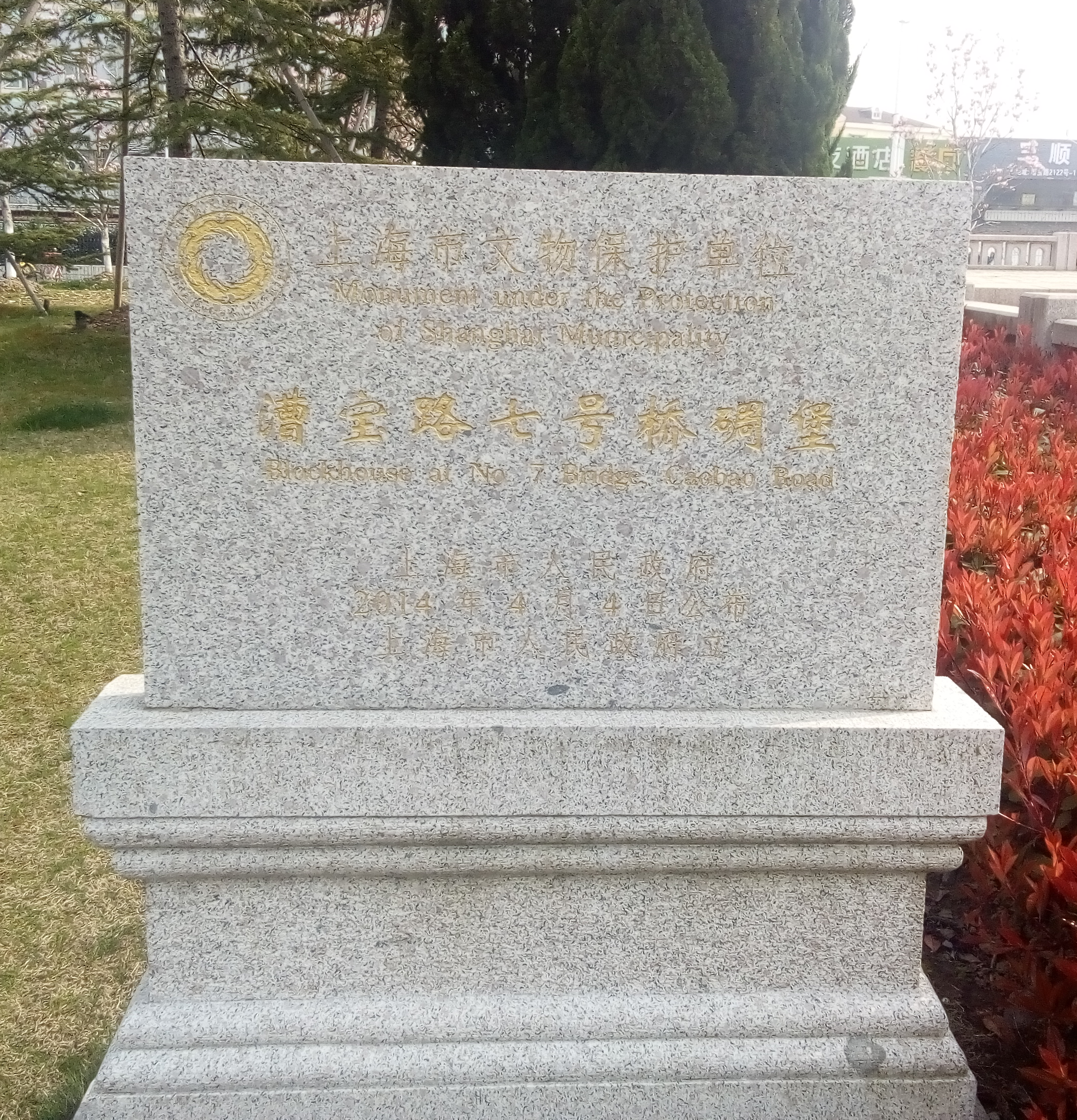
Caobao Road No. 7 Bridge Blockhouse Municipal Cultural Protection Nameplate

In the past, the first section of Caobao Road was an ancient post road, commonly referred to as "Dongguan Road." This road served as a crucial land transportation route from Jiangsu and Zhejiang to Shanghai. During the Second Sino-Japanese War, Qibao found itself on the western side of the Japanese-imposed Qingxiang blockade line. The Japanese army established a checkpoint on the No. 7 bridge of Caobao Road, a significant point along the blockade line. During this time, many essential goods such as grain, cotton, and oil needed in Shanghai were smuggled through Qibao.

Consequently, the Japanese army constructed a two-story brick checkpoint on the south side of the bridge's east end. A small team of Japanese soldiers, puppet forces, interpreters, and even some wolves and dogs were stationed there. Tragically, the loss of many Shanghai citizens at the hands of the Japanese army serves as evidence of the Japanese invasion of China.

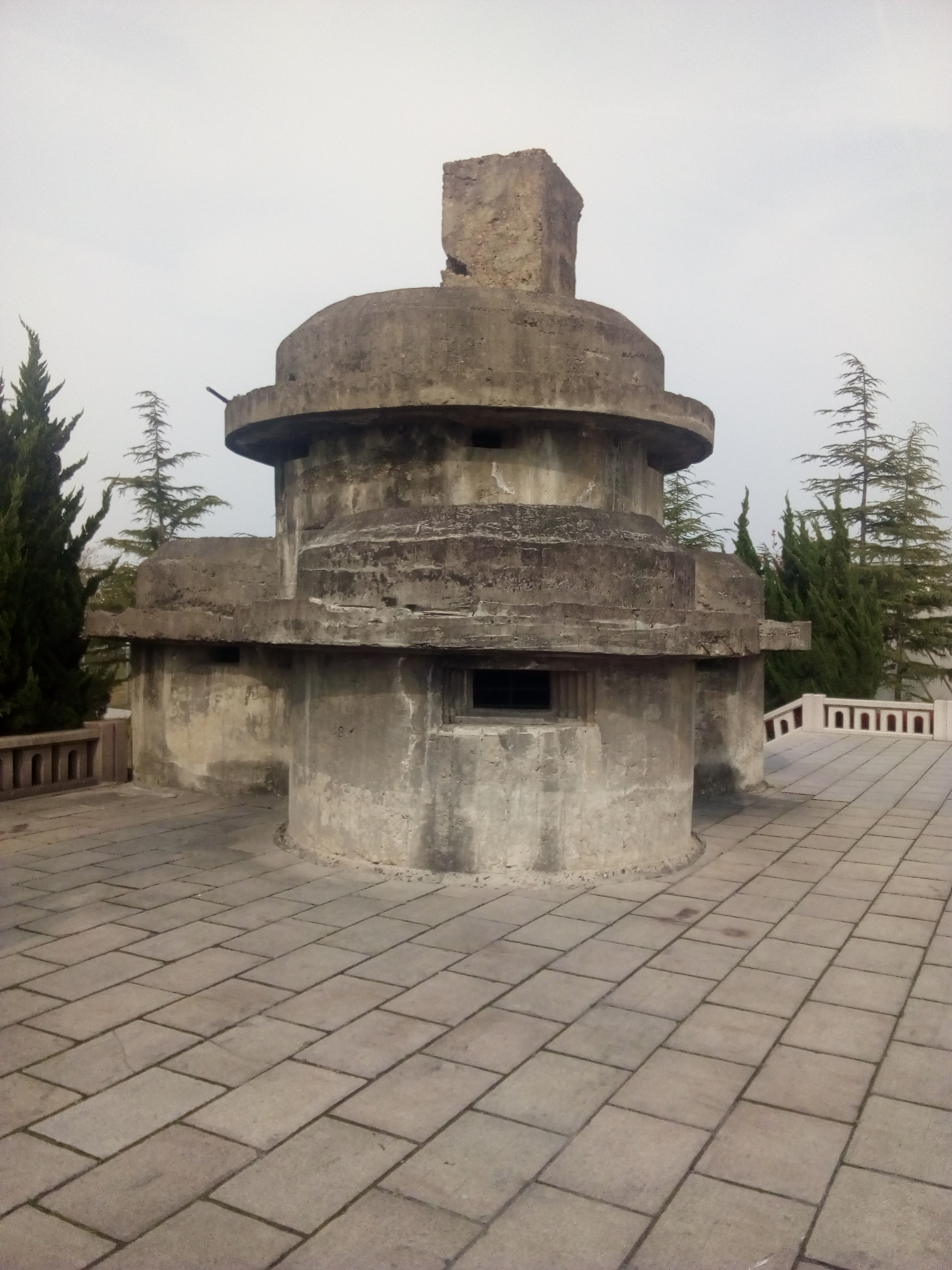
Zibao facing Caobao Road. The bunker consists of three sub-blockhouses, which form a mother-daughter bunker structure.

After World War II, there were conflicts between different forces in Shanghai. In August 1945, Li Yingjie's group from the Shanghai Tax Police Corps, previously connected to Zhou Fohai, took control of the No. 7 Bridge bunker. Later that month, Zhu Yaming's troops, with the help of the Chinese Communist Party's underground organization in Qibao Town, launched a counterattack on the bunker. The battle lasted about three hours, resulting in over 20 casualties, including Li Yingjie, but the bunker remained under the control of the National Revolutionary Army.

In January 1949, Tang Enbo, who was in charge of the Kuomintang's Shanghai garrison, established a defensive system around Shanghai's suburbs. This system consisted of concrete bunkers and stretched from Xinjing Port in Jingting Village, Xinjing Township, along the south bank of Puhuitang to No. 7 Bridge on Caobao Road. In May 1949, the Chinese People's Liberation Army Third Field Army entered Shanghai. The commander of the fourth battalion of the 81st Division of the 27th Army engaged in a fierce three-day battle with the Kuomintang bunker garrison. The People's Liberation Army employed strategic tactics and eventually took control of the bunkers. Many lives were lost, with only 37 soldiers being buried near the former Qingming Festival in 1951. Pan Hannian, then deputy mayor of Shanghai, personally attended the ceremony on Qingming Festival. In 1952, the remains from the north side of the former Qibao Temple were interred in the Shanghai Martyrs' Cemetery.

== Cultural relics protection ==
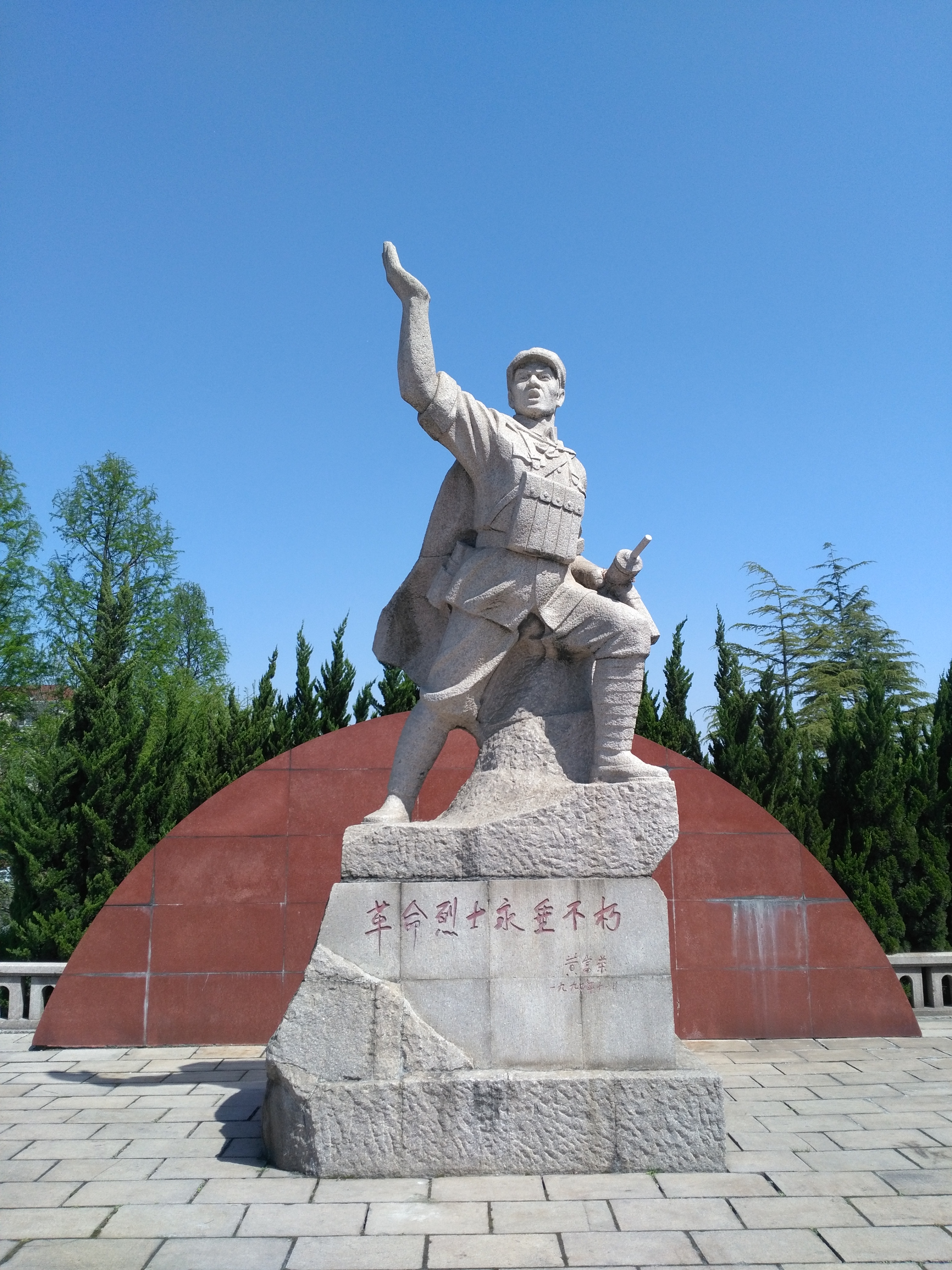
Bridge No. 7 Sculpture

In 1986, this site was designated as a cultural relic protection unit in the original Shanghai County. After the merger of Shanghai County into Minhang District, it was renamed the Minhang District Patriotic Education Base in May 1995.

In January 1996, the memorial site was included in the first group of cultural relics protection units in Minhang District. That same year, the People's Government of Qibao Town invested over 500,000 yuan to construct a 500-square-meter square and commissioned the Shanghai Oil Painting and Sculpture Research Institute to design and create a statue of a PLA warrior. This statue was completed in November of the same year.

On March 23, 2014, the Anti-Japanese War and Liberation War Memorial Site at No. 7 Bridge on Caobao Road was reopened to the public as part of the second phase of the Minhang Cultural Park project. In April 2014, the No. 7 Bridge Bunker was recognized as the eighth group of Shanghai cultural relics protection units.

== Replenish ==
Traditionally, the bridges along Caobao Road were numbered sequentially from east to west, starting with Bridge No. 1 and ending with Bridge No. 8, known as the Hengli Port Bridge. However, Bridge No. 6 is notable because the river it once crossed no longer exists. This bridge is situated 5 meters east of the Hongxin Road intersection.

The original Qibao Temple was located on the southwest side of No. 8 Bridge on Caobao Road. Its current boundaries include Hengli Port to the west, Qixin Road to the east, Qingnian Road to the south, and Caobao Road to the north. Unfortunately, the temple was abandoned during the Taiping Heavenly Kingdom due to the war. The land was subsequently repurposed as the site for the junior high school of Nanyang Model Middle School, which corresponds to the present-day site of Qibao No. 2 Middle School (the original school building) and Qibao Vanke Plaza (the former playground).

The remaining Lianyong Hall is now a cultural relic protection unit in Minhang District, located within Qibao No. 2 Middle School. Originally serving as the office building for Qibao Middle School and Wenlai Middle School, it currently functions as the logistics building for Qibao No. 2 Middle School.

In 2003, a new Qibao Temple was established in Puhuitang, Xinzhen Road. This new temple has no connection to the original Qibao Temple.

== See also ==
- Minhang Cultural Park
