= Porcelain Tower of Nanjing =

Pagoda in China

Coordinates: 32°4′49.26″N 118°43′48.78″E

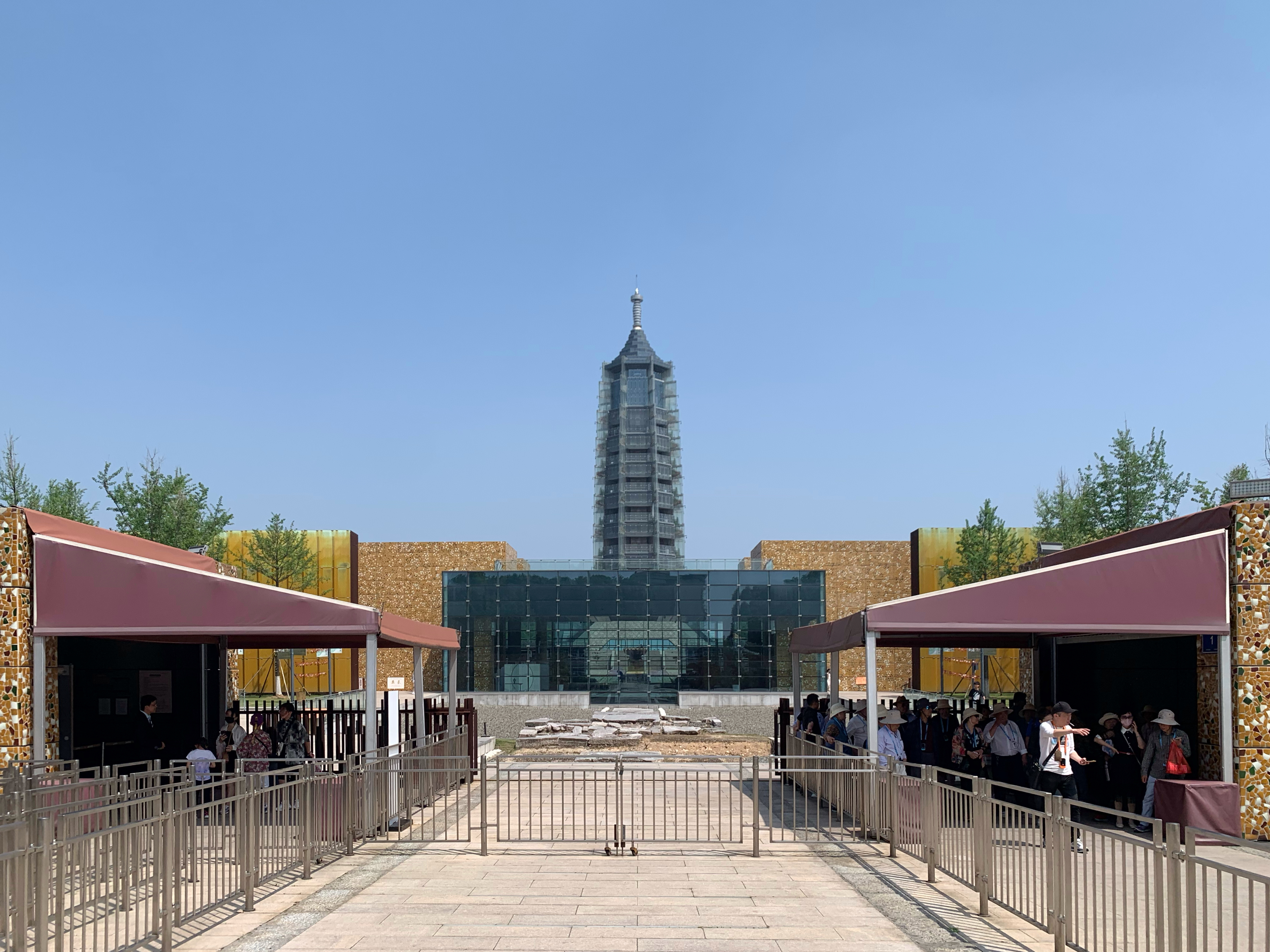
- The reconstructed Porcelain Tower in the background with the ruins of the original preserved in the foreground
- Chinese: 琉璃塔
- Literal meaning: "Veruliyam-Glazed Pagoda"
Transcriptions
Standard Mandarin
- Hanyu Pinyin: Liúlí tǎ
Yue: Cantonese
- Yale Romanization: làuhlèih taap
- Jyutping: lau4lei4 taap3

Great Bao'en Temple
- Traditional Chinese: 大報恩寺
- Simplified Chinese: 大报恩寺
- Literal meaning: "Great Temple of Repaying Kindness"
Transcriptions
Standard Mandarin
- Hanyu Pinyin: Dà Bào'ēn sì
Yue: Cantonese
- Yale Romanization: daaih boyān jih
- Jyutping: daai6 bo3jan1 zi6

The Porcelain Tower of Nanjing, part of the former Great Bao'en Temple, is a historical site located on the south bank of external Qinhuai River in Nanjing, China. The original pagoda was constructed in the 15th century during the Ming dynasty, and it was mostly destroyed in the 19th century during the Taiping Rebellion.

In 2010, Wang Jianlin, a Chinese businessman, donated a billion yuan (US$156 million) to the city of Nanjing for its reconstruction, reported to be the largest single personal donation ever made in China. In December 2015, the modern replica and surrounding park were opened to the public.

== History ==
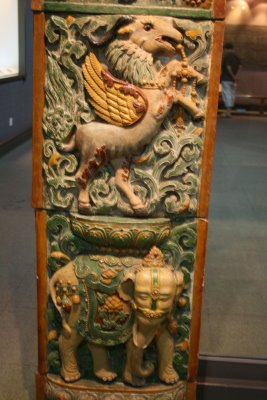
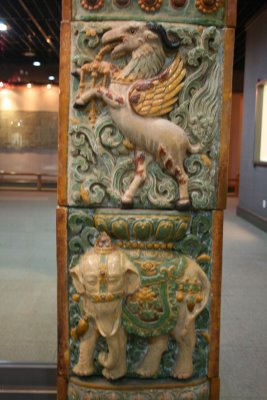
The original blocks of the Nanjing Tower's arched door, now pieced back together and on display at the Nanjing Museum

The Porcelain Tower of Nanjing, originally called the Great Bao'en Temple, was designed during the reign of the Yongle Emperor (r. 1402–1424); its construction began in the early 15th century. On 25 March 1428, the Xuande Emperor ordered Zheng He and others to supervise the rebuilding and repair of the temple. The construction of the temple was completed in 1431.

It was first seen by Europeans such as Johan Nieuhof, and it sometimes was listed as one of the Wonders of the World. After this exposure to the outside world, the tower was seen as a national treasure by both locals and other cultures around the world.

In 1801, the tower was struck by lightning and the top four stories were knocked off, but it was soon restored. The 1843 book The Closing Events of the Campaign in China by Granville Gower Loch contains a detailed description of the tower as it existed in the early 1840s. In the 1850s, the area surrounding the tower erupted in civil war as the Taiping Rebellion reached Nanjing and the rebels took over the city, smashing the Buddhist images and destroying the inner staircase to deny the Qing enemy an observation platform. American sailors reached the city in May 1854 and visited the hollowed tower. In 1856, the Taiping razed the tower to the ground either in order to prevent a hostile faction from using it to observe and shell the city or from superstitious fear of its geomantic properties. After this, the tower's remnants were salvaged for use in other buildings, while the site lay dormant until later rebuilding.

== Description ==
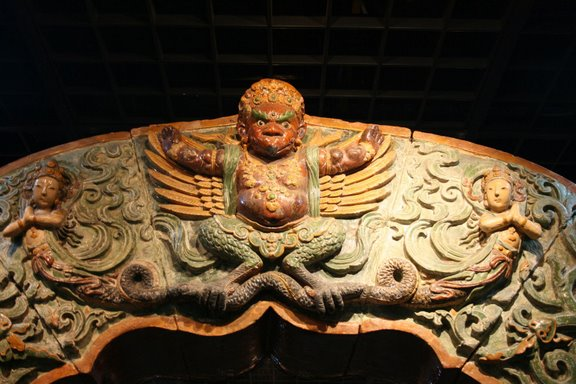
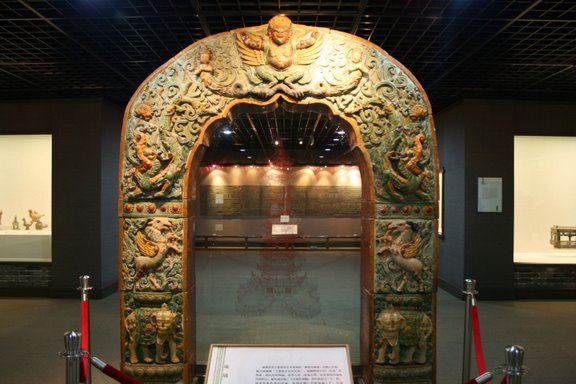
The original blocks of the Nanjing Tower's arched door, now pieced back together and on display at the Nanjing Museum

The original tower was octagonal, with a base of about 30 metres (98 ft) in diameter. When it was built, the tower was one of the largest buildings in China, rising up to a height of 79 metres (259 ft) with nine stories and a staircase in the middle of the pagoda, which spiraled upwards for 184 steps. The top of the roof was marked by a golden pineapple. There were original plans to add more stories, according to an American missionary who in 1852 visited Nanjing. There are only a few Chinese pagodas that surpass its height, such as the still-existent 84-metre-tall (276 ft), eleventh-century Liaodi Pagoda in Hebei or the no-longer-existent 100-metre-tall (330 ft), seventh-century wooden pagoda of Chang'an.

The tower was built with white porcelain bricks that were said to reflect the sun's rays during the day, and at night as many as 140 lamps were hung from the building to illuminate the tower. Glazes and stoneware were worked into the porcelain and created a mixture of green, yellow, brown and white designs on the sides of the tower, including animals, flowers and landscapes. The tower was also decorated with numerous Buddhist images.

Fragments of the original tower may exist in the Calcutta Museum, presented by the Geological Survey of India, 7 August 1877. A small fragment belongs to the Georgia Historical Society in Savannah, Georgia.

== Gallery ==
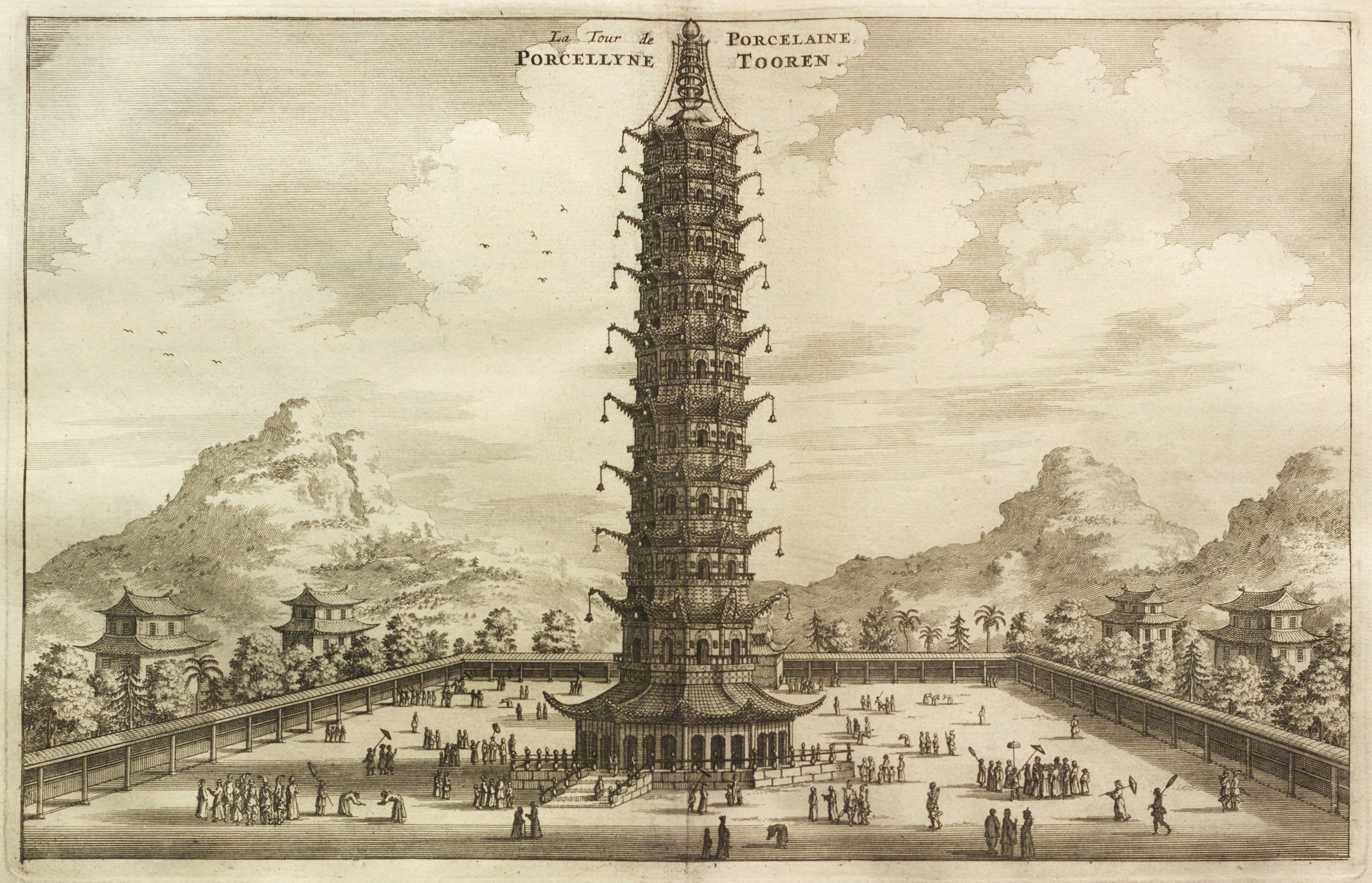
Early European illustration of the Porcelain Tower, from An embassy from the East-India Company (1665) by Johan Nieuhof.

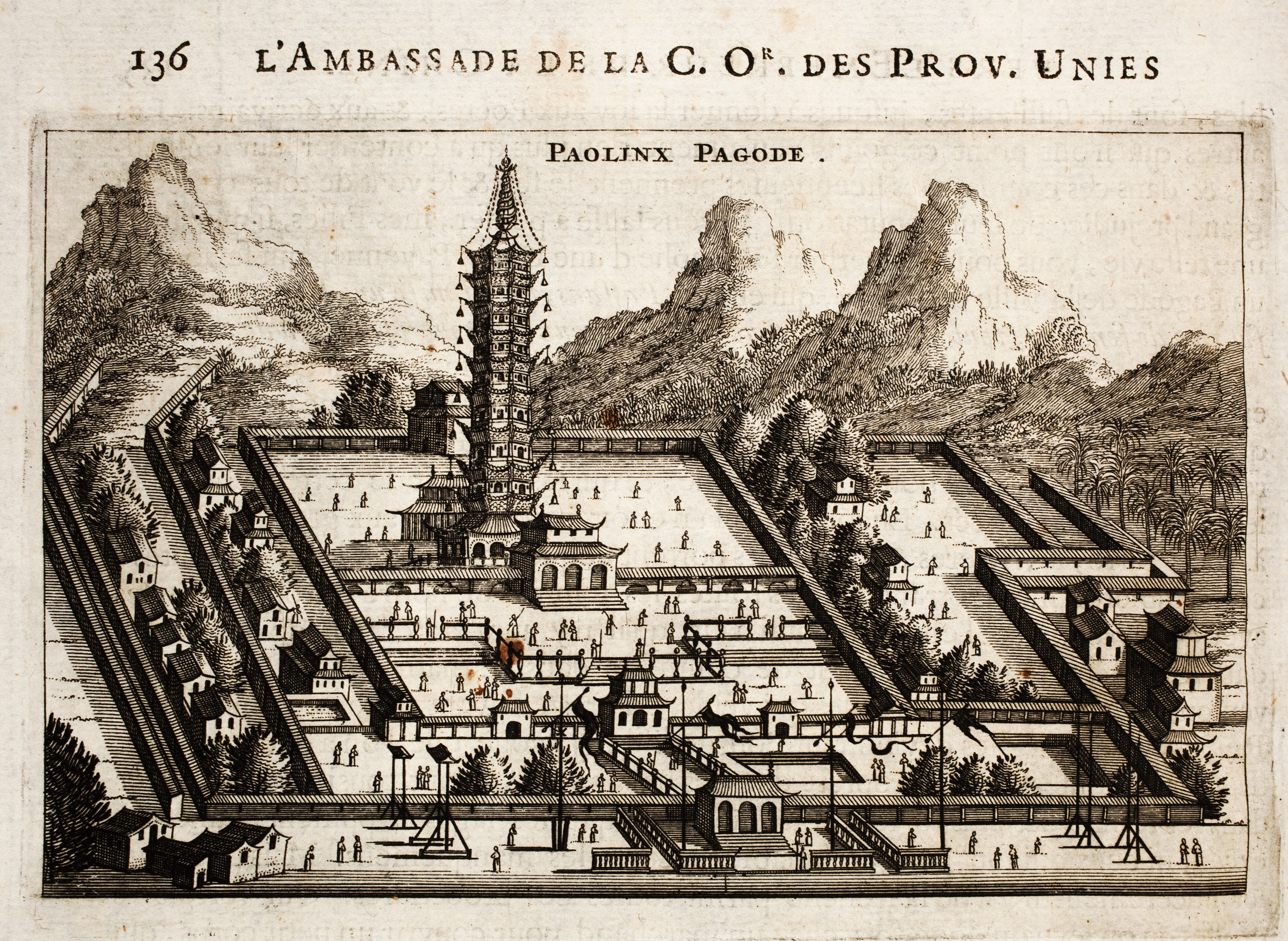
Porcelain Tower, from An embassy from the East-India Company (1665) by Johan Nieuhof.

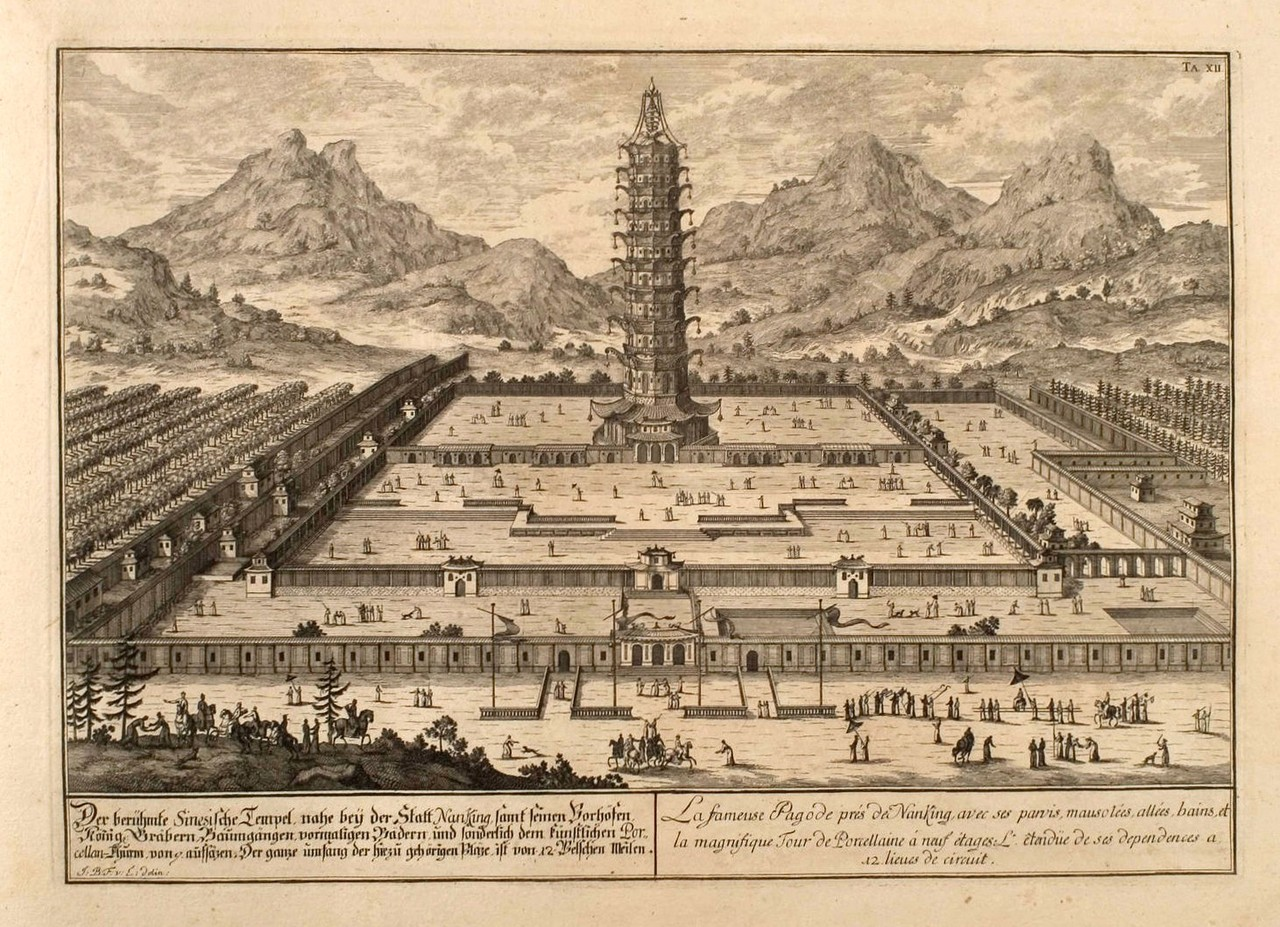
The Porcelain Pagoda, as illustrated in Fischer von Erlach's A Plan of Civil and Historical Architecture (1721).

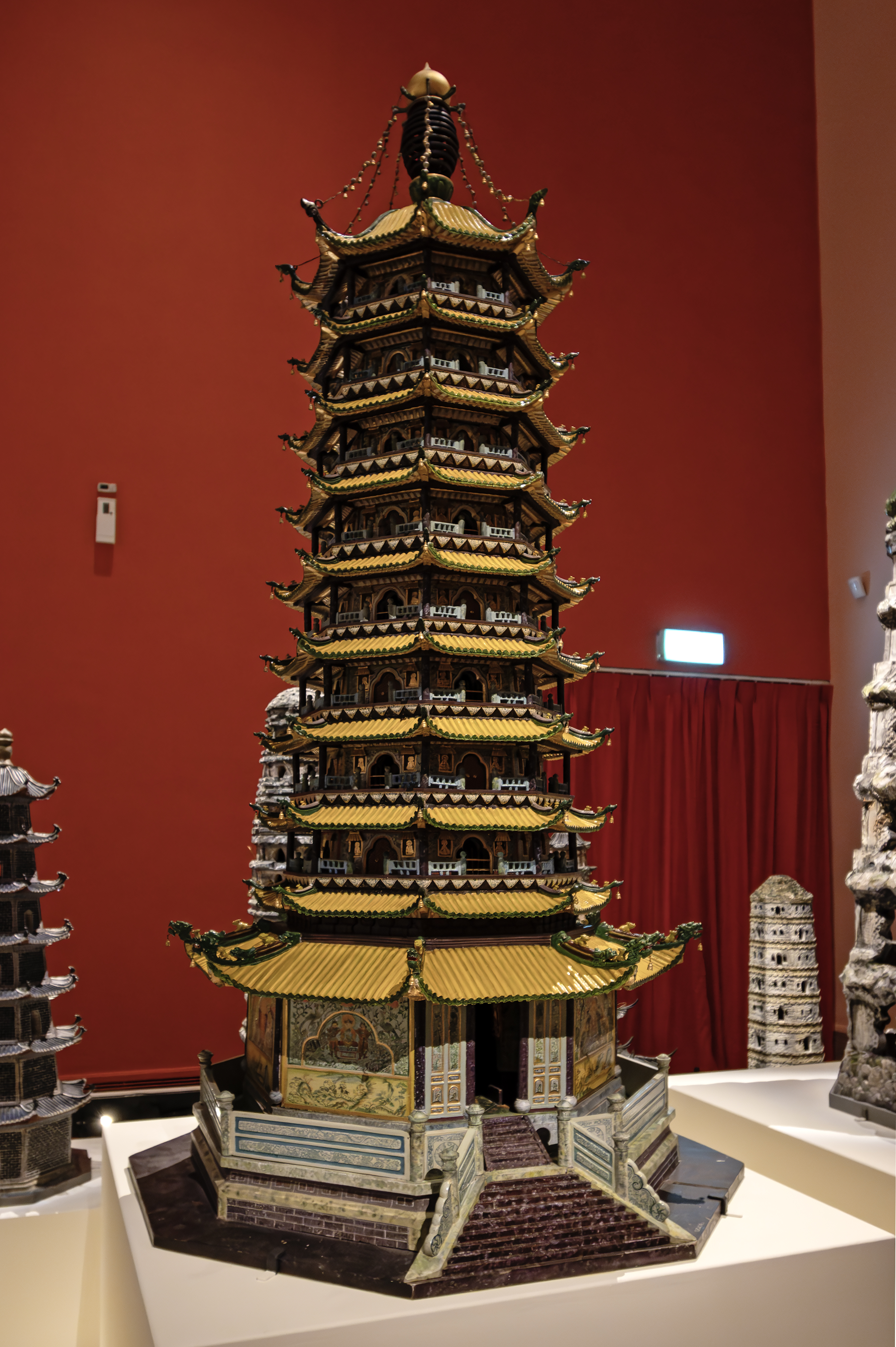
1915 model of the original Porcelain Tower of Nanjing by the Tushanwan Orphanage Workshop.

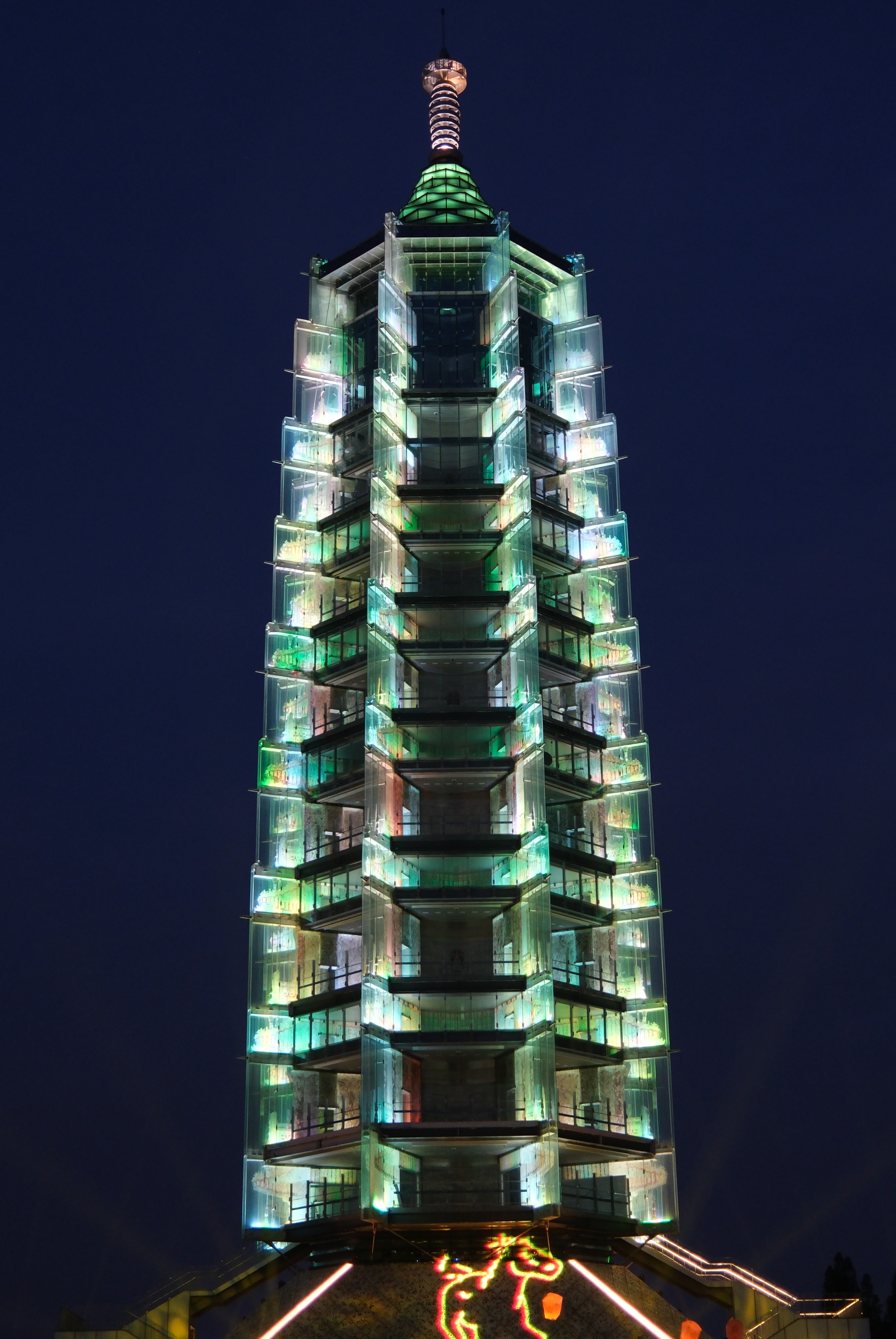
The new Porcelain Tower illuminated at night (2026).
