= I, Tintin =

1976 documentary about the comics series

- French VHS cover
- Directed by: Henri Roanne & Gérard Valet
- Written by: Henri Roanne & Gérard Valet
- Produced by: Belvision - Bruxelles
- Starring: Hergé (Himself), Gérard Valet (Narrator)
- Cinematography: André Goeffers; Walther Vanden Ende
- Music by: Alain Pierre
- Release date: 1976
- Running time: 51 minutes
- Countries: France; Belgium
- Language: French

I, Tintin (French: Moi, Tintin) is a Franco-Belgian film which premiered in the Paris cinema as a feature presentation in 1976. It is made in semidocumentary style and mixing interviews with The Adventures of Tintin creator Hergé with real historical events and news stories edited together with animated Adventures of Tintin clips, narrated by Belgian news correspondent, Gérard Valet. The film was produced by Belvision Studios and Pierre Films in cooperation with the Franco-Belgian Ministry of Culture (Ministère de la Culture Française de Belgique).

== VHS and DVD release ==
A VHS was released in French, and it was released on DVD in 2007 in a double pack with Tintin et Moi, released by Madman Entertainment. It included an interview with Michael Serres, a short film called "The Secret of the Clear Line" and a menu-based Hergé biography.
