= Qibao station =

Qibao station may refer to:

- Qibao station (Shanghai Metro) (Chinese: 七宝; pinyin: qībǎo), a metro station in Shanghai, China
- Qibao railway station (Chinese: 七宝; pinyin: qībǎo), a railway station in Shanghai, China
- Qibao station (Hangzhou Metro) (Chinese: 七堡; pinyin: qībǎo), a metro station in Hangzhou, China
