= Shippo =

Shippo may refer to:

- Shippo (company), American e-commerce software company
- Shippō, Aichi, former Japanese town merged into the city of Ama in 2010
- Shippō Station, Nagoya Railroad Co. station in Ama, Aichi
- Shippo (ikebana), a tool used in ikebana (Japanese flower arrangement), for example in moribana
- Shippo, a character in Inuyasha
- Shippō, a geometric pattern in Japanese sashiko embroidery

== See also ==
- 七宝 (disambiguation)
