= The Blue Lotus =

Comic album by Belgian cartoonist Hergé

The Blue Lotus (Le Lotus bleu)
- Cover of the English edition
- Date: 1936 (black and white); 1946 (colour)
- Series: The Adventures of Tintin
- Publisher: Casterman

Creative team
- Creator: Hergé

Original publication
- Published in: Le Petit Vingtième
- Date of publication: 9 August 1934 – 17 October 1935
- Language: French

Translation
- Publisher: Methuen
- Date: 1983
- Translator: Leslie Lonsdale-Cooper; Michael Turner

Chronology
- Preceded by: Cigars of the Pharaoh (1934)
- Followed by: The Broken Ear (1937)

The Blue Lotus (French: Le Lotus bleu) is the fifth volume of The Adventures of Tintin, the comics series by Belgian cartoonist Hergé. Commissioned by the conservative Belgian newspaper Le Vingtième Siècle for its children's supplement Le Petit Vingtième, it was serialised weekly from August 1934 to October 1935 before being published in a collected volume by Casterman in 1936. Continuing where the plot of the previous story, Cigars of the Pharaoh, left off, the story tells of young Belgian reporter Tintin and his dog Snowy, who are invited to China in the middle of the 1931 Japanese invasion, where Tintin reveals the machinations of Japanese spies and uncovers a drug-smuggling ring.

In creating The Blue Lotus, Hergé exhibited a newfound emphasis on accuracy and documentation in his portrayal of foreign societies. He was heavily influenced by his close friend Zhang Chongren, a Chinese student studying in Belgium, and the work both satirises common European misconceptions about China as well as criticising the actions of the Japanese invaders. The Blue Lotus was a commercial success in Belgium and was soon serialised in France and Switzerland, while news of the book led the Chinese political leader Chiang Kai-shek to invite Hergé to visit China. Hergé continued The Adventures of Tintin with The Broken Ear, while the series itself became a defining part of the Franco-Belgian comics tradition. In 1946, The Blue Lotus was partially re-drawn and coloured by the cartoonist and his team of assistants; during this process a number of minor plot elements were changed. The adventure introduces the recurring characters J.M. Dawson and Chang Chong-Chen. The story was adapted for a 1991 episode of the Ellipse/Nelvana animated series The Adventures of Tintin. Critical analysis of the story has been positive, with various commentators considering it to be one of Hergé's finest works.

== Synopsis ==
The synopsis continues a plot begun in Cigars of the Pharaoh.

Staying at the palace of the Maharaja of Gaipajama in India, Tintin is approached by a visitor from Shanghai in China. The visitor supplies him with the name of Mitsuhirato, a Japanese businessman based in Shanghai while on secondment, but before finishing his message is hit by a dart dipped in Rajaijah, the "poison of madness". Tintin and his Fox Terrier Snowy travel to Shanghai to meet Mitsuhirato, who warns them that the Maharajah is in danger and that they should return to India. Surviving several attempts on his life by mysterious assailants, Tintin attempts to leave for India by boat, but is kidnapped and brought back to China. His abductors reveal themselves as members of a secret society known as the Sons of the Dragon, who, like the Maharaja, are devoted to combating the opium trade. Their leader, Wang Chen-Yee, explains to Tintin that Mitsuhirato is both a Japanese spy and an opium smuggler, and enlists Tintin in their fight to stop him. Tintin agrees, and spies on Mitsuhirato at the Blue Lotus opium den. Following him, Tintin witnesses Mitsuhirato blowing up a Chinese railway. The Japanese government frames it as an attack from Chinese bandits, and uses it as an excuse to invade Northern China, taking Shanghai under its control.

Tintin is captured by Mitsuhirato, who plans to poison him with Rajaijah. However, one of Wang's agents swaps out the poison for coloured water, so when Tintin is "poisoned", he is able to feign madness long enough to be untied and let go so he is able to escape from Mitsuhirato. Mitsuhirato later discovers the deception and convinces the Japanese military forces to put a warrant out for Tintin's arrest. Meanwhile, Tintin enters the Shanghai International Settlement in search for Professor Fang Hsi-ying, an expert on poisons who he hopes can develop a cure for Rajaijah, but discovers that he has been kidnapped. J.M. Dawson, the Settlement's corrupt Chief of Police, arrests Tintin and hands him over to the Japanese, who sentence him to death before he is rescued by Wang.

Travelling to Hukow to search for Fang, Tintin comes across a flood that has caused extensive damage, and rescues a young Chinese orphan Chang Chong-Chen from drowning. Chang accompanies Tintin to Hukow, where one of Mitsuhirato's spies tries to kill Tintin but fails; they realise that it was a trap and that Fang was not there. Meanwhile, the detectives Thomson and Thompson are employed by Dawson to arrest Tintin, but fail on multiple occasions. Returning to Shanghai, Tintin intends to confront Mitsuhirato, and allows himself to be captured by him. Being held prisoner at The Blue Lotus, he discovers that Mitsuhirato is in league with the film director Rastapopoulos, who reveals that he is the leader of the international opium smuggling gang that Tintin has been pursuing in Egypt, Arabia, India, and now China. Rastapopoulos was also the man assumed to have fallen to his death during the foiled kidnapping of the Maharaja's son. However, in accordance with Tintin's plan, Chang and the Sons of the Dragon rescue Tintin and Fang; Rastapopoulos is arrested while Mitsuhirato commits seppuku. Tintin's report on Mitsuhirato's activities leads to accusations against Japan, which withdraws from the League of Nations in protest. Fang develops a cure for Rajaijah, while Wang adopts Chang as his son. Tintin and Snowy return home to Europe.

== History ==
=== Background ===
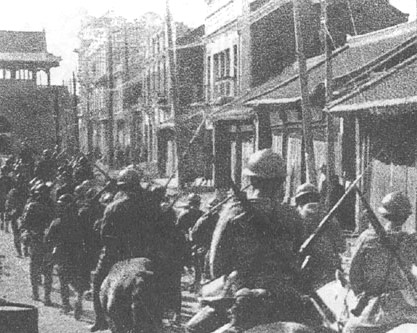
Japanese soldiers enter Shenyang during the Mukden Incident in 1931, one of the events of the contemporary Sino-Japanese War depicted in The Blue Lotus.

Georges Remi—best known under the pen name Hergé—was employed as editor and illustrator of Le Petit Vingtième ("The Little Twentieth"), a children's supplement to Le Vingtième Siècle ("The Twentieth Century"), a staunchly Roman Catholic, conservative Belgian newspaper based in Hergé's native Brussels which was run by the Abbé Norbert Wallez. In 1929, Hergé began The Adventures of Tintin comic strip for Le Petit Vingtième, about the exploits of fictional young Belgian reporter Tintin. Wallez ordered Hergé to set his first adventure in the Soviet Union to act as anti-socialist propaganda for children (Tintin in the Land of the Soviets), to set his second adventure in the Belgian Congo to encourage colonial sentiment (Tintin in the Congo), and to set his third adventure in the United States to use the story as a denunciation of American capitalism (Tintin in America). On 24 November 1932, Le Petit Vingtième published a fictional interview with Tintin in which the reporter announced that he would travel to China via Egypt, India, Sri Lanka, and Indochina. This plotline resulted in Tintin in the Orient, the first part of which was an Adventure set in Egypt, Arabia, and India that Hergé later titled Cigars of the Pharaoh. Cigars ceased publication in Le Petit Vingtième in February 1934, and Hergé next provided the standalone story Popol out West for the newspaper. The Blue Lotus was the second half of the Tintin in the Orient story that Hergé had begun with Cigars of the Pharaoh.

However, Hergé knew as little about China as he did about the Soviet Union or the Belgian Congo. At the time most Belgians held to a negative stereotype of China, viewing it as "a distant continent of a nation, barbaric, overpopulated, and inscrutable", and Hergé had long believed this view. He had included Chinese characters in two previous Adventures, in both instances depicting them according to traditional European clichés. In Tintin in the Land of the Soviets, he included two pigtailed Chinese men hired by the Bolsheviks to torture Tintin, while in Tintin in America he featured two Chinese hoodlums who plotted to eat Snowy. Hergé learned a bit about the country from Albert Londres' book China Madness, based on Londres' experiences in the country. He was also influenced in his portrayal of China by the 1933 German film Flüchtlinge (At the End of the World).

"It was at the time of The Blue Lotus that I discovered a new world. For me up to then, China was peopled by a vague, slit-eyed people who were very cruel, who would eat swallows' nests, wear pig-tails and throw children into rivers... I was influenced by the pictures and stories of the Boxer Uprising, where the accent was always on the cruelty of the yellow people, and this made a deep impact".

— Hergé, talking to Numa Sadoul.

Learning of Hergé's intention to set the next Adventure in China, Abbot Léon Gosset, a Roman Catholic chaplain to the Chinese students at the Catholic University of Leuven, contacted Hergé and asked him to be cautious in his depiction of the country. His students read Le Petit Vingtième and he thought it would be counterproductive if Hergé continued to propagate negative stereotypes about the Chinese people. Hergé was sensitive to Gosset's ideas, and Gosset proceeded to put him in touch with two of his Chinese students, Arnold Chiao Ch'eng-Chih and his wife Susan Lin. He also gave him the address of a Chinese student a year Hergé's junior, Zhang Chongren. The pair first met on 1 May 1934, soon becoming close friends and spending every Sunday afternoon with each other for over a year. Zhang later commented that he and Hergé became akin to "two brothers". A student of painting and sculpture at Brussels' Royal Museums of Fine Arts, Zhang taught Hergé about Chinese artistic styles, giving him a set of traditional Chinese brushes and explaining to him the art of painting a tree and Chinese calligraphy, alongside explaining the tenets of Taoist philosophy. Both his artistic and philosophical training under Zhang would have a profound effect on Hergé.

Hergé had also established contact with Father Édouard Neut, hosteller at the St. Andrew's Abbey near Bruges. Neut had a special interest in China, and was excited by Hergé's latest venture, commenting that it could contribute to "a work of inter-racial understanding and true friendship between Orientals and whites". He sent him two books, Father Thadée's Aux origines du conflict mandchou (On the Origins of the Manchu Conflict) and Zheng Zheng's Ma Mère (My Mother), a first-hand account of Chinese family life. He also sent Hergé a 1932 article discussing the differences between Chinese and Japanese cultures. At the time, Neut was working as the assistant of Lu Zhengxiang, a former prime minister of China who had become a monk at St. Andrew's Abbey. Mainstream Western press was broadly sympathetic to the Japanese cause, viewing them as a bulwark against the Soviet Union, a view that Hergé was to eschew.

=== Original publication, 1934–35 ===
The comic strip began serialisation in Le Petit Vingtième on 9 August 1934 as Les Aventures De Tintin Reporter En Extrême-Orient (The Adventures of Tintin, Reporter in the Far East). It began serialisation in France in Cœurs Vaillants from 29 December 1935, and later in the Swiss magazine L'Écho Illustré. Alongside protagonists Tintin and Snowy, Hergé also included the detectives Thomson and Thompson in the story, who had been introduced in the previous story. He also alluded to the movie that Tintin and Snowy had interrupted the filming of in Cigars, Rastapopoulos' The Sheik's House, by having the characters watch the film during a cinema screening.

The Blue Lotus on the front cover of an edition of Le Petit Vingtième.

Hergé actively satirised typical European opinions of China in The Blue Lotus. He had Thomson and Thompson dress in what they perceived as traditional Chinese costume, as Mandarins, only to stand out in stark contrast to the actual clothing worn in China. He also had Gibbons, one of the story's antagonists, express racist attitudes toward the Chinese, and made Tintin give a speech to Chang explaining western misunderstandings of the Chinese. He took "a radical view" by expressing a criticism of Western activity in China's International Settlement, depicting it as extremely corrupt and only interested in its own commercial interests. He gained much of his information on such issues from Zhang, who informed him of the political events occurring in China from a Chinese perspective. Building on this information, Hergé's depiction of the Japanese invasion was largely accurate, although it served as an outright attack on Japanese imperialism. Hergé depicted fictionalised versions of both the real-life Mukden Incident, although he shifted its location nearer to Shanghai, and Japan's walking out of the League of Nations.

Further devoting himself to greater accuracy, Hergé also made increasing use of photographs to draw from, such as of Chinese clothing, street scenes, and landscape. Hergé's newfound emphasis on accuracy and documentation imbued the rest of the Adventures. While Hergé relied on nonsensical Arabic for the backgrounds in Cigars, for The Blue Lotus Zhang drew many of the ideograms that appeared as street signs and advertisements throughout the story. (The accuracy of the characters varies considerably.) Among these ideograms were those of a political nature, proclaiming slogans such as "Down with Imperialism", "Abolish unfair treaties", and "Down with Japanese merchandise". Zhang also sketched out a number of images for Hergé, such as the outline of Wang's house. Zhang's signature was also included twice throughout the comic, reflecting his artistic contribution; Hergé wanted to include Zhang's name as co-author before Zhang declined, which did not happen previously and subsequently in the other books. In gratitude, Hergé created the character of Chang in honour of his friend Zhang.

Upon realising the anti-Japanese tone of the story, Japan's diplomats stationed in Belgium issued an official complaint, conveyed to Hergé by Lieutenant-General Raoul Pontus, president of the Sino-Belgian Friendship Association. The diplomats threatened to take their complaint to the Permanent Court of International Justice at The Hague. In learning of this, Zhang congratulated Hergé, stating that it would only further expose the actions of Japan in China to further international scrutiny and would make Hergé "world-famous". Hergé's strip also came under criticism from a Belgian general, who commented: "This is not a story for children ... It's just a problem for Asia!" The story was nevertheless a commercial success, and Le Petit Vingtième organised a celebration to commemorate the return of Tintin from the Far East, sponsored by the L'Innovation and Bon Marché department stores. Taking place at the Cirque Royal, it was attended by 3000 fans of the series, many of whom were Scouts, and involved an actor portraying Tintin who accompanied Hergé, the newspaper's staff, a contortionist and a clown.

In September 1935, Zhang returned to China at his family's request. Hergé meanwhile set about preparing the strip for publication in book form through Casterman. Proud of this Adventure, he encouraged them to increase the level of marketing and advertising for the work. At their advice, he renamed the story from The Adventures of Tintin in the Far East to The Blue Lotus, commenting of this new title: "It is short, it sounds Chinese and it is mysterious". At Casterman's prompting, he also inserted four coloured plates throughout the work, and devised a new design for the front cover. The book was finally published in October 1936. Hergé was pleased with the product, commenting: "I was just bowled over! It is the height of luxury and my first thought was 'It's much too good for children!' ... I was far from expecting that". He sent a copy to Zhang, who replied to thank him. After news of its publication reached China, in 1939 political leader Chiang Kai-shek, who had enjoyed The Blue Lotus, asked his wife Soong Mei-ling to invite Hergé to visit them there, although he was unable to do so due to the impending Second World War. He finally took up her offer in 1973, visiting her on the island of Taiwan.

=== Second version, 1946 ===
In the 1940s and 1950s, when Hergé's popularity had increased, he and his team at Studios Hergé redrew many of the original black-and-white Tintin adventures in colour using the ligne claire ("clear line") (Note: Hergé himself did not use the term ligne claire to describe his drawing style. Cartoonist Joost Swarte first used the term in 1977.) drawing style he had developed so that they visually fitted in with the new Tintin stories being created. The Studios reformatted and coloured The Blue Lotus in 1946. Apart from the first four pages, which were completely remade, little was actually changed for the 1946 edition, although many of the backgrounds were embellished. Minor alterations included replacing the trio of highland Scotsmen who briefly appeared as Dawson's henchmen with three Sikhs. The map that appears on the opening page was made smaller, while a reference to Sir Malcolm Campbell was removed. The European Palace Hotel was renamed The Continental, while Gibbons' company was also renamed from the Americano-Anglo Chinese Stell [sic] Company Limited to American and Chinese Steel Incorporated, and the drug smuggling ship known as the S.S. City of Doodlecastle was renamed the S.S. Harika Maru.

=== Later publications ===
Both Rastapopoulos and Dawson reappeared in the series 20 years later in The Red Sea Sharks. Casterman republished the original black-and-white version in 1979 in a French-language collected volume with Cigars of the Pharaoh and The Broken Ear, the second part of the Archives Hergé collection. In 1985, Casterman published a facsimile version of the original. Meanwhile, Methuen, the British publisher of The Adventures of Tintin, felt that the story was dated, and only published The Blue Lotus in 1983, the year of Hergé's death. The translation into English was undertaken by Michael Turner and Leslie Lonsdale-Cooper, although it lost the English accent of the British troops which was conveyed in the original French. The Adventures of Tintin also became popular in Japan, something Michael Farr thought indicated that the Japanese had not taken offence to Hergé's portrayal of them in The Blue Lotus. After Hergé's death, the original illustrated manuscript of The Blue Lotus was discovered at Studio Hergé, and was subsequently exhibited as the centrepiece of an exhibit commemorating the 60th anniversary of The Adventures of Tintin.

==== Auction of draft cover ====
The first draft of the cover to The Blue Lotus was given by Hergé in 1936 to Jean-Paul Casterman, the son of Louis Casterman, Hergé's editor. Jean-Paul Casterman folded the drawing and put in a drawer. It stayed in the drawer until 1981, when Jean-Paul Casterman retrieved it and asked Hergé to sign it. It was auctioned on January 14, 2021, and proceeds were "more than three million euros".

== Critical analysis ==
The Blue Lotus is widely regarded as one of the best Tintin adventures. Jean-Marc and Randy Lofficier commented that The Blue Lotus was "unarguably Hergé's first masterpiece". They felt that for the first time in the series, "one senses that the story has become important" as Tintin first expresses "a purpose, a mission" to his adventure. Commenting on the character Chang, they thought that he was an "endearing personality" despite having little relevance to the plot, also believing that Dawson and Gibbons were the most loathsome characters in the Adventure. They compared the scene in which the Japanese invaded China with that in Tintin in America where the U.S. army force Native Americans off their land, and praised the linear illustrations of the story, although also opined that the original black-and-white version was better than its colour counterpart. Overall, they awarded The Blue Lotus four stars out of five.

Harry Thompson noted that some people believed that Hergé's depiction of the Japanese as buck-toothed and inherently violent in The Blue Lotus was racist. He nevertheless thought that these accusations "stupidly" missed "the point of the story", which was to counter widespread racist attitudes toward East Asians among Belgians. Due to the inclusion of actual historical events, he thought that the comic lacked the "timelessness" of other Adventures but that for 1934 it was "a marvelous piece of comic strip art". Hergé biographer Pierre Assouline thought that the book combined "social realism" with the spirit present in the work of Charles Dickens and Alexandre Dumas.

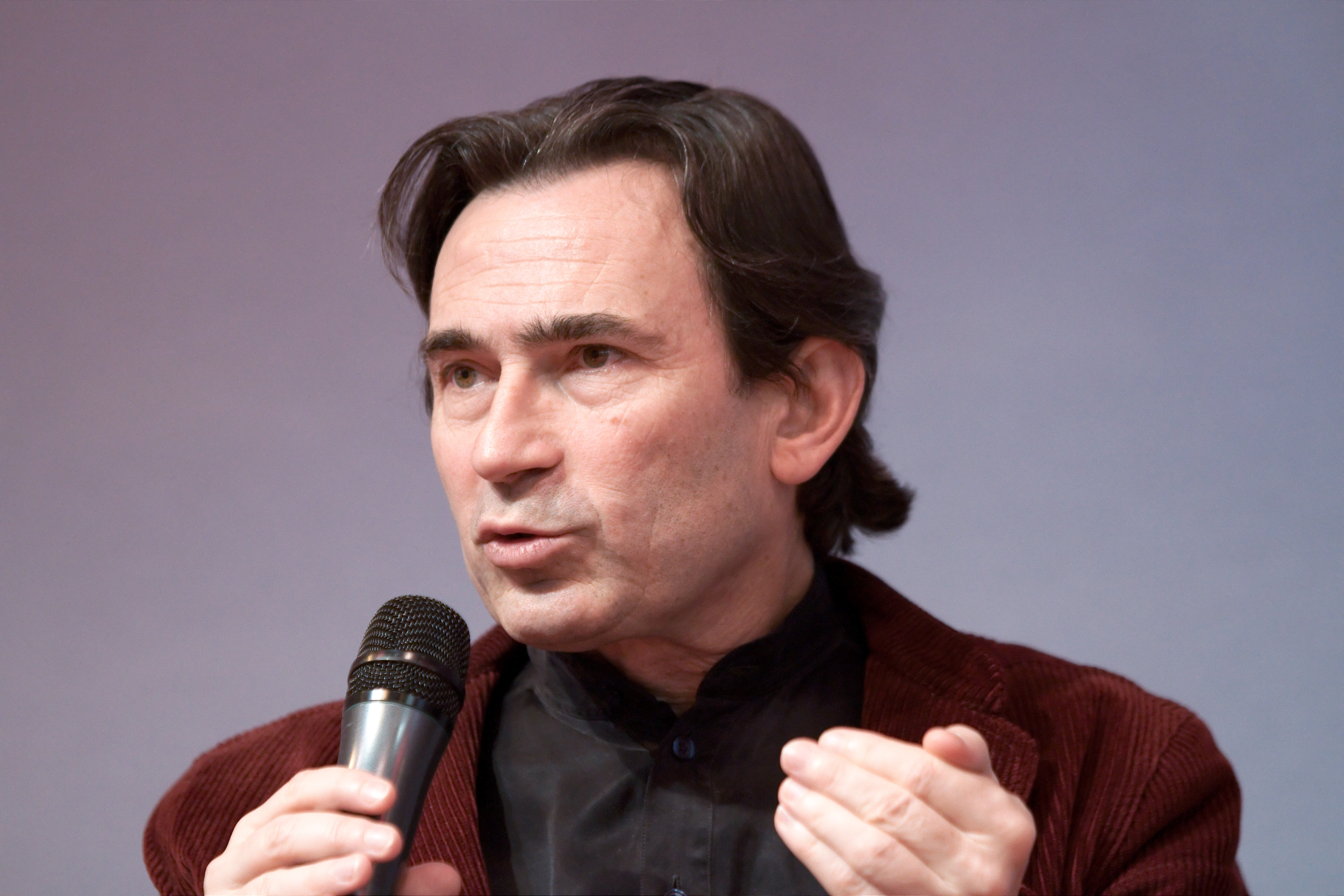
Hergé biographer Benoît Peeters considered The Blue Lotus to be a turning point in The Adventures of Tintin "both graphically and ideologically".

Hergé biographer Benoît Peeters thought that there was an obvious difference in The Adventures of Tintin before and after The Blue Lotus, and that it represented "an essential turning point both graphically and ideologically" as Hergé shifted from his former "classically right-wing" ideas. Also feeling that the work was "exceptionally moving," he noted that The Blue Lotus was far from Tintin in the Congo in its attitude to non-Europeans, while other Belgian comic strips like Blake and Mortimer and Buck Danny would continue to perpetuate negative stereotypes of East Asians for decades. Elsewhere, he stated that it was the first Adventure where Hergé "really took control" of the story, also opining that it was the "most politically involved" entity in the series.

Michael Farr stated that there was a "general agreement" that The Blue Lotus was Hergé's first masterpiece, being "better planned" than its predecessors and for the first time having "a carefully devised structure". At the same time he thought that it retained the best qualities of the earlier works. Thinking it "much more serious" than Tintin's prior Adventures, he nevertheless thought it "no less enjoyable", being the first story to bring "emotion and tragedy" to the series. Farr thought that Hergé's "total absorption" in his subject resulted in him gaining an "extraordinary feel" for it and allowed him to foresee future political events in China much like a "finely tuned" political commentator. He singled out the depiction of the Mukden Incident for particular praise, thinking it "a marvellous example of political satire". Philippe Goddin thought that this depiction of the build-up to invasion was "brilliantly" done, also comparing it to the scene of ethnic cleansing in Tintin in America.

Literary critic Tom McCarthy thought that The Blue Lotus showed evidence of Hergé's "left-wing counter-tendency" that rejected his earlier right-wing worldview. He believed that this was partly due to the influence of Zhang, who had destroyed Hergé's "European absolutism", and overall thought of it as "the most visually rich of all the Tintin books". Literary critic Jean-Marie Apostolidès of Stanford University thought that Wang signified the forces of good in the story while Rastapopoulos represented evil, and that the character Didi – who was poisoned with Raijaijah – inverted "the model of justice ruling the world of the Good". He saw a similarity between Didi and Tintin, who both have "feline suppleness, a devotion to good causes, and the patience of an animal stalking its prey". He furthermore argued that Didi's desire to behead people when under the poison's influence expressed his Oedipus complex and was a substitute for castration.

== Adaptations ==
The Blue Lotus was adapted into a 1991 episode of The Adventures of Tintin television series by French studio Ellipse and Canadian animation company Nelvana. Directed by Stéphane Bernasconi, Thierry Wermuth voiced the character of Tintin. In March 2013, Steven Spielberg said that The Blue Lotus might be the basis for the third Tintin film in his film series that began with The Adventures of Tintin (2011).

== See also ==
- Le Monde's 100 Books of the Century
