= Tushanwan =

Shanghainese Orphanage

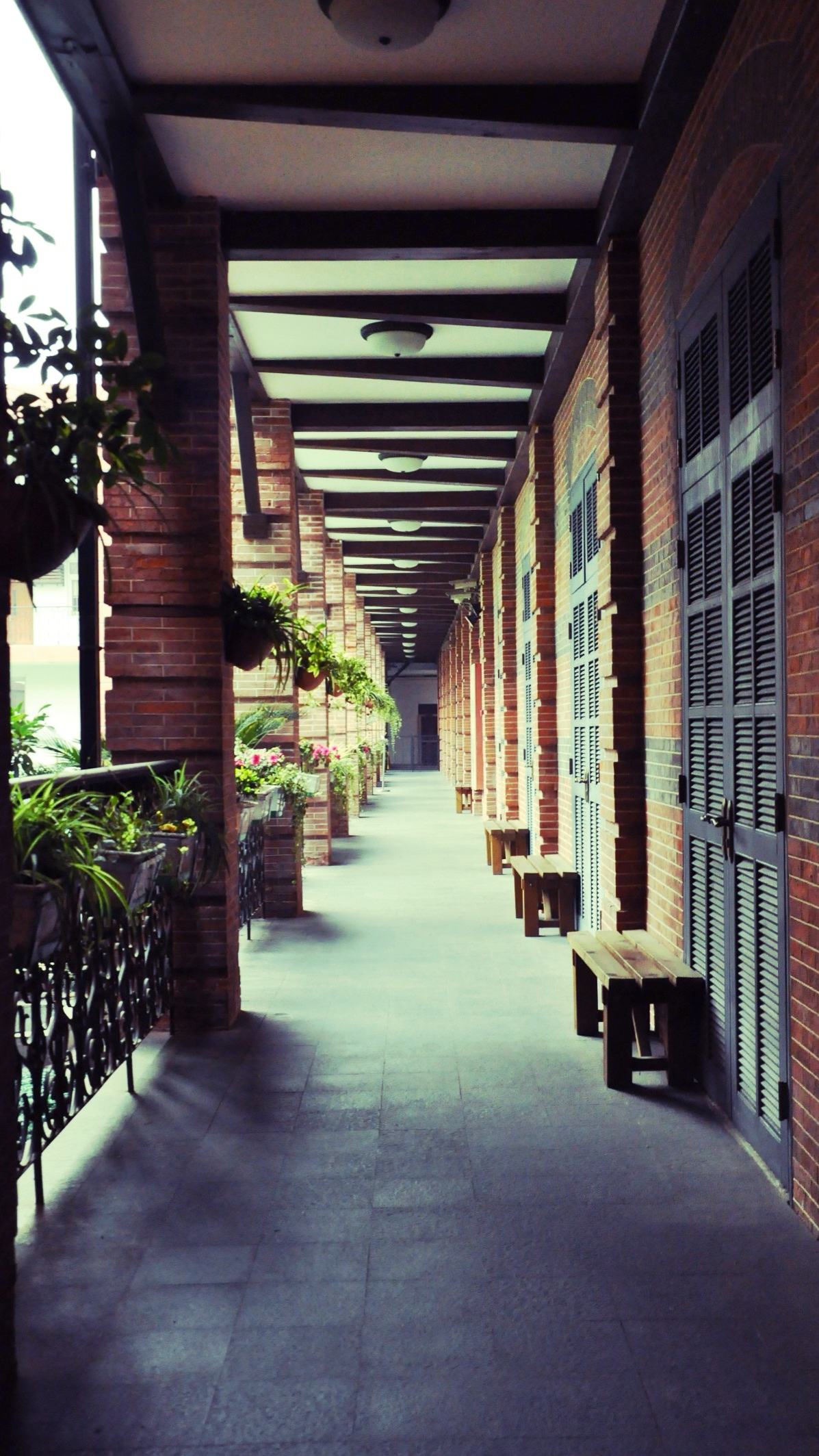
The site of the Tushanwan Orphanage, now a museum

Tushanwan (Chinese: 土山灣, French romanisation: Tousèwè, T'ou-Sè-Wè) was the name of a Jesuit-run orphanage and workshops in Shanghai from the 1860s to the 1940s. The workshops taught the orphaned boys vocational skills, and were of such high quality (with imported machinery and visiting tutors), that they offered the first training in Western arts and crafts in China, and had a significant influence on Chinese artists in the twentieth century. The Tushanwan Museum was opened in the former orphanage building on 12 June 2020.

== History ==
The name refers to the physical land on which the orphanage was built. Tushanwan is Mandarin for “curve where the earth forms a hill”, and the orphanage was indeed built on a hill near a stream filled with earth. T'ou-Sè-Wè was a French romanisation of the name. It is in the Xujiahui district of Shanghai (previously written Siccawei, Ziccawei, Zi-ka-wei).

The orphanage was not far from St. Ignatius Cathedral at the edge of the old Shanghai French Concession. Young boys were housed and given vocational training in carpentry, joinery, woodcarving, painting and other arts and crafts, including cloisonne and engraving. In 1886, there were 342 boys at the orphanage, 133 of whom worked in the workshops.

There was also a printing house, Imprimerie de l'orphelinat de T'ou-Sè-Wè, for which Father Casimir Hersant acquired the most modern machinery in 1874. The press published in French and Chinese numerous publications on history, geography, theology, devotion, natural sciences and astronomy, the series Variétés sinologiques and Latin manuals for priests and teachers.

Key figures at Tushanwan include Émile Chevreuil, who was the first director of the orphanage from 1864 to 1877 (but not 1870–1871), and again from 1882 to 1892. He was succeeded by Louis Bouvet and Joseph Lapparent. Father Juan Ferrer was the driving force behind the art workshop. Father Xavier Coupé ran the painting workshop for over thirty years from 1912 to 1936. Father Léo Mariot, an architect, founded the sculpture workshop.

Although the Jesuits were driven out in 1949 by the communists, the orphanage did not formally close until 1962. Over a hundred years, the orphanage educated several generations of Chinese artists, and developed many Chinese teachers.

Among its notable alumni are Zhang Chongren (1907–1998), who became director of the Shanghai Academy of Fine Arts and Xu Baoqing (徐宝庆; 1926–2008), famous for establishing Shanghai boxwood carving.

Works produced at the orphanage were shown at exhibitions in China and Europe and sold for the benefit of the orphanage. Some were also exhibited at World Fairs: the Exposition Universelle in Paris (1900), the Panama–Pacific International Exposition in San Francisco (1915), the Century of Progress in Chicago (1933), and the New York World's Fair in 1939, winning prizes and medals.

Major pieces displayed at the World's Fairs include a model of Xujiahui Architecture (Paris, 1900), the Table Screen of Our Lady of China and God and Son (St. Louis, 1904), Woodcarvings (Liege, 1905), and the elaborately carved pailou that was shown at three World Expos (San Francisco, 1915; Chicago, 1933; New York, 1939).

The pailou was purchased by the Field Museum in Chicago, but never displayed there, and since 2010 has been a highlight at the Tushanwan Museum.

A collection of model pagodas made at Tushanwan and exhibited in San Francisco has been restored and displayed in an exhibition at the Asian Civilisations Museum, Singapore, 2024–2025.

A model of the Porcelain Tower of Nanjing was also created at the Tushanshan workshop.

The Chinese Pavilion in Laeken Park, Brussels, commissioned by Leopold II of Belgium in the 1900s, was made at Tushanwan.
