= Qibao Temple =

Buddhist temple in Shanghai, China

Coordinates: 31.1568°N 121.3535°E

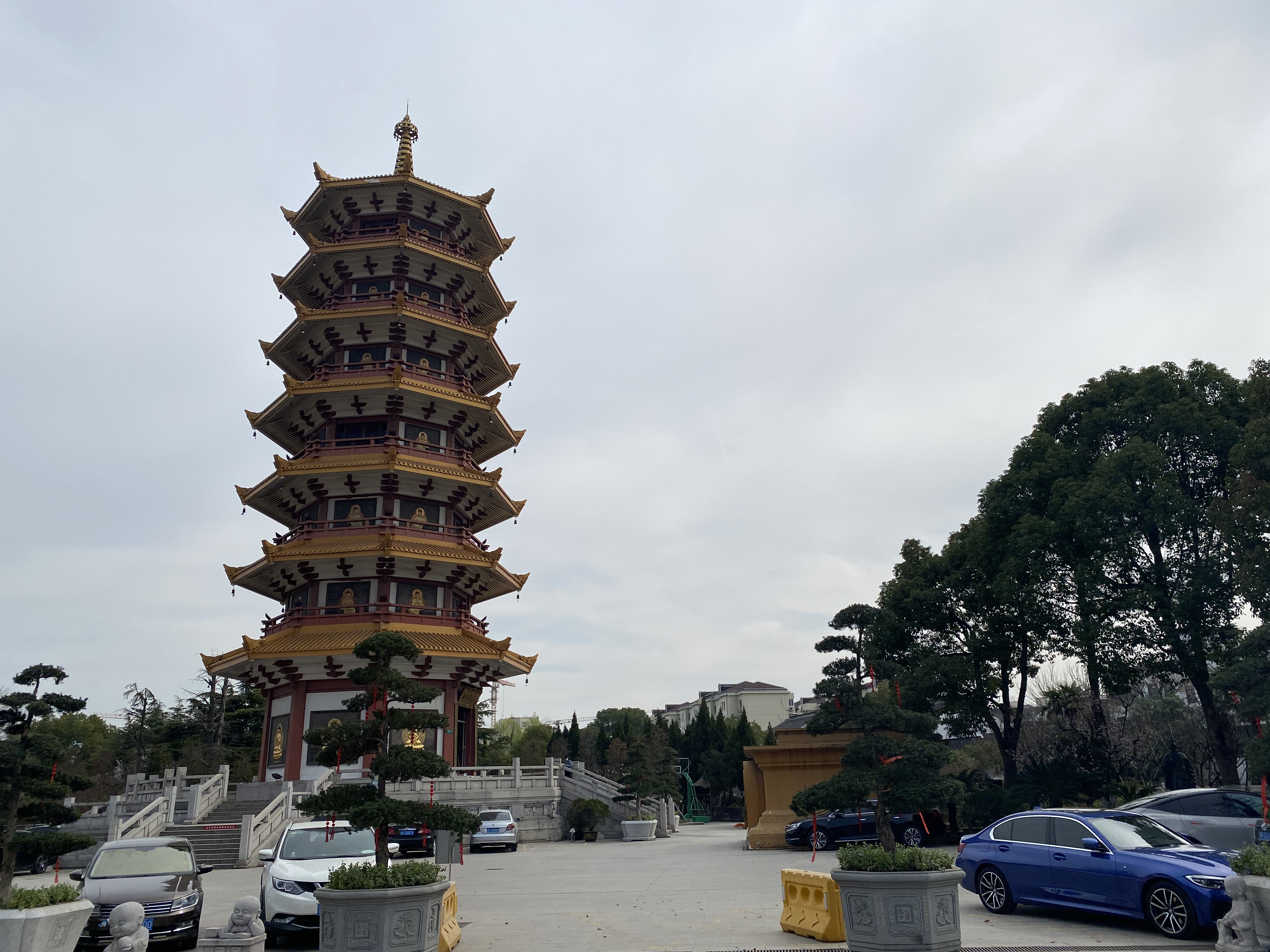
The Qibao Temple and Pagoda

Qibao Temple is a Buddhist temple located in Qibao, Minhang, Shanghai, in China. The entire temple complex is 7,700 square meters. Containing a Bell drum tower, Hall of Four Heavenly Kings, Mahavira Hall, Dharma Hall, Zangjing ge, Sangha residence, and guest rooms.In addition, the temple features a seven-story Pagoda and a 10-meter-tall Dhvaja, as well as seven treasures (Flying Buddha, Golden Lotus Sutra, Golden Rooster, Jade Chopsticks, Jade Axe, Floating Bell, and the Sacred Tree). To the east and west of Qibao Temple are two gardens. The eastern garden is planted with peonies and other flowers, while the western garden is planted with trees.

== History ==
During the Later Jin dynasty of the Five Dynasties and Ten Kingdoms period, members of the Lu family constructed a temple on Lu Bao Mountain in Songjiang Prefecture to honor Lu Ji and Lu Yun, naming it Lu Bao Yuan (陆宝院 lit. 'Treasures of Lu Court'). On one occasion, Qian Liu, King of Wuyue, visited Lu Bao Yuan. However, he mistakenly heard it referred to as Liu Bao Yuan (七寶院 lit. 'Seven Treasures Court'). He then presented his handwritten copy of the Golden-Letter Lotus Sutra to his consort, remarking, “This, too, is a treasure!” After this, Lu Bao Yuan was renamed Qibao Yuan.

As clay from Lu Bao Mountain was used to make earthenware pottery, the hill was gradually leveled. After relocating several times, Qibao temple finally settled in Qibao Town during the early Song dynasty. In 1008, Emperor Zhenzong bestowed a plaque upon the temple, designating it a Buddhist monastery.

In 1862, the Taiping army clashed with Qing forces, including the Ever Victorious Army, in Qibao. The ensuing battle resulted in the destruction of Qibao Temple.

Reconstruction of the temple began in 2000, and was completed in 2002. A consecration ceremony was held on January 23, 2003.
