= Chilbosan (North Gyeongsang) =

Mountain in South Korea

Highest point
- Elevation: 469 m (1,539 ft)

Geography
- Location: North Gyeongsang Province, South Korea

Chilbosan is a mountain of North Gyeongsang Province, eastern South Korea. It has an elevation of 469 metres.

== See also ==
- List of mountains of Korea
