= Chilbosan (North Jeolla) =

Mountain in South Korea

Highest point
- Elevation: 469 m (1,539 ft)

Geography
- Location: North Jeolla Province, South Korea

Chilbosan (Korean: 칠보산) is a mountain of North Jeolla Province, western South Korea. It has an elevation of 469 metres.

== See also ==
- List of mountains of Korea
