= Chilbosan (North Chungcheong) =

Mountain in Goesan, South Korea

Highest point
- Elevation: 778 m (2,552 ft)

Geography
- Location: South Korea

Korean name
- Hangul: 칠보산
- Hanja: 七寶山
- RR: Chilbosan
- MR: Ch'ilbosan

Chilbosan (Korean: 칠보산) is a mountain in Goesan County, North Chungcheong Province in South Korea. It has an elevation of 778 m (2,552 ft).

== See also ==
- List of mountains in Korea
