= Numa Sadoul =

French writer, actor, and director

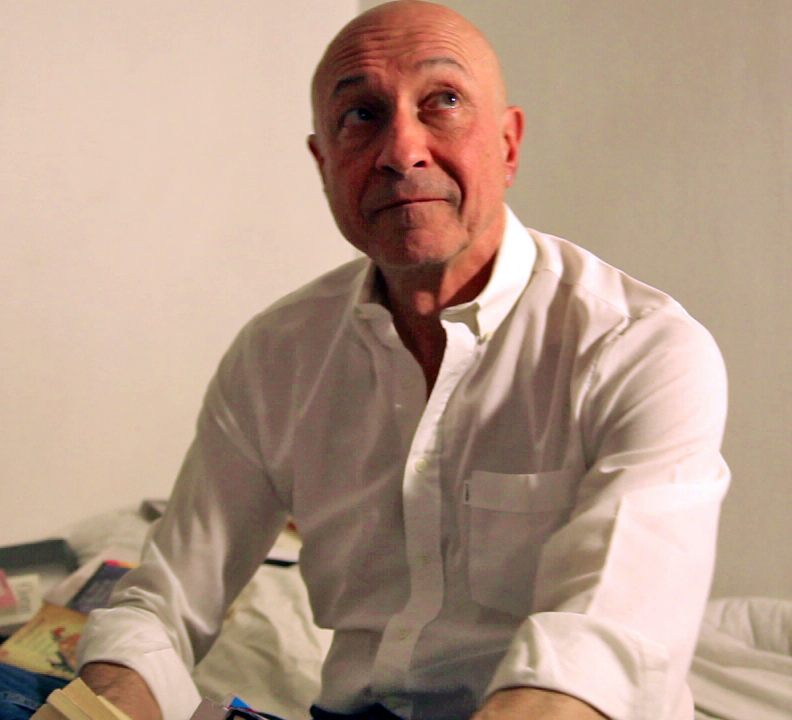
- Sadoul on the set of the movie Nuit de veille, in 2010
- Born: May 7, 1947; Brazzaville
- Known for: Interview of Belgian cartoonist Hergé

Numa Sadoul (born 7 May 1947, Brazzaville, French Equatorial Africa (now Republic of Congo) is a French writer, actor, and director, who has been a resident of France since 1966.

== Biography ==
Numa Sadoul was born on May 7, 1947, in Brazzaville, Congo, where his father, Numa Sadoul, was Governor of Overseas France. He lived for 19 years in Africa - Congo, Gabon, Djibouti - and Madagascar, before settling in the South of France in 1966, when his father retired. Since that time, he has never left the Côte d´Azur.

His childhood in Madagascar earned him the honor of being the guest of honor at the SO BD 2020 fair in Paris, which focused on Malagasy comic literature.

If the success of Tintin and I - Tintin et moi makes him known to the public, the artistic life of Numa Sadoul has been divided for more than fifty years between two worlds: stages (opera, theater ...) and writing (reviews, press, interviews with authors of BD, novel), with long periods when he abandons one or other of these means of expression.

Literature

Writer, playwright, and journalist, he wrote his first poems when he was 7 years old. His poems, and short stories as well, have been published in newspapers at 16, then he released his first book, a collection of plays, in 1970. Over thirty books were published since then, in all genres of writing.

As a student, Sadoul interviewed and befriended the famous Belgian cartoonist Hergé, famous for his Adventures of Tintin— an unexpected coup, as Hergé gave few interviews. The interviews were recorded on 14 hours of tape, and, after heavy editing by Hergé, released as a book: Tintin et moi / entretiens avec Hergé (Tintin and I: Interviews with Hergé), in 1975. In 2003, the book was used as a basis for a documentary film Tintin and I, directed by Anders Østergaard.

Sadoul has also published interviews with other leading Franco-Belgian comics artists, such as André Franquin (Et Franquin créa la gaffe, 1986), Jacques Tardi (Tardi, 2000), (Vuillemin, 2000), as well as books on Gotlib (Gotlib, 1974) and Uderzo (2000).

Particularly noteworthy are his interview books with French comic artist Jean "Mœbius" Giraud. Sadoul followed the career of Giraud closely from the mid-1970s onward until the latter's death in 2012, conducting extensive interviews with the artist throughout this period of time, which resulted in three consecutive interview books, Mister Mœbius et Docteur Gir (1976), Mœbius: Entretiens avec Numa Sadoul (1991), and Docteur Mœbius et Mister Gir (2015), the latter two being each an updated and expanded version of the previous one. Excepting parts of the first book (in SCHTROUMPF: Les cahiers de la BD, issue 25, July 1974), none of the later interviews had seen prior magazine publication, be it in part or in whole. The last version therefore was a posthumous account where the last two decades of Giraud's life were concerned.

As a kid, Sadoul was as fascinated by the stage as he was by comics. At the age of 23, he set up his own theater company (Orbe-recherche Théâtrale) in Rouen. Since then, as head of his troupe Les Enfants Terribles, he has filled every position connected with the stage: actor, director, author, stage manager, and drama teacher, in addition to head of a theater school for children and teens in a town on the French Riviera. Later, in the 1960s and 1970s, his passion for the stage combined with that for vocal music would lead Sadoul to become an opera critic, before integrating the trade in 1977 as a full-blown opera director; he has been invited to produce operas and plays alike on the most prestigious stages in France, from Lille and Bordeaux to Nice and Marseille. This part of his life is recounted in the 2016 book "Forty Years at the Opera, Egodictionnaire de l'art lyrique".

== Publications ==
Play, Drama

- Oratorio and Le Sang des feuilles mortes, Pierre-Jean Oswald, Collection « Théâtre en France », 1970
- Bianca Castafiore, Le Récital, magazine des Amis de Hergé numero 42, septembre 2006

Essays

- Archétypes et concordances dans la BD moderne, Chez l’Auteur, 1971.
- Gotlib, Albin Michel, Collection "Graffiti", 1974
- Mister Moebius et Docteur Gir, Albin Michel, Collection "Graffiti", 1976
- Histoire de la bande dessinée en France et en Belgique (collective work), Glénat, 1979. Updated, 1984
- Les Papagalli, bouffons, Glénat, 1992

Stories, novels

- Mémoires d'Adam François San Hurcelo Lumneri, pornographe, L'Or du Temps/Régine Deforges, 1971 - Publication has been banned. New edition in progress. Excerpts in Anthologie de la fessée et de la flagellation, La Musardine, 1998
- Une soirée gagnée, in collectif Lieux d'écrits, Fondation Royaumont, 1987
- Carnaval des vampires (pseudonym Frank Henry), Collection « Gore » numero107, Éditions Vaugirard, 1990
- La Chatte de la vieille dame (illustrations d’Alfred), Ciel Éther, 1995

Dictionary

- 40ans à l'opéra - Égo-dictionnaire de l'art lyrique, Éditions Dumane (20251 Pietraserena)

Interviews

- Tintin et moi, Entretiens avec Hergé, Casterman, 1975; Rééditions, 1983, 1989, 2000 et 2004 — Paperback at « Champs », Flammarion, 2003
- Mister Moebius et docteur Gir, Albin Michel, 1976
- Portraits à la plume et au pinceau, Glénat, 1977
- Et Franquin créa la gaffe, Distri BD/Schlirf, 1986
- Entretiens avec Moebius, Casterman, 1991 (1976 updated edition). Prix Max et Moritz awarded Best in Seconady literature 1993)
- Le Livre d'or de Mordillo, Glénat, 1999
- Tardi, Niffle-Cohen, collection « Profession », 2000
- Philippe Vuillemin|Vuillemin, Niffle-Cohen, collection « Profession », 2000
- Astérix et compagnie : entretiens avec Uderzo, Hachette, 2001
- Les Dessinateurs de presse : entretiens avec Cabu, Charb, Pierre Kroll|Kroll, Luz (dessinateur)|Luz, Pétillon, Siné, Willem et Wolinski, Glénat, 2014
- Docteur Moebius et Mister Gir : entretiens avec Jean Giraud, Casterman, 2015. (1976 updated edition)
- Entretiens avec Gotlib, Dargaud, 2018
- Uderzo l'irréductible : entretiens avec Albert Uderzo, Hachette, 2018
- Et Franquin créa la gaffe : entretiens avec André Franquin, in progress, Dupuis, 2019 (1986 updated edition, sold out)

Bandes dessinées

- La Tétralogie de l'Anneau du Nibelung, from Richard Wagner, comics by France Renoncé, Dargaud, collection « Histoires Fantastiques »
  - L'or du Rhin, 1982
  - La Walkyrie, 1982 Awarded Gold Medal, City of Nice, France at the Festival du livre 1982, Great Prize of the city of Paris 1982.
  - Siegfried, 1984
  - Le Crépuscule des dieux, 1984
- La Chatte de la vieille dame, drawings by Alfred, Ciel Éther, collection « Strawberry Field », 1995
