= Qibao station (Shanghai Metro) =

Shanghai Metro station

Qibao 七宝
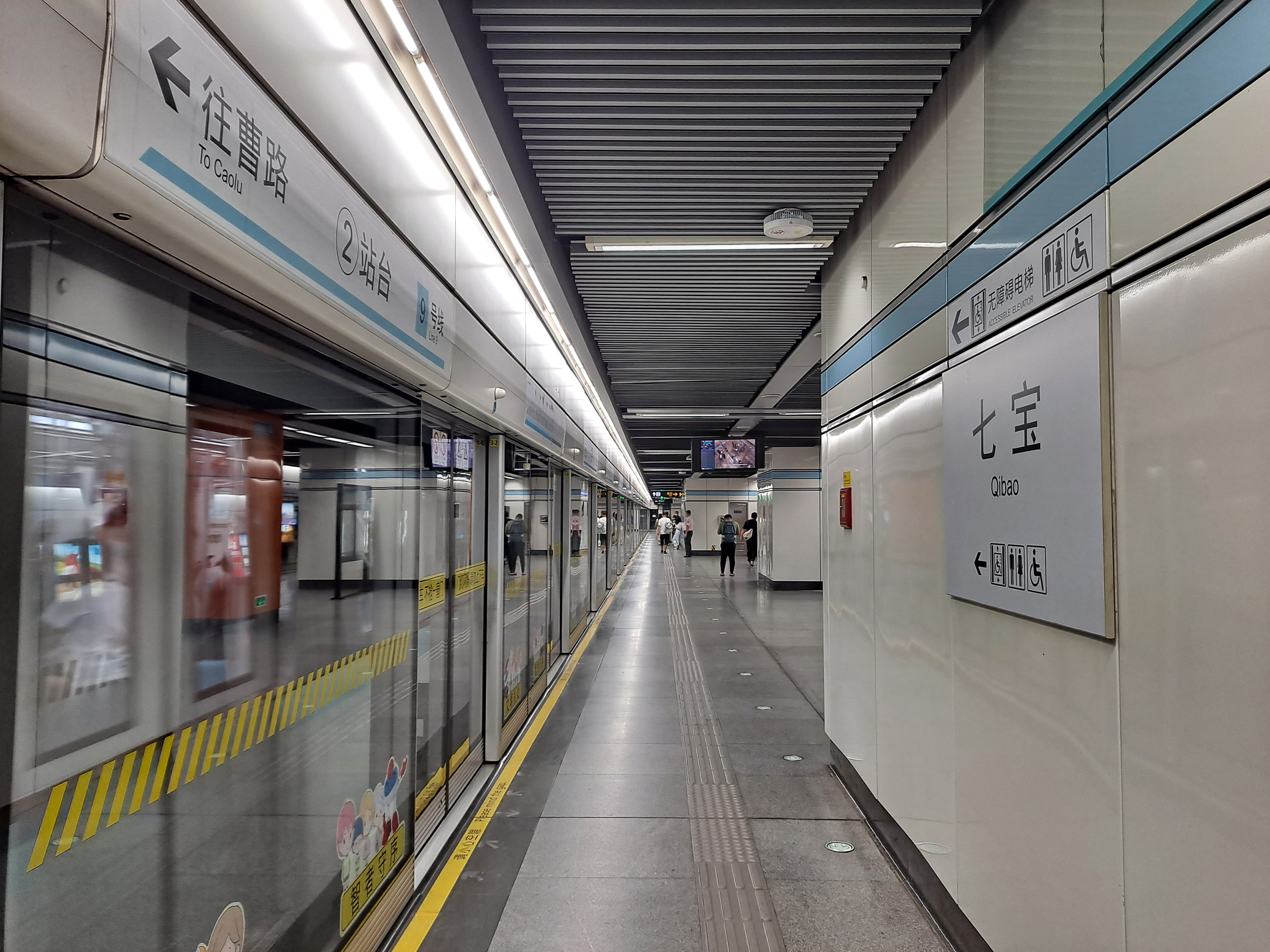
- Station platform

General information
- Location: Caobao Road and Qixin Road; Qibao, Minhang District, Shanghai; China
- Coordinates: 31.1569°N 121.343°E
- Operator: Shanghai No. 1 Metro Operation Co. Ltd.
- Line: Line 9
- Platforms: 2 (1 island platform)
- Tracks: 2

Construction
- Structure type: Underground
- Accessible: Yes

History
- Opened: December 29, 2007

Services
Preceding station	Shanghai Metro	Following station
Zhongchun Road towards Shanghai Songjiang Railway Station	Line 9	Xingzhong Road towards Caolu
Location
- Location within Shanghai

Qibao (simplified Chinese: 七宝; traditional Chinese: 七寶; pinyin: Qībǎo) is the name of an underground station on Line 9 of the Shanghai Metro. It is located in Qibao, Minhang District, near a popular tourist attraction to the south, Qibao Old Town (from Exit 2).

The station, situated at the crossing point of Caobao Road, a part of Shanghai Highway S124, and Qixin Road, significantly facilitates traveling in the area.

It has become a focal point for the buses that shuttle among nearby residence blocks, since both Qibao Route 2 and Minhang Route 33 (Former Qibao Route 1), two shuttle bus lines in Qibao town, stop at this station.

== See also ==
- Qibao Old Town
- Qibao
