= Qibao =

Town in Minhang, Shanghai, China

Qibao 七宝镇
- Town
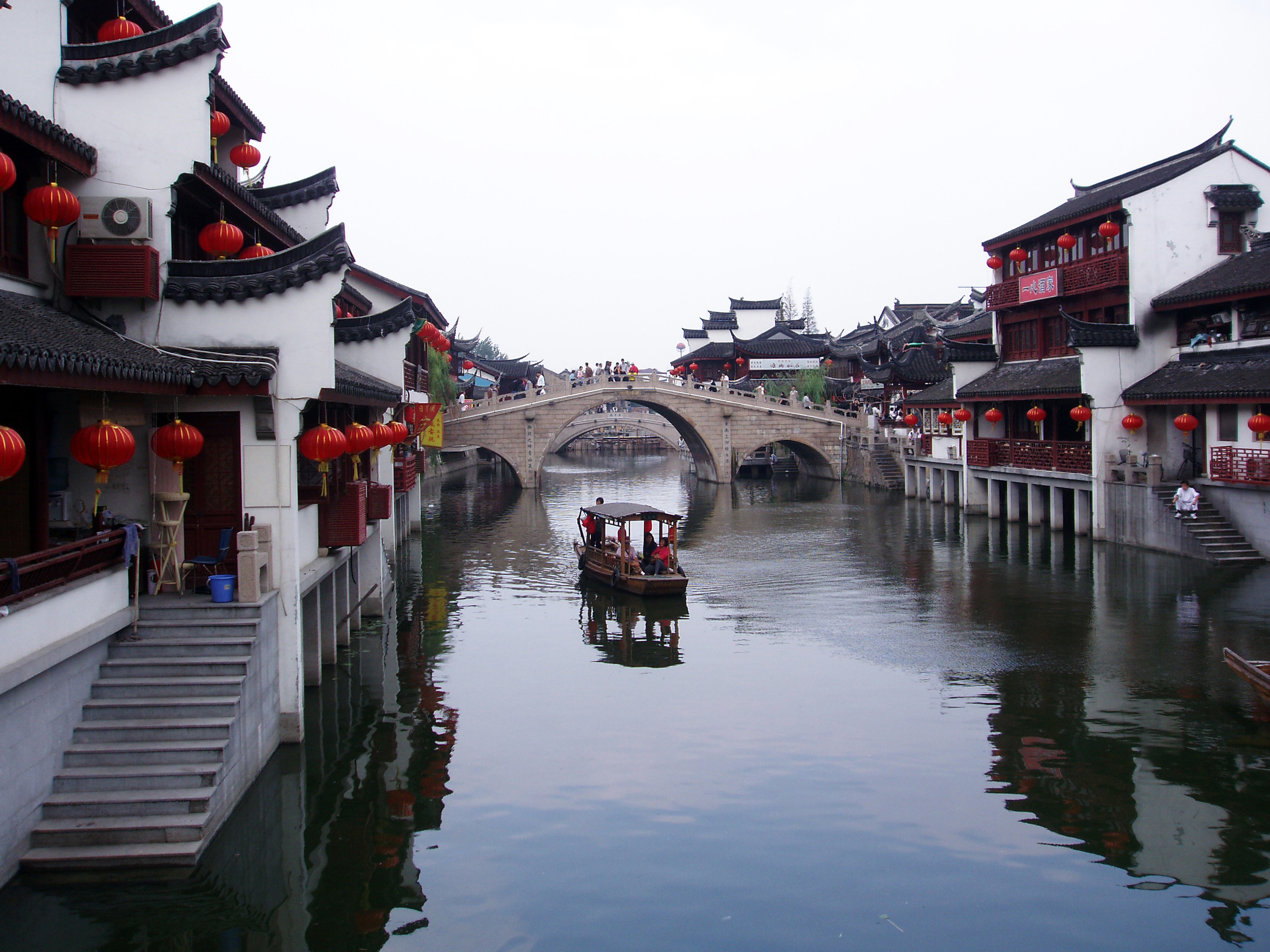
- Qibao Old Town

- Location in Shanghai
- Coordinates: 31°09′28″N 121°21′05″E
- Country: People's Republic of China
- Municipality: Shanghai
- District: Minhang
- Village-level divisions: 54 residential communities 9 villages
- Elevation: 7 m (23 ft)
- Time zone: UTC+8 (China Standard)
- Postal code: 201101
- Area code: 0021
- Website: http://www.qibao.gov.cn/

Qibao (simplified Chinese: 七宝镇; traditional Chinese: 七寶鎮; pinyin: Qībǎo Zhèn; Shanghainese: Tshih^{4}pau^{2}) is a town in Minhang District, Shanghai. Its formation can be traced back to the Five Dynasties and Ten Kingdoms period, to the Northern Song Dynasty. The name comes from the local temple, "Qibao Temple". Today, Qibao is a tourist attraction, in the area known as Qibao Old Town by the Puhui River with traditional Chinese architecture and a number of attractions, including museums and street food.

The town was also once the residence of the noted painter Zhang Chongren, a friend of the Belgian cartoonist Hergé, on whom the character Chang Chong-Chen from "The Adventures of Tintin" was based. Qibao is also known for crickets (with a "Cricket House") in the Qibao Old Town area.

== Location ==
Located in the western suburbs of Shanghai, Qibao covers an area of 21.3 square kilometres (8.2 sq mi). It can be accessed by taking Shanghai Metro Line 9 to Qibao Station. As of 2011, it has 54 residential communities (居委会) and nine villages under its administration.

== See also ==
- List of twin towns and sister cities in China
- Qibao Old Town
- Qibao Station (Shanghai Metro)
- Qibao Buddhist Temple
