= Chang Chong-Chen =

Comic character by Belgian cartoonist Hergé

- Chang, by Hergé

Publication information
- Publisher: Casterman (Belgium)
- First appearance: The Blue Lotus (1935); The Adventures of Tintin
- Created by: Hergé

In-story information
- Full name: Chang Chong-Chen
- Partnerships: List of main characters
- Supporting character of: Tintin

Chang Chong-Chen
- Traditional Chinese: 張仲仁
- Simplified Chinese: 张仲仁
Transcriptions
Standard Mandarin
- Hanyu Pinyin: Zhāng Zhòngrén
- IPA: [ʈʂáŋ ʈʂʊ̂ŋ.ɻə̌n]

Chang Chong-Chen (French: Tchang Tchong-Jen) is a fictional character in The Adventures of Tintin, the comics series by Belgian cartoonist Hergé. Although Chang and Tintin only know each other for a short time, they form a deep bond which drives them to tears when they separate or are re-united.

Chang was based on the Chinese artist Zhang Chongren, a real friend of Hergé's.

The story that introduced him was to have a major effect on Hergé and Tintin, making it one of the most popular series of all time.

== Character history ==
In the process of planning his story, Hergé was contacted by a Father Gosset, chaplain to the Chinese students at Louvain University, who suggested that he do some actual research into life in China as it really was. Hergé agreed and Gosset introduced him to Zhang Chongren, a student at the Académie Royale des Beaux-Arts in Brussels.

The two men, both aged 27, got on well and Hergé decided to include his new friend in the story. Zhang supplied much of the Chinese writing that was to feature and told Hergé a lot about Chinese culture, history and drawing techniques. He also gave a detailed description of life in 1930s China, which included the occupation of eastern territories by the Japanese, British and Americans and other Western powers.

The result of their meetings was the story The Blue Lotus, a major landmark in the development of The Adventures of Tintin. From that time onwards Hergé would research his subjects thoroughly. He also changed his attitude towards the relationship between native peoples and foreigners. He had previously taken a positive view of imperialism in Tintin in the Congo (published in 1930). Now, in The Blue Lotus (1934-35), he criticised the Japanese occupation of China and featured an event inspired by the Mukden incident. The Shanghai International Settlement, with its racist Western businessmen and corrupt police (which includes White and Sikh officers), was also shown in a bad light.

== Meeting Tintin ==
Tintin meets Chang in the original black and white edition of The Blue Lotus (serialised in Le Petit Vingtième in 1935): "That's better, eh?... So, what's your name?... Mine's Tintin." "I'm Chang... But... why did you rescue me?" "!!?"

The fictional Chang first appeared in The Blue Lotus as a young orphan whom Tintin saved from drowning. The first thing he asked was why a white foreigner like Tintin would bother saving a non-white boy at all (Tintin was to cause similar queries when helping Zorrino in Prisoners of the Sun). He and Tintin then exchanged notes on the prejudice that Chinese and non-Chinese have for each other and laughed it away. In his description of Western prejudices, Tintin includes a Fu Manchu-like character. (In fact The Blue Lotus features a Japanese villain called Mitsuhirato.)

They then became friends and Chang led Tintin to Hukow where he was on the trail of a kidnapped doctor. There they stayed with a friend of Chang's late father. They later encountered Thomson and Thompson who had arrived dressed as figures out of a Chinese opera and were being followed with amusement by half the population.

Thomson and Thompson had been sent to arrest Tintin and took him to the local police station in order to start extradition proceedings. However, they had lost a document written in Chinese which instructed the local police to give them assistance. Chang replaced the paper with another one which claimed that Thomson and Thompson were "lunatics and this proves it". When he read the document, the chief of police roared with laughter, then he had Thomson and Thompson thrown out and Tintin released.

Chang also saved Tintin from a Japanese agent dressed as a photographer who had been sent to kill him.

Tintin took Chang with him back to Shanghai in order to settle his scores with his enemy Mitsuhirato. Tintin was staying at the headquarters of the Sons of the Dragon, a secret society that fought against the trafficking of opium. Chang moved in with them and joined in the battle of wits against a major gang of opium smugglers.

Chang played a crucial part in the capture of the leaders of the gang and saving Tintin and others from execution. The crooks included Tintin's arch-enemy Rastapopoulos. After that Chang was adopted by Tintin's ally Wang Chen-Yee.

Tintin and Snowy then left for Europe amid a tearful and emotional farewell to Chang and his new family.

== Chang and the Yeti ==
Chang remained unmentioned in the stories until Tintin in Tibet, published 24 years later in 1960. In this story, Chang sends Tintin a letter in which he announces his imminent move from Hong Kong, where he had been living, to London in order to work in an antique shop owned by a brother of Wang's. His aeroplane, however, crashes over the mountains of Tibet. Chang survives the disaster while all his fellow passengers perish, and is rescued by the yeti, the mythical creature said to live in the Himalayas. The yeti takes care of Chang, providing him with food, but when rescue arrives, he also takes Chang, weak with fever, as far away as possible.

Tintin is convinced that Chang is not dead, after seeing him in a dream calling for help. Against all logic he sets off to find him, with the grudging help of Captain Haddock who, along with almost everyone else, believes Chang to be deceased.

Tintin and Haddock eventually track Chang and the yeti down to another cave, and manage to get him out, following a tearful reunion.

Although he has to leave him, Chang is very grateful to the yeti for keeping him alive and describes him as "poor snowman", rather than "abominable". When Tintin wonders if he might one day be captured, Chang objects to this, feeling that the yeti should be looked upon as a human rather than a wild animal.

Chang later goes to London from where he keeps in touch, sending letters to Tintin and Haddock (see The Castafiore Emerald).

Tintin in Tibet was perhaps Hergé's most deeply personal work. When he wrote it, he had not seen the real-life Zhang for several decades. Later, in 1981, the French media managed to find Zhang in China and arrange a trip to Europe for a reunion with Hergé. In 1985, Zhang received French citizenship and settled in Paris to teach, where he died in 1998.

== See also ==
- List of The Adventures of Tintin characters
