= The Adventures of Tintin publication history =

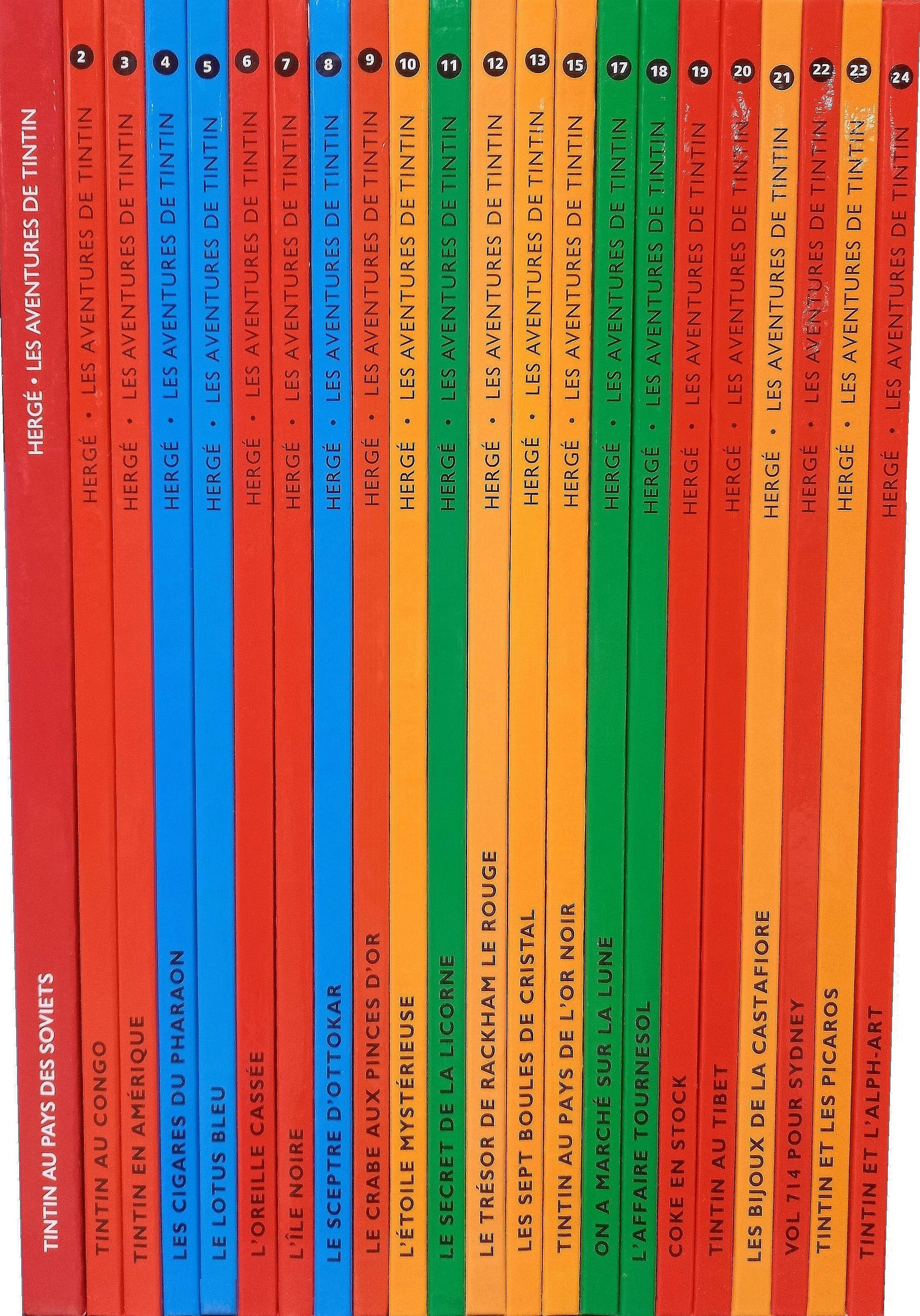
A collection of Tintin albums, in 2020.

The Adventures of Tintin, a comic book series created by Belgian cartoonist Hergé, has a publication history of 24 albums, including one unfinished adventure. Each story, except the last, was pre-published in a newspaper or magazine before being published as an album. The first adventure in the series, Tintin in the Land of the Soviets, was launched on January 10, 1929, in Le Petit Vingtième, the weekly youth supplement of the Catholic, nationalist, and conservative Belgian daily Le Vingtième Siècle. It was in this same periodical that all stories written before the Second World War were published, until Tintin in the Land of Black Gold was discontinued after the invasion of Belgium in May 1940.

The series resumed the following September in Le Soir, a daily whose circulation was almost twenty times that of Le Petit Vingtième, for the duration of the German occupation of Belgium. After the country's liberation, Hergé was banned from publishing for a time, before finally resuming his activities in a new periodical, Tintin magazine, created by Raymond Leblanc, whose first issue appeared in September 1946. Until he died in 1983, all the cartoonist's stories appeared in this periodical. Le Vingtième Siècle also published the first three adventures in album form, before Hergé signed an exclusive contract with Casterman. Initially in black and white, the albums were printed directly in color from 1942 onwards, entailing a lengthy reworking of the first stories to adapt them to the new standard format of 62 colorized plates.

The various adventures were also published in newspapers and magazines around the world. The series was first published in France in the weekly Cœurs Vaillants, then in Switzerland in L'Echo illustré, while the Portuguese newspaper O Papagaio offered Tintin its first translation in 1936. In 1940, Hergé's hero made his debut in Belgium's Dutch-language press, before enjoying wide distribution and international success from the 1950s onwards. This was also the period when the first foreign-language albums were produced, reaching over 100 translations by the 2010s, including many dialects and regional languages.

As the Adventures of Tintin are published in periodicals around the world, they undergo several changes, whether for commercial or editorial reasons. The author's original texts and drawings are sometimes adapted without his consent. Likewise, the series' foreign publishers force the author to make numerous alterations, both to correct his work and to comply with censorship.

== Original publications ==
=== Creation of the series in Le Petit Vingtième ===
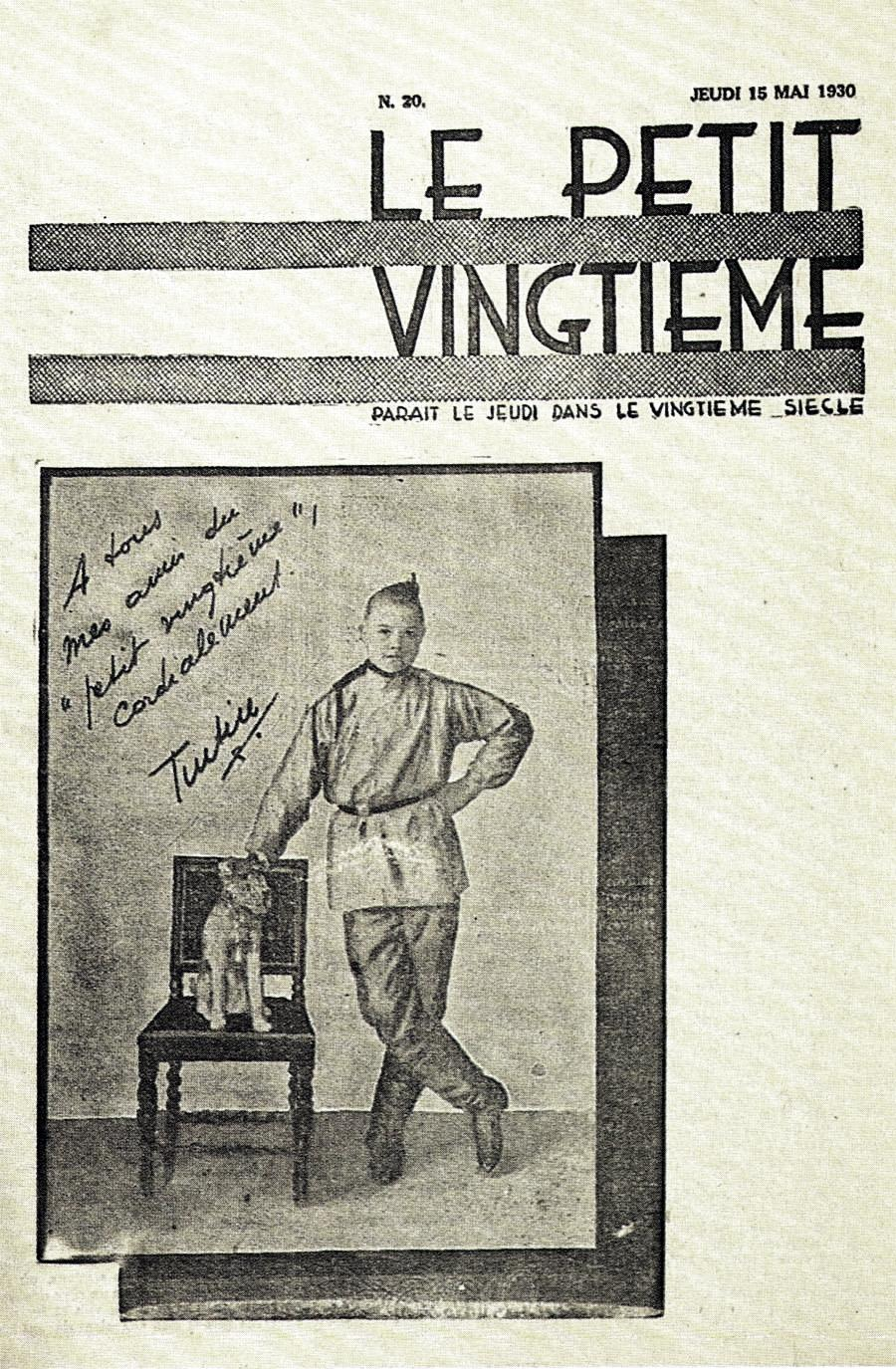
Cover of Le Petit Vingtième, Thursday, May 15, 1930, showing Tintin and Snowy returning from the land of the Soviets.

Hergé joined the subscription department of Le Vingtième Siècle, a conservative Catholic daily run by Norbert Wallez, in September 1925, where he was employed as a photojournalist and cartoonist from August 1927, after completing his military service. His work consisted mainly of illustrating stories serialized in the daily paper or its literary supplement, while continuing to contribute to other periodicals such as Le Boy-Scout belge, in which he published Les Aventures de Totor, C. P. des Hannetons, and Le Sifflet, a Catholic and satirical Sunday weekly.

In 1928, Norbert Wallez put him in charge of Le Petit Vingtième, a weekly youth supplement whose first issue appeared on November 1. It was in this periodical that Tintin au pays des Soviets, the first episode in the Adventures of Tintin, appeared on January 10, 1929.

The story was published up to May 8, 1930, with two plates published every Thursday in the centerfold, for a total of 69 episodes. The December 25, 1929 issue, a special Christmas edition, includes several special features. It featured double the number of pages and, for the first time, a cover designed by Hergé. It also contained three plates of Tintin's adventures, instead of two, (Note: One of these three plates was not included in the album.) two of which were printed in a two-color process, an exception until the adventures published during World War II.

From the very first story, Hergé and his team sought to win the loyalty of their readers by mixing fiction and reality. (Note: Eugène van Nijverseel, known as Evany, and Paul Jamin were recruited as Hergé's collaborators at Le Petit Vingtième, from January 1, 1929 and March 1930 respectively. See Peeters (2011, pp. 91–92)) They included fictitious interviews with Tintin in the pages of Le Petit Vingtième or published a fake threatening letter from the Guepeu to stop the reporter's activities in the USSR. This innovative and interactive practice is of major commercial interest, as Geoffroy Kursner points out: "Dialoguing, even playing with readers, to build loyalty and increase the number of readers, and, above all, mixing fiction and reality, is undeniably an ingenious method". One of Le Vingtième Siècle's contributors, Charles Lesne, suggested that Abbé Wallez stage Tintin's return to Belgium as if his adventures had taken place. (Note: Goddin (2007, p. 314)) The event, generously publicized by the daily in the days leading up to it, took place on May 8, 1930, at Brussels' Gare du Nord, and drew a large crowd. Young Lucien Pepermans, a 15-year-old scout, was chosen to play the role of Tintin. A welcome speech was given, followed by a wreath of flowers and the distribution of sweets, while the fake Tintin signed autographs.

Norbert Wallez also decided to bring together the plates from Tintin in the Land of the Soviets in an album, an "intuition [that] was by no means obvious, especially for a press publisher", according to Benoît Peeters. Planned for the Salon de l'Enfant to be held in Brussels at the end of June 1930, the album didn't come out until the following September and was a huge success. The ten thousand copies sold testify to the considerable success of the operation throughout French-speaking Belgium. A numbered edition of 500 copies was made available to the first subscribers, each signed by Tintin and Snowy. Hergé signed the young reporter, while Germaine Kieckens, Abbé Wallez's secretary and Hergé's future wife, signed his faithful companion.

=== First success and signature at Casterman ===
On May 22, 1930, the front page of Le Petit Vingtième showed Tintin and Snowy pondering their future destination in front of an oversized globe. The central double-page spread, illustrated by Hergé, shows the two heroes comfortably installed in their home, with Tintin even wearing a robe and slippers. The new adventure, Tintin in the Congo, finally began on June 5, 1930, and ran until June 18, 1931. The supplement's pagination increased and was enriched with new stories, such as the Quick and Flupke gags. As of May 1931, readers no longer needed to buy the daily to read its Thursday supplement: the Le Petit Vingtième subscription, previously reserved for schools and patronages, was extended to individuals. As with Tintin in the Land of the Soviets, the return of Tintin and Snowy from the Congo is orchestrated by Le Vingtième Siècle and celebrated at Brussels' Gare du Nord on July 9. The event was accompanied by a commercial operation: the album, already ready, was put on sale on the spot, accompanied by a piece of Congolese art. (Note: Peeters (2011, p. 101))

Celebrating the return of Tintin and Snowy from the Congo, July 9, 1931.

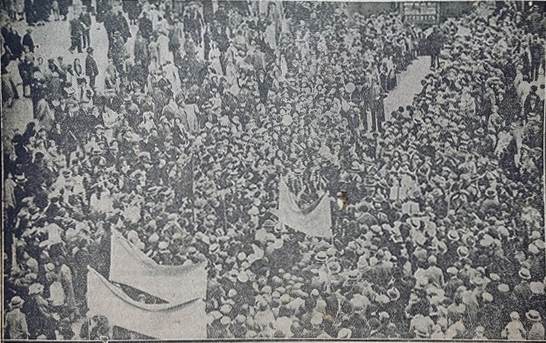
A crowd gathered to welcome the heroes.

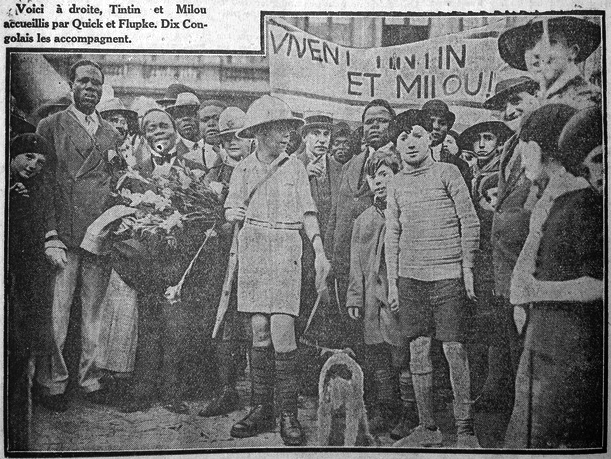
Tintin and Snowy were greeted by Quick and Flupke.

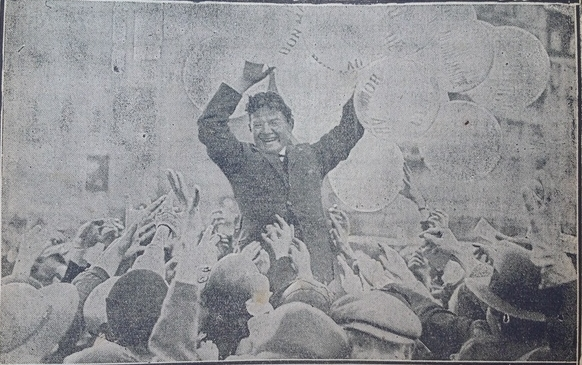
Image of a cheering crowd.

Les Aventures de Tintin, reporter, à Chicago (The Adventures of Tintin, Reporter, in Chicago) began on September 3, 1931, and became Les Aventures de Tintin, reporter, en Amérique (The Adventures of Tintin, Reporter, in America) on the following December 10, whose plates were collected in an album under the title Tintin en Amérique (Tintin in America) when publication ended on October 20, 1932.

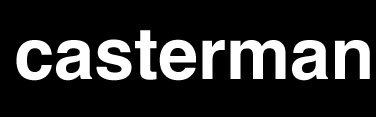
Casterman logo.

In April 1932, Charles Lesne, a former colleague of Le Vingtième Siècle who had become an associate of the director of Casterman Editions in Tournai, contacted Hergé with a proposal to illustrate book covers for the publishing house. (Note: Peeters (2011, pp. 117–118)) At the end of 1933, Charles Lesne proposed that Casterman take over from Le Vingtième Siècle in the printing of his future albums. (Note: Assouline (1996, pp. 123–124)) Negotiations were particularly tough with Norbert Wallez, who saw himself as a sort of co-author of The Adventures of Tintin, and intended to keep his share of the next three albums. (Note: Peeters (2011, pp. 135–138)) Under the terms of his contract with Hergé, the Abbé was responsible for printing the albums, while the artist was in charge of sales, with profits divided equally between them. Norbert Wallez, meanwhile ousted from the weekly's editorial board, finally gave in. (Note: Peeters (2011, pp. 135–138)) In March 1934, a contract was signed between Hergé and Casterman, making Casterman the new publisher of the series. Under the terms of the agreement, royalties amounted to 15%: the artist received three Belgian francs for each copy sold, reduced to two francs for sales of 10,000 copies or more. This agreement was decisive in conquering the French market, (Note: Assouline (1996, pp. 123–124)) (Note: Goddin (2007, p. 198)) where Tintin had been published in the Catholic weekly Cœurs Vaillants since 1930.

Les Cigares du Pharaon, published in Le Petit Vingtième from December 8, 1932, to February 8, 1934, under the title Les Aventures de Tintin en Orient, was the first album published by Casterman in November 1934. (Note: Peeters (2011, p. 139)) In all, the adventure comprises 124 plates, a record for the series. Its publication was accompanied by an interactive game in the form of a column entitled "Notre grande enquête: le mystère Tintin", inviting readers to give their point of view on the case. Le Petit Vingtième's editorial team drew inspiration from the detective novels of Ellery Queen, with challenges to the reader. The operation was a success, with letters pouring in from readers. (Note: Peeters (2011, pp. 129–130))

=== The late 1930s ===
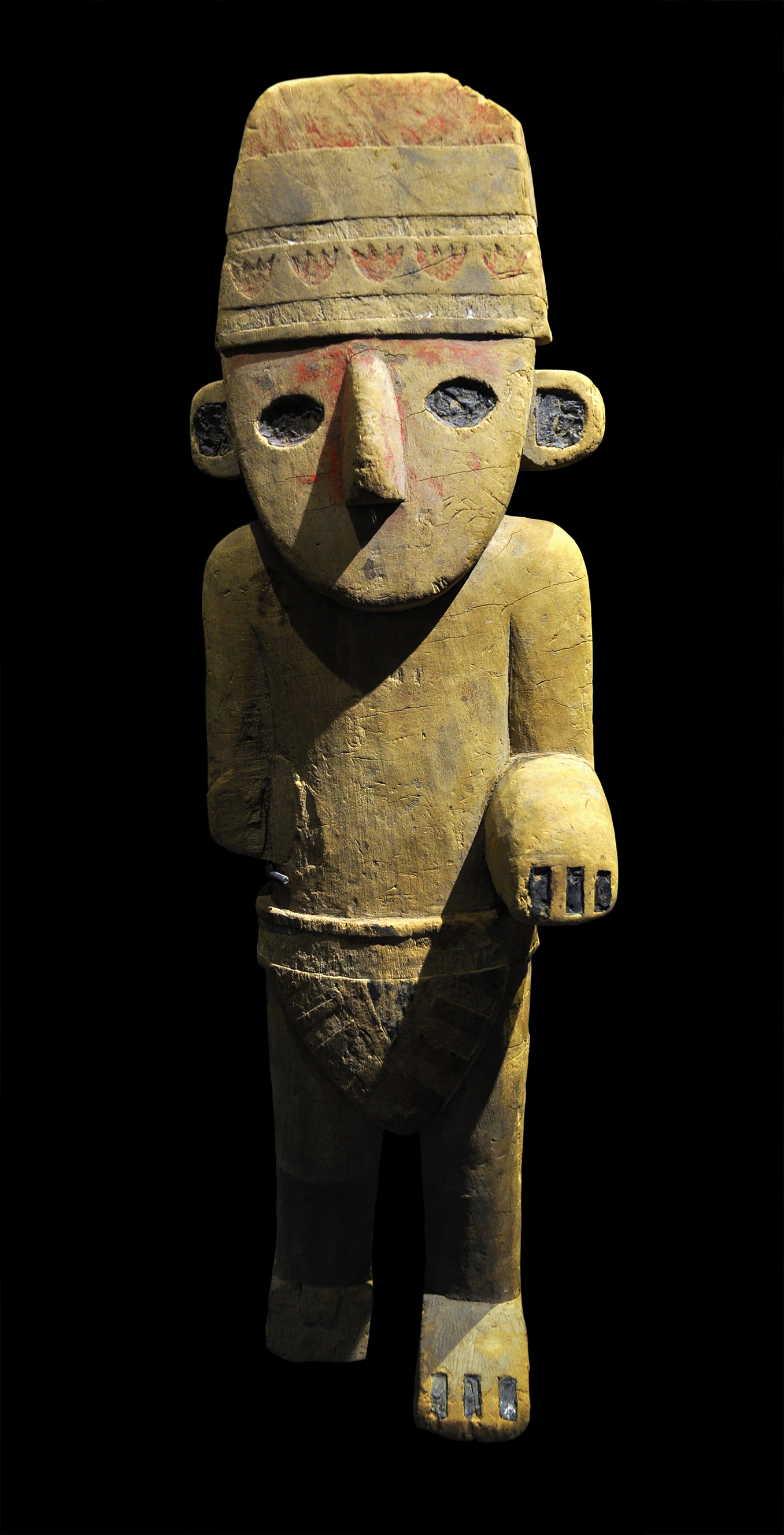
A Chimú statue very similar to the Arumbaya fetish in Broken Ear.

On August 9, 1934, Le Petit Vingtième began publication of Aventures de Tintin en Extrême-Orient, which ended on October 17, 1935, and became Le Lotus bleu when published in album form in October 1936. Limited to 6,000 copies, this album includes five color off-text illustrations. As with the previous adventure, a readers-detectives' mailing list is set up, and for the fourth time, Tintin's return is staged, this time at the Cirque Royal in Brussels.

The following stories were published in the same newspaper, firstly L'Oreille cassée (from December 5, 1935 to February 25, 1937) and L'Île Noire (from April 15, 1937 to June 16, 1938), both under the simple title Nouvelles Aventures de Tintin et Milou, then Le Sceptre d'Ottokar, which appeared under the title Tintin en Syldavie from August 4, 1938. On the following November 17, the editorial staff relaunched the "Tintin Inquiry" column, offering a series of challenges to readers and encouraging them to give their opinion, by mail, on elements of the plot. The adventure ended on August 10, 1939.

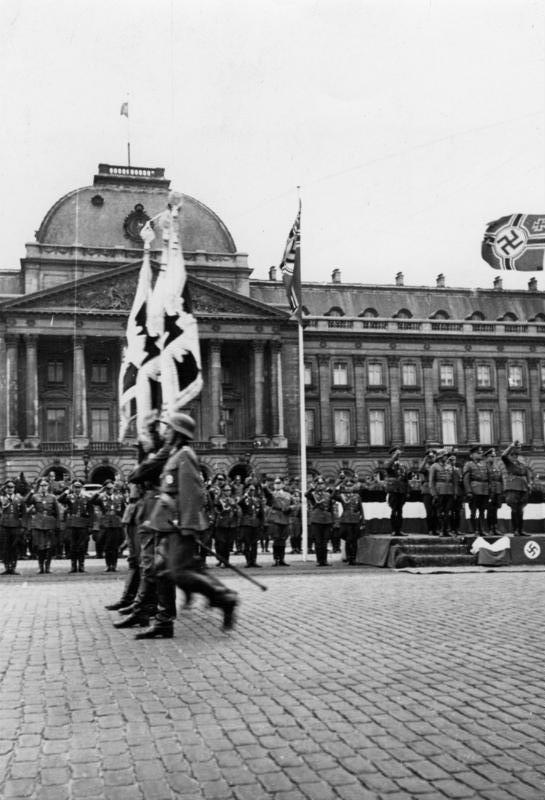
German soldiers march past the Royal Palace in Brussels in July 1940.

The following week, Le Petit Vingtième announced the start of a new adventure: "Soon Tintin... in the land of black gold". However, the launch was delayed: Hergé was mobilized on the 1st of September 1939, following the outbreak of World War II. Temporarily demobilized a few days later, the illustrator got back to work, so that, after announcing the return of Tintin, Le Petit Vingtième published the first plates of this new story on the following October 12. (Note: Peeters (2011, pp. 195–196)) Mobilized again at the end of December 1939, Hergé continued to send drawings from his barracks but was only able to supply one plate a week from the following February. (Note: Peeters (2011, pp. 202–204)) Publication of the adventure was chaotic. Eventually, Hergé was granted two days' leave a week to work on his illustrations, and in April he was allowed to go home for medical reasons, before being declared unfit for service on May 10. On the same day, the German invasion of Belgium interrupted Le Petit Vingtième and, de facto, the adventure. (Note: Peeters (2011, pp. 202–204)) At this stage, only 56 plates had been published.

=== Tintin in Le Soir during the Occupation ===
During the first weeks of the Occupation, many newspapers were sequestered, including Le Vingtième Siècle. On June 30, the daily's management confirmed the notice of dismissal sent earlier to its staff and announced that their contracts would end three months later. (Note: Goddin (2007, pp. 261–262)) (Note: Assouline (1996, p. 235)) From then on, Hergé set about finding new periodicals to publish his creations. He was soon approached by Raymond De Becker, who suggested he create a weekly illustrated magazine for young people, to be distributed by Le Soir. The first issue of Le Soir-Jeunesse appeared on October 17, 1940, and featured a new Tintin adventure, Le Crabe aux pinces d'or (The Crab with the Golden Claws). However, the story did not yet have a title: it was simply published as Les Aventures de Tintin et Milou. (Note: Assouline (1996, p. 247)) For Hergé, joining the editorial staff of Le Soir was a godsend: in addition to the opportunity to develop his creations and secure a regular income, (Note: Assouline (1996, p. 242)) Le Soir's circulation, almost twenty times greater than that of Le Petit Vingtième, considerably increased his readership.

The Adventure of The Crab with the Golden Claws was first published weekly in Le Soir-Jeunesse, but from September 23, 1941, it was published daily: the wartime context led to a shortage of paper, and Le Soir 's management decided to reduce the size of its supplement, before discontinuing it for good. The story was published at the rate of one strip per day, forcing Hergé to rethink his narrative division. However, Hergé was delighted with the new format, which enabled him to make up for the delay caused by the discontinuation of Soir-Jeunesse, publishing an average of 24 drawings per week, compared with 12 previously. (Note: Peeters (2011, pp. 232–234))

After publication, the adventure was published by Casterman in a 100-page album, which also included four full-page color illustrations. Hergé was unhappy with the technical quality of his publisher's work, however, as the colors of both the out-text and the cover did not meet his expectations, but the album was printed before the proofs were submitted to him. On the commercial front, however, the album was a success: the publication of the story in Le Soir offered tremendous publicity for the Adventures of Tintin, so much so that Le Crabe aux pinces d'or and the preceding adventures were reprinted at the beginning of December 1941. (Note: Peeters (2011, p. 234)) Hergé himself lobbied the Office Central du Papier and the German authorities to obtain additional paper to ensure the production of his albums. (Note: Assouline (1996, p. 266)) (Note: Peeters (2011, pp. 232–234))

L'Étoile mystérieuse began appearing in Le Soir on October 20, 1941, just two days after the end of Le Crabe aux pinces d'or. It ran continuously until May 22, 1942, and was followed by Le Secret de La Licorne (June 11, 1942 - January 14, 1943) and Le Trésor de Rackham le Rouge (February 19 - September 23, 1943). In each case, the transition to an album meant that Hergé had to rework the layout of his story to comply with the standard 62-page publication format imposed by Casterman. As a daily strip corresponds to approximately two-thirds of a final album page, several boxes had to be removed: 41 for The Mysterious Star, 15 for The Secret of the Unicorn and 30 for The Treasure of Rackham the Red. Casterman also convinced Hergé to rework and colorize the series' first adventures to adapt them to the new publishing format, which is why the author hired Edgar P. Jacobs as a collaborator in early 1944. (Note: Assouline (1996, pp. 322–323)) Incidentally, L'Étoile mystérieuse was the first album to be published entirely in color.

A new story, Les Sept Boules de cristal, began appearing in Le Soir on December 16, 1943. Its distribution was chaotic: the story was interrupted for the first time between May 6 and July 6, 1944, due to Hergé's depression, then published only every other day between August 8 and the 30th. (Note: Peeters (2011, p. 283)) The entry of the Allied armies into Brussels on September 3, 1944, led to the suspension of the newspaper's activities and, in fact, to a further interruption of Aventures de Tintin. At this stage, 152 strips were published daily, corresponding to around 50 plates of the future album. Four strips remain unpublished, and were only discovered in the late 1990s when they were purchased by the Fondation Hergé.

=== Launch of Journal de Tintin and intermittent publications ===
Publication of the Seven Crystal Balls could not resume for the next two years, as Hergé, like other journalists who had worked under the German occupation, was prevented from continuing his professional activity. (Note: Assouline (1996, p. 336)) Arrested for collaboration, Hergé was finally cleared of all suspicion and obtained the certificate of civism required to return to work. He joined forces with press publisher and resistance fighter Raymond Leblanc to launch a new weekly, Tintin, whose first issue appeared on September 26, 1946, with a print run of 60,000 copies: 40,000 in French and the rest in Dutch under the title Kuifje. Tintin's adventures began with Le Temple du Soleil, but the first plates published under this name in the magazine corresponded to the end of Les Sept Boules de cristal. The last plate in the Seven Crystal Balls album is published on December 19. The story of the Temple of the Sun, which is the continuation of the diptych, doesn't begin until Tintin and Captain Haddock arrive in Peru. (Note: Kursner (2021, pp. 108–110))

The adventure was published as a full-page spread occupying the two centerfolds, in Italian-style format and in full color. (Note: Kursner (2021, pp. 108–110)) Publication was interrupted for several weeks in the summer of 1947, due to Hergé's depression. (Note: Assouline (1996, p. 402)) To lighten the cartoonist's workload, the magazine team decided to publish only two strips of the story each week, the third being replaced by an educational historical chronicle, "Who were the Incas?", written by Jacques Van Melkebeke and illustrated by Guy Dessicy. El Templo del Sol finally came to an end on April 22, 1948. (Note: Kursner (2021, p. 113))

The following September 16, Tintin au pays de l'or noir (Tintin in the Land of Black Gold) began publication in a version adapted from the pre-war unfinished story. Once again, the publication was interrupted several times and continued laboriously until February 23, 1950. This led to tensions between Hergé and the magazine's director, Raymond Leblanc, to the point that the artist considered not renewing his contract with the magazine. (Note: Kursner (2021, pp. 113–116)) On March 30, a new adventure began: On a marché sur la Lune, to be published in two albums, Objectif Lune and On a marché sur la Lune. (Note: Kursner (2021, p. 117)) At the same time, the artist surrounded himself with a team capable of assisting him in various tasks: this was the birth of Studios Hergé on April 6, 1950. However, the story was also interrupted for a long period, between September 7, 1950, and April 9, 1952. It was not completed until December 30, 1953. (Note: Kursner (2021, pp. 135–138))

=== From the 1950s to the 1970s ===
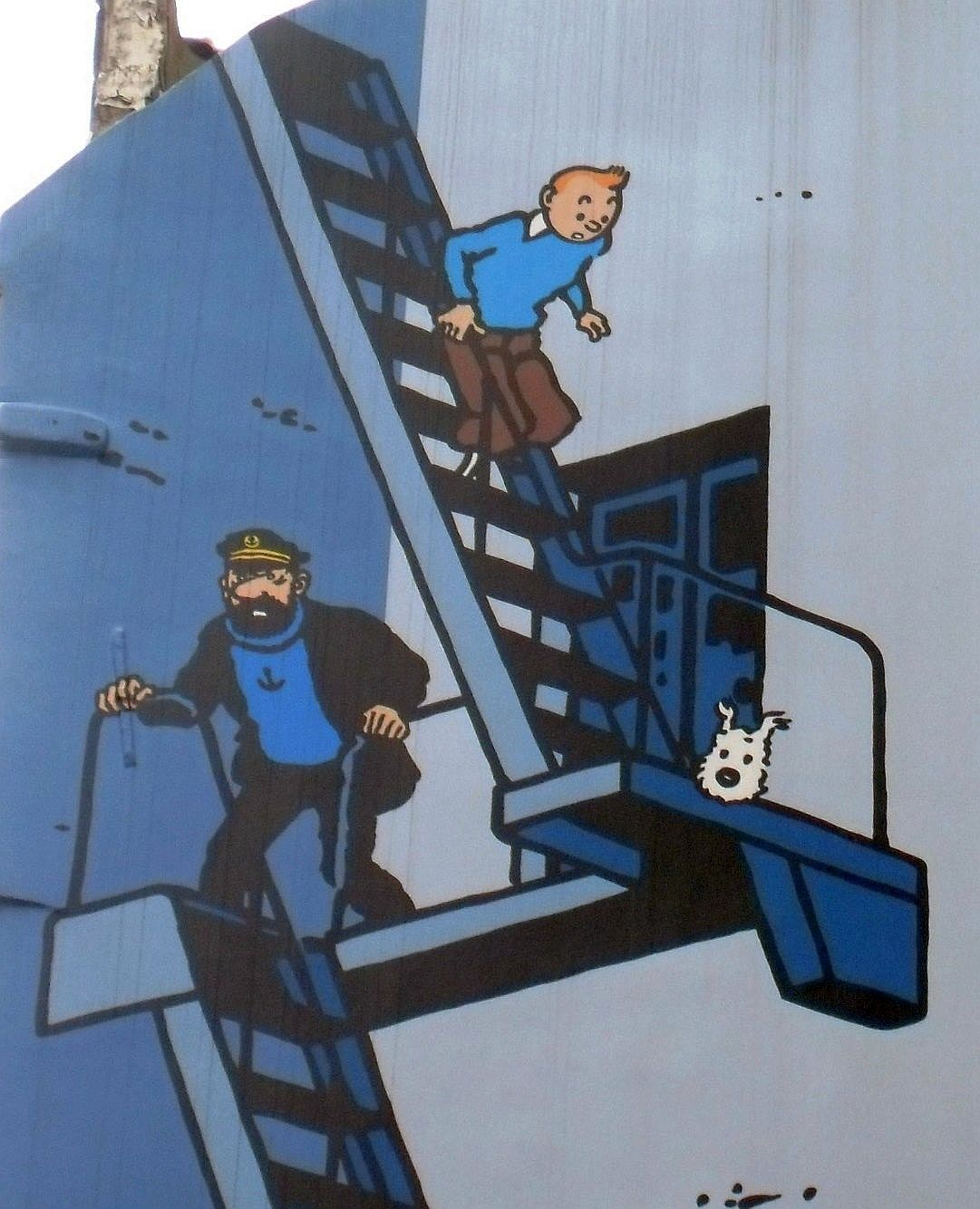
A scene from The Tournesol Affair reproduced on a wall in Brussels.

The following publications were published without interruption: L'Affaire Tournesol (from December 22, 1954 to February 22, 1956), Coke en stock (from October 31, 1956 to January 1, 1958), Tintin au Tibet (from September 17, 1958 to November 25, 1959), then Les Bijoux de la Castafiore (from July 4, 1961 to September 4, 1962), in a period that philosopher Rémi Brague calls the "classicism" of the Aventures de Tintin. Each time, the transition to an album entailed a series of minor corrections to dialogue, settings, and coloring. Four strips of Tintin in Tibet were removed for the album edition, as the original version included 63 plates, one more than the authorized format. (Note: Kursner (2021, pp. 142, 185))

The artist nonetheless slowed down his rate of production. He also responded to a request from the British publisher of the Tintin albums for corrections to be made to the original version of L'Île Noire. It was therefore not a new adventure but a completely redrawn version of an earlier story that began appearing in the pages of Tintin on June 1, 1965. However, neither the layout nor the script were altered. (Note: Kursner (2021, pp. 185–186))

On September 27, 1966, the first plates of Flight 714 to Sydney appeared in a special 100-page edition of Tintin to mark the magazine's twentieth anniversary. The story was completed on November 28, 1967, before undergoing several alterations to the drawings and dialogues for publication the following year. (Note: Kursner (2021, p. 187)) Publication of Hergé's last completed story, Tintin et les Picaros, began on September 16, 1975, with two plates per week, and continued until April 13, 1976. This adventure was only colorized once, whereas the previous ones were first colorized for pre-publication and then again for album publication. The following month, Les Cigares du Pharaon was published in the color version of the 1955 adventure, which had never been serialized in the press. (Note: Kursner (2021, pp. 234–235))

=== The unfinished work ===
Hergé begins work on a new adventure, Tintin et l'Alph-Art, which remains unfinished. After he died in 1983, a controversy arose over the fate of this album. Hergé had stated on several occasions, notably in interviews with Numa Sadoul, that he did not want his hero to outlive him and his work to be continued by someone else, a wish confirmed by his second wife, Fanny Rodwell. The revelation of the existence of this unfinished adventure by Pierre Sterckx in Les Cahiers de la bande dessinée in October 1984 created great expectations among readers. Fanny Rodwell finally decided to publish Hergé's sketches as the artist left them. The documents relating to his work were entrusted to Benoît Peeters, who was asked to transcribe them. The album was finally published by Casterman in October 1986 and met with great success in bookshops. (Note: Peeters (2011, p. 595))

=== Overview ===
The following table gives an overview of the first pre-publication and first album release dates for the various adventures, but does not take into account any interruptions. (Note: Kursner (2021, pp. 529, 535–536))

List of Tintin Adventures
Number	Title	Pre-publication	Newspaper	Album release
1	Tintin in the Land of the Soviets	January 10, 1929 - May 8, 1930	Le Petit Vingtième	1930 (BW), 2017 (color)
2	Tintin in the Congo	June 5, 1930 - June 11, 1931	Le Petit Vingtième	1931 (BW), 1946 (color)
3	Tintin in America	September 3, 1931 - October 20, 1932	Le Petit Vingtième	1932 (BW), 1946 (color)
4	Cigars of the Pharaoh	December 8, 1932 - February 8, 1934	Le Petit Vingtième	1934 (BW), 1955 (color)
5	The Blue Lotus	August 9, 1934 - October 17, 1935	Le Petit Vingtième	1936 (BW), 1946 (color)
6	The Broken Ear	December 5, 1935 - February 25, 1937	Le Petit Vingtième	1937 (BW), 1943 (color)
7	The Black Island	April 15, 1937 - June 16, 1938	Le Petit Vingtième	1938 (BW), 1943 (color)
8	King Ottokar's Sceptre	August 4, 1938 - August 10, 1939	Le Petit Vingtième	1939 (BW), 1947 (color)
9	The Crab with the Golden Claws	October 17, 1940 - October 18, 1941	Le Soir-Jeunesse, Le Soir	1941 (BW), 1944 (color)
10	The Shooting Star	October 20, 1941 - May 22, 1942	Le Soir	1942
11	The Secret of the Unicorn	June 11, 1942 - January 14, 1943	Le Soir	1943
12	Red Rackham's Treasure	February 19 - September 23, 1943	Le Soir	1945
13	The Seven Crystal Balls	December 16, 1943 - September 2, 1944	Le Soir, Tintin	1948
14	Prisoners of the Sun	September 26, 1946 - April 22, 1948	Tintin	1949
15	Land of Black Gold	September 16, 1948 - February 23, 1950	Tintin	1950
16	Destination Moon	March 30 - September 7, 1950 then April 9, 1952 - December 30, 1953	Tintin	1953
17	Explorers on the Moon	March 30 - September 7, 1950 then April 9, 1952 - December 30, 1953	Tintin	1954
18	The Calculus Affair	December 22, 1954 - February 22, 1956	Tintin	1956
19	The Red Sea Sharks	October 31, 1956 - January 1, 1958	Tintin	1958
20	Tintin in Tibet	September 17, 1958 - November 25, 1959	Tintin	1960
21	The Castafiore Emerald	July 4, 1961 - September 4, 1962	Tintin	1963
22	Flight 714 to Sydney	September 27, 1966 - November 28, 1967	Tintin	1968
23	Tintin and the Picaros	September 16, 1975 - April 13, 1976	Tintin	1976
24	Tintin and Alph-Art	none (unfinished story)		1986

== Other publications ==
=== Magazines and periodicals ===
==== Before the Second World War: The Adventures of Tintin in France, Switzerland and Portugal ====
In 1930, Abbot Gaston Courtois, director of the Catholic weekly Cœurs Vaillants, obtained permission to reproduce the Aventures de Tintin for publication in France. Initially, in August 1930, the periodical published a revised version of Le Triomphe de l'Aigle Rouge, a short story written by Harry Mortimer Batten and illustrated by Hergé, which had appeared a few months earlier in Le Petit Vingtième. Publication of the plates for Tintin in the Land of the Soviets began on the following October 26 and continued until February 1932. They were a great success, but an incident occurred: Gaston Courtois, who felt that the speech balloons were insufficient for the reader to understand the story, had recitatives placed under the drawings without informing Hergé. The author intervened to stop these changes. Cœurs vaillants went on to publish all the reporter's adventures, without interruption, until The Secret of the Unicorn in September 1944. (Note: Kursner (2021, pp. 550–551)) In April 1932, the abbot Henri Carlier, director and editor-in-chief of the Geneva-based Catholic weekly L'Écho illustré, obtained the rights to distribute Hergé's works in Switzerland. L'aventure chez les Soviets appeared in the columns of this periodical from September 3, 1932. From then on, L'Écho illustré carried all the adventures, although not necessarily in chronological order. (Note: Kursner (2021, p. 575))

Tintin's first appearance in a non-French-speaking country took place in Portugal on April 16, 1936, with the publication of Aventuras de Tim-Tim na America de Norte, a translation of Tintin in America, in the weekly O Papagaio, edited by Abbé Abel Varzim and journalist Adolfo Simões Müller. The story was colored without Hergé's approval and, above all, for editorial reasons, the distribution of the strips was changed, which greatly displeased the artist. Nevertheless, publication continued, and O Papagaio published the following adventures up to The Secret of the Unicorn in April 1948, except Ottokar 's Sceptre. (Note: Kursner (2021, p. 570)) The Portuguese publisher also reworked the text of the albums he took over. For example, the Portuguese merchant Oliveira da Figueira, who appears in Les Cigares du pharaon, is of Spanish nationality in Os charutos do faraó, the version published in O Papagaio. Similarly, in the daily version, Tintin's journey takes place in Angola, a Portuguese colony, and not in the Congo, although the hero retains the same paternalistic attitude. (Note: Grutman (2020, p. 180))

==== Under the Occupation: first broadcasts in the Flemish press ====
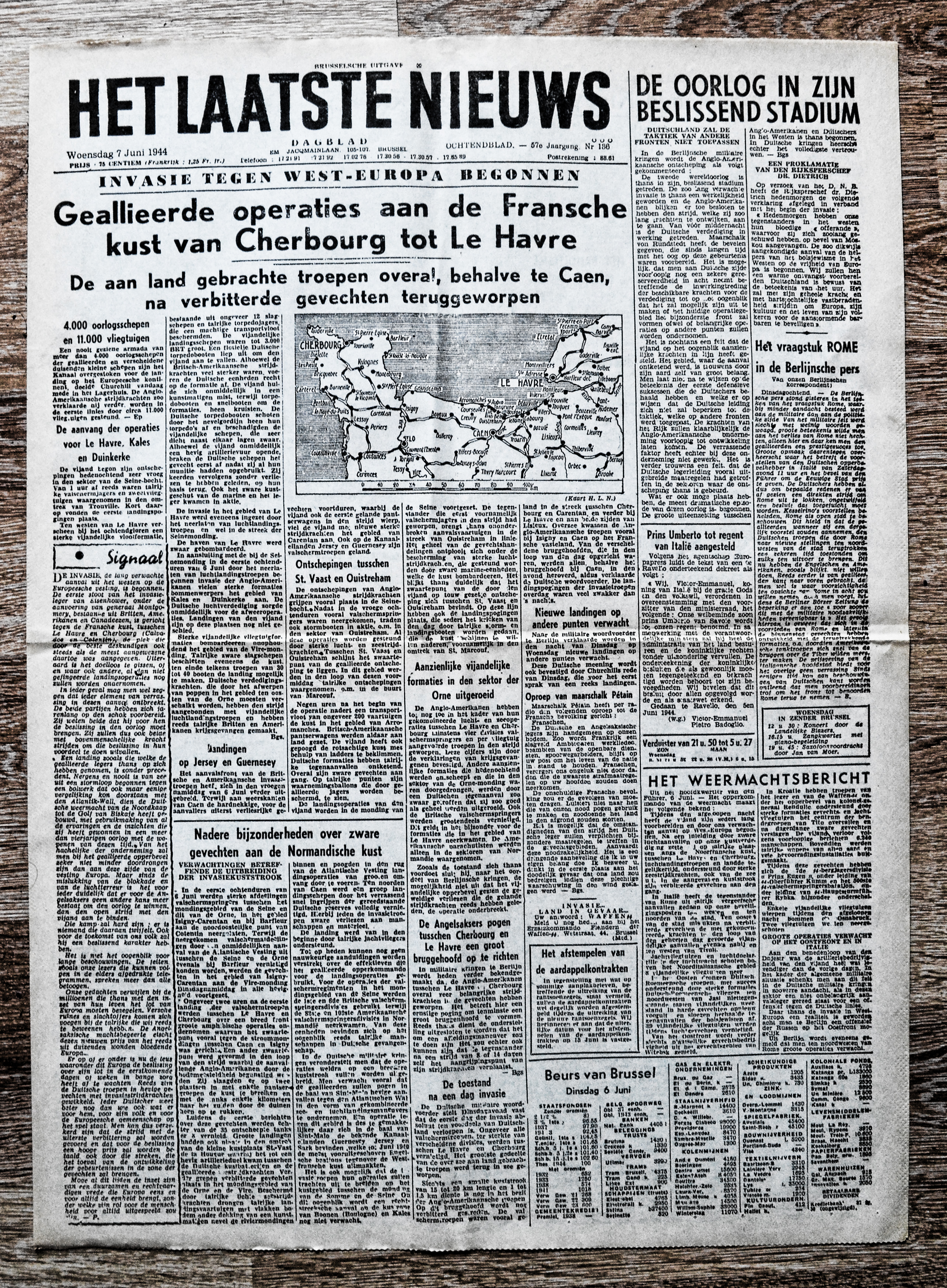
Het Laatste Nieuws (here of June 7, 1944) opens up Tintin to the Flemish readership.

In September 1940, Tintin made its debut in the Dutch-language Belgian press. Hergé's contract with Het Laatste Nieuws enabled him to boost sales since the daily had a large circulation, and to reach Flemish readers for the first time. The translation by the newspaper's editorial staff was, however, at the artist's expense. At first, Tintin in the Congo was published weekly under the title Tintin im Kongo, then Tintin in America. Later, Gespleten Oor (The Broken Ear) and De Geheimzinnige ster (The Mysterious Star) were published at the same time, with the first adventure appearing weekly and the second almost daily. Le Secret de La Licorne was the last adventure published by the Flemish newspaper, which was discontinued on September 2 after the liberation of Belgium. It was a contributor to the paper that renamed Tintin "Kuifje", a name that remained with Flemish readers after the war.

In France, Tintin's adventures continued to be published in Cœurs Vaillants, or its offshoot Belles Histoires de Vaillance, which replaced it in the occupied zone. The stories were also distributed in the French colonies of North Africa through local editions of Cœurs Vaillants. After the Liberation, Hergé's stories were published in successive editions of this periodical, notably Cœurs vaillants en vacances and Message aux Cœurs vaillants. After the paper was suspended in October 1945, the editorial team continued to publish several supplements for the Catholic daily La Voix de l'Ouest.

Another French periodical ensured the distribution of Aventures de Tintin during the Occupation: the Breton newspaper Ololê, founded by Herry Caouissin, published Tintin au pays des Soviets from March 1942.

==== After the Second World War: Tintin in the Nordic press ====
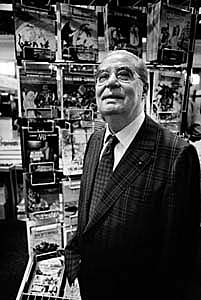
Georges Dargaud helps launch the French version of Tintin magazine.

In France, from May 1946 onwards, Hergé's comic strips left the pages of Tintin et Milou, the supplement to the magazine La Voix de l'Ouest, for those of Cœurs vaillants, renamed Belles histoires de Vaillance. Message to Cœurs vaillants. Les Sept Boules de cristal and Le Temple du Soleil followed one another until January 1949, when Hergé ceased his collaboration with the weekly. In the meantime, Raymond Leblanc, director of Tintin, had signed an agreement with publisher Georges Dargaud to launch the French edition of the magazine, with the first issue appearing on October 28, 1948. (Note: Kursner (2021, pp. 114–116)) However, the cartoonist still wanted to increase the distribution area for his work, and signed new agreements. La Vie catholique illustrée published the Adventures de Tintin from November 1949, starting with L'Étoile mystérieuse. (Note: Kursner (2021, pp. 118–121)) In Switzerland, too, new press titles acquired the rights to distribute the Adventures de Tintin, starting with L'Hirondelle, a children's fortnightly that began distributing TTintin en Amérique in October 1944, but never completed publication.

In addition to the Dutch-language version of Tintin magazine, called Kuifje, Flemish readers in Belgium could discover the reporter's adventures in new titles such as De Nieuwe Gids, which published Le Sceptre d'Ottokar from October 1947 in both its main and local editions. (Note: Kursner (2021, pp. 125–127))

In the years following World War II, Hergé conquered new markets by offering his hero's adventures to newspapers in the Nordic countries. In early 1948, the cartoonist signed an agreement with the Danish company Presse-Illustrations-Bureau (PIB), stipulating that the latter would acquire the rights to distribute his adventures in Scandinavian countries. On June 6, the weekly Tjugofemman (25:an) began distributing Tintin i Kongo in Sweden, and on December 31, the weekly Kong Kylie began publishing the same adventure in Denmark. (Note: Kursner (2021, pp. 128–130)) In Portugal, the Adventures of Tintin left the pages of the weekly O Papagaio in 1948 to join those of Diabrete the following year. (Note: Kursner (2021, pp. 130–131))

In November 1946, the Egyptian weekly Al-Katkout, the youth supplement of the newspaper Bint Al-Nil founded by the feminist philosopher Doria Shafik, began publishing the Adventures of Tintin, probably without authorization. Several Turkish press titles followed suit in the early 1950s. (Note: Kursner (2021, pp. 132–133))

==== From the 1950s to the 1960s: international success ====
In France and Belgium, the number of dailies and regional periodicals carrying the Adventures de Tintin increased sharply in the early 1950s. Hergé and his publisher signed contracts with La Cité, Le Courrier de l'Escaut, La Métropole, La Gazette de Liége, Le Rappel, and Le Journal de Mons et du Borinage, to the extent that Tintin was omnipresent in the French-speaking Belgian press at this time. His adventures also found their way into the pages of several youth supplements, both in the Dutch-speaking part of the country, with Ons Volkske or 't Kapoentje, and in the French-speaking part with Junior (Chez nous). (Note: Kursner (2021, pp. 145–147)) Tintin is also featured in the major Flemish daily De Standaard and the country's only German-language newspaper, Grenz-Echo. (Note: Kursner (2021, pp. 157–159)) Similarly, in France, several large-circulation dailies featured the little reporter's stories, including Le Dauphiné libéré, Les Dernières Nouvelles d'Alsace, L'Est républicain, La Voix du Nord, Le Républicain lorrain, Ouest-France, and Nord Éclair, as well as women's magazines such as Elle, which published Coke en stock exclusively for the French press from September 1957, and Le Petit Écho de la mode, which began publishing Tintin au pays de l'or noir in May 1958, before offering other titles. (Note: Kursner (2021, pp. 149–152))

At the same time, editions of Tintin magazine multiplied. While the Italian version, launched in September 1955, was discontinued after just 25 issues for lack of significant sales, the two Swiss versions, one in German, Tim, and the other in French, Rataplan, met with some success. Yugoslavian and Hungarian editions were also launched, but the Adventures of Tintin were not included, unlike other series such as Blake and Mortimer or Lucky Luke. (Note: Kursner (2021, pp. 141–145))

Hergé's hero found his way into the press in new European countries. In 1951, the British weekly Eagle reprinted Ottokar's Sceptre, (Note: Kursner (2021, pp. 177–178)) but other titles followed in the News Chronicle. (Note: Kursner (2021, p. 212)) In Germany, the Hamburger Abendblatt, a mass-circulation daily, was the first to publish the series in 1952, soon followed by many other German titles. The same was true of the Netherlands: in 1954, the weekly Katholieke Illustratie published its first story, The Secret of the Unicorn, before the Aventures de Tintin spread to other periodicals, such as De Tijd. (Note: Kursner (2021, pp. 159–164)) In the same year, the Austrian newspaper Zeitung der Woche published Le Crabe aux pinces d'or (The Crab with the Golden Claws), but did not publish any further adventures. In 1957, Tintin made his debut in the Spanish press, with the publication of Objectif Lune in the weekly Blanco y Negro. (Note: Kursner (2021, p. 167)) In the Nordic countries, where Tintin was already established, the number of newspapers requesting the rights to distribute his adventures increased sharply. Hergé's hero found a place in many weeklies, but also in high-circulation dailies such as the Danish Politiken. (Note: Kursner (2021, pp. 173–175)) The Irish Times began distributing Hergé's works in 1959.

Tintin was also exported to other continents. Several Quebec newspapers, including Le Progrès de Saguenay, published Tintin au Congo and then Le Sceptre d'Ottokar in the early 1950s. (Note: Kursner (2021, pp. 154–157)) In Brazil, the daily O Estado de S. Paulo published four adventures between 1955 and 1960 in its women's supplement. (Note: Kursner (2021, pp. 181–184)) The Secret of the Unicorn appeared in the American press at a later date: in 1963, The Blade published The Secret of the Unicorn in the United States. Three years later, the children's magazine Children's Digest obtained exclusive rights for this country. (Note: Kursner (2021, p. 217)) In the Belgian colonies, the Adventures of Tintin were published in many publications, including La Croix du Congo, founded by the Secrétariat d'Action Catholique et Sociale in the Belgian Congo, and Temps nouveaux d'Afrique, a weekly run by missionaries in the Ruanda-Urundi protectorate. The Iranian weekly Ettela'at-e-Koudak offered an adaptation of Tintin in the Congo under the title Le Voyage de Behrouz en Afrique from September 1957, while the following year, the Thai newspaper Viratham, also published weekly, offered a first adventure, L'Oreille Cassée.

In the 1960s, new editions of Tintin magazine were published in Scandinavia, Greece, Turkey, Brazil, Canada, Spain, and Portugal, although some versions were short-lived, such as the Mexican edition, which ran for just three issues. (Note: Kursner (2021, pp. 188–194))

Over the years, Hergé and Casterman continued to develop the series. In 1961, the Egyptian magazine Samir acquired the rights to Tintin, which it also distributed in Sudan, Iraq, Kuwait and Yemen; in 1962, L'Essor du Katanga published Le Sceptre d'Ottokar in this small state; in 1963, the Catholic magazine Sanjivan began distributing Tintin in Tibet in India; the daily Amigoe di Curaçao published four adventures between 1964 and 1966 in Curaçao; in 1965, The Canberra Times introduced Australian children to the adventures of Tintin; the Venezuelan weekly Momento reproduced the lunar diptych in 1966 and 1967 and La Vie Catholique; finally, a Mauritian weekly distributed two adventures between 1969 and 1971. (Note: Kursner (2021, pp. 219–233))

===== Since the 1970s =====
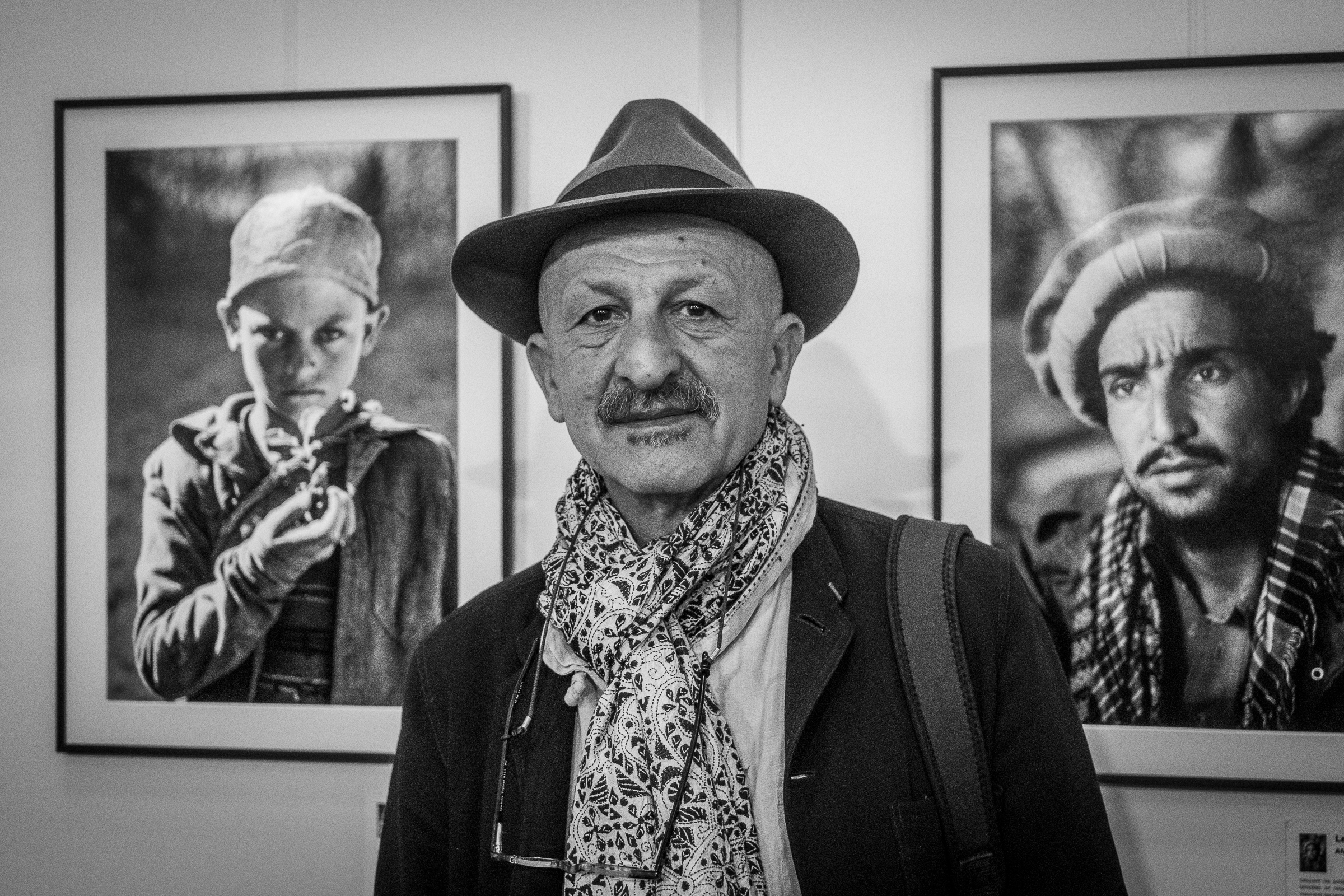
Reza Deghati contributes to the distribution of Tintin in Afghanistan.

In the 1970s, publication of the Adventures of Tintin was no longer confined to national or regional newspapers, whether Catholic or specifically aimed at young people. In France, Agri Sept, a weekly devoted to the world of agriculture, published eight adventures of the famous reporter between 1970 and 1982. (Note: Kursner (2021, p. 238)) In Germany, as in Sweden, Hergé's works were featured in television magazines, at a time when the cartoons produced by Belvision were being broadcast internationally. In Sweden, TV2 broadcast two episodes of Belvision's animated series between 1969 and 1970, at the same time as the weekly TV magazine TV-Tidningen published the stories on which these adaptations were based. (Note: Kursner (2021, pp. 244–246))

Tintin made his first appearance in the Icelandic press in 1974 in the weekly Vikan, and the following year in Morgunblaðið, the country's leading daily. (Note: Kursner (2021, p. 254)) In Argentina, although Tintin albums have been available since they were marketed by Librecol in the early 1960s, no adventures had yet appeared in the press. The weekly Billiken finally published six adventures between 1972 and 1975. In Chile, the children's magazine Mampato published a single title, L'Île Noire, in 1977. (Note: Kursner (2021, pp. 256–258)) The first regional-language translation of Tintin appeared in the early 1980s: Les Pinderleots de l'Castafiore, a version in Picard Tournaisien produced by Lucien Jardez to mark Casterman's bicentenary, was published in Le Courrier de l'Escaut between October and December 1980. (Note: Kursner (2021, pp. 237–238))

After Hergé died in 1983, Tintin comics continued to appear regularly in the press around the world, sometimes on the occasion of very specific events. In 1989, the magazine Tintin reporter reprinted On a marché sur la Lune to celebrate the twentieth anniversary of the success of the Apollo 11 mission. However, the series was interrupted by the magazine's demise. Ten years later, the French magazine Télé Poche reprinted the same story to celebrate the thirtieth anniversary of the event, as well as Tintin's 70th birthday. In 1994, the daily De Standaard reprinted Tintin in Tibet, to coincide with the "Au Tibet avec Tintin" exhibition at the Musée Art et Histoire in Brussels. (Note: Kursner (2021, pp. 262–263))

Tintin continues to appear in new territories. Between 1990 and 2005, the Serbian magazine Politikin Zabavnik published twenty-two adventures from the series, including a translation of The Black Island into Romani in 2004. In 2002, The Blue Lotus appeared in the Chinese children's magazine Zhongguo shao nian bao. The same year, the Afghan newspaper Parvaz, launched by photojournalist Reza Deghati, published the same album in Dari and Pashto. In 2003, Les Nouvelles de Tahiti published a Tahitian version of The Crab with the Golden Claws. (Note: Kursner (2021, pp. 264–268))

===== Short and feature-length adaptations in the press =====
Les Aventures de Tintin have undergone numerous adaptations for film and television, most of which were subsequently serialized in the international press. (Note: Kursner (2021, p. 269)) The series Les Aventures de Tintin, d'après Hergé, produced by the Belvision company in the early 1960s, was serialized in the French weekly Télé 7 Jours in 1966. A summary of each episode is accompanied by a dozen illustrations. (Note: Kursner (2021, p. 271)) The live-action films Tintin et le Mystère de la Toison d'or (1961) and Tintin et les Oranges bleues (1964) were also adapted for the press: the first appeared in 1962 in the fortnightly Le Film illustré and in the magazine Télérama, in the form of a short story illustrated with stills from the film, while the second appeared in the same form in La Vie catholique illustrated in 1965. Both features were also adapted for the Egyptian weekly Samir and the Turkish magazine Milliyet Çocuk. (Note: Kursner (2021, pp. 272–276))

A comic strip adaptation of the 1969 animated film Tintin et le Temple du Soleil appeared in Tintin magazine between October 14, 1969, and February 10, 1970, in the form of eighteen panels of six drawings from the film. This adapted story was published in several foreign periodicals: in Belgium in Ons Volkske Junior, in Switzerland in L'Echo illustré, in Egypt in Samir, in Spain in L'infantil Tretzevents, and in Finland in Zoom. (Note: Kursner (2021, pp. 277–278))

This was also the case for another animated film, Tintin et le Lac aux requins, a black-and-white version drawn by Bob de Moor appearing simultaneously in France-Soir between November 1972 and January 1973, and in Belgium in Le Soir, Het Nieuwsblad and De Standaard. This version was reprinted in Denmark in Politiken and in Germany in Abendpost Nachtausgabe, before being colorized in Denmark for Zack magazine and in the Netherlands for Pep and Televizier magazines. A third version, using sets taken directly from the feature film, was reproduced between December 1972 and February 1973 in the Belgian edition of Tintin, then in several of its foreign editions, including those in France, Switzerland, Egypt and Portugal. It also appeared in the Flemish weekly Ons Volkske Junior, and the Scandinavian magazine's Tempo (Norway), Champion (Sweden), and Fart og temp (Denmark), as well as in Zoom (Finland) and Milliyet Çocuk (Turkey). (Note: Kursner (2021, pp. 278–280))

=== Albums ===
==== Reissue ====
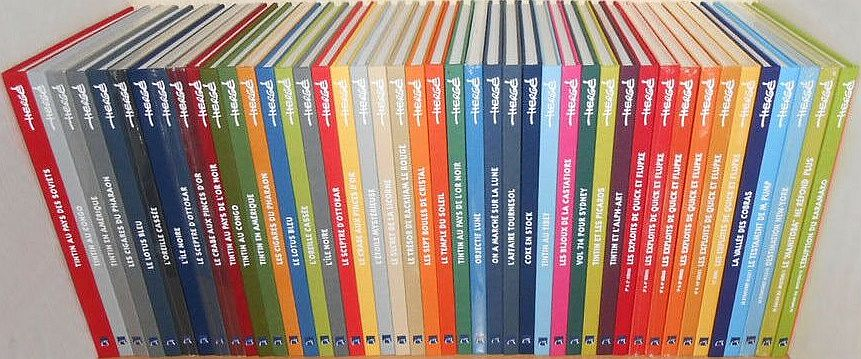
A complete series of works by Hergé, including his other comic series alongside the Adventures of Tintin.

While all the albums have been reprinted many times, Tintin in the Land of the Soviets is a special case. When Hergé began reworking the first adventures after World War II, he categorically refused to rework this first story, as he considered it a youthful error and as it would involve a huge amount of work to establish reliable documentation and rework all the drawings. However, many readers were clamoring for this adventure to be reissued, especially as the original album, published in a small number of copies in 1930, was nowhere to be found. Counterfeits began to appear, and the album sold at a high price on the black market. Although the artist agreed to publish his work without the slightest alteration, it was his publisher who finally objected. In September 1969, 500 copies of a reproduction of the album produced by Studios Hergé were offered to friends of the author. (Note: Assouline (1996, pp. 618–620))

In 1973, Tintin in the Land of the Soviets was finally published in the first volume of the Archives Hergé, which also included Tintin in the Congo, Tintin in America, and Les Aventures de Totor, C. P. desHannetons. (Note: Assouline (1996, p. 623)) In 1981, a facsimile was produced, selling 100,000 copies in just three months. In 1999, for Tintin's 70th anniversary, Casterman, with the authorization of the Fondation Hergé, reissued the album in the same form as the other albums in the series, a decision that went against the author's wishes. In 2017, a colorized version of the album - without any reworking of the drawing - was finally published.

This was the first in a series initiated by Moulinsart. In 2019, the original version of Tintin au Congo was restored and colorized, first in a digital version available only on App Store and Google Play, then in a portfolio box set with a print run of just 3,000 copies, published by Moulinsart due to a lack of agreement with Casterman. This is also the case for Tintin in America in 2020. In 2022, a colorized version of the fourth adventure published in black and white, Les Cigares du Pharaon, was reissued jointly by Moulinsart and Casterman.

For the 75th anniversary of Tintin in 2004, Casterman and the Hergé Foundation published a new, revised edition of Tintin et l'Alph-Art, an album now integrated with the rest of the series. The first print run was 500,000 copies, while the 1986 album has since been sold out. As this adventure is unfinished, it has given rise to numerous reworkings and adaptations not authorized by Hergé's successors, such as that of a cartoonist who completed the adventure under the pseudonym "Ramo Nash" in 1988, or that of Canadian cartoonist Yves Rodier in 1991.

In 2008, Casterman published a 1,693-page volume entitled Tout Tintin, featuring all twenty-four albums in the series. From 2010, the Les Archives Tintin collection, directed by Jean-Marie Embs and Philippe Mellot with the collaboration of Philippe Goddin, and co-published by Moulinsart and Casterman, offers a deluxe edition of each adventure, album by album. Each volume is accompanied by a 60-page documentation that places the adventure in its historical context, reveals Hergé's creative secrets, describes the characters, and highlights the differences between the various published versions. Distributed by Éditions Atlas.

==== Facsimiles ====
Casterman began printing facsimiles of the original editions in 1981, with the release of Tintin in the Land of the Soviets. Subsequent titles, in their original black-and-white versions, came out shortly afterward. It was in 1996 that Étienne Pollet, who had approached Hergé with a proposal to publish a facsimile of Tintin in the Land of the Soviets twenty years earlier, decided to reproduce the original color editions, starting with The Black Island, since this title had a completely different version before its modernization in 1966. Tintin au Pays de l'Or Noir followed in 2000, as this adventure, too, had significant differences from the current edition. The rest of the titles followed at a steady pace (three facsimiles a year, according to Casterman), ending in 2007 with Tintin et Les Picaros. These reproductions sell at a standard price of 20 euros each.

Tintinophiles have praised Casterman, and Étienne Pollet in particular, for their craftsmanship: in fact, they had to retouch the actual plates, usually by computer, to bring them into line with the original editions, the original plates having been destroyed by Casterman on each reissue to prevent the gummed-up typo from being reproduced. However, this did not prevent some gross errors, many of which remain uncorrected to this day. Note, for example, the first printing of the facsimile of L'Île Noire, with the title "LES AVENTURES DE TINTIN" on two lines, and not on one, as in the original version. But the list is not short, as some facsimiles, The Secret of the Unicorn in particular, contain several quite recognizable errors (corrected spelling mistakes, rewritten texts, drawing modifications, etc.). Apart from the typo in the first print run of L'Île Noire, almost no interior errors were corrected, despite the complaints of Tintinophiles.

==== Translations ====
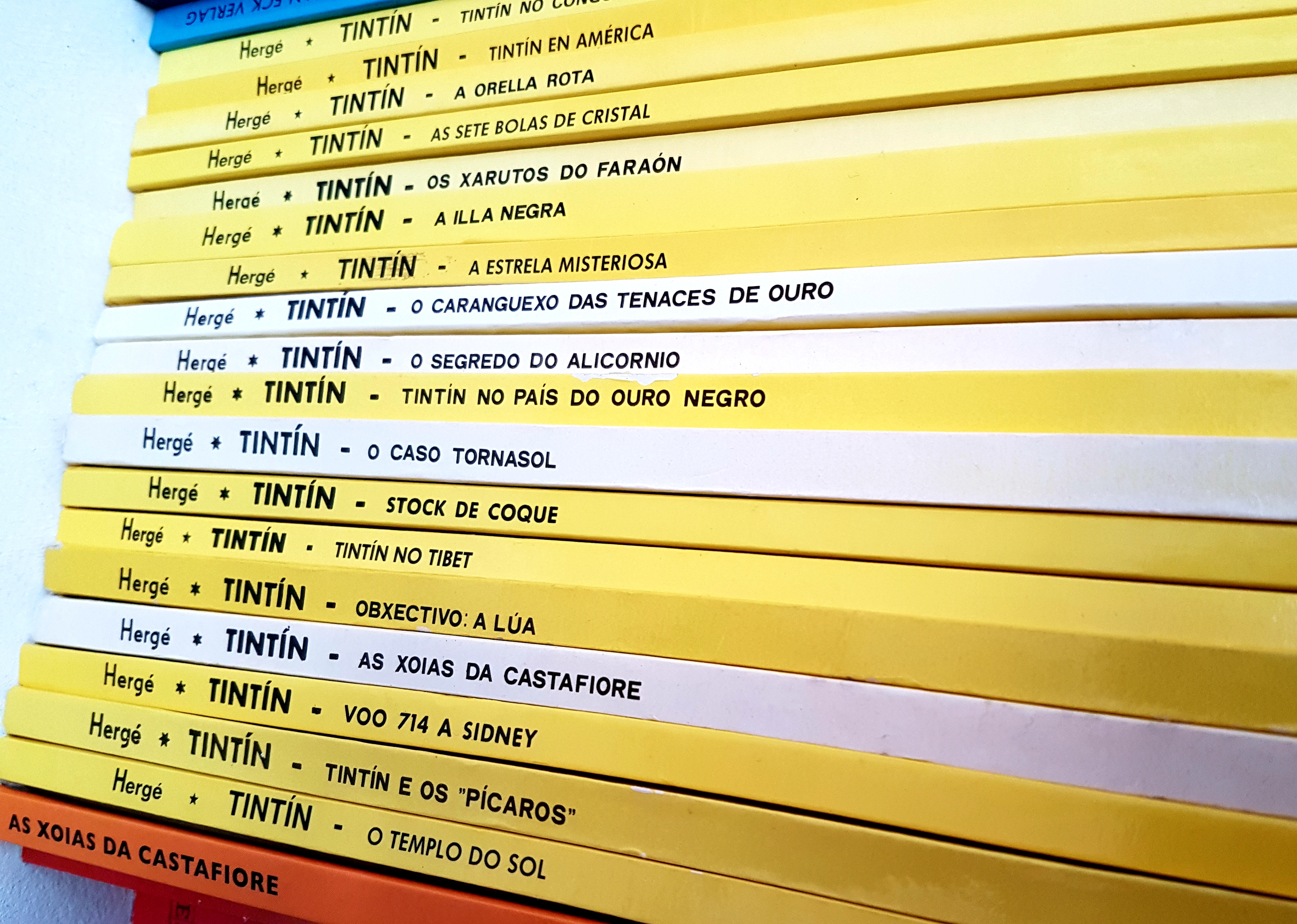
Tintin albums translated into Galician.

Until World War II, the Tintin albums were published exclusively in French, but in 1946 the first Dutch translation was offered by Casterman for the Flemish readership in Belgium and the Netherlands. Judging that the translations produced by Marc Belloy for the serialization of Les Aventures de Tintin in Het Laatste Nieuws from September 1940 were too regional, with the insertion of resolutely Flemish expressions and turns of phrase, the publisher called on François van der Drift, a Dutchman, to prepare new translations. (Note: Grutman (2020, p. 179)) L'Oreille cassée, L'Île Noire and Le Secret de La Licorne were the first adventures concerned. Between 1946 and 1947, all the color albums already published in French were published, and from then on, all new albums appeared simultaneously in French and Dutch.

In 1952, the albums were translated into German, English, and Spanish, starting with the diptych formed by The Secret of the Unicorn and The Treasure of Rackham the Red. These editions met with little success, and only the German translations continued, for a total of twelve titles in 1963.

From the end of the 1950s, Casterman signed agreements with several foreign partners: in 1958, Methuen published several albums in the UK, as did Juventud in Spain. In addition to the Castilian version, Juventud published a Catalan translation by Joaquim Ventalló i Vergés from 1964 onwards. (Note: Grutman (2020, p. 185)) According to Rainier Grutman, the quality of the printing and the care taken in the presentation of the albums by this publishing house explain the widespread success of The Adventures of Tintin in Spain, with sales increasing considerably during the 1980s. By 2005, cumulative sales had reached 5.5 million copies in Castilian and 1.3 million in Catalan, a considerable figure given the nearly 4 million native speakers of the language.

In the United Kingdom, the albums published by Methuen were also successful. The translation, carried out by two of the company's employees, Leslie Lonsdale-Cooper and Michael Turner, was well received by the trade press, including the renowned Times Literary Supplement. This translation was then used by the American periodical Children's Digest, which serialized the Adventures of Tintin in the United States from 1966 onwards. (Note: Grutman (2020, p. 187))

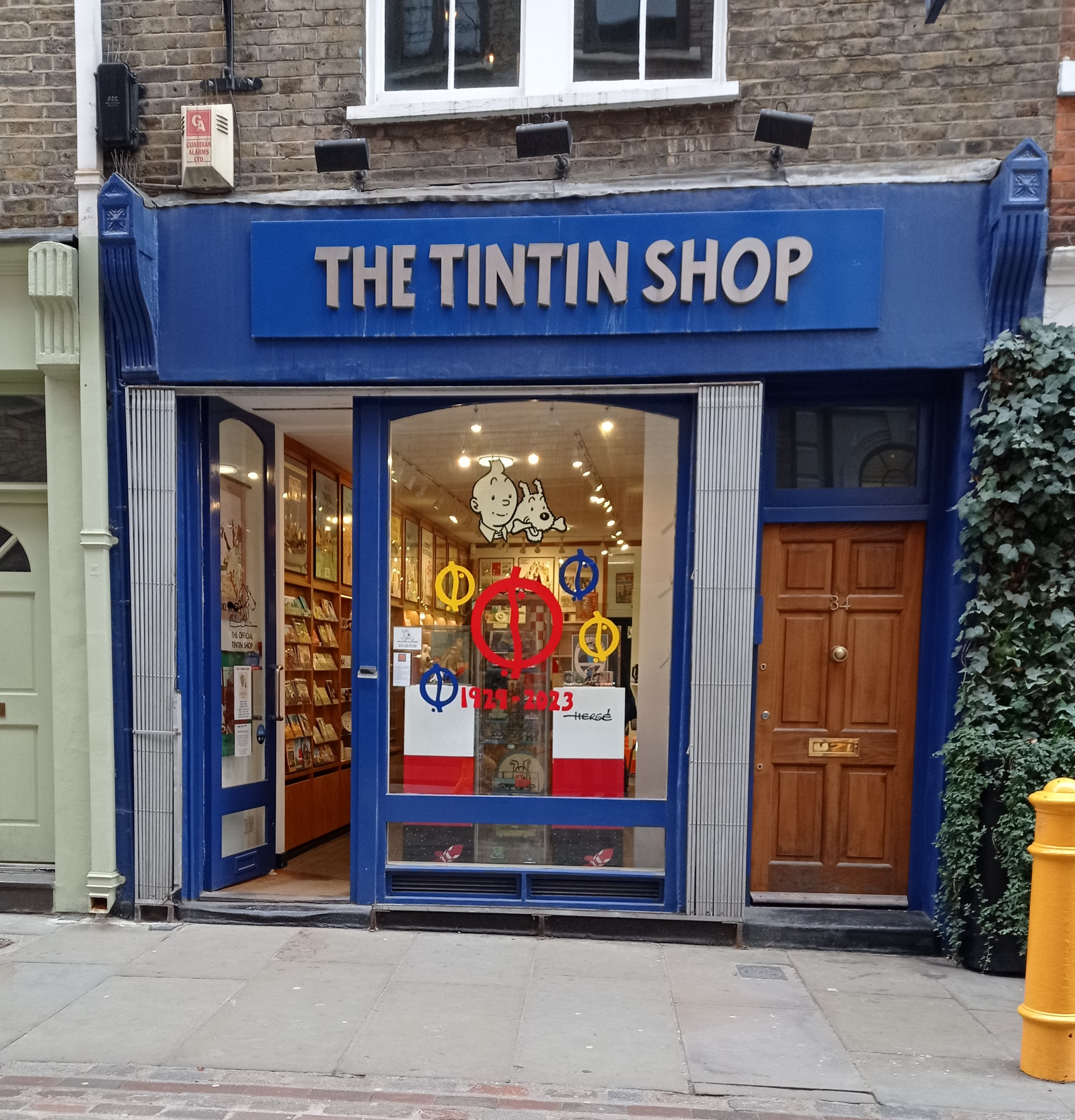
Tintin” stores, like the one in London, bear witness to the hero's international success.

In 1959, on the initiative of Georges Duplaix, a French expatriate writer who had turned to publishing for young people, four albums were published there. Published by Golden Press, the albums were widely advertised: ads appeared in The New York Times, while the Sabena airline offered copies on its long-haul flights between Brussels and New York. (Note: Grutman (2020, p. 186)) Sales remained low, however, and only two further albums were published. From 1960, the Adventures of Tintin were distributed in Sweden by Bonniers förlag and in Denmark by Illustrations Forlaget. In 1961, WSOY took over distribution in Finland, as did Editions Flamboyant in Brazil. The success of these translations was still relative, and some publishers soon abandoned their production.

In the late 1960s, the international distribution of Les Aventures de Tintin took off: new translations appeared in Italian, Greek and Norwegian, as well as Arabic (Egypt and Lebanon), Afrikaans, Malay, Indonesian, Iranian, and Hebrew. From then on, translations multiplied, including into regional languages, with translations into Basque and Breton. in the 1970s, followed by Les Bijoux de la Castafiore in Picard Tournaisien in 1980. Pirated editions of Les Aventures de Tintin also appeared, mainly in East Asia and Turkey, but the phenomenon became marginal after Casterman concluded numerous agreements with the various publishers to regularize their situation.

In 2001, the Mandarin translation of Tintin in Tibet sparked controversy: the title chosen by the publisher, "Tintin in Chinese Tibet", provoked strong protests from Fanny Rodwell, who threatened to cease all collaboration with the Chinese publisher. 10,000 copies were printed before the album was finally withdrawn from circulation and reissued under its original title.

In 2014, the 100-translation mark was passed, a figure that is constantly rising, with over 120 languages and dialects by 2019. In 2020, Hergé ranked eighth among the world's most translated French-speaking writers. (Note: Grutman (2020, p. 177)) Rainier Grutman maintains that this number of translations should be put into perspective: on the one hand, the fact that an album has been translated at a given time does not imply that this edition is still available years later; on the other hand, not all albums are translated into all languages. In 2020, with editions in 26 languages, The Blue Lotus is the most translated album in the series. (Note: Grutman (2020, p. 189))

Most translations into regional languages are carried out by cultural associations, which finance and promote the album with the backing of Casterman. Breton translations are particularly numerous: in 2017, after the publication of Tintin en Amerika, only two titles in the collection still have no translation in this language, namely Tintin au Congo and Tintin et les Picaros. In addition, some albums are translated into languages or dialects of the regions where part of the action takes place. In 2007, to mark the centenary of Hergé's birth, L'Affaire Tournesol was translated into Arpitan and Gruyère dialect.

Character names are also translated or adapted according to language, as are Captain Haddock's swear words, both for reasons of pronunciation and to preserve the humorous aspect of the names.

In 2019, publisher Casterman announced that over 250 million albums had been sold worldwide since the creation of Les Aventures de Tintin 90 years earlier, making it one of the best-selling comic book series, second only to Asterix and Lucky Luke. At that time, according to figures provided by the publisher, four million copies were sold each year, mainly in China, while sales in France remained steady at around 500,000 albums. Tintin en Amérique, Tintin au Congo, and Le Lotus bleu are the best-selling albums since the creation of the series.

==== Pirate editions ====
In many countries, mainly in Asia, publishers have offered translations of the various albums without the agreement of Hergé or Casterman. This is the case in Vietnam, where the first albums were published between 1989 and 1996, then others by the company Nhà Xuat Ban Tahnh Nien (Fahasa) between 1997 and 1999. These pirate versions are the only available translations of Tintin in Vietnamese, as Casterman has not yet made this country a commercial target. In other countries, official translations have finally succeeded the pirate versions. The first translation of an album into Chinese was carried out in 1980 by a Taiwanese publisher. It was a version of old Chinese characters, not the simplified ones then used in China. The following year, a translation of L'Île Noire was made available in Canton, and from then on, pirate editions proliferated throughout the country. Their number diminished after China joined the Berne Convention in 1992 before the situation was regularized in 2001, with the official publication of 22 large-format albums.

In Turkey, where the Les Aventures de Tintin has been known since the 1950s, the first editions of albums were published without agreement, as were the first appearances in periodicals, before their situation was regularized by the signing of various contracts. In Iran, editions followed the opposite path: officially published in the 1970s, Les Aventures de Tintin were banned from distribution after the Iranian revolution of 1979, giving rise to unofficial editions. Jacques Bonnaric, a specialist in Hergé's work, has identified many pirate editions, including a Bulgarian version of Le Crabe aux pinces d'or with a print run of just 250 copies.

==== List of languages ====
This section lists the foreign and regional languages for which translations of at least one Les Aventures de Tintin album are available. The date in brackets indicates the first year of publication.

- Official languages:

Afrikaans (1973) - Albanian (2014) - German (1952) - American English (1959) - British English (1952) - Arabic (1972) - Armenian (2006) - Bengali (1975) - Bulgarian - Catalan (1964) - Korean (1977) - Danish (1960) - Spanish (1952) - Esperanto (1981) - Estonian (2008) - Finnish (1961) - Greek (1968) - Hebrew (1964) - Hindi (2010) - Hungarian (1989) - Indonesian (1975) - Icelandic (1971) - Italian (1961) - Japanese (1968) - Khmer (2001) - Latin (1987) - Latvian (2006) - Lithuanian (2007) - Luxemburgish (1987) - Malay (1975) - Mandarin (2001) - Mongolian (2006) - Dutch (1946) - Norwegian (1972) - Persian (1971) - Polish (1994) - Portuguese (1936) - Brazilian Portuguese (1961) - Romansh (1986) - Romanian (1986) - Russian (1993) - Serbo-Croatian (1974) - Sinhala (1998) - Slovak (1994) - Slovenian (2003) - Swedish (1960) - Czech (1994) - Tibetan (1994) - Thai (1993) - Turkish (1962) - Wolof (2012).

- Regional languages:

Aclot (2005) - Algherese (1995) - Swiss German (1989) - Alsatian (1992) - Antwerp (2008) - Arpitan (2007) - Asturian (1988) - Basque (1972) - Borain (2009) - Burgundian (2008) - Franco-Provençal (2006) - Breton (1979) - Brusselian (2004) - Cantonese (2004) - Corsican (1994) - Antillean Creole (2009) - Mauritian Creole (2009) - Reunionese Creole (2008) - Dauphinois (Matheysien) (2012) - Faroese (1987) - Frisian (1981) - Gaelic (1993) - Galician (1983) - Gallo (1993) - Welsh (1978) - Gaumais (2001) - Gruerian (2007) - Hasselts (2009) (Note: Grutman (2020, p. 190)) - Hessian (2013) - Monegasque (2010) - Occitan (1979) - Ostendais (2007) - Picard (Tournai, 1980) - Picard (Vimeu-Ponthieu, 2007) - Picard (Hollain, 2013) - Papiamento (2008) - Provençal (2004) - Québécois (2009) - Saintongeais (2013) - Sarthois (2016) - Tahitian (2003) - Twents (2006) - Vosgien (2008) - Walloon (Charleroi, 2008) - Walloon (Liège, 2007) - Walloon (Namur, 2009) - Walloon (Ottignies, 2006).

== Corrections, edits and modifications made ==
=== Changes with Hergé's approval ===
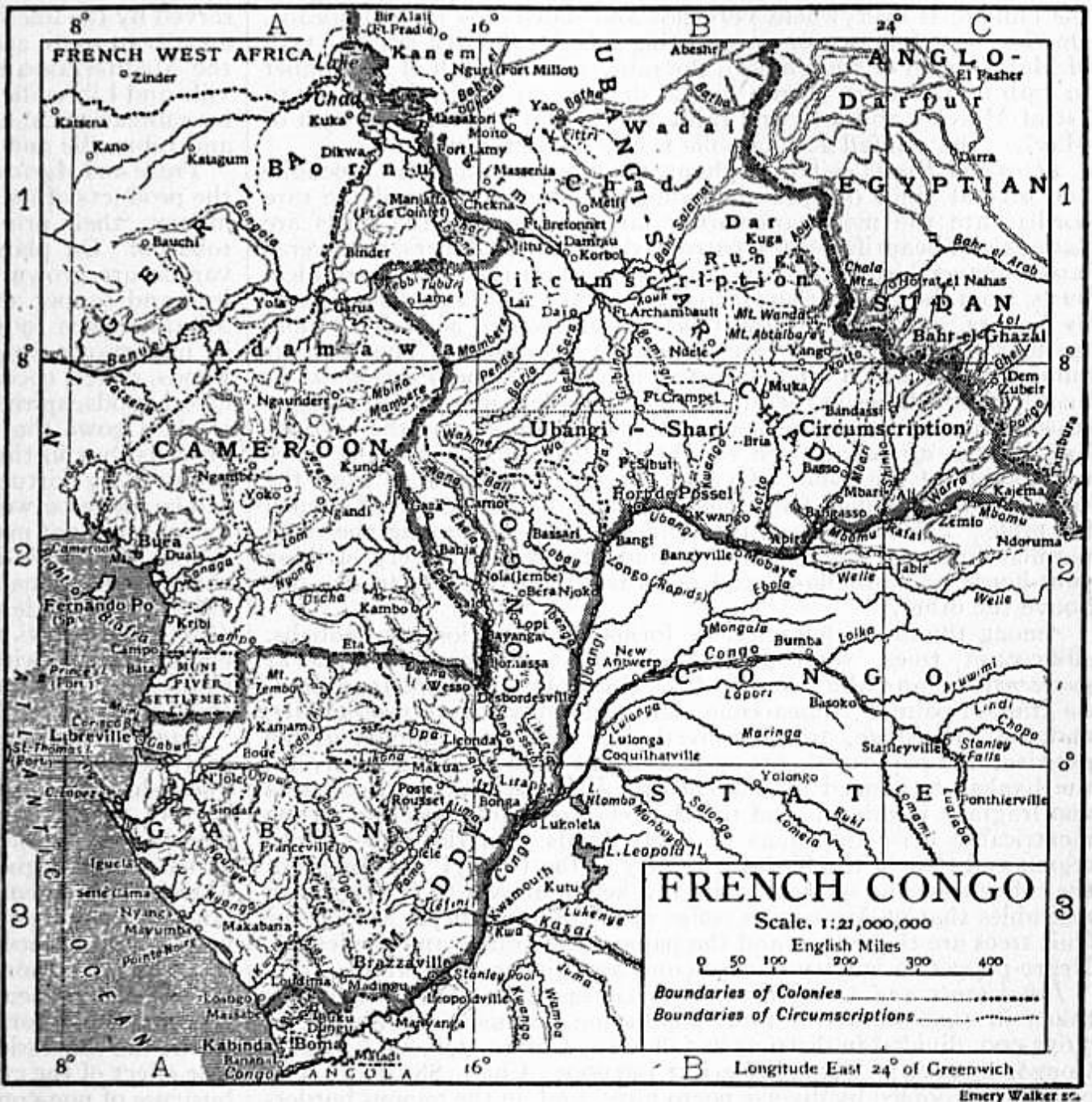
Tintin's travel route to the French Congo in alternative French Cœurs Vaillants publication.

For commercial or editorial reasons, some periodicals modified Hergé's original texts or drawings. In 1932, the editors of Cœurs vaillants, who wanted to avoid publishing the scene where Tintin plays the schoolmaster in Tintin in the Congo, asked the illustrator to create a box to tie in with the rest of the story. In this version, a missionary informs Tintin that an elephant hunt will be organized in his honor the following day, which arouses the reporter's enthusiasm. A few years later, for L'Oreille cassée, Hergé produced another exclusive box for the French periodical, at the request of its director Gaston Courtois: the imps who carry off the bandits Ramon Bada and Alonzo Perez were removed, leaving an image of Tintin sighing: "Dieu ait leur âme" ("God rest their souls"). (Note: Kursner (2021, pp. 385–388)) In 1968, this same box was modified when the adventure was published in Afrique chrétienne. Father Joseph Lannoy, the periodical's editor, feared a negative reaction from his readers, as the angels were depicted in white and the devils in black. So Hergé slightly modified his drawing, whitening the devils himself and leaving them in simple black breeches.

On another level, the illustrator accepts that the titles of his stories and the names of his characters be changed to fit in with the local context and to promote the distribution of his work abroad. In the same way that Tintin is presented as a reporter for Le Petit Vingtième in Belgium, Cœurs Vaillants makes him a member of its editorial staff, which gives rise to a few adjustments: for example, in Tintin au Congo, the hero departs for Africa from the port of Bordeaux, and between his adventures he makes Paris his home. The second foreign periodical to publish les Aventures de Tintin, L'Écho illustré, did the same: in Tintin in the Land of the Soviets, the hero was presented as a Belgian reporter working for the magazine, then in subsequent adventures as a Swiss journalist, so that in Switzerland as in France, his adventures appeared in "renationalized" versions. In Tintin au Congo, Belgium and the Belgian Congo become France and the French Congo in Cœurs vaillants, and Portugal and Angola in O Papagaio.

Some periodicals changed the original titles of the stories they published. In Switzerland, until the early 1950s, L'Écho illustré regularly inserted the hero's name in the title. Thus, Le Crabe aux pinces d'or became Tintin au Maroc and L'Étoile mystérieuse became Tintin en Arctique. Other periodicals followed suit, such as the Swedish weekly Tjugofemman (25:an), which renamed L'Île Noire as Tintin in Skottland, literally Tintin in Scotland, or the Finnish newspaper Aamulehti, which renamed Coke en stock as Tintti Punaisella merellä, i.e. Tintin in the Red Sea. On the other hand, some periodicals opt for a more mysterious or dramatic title than the original. The American monthly magazine Children's Digest is a case in point, with The Castle of Doom for L'Île noire, and The Pharaoh's Revenge for Les Cigares du pharaon. When it published the definitive version of Tintin en Amérique between 1950 and 1952, after having published the pre-war version, L'Écho illustré renamed the story Tintin et Milou contre les gangsters to make it look like an original story. (Note: Kursner (2021, p. 345))

=== Changes without Hergé's approval ===
Many of the periodicals that republished the Adventures of Tintin made changes without the cartoonist's approval. From the very first publication of a story outside Belgium, in the French weekly Cœurs vaillants in 1930, the reporter's adventures underwent many alterations. Abbé Gaston Courtois, the magazine's editor, felt that the speech balloons were not sufficient to ensure that the story was properly understood by readers. So, after the first two episodes of Tintin in the Land of the Soviets, he decided to adapt the story by placing recitatives under each drawing, without asking Hergé's permission. He intervened, and only six issues were published in this format. The same periodical altered certain dialogues, usually for political or religious reasons. (Note: Kursner (2021, pp. 388–393)) When the first version of Tintin in the Land of Black Gold was published in 1940, the "Arabs" became the "rebels", and the names of certain characters were changed, such as the Jewish leader Finkelstein, renamed Durand, to erase all traces of the conflict between Arabs and Jews.

The first periodical to offer a translation of Les Aventures de Tintin, the Portuguese weekly O Papagaio took several initiatives without informing Hergé. The plates were colored, the layout was based on five strips instead of six, some vignettes were removed or reordered, and text was added or deleted. Following the example of the Portuguese newspaper, other periodicals colorize the plates themselves, without informing the artist. Such is the case with the German magazine Fix und Foxi and the Argentinian periodical Billiken. (Note: Kursner (2021, pp. 393–399)) Another Portuguese magazine, Diabrete, published a modified drawing of the cover of Casterman's original edition of The Sceptre of Ottokar on the front cover of one of its issues.

Hergé's drawings were also regularly censored. For example, depictions of weapons, alcohol or black characters were erased in the American magazine Children's Digest, while references to alcohol in Tintin in Tibet were altered in the Swedish newspaper Pelle Svanslös. The British weekly Eagle removes an advertising poster for a cigarette brand in The Sceptre of Ottokar, while in the Egyptian edition of Tintin, Loch Lomond whisky becomes orange juice. In the same periodical, hats are systematically erased, and boxes showing Arabs at a disadvantage are systematically adapted or redrawn in Cigars of the Pharaoh.

According to a study by Volker Jess, a German specialist in Hergé's work, Fix und Foxi was the magazine that made the greatest number of changes without the cartoonist's consent: boxes were enlarged or shortened in various adventures, and details were sometimes added. In 1957, another German newspaper, Hamburger Abendblatt, replaced the third panel of the first plate of The Seven Crystal Balls, which showed a newspaper insert, with a drawing not by Hergé. The contents of the newspaper insert are reproduced in the introductory text above the first plate.

Hergé's comic strips are sometimes transposed into short stories. This is the case for titles appearing in the Turkish weekly Doğan Kardeş, which even goes so far as to make Captain Haddock Tintin's uncle and Professor Calculus his father in Le Temple du Soleil.

=== Incomplete publications ===
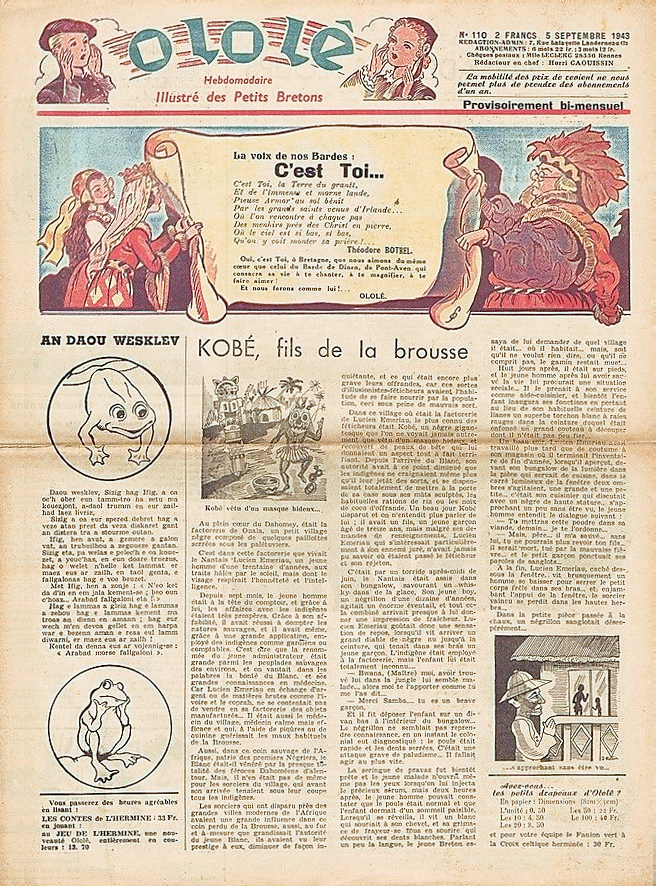
Front page of the Breton newspaper Ololê, September 5, 1943.

The Adventures of Tintin appeared in incomplete form in some newspapers. Most hors-texte illustrations were removed, as these large images were not adapted to the publication format of many press titles. The French weekly Cœurs vaillants, Tintin's first foreign distributor, made some cuts: in 1930, two panels of Tintin in the Land of the Soviets, showing the hero making a wooden propeller, were removed, as were eleven panels showing a British plane throwing leaflets at the Bab El Ehr camp in the first version of Tintin in the Land of Black Gold ten years later. In 1942, four plates of The Crab with the Golden Claws were not published, as was one of the final plates of The Mysterious Star in 1944.

In the Swiss weekly L'Écho illustré, only 64 of the 139 plates of Tintin in the Land of the Soviets were published after teachers complained about the "stupidity of the serial". A few years later, the same periodical published a version of L'Oreille cassée, with the first thirteen plates removed. The South American adventure was cut by seventeen plates when it appeared in the German weekly Der Sonntag, which omitted Tintin's encounter with the Arumbayas. Le Sceptre d'Ottokar suffered a similar fate in many periodicals: the British weekly Eagle and the German daily Hamburger Abendblatt both removed all three plates from the Syldavian tourist brochure, the latter even going so far as to remove some fifty boxes deemed superfluous.

Two other German newspapers, Die Kleine Zeitung and Deutscher Hausfreund, published The Crab with the Golden Claws without the off-text, each removing one plate, the sixth and thirty-seventh respectively. The periodical Heim und Leben published only twenty-six plates and three strips of The Black Island, pretending that the story ended when Tintin tied two bandits to a tree. For reasons of space, the illustrious Fix und Foxi removed numerous panels from L'Affaire Tournesol and L'Étoile mystérieuse. The latter adventure was also shortened in the Swedish magazine Året Runt. In the same periodical, the second issue of Les Sept Boules de cristal (1979-1980) was considerably shortened, whereas the first issue in 1968 did not lack a single frame. The Spanish magazine Blanco y Negro, which published several Tintin adventures between 1957 and 1961, often removed the first box of the story, replacing it with an introductory summary.

The decision not to publish a story in its entirety is sometimes a commercial decision. For example, Le Chevalier de l'hostie, the Egyptian edition of Cœurs vaillants, decided not to publish the beginning and end of Tintin en Amérique to preserve suspense and encourage readers to buy the album published by Dar Al Maaref in 1946. For the same reasons, the Breton magazine Ololê, which published Tintin in the Land of the Soviets between 1942 and 1943, withdrew the beginning and end, even though its director, Herry Caouissin, wanted to publish the album himself. On a different note, there were frequent interchanges of plates, strips, and boxes, as well as typographical errors.

=== Requirements of album publishers ===
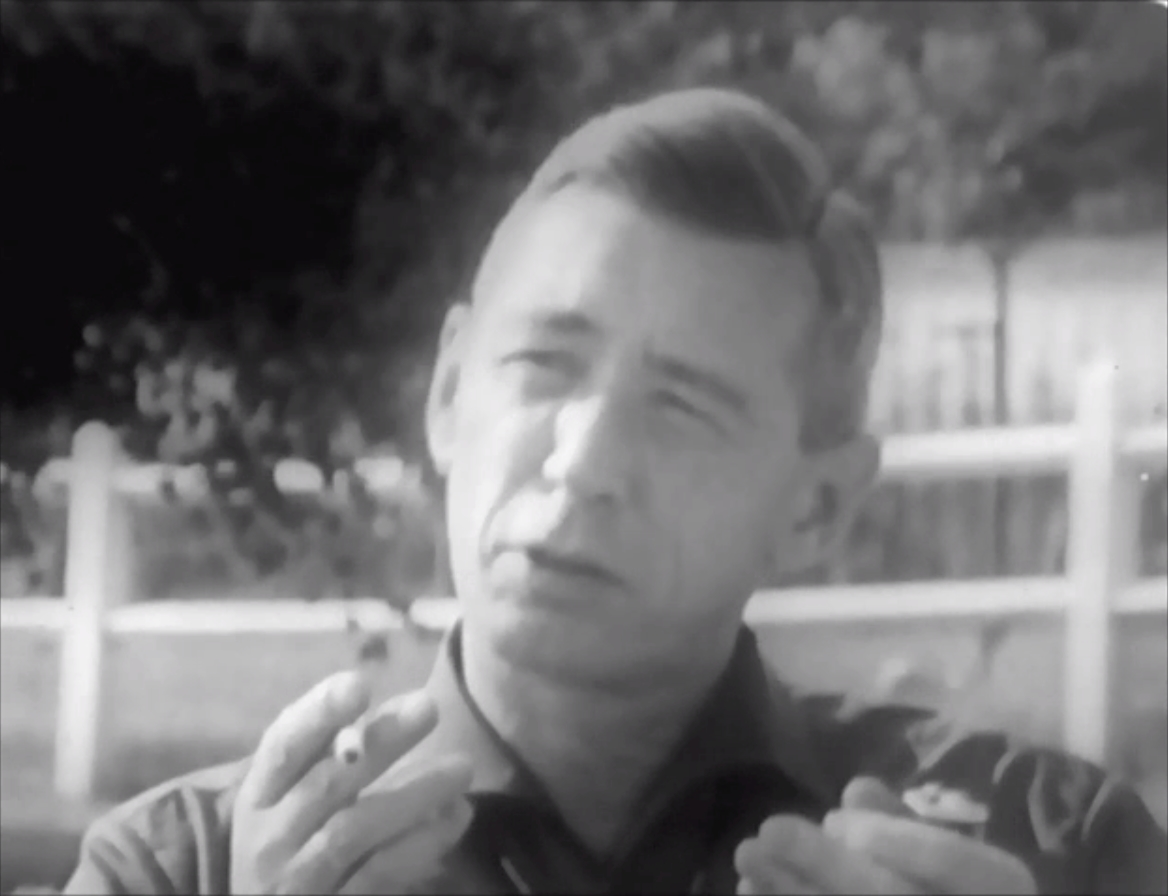
Hergé in 1962.

The first Adventures of Tintin were drawn in black and white. In 1942, at the request of his publisher Casterman, Hergé agreed to switch to color, which meant recasting the first adventures to fit the new standard publication format of 62 plates. (Note: Assouline (1996, pp. 323–324)) It was for this reason that Hergé began a collaboration with Edgar P. Jacobs, whose work for the weekly magazine Bravo! was widely acclaimed. For Casterman, publishing albums in color was essential to establishing a lasting foothold in the French market, all the more so in the context of the German occupation of Belgium and France, which led to a halt in imports of American illustrated books and financial difficulties for several French publishing houses. At the same time, the publication of Tintin's Adventures in Le Soir offered Hergé's productions considerable publicity. In February 1941, Casterman invested in an offset press, which offered better-quality printing at a lower cost than the letterpress press. Although Hergé initially maintained his reservations, he eventually gave in to his publisher's demands.

From the 1950s onwards, the publisher encouraged the author and his team to carry out a series of rewrites. According to historian Florian Moine, Casterman's aim was "to avoid any misrepresentation between Hergé's work and the children's readership, to adapt to the socio-cultural changes of the Trente Glorieuses and to deal with the criticism of the series' content that was emerging in the general press". Thus, in 1953, L'Étoile mystérieuse was modified to attenuate the traces of anti-Americanism and anti-Semitism contained in the story. (Note: Peeters (2011, p. 247)) The American nationality of Tintin's rival crew was replaced by that of an imaginary country, Sao Rico, and the name of the Jewish banker who financed it was changed. In the 1960s, Casterman imposed changes on the dialogues of The Crab with the Golden Claws and Coke in Stock to counter accusations of racism towards black populations. For example, the word "nègre" was changed to "homme" and the insult "iconoclaste" replaced "commerce noir". For Florian Moine, these changes are all the more necessary given that, "having become a product of mass cultural consumption, the Adventures of Tintin must be consensual".

Hergé also had to comply with the demands of his foreign publishers, who asked him to make alterations. In 1959, at the request of Georges Duplaix, he gave in to a form of censorship and redrew some boxes in The Crab with the Golden Claws. Firstly, a black sailor on the Karaboudjan became white in the American edition, as the proximity of black and white characters was frowned upon in a country where racial segregation was still rife. In addition, boxes showing Captain Haddock drinking alcohol were removed, to outlaw any depiction of alcoholism, however humorous. (Note: Assouline (1996, p. 473-475)) In 1973, another American publisher of the series asked Hergé to redraw the black characters in Tintin in America as Hispanic or white.

In 1965, Methuen, the British publisher of the Tintin albums, wrote to Hergé to point out the numerous inconsistencies and approximations in the original version of The Black Island, drawn between 1937 and 1938. The publisher drew up an exhaustive list of 131 errors, prompting Hergé to completely redraw the album and propose an updated version. Hergé's collaborator at Studios Hergé, Bob de Moor, traveled to Great Britain to sketch and take photographs, which made the story more authentic, without altering the script. For the same purpose, Methuen demanded in 1970 that Tintin au pays de l'or noir (Tintin in the Land of Black Gold), which was twenty years old, be modernized. Hergé redrew some of the pages to reshape the plot and the setting, removing the 1940s setting of British Mandate Palestine. The final version of the album takes place in a fictitious Arab country, a setting and context that Hergé describes as "more timeless".

== Bibliography ==
- Assouline, Pierre (1996). Hergé (biography). Paris: Gallimard. ISBN 978-2-259-18104-4. OCLC 34681340.
- Goddin, Philippe (2007). Hergé: lignes de vie (in French). Éditions Moulinsart. ISBN 978-2-87424-097-3. OCLC 182733794.
- Grutman, Rainier (2020). Tintin au pays des traductions. Parallèles. pp. 177–193.
- Kursner, Geoffroy (2021). Hergé et la presse: Ses bandes dessinées dans les journaux du monde entier. Bruxelles: Les Impressions nouvelles. p. 616. ISBN 978-2-87449-921-0.
- Peeters, Benoît (2011). Hergé, fils de Tintin (1st ed.). Paris: Flammarion. ISBN 978-2-08-126789-3. OCLC 52812831.

== See also ==
- List of Tintin media

== Notes and references ==
=== General ===
- Geoffroy Kursner, Hergé et la presse, 2021:
- Bibliographical references:
