= Law of Suspects =

1793 French decree beginning the Reign of Terror

National Convention
- Long title: Decree concerning suspected persons
- Territorial extent: France
- Enacted: 17 September 1793
- Repealed: 7 October 1795

Legislative history
- Rapporteur: Philippe-Antoine Merlin de Douai
- Committee responsible: Legislation
- Passed: 17 September 1793

Repealed by
- Law repealing those of 17 September 1793, 5 Ventôse, and 21 Germinal, Year III, concerning suspected persons and disarmament, of 15 Vendémiaire

Text of statute as originally enacted
- Status: Repealed

The Law of Suspects (French: Loi des suspects) was a decree passed by the French National Convention on 17 September 1793, during the French Revolution. Some historians consider this decree the start of the Reign of Terror; they argue that the decree marked a significant weakening of individual freedoms that led to "revolutionary paranoia" that swept the nation.

The law ordered the arrest of all avowed enemies and suspected enemies of the Revolution, and specifically aimed at unsubmissive former nobles, émigrés, officials removed or suspended from office, officers suspected of treason, and hoarders of goods.

The following year, the decree was expanded and became more strict. Implementation of the law and arrests were entrusted to oversight committees, and not to the legal authorities. The decree also introduced the maxim that subjects had to prove their innocence (the inverse of "innocent until proven guilty"), which was later extended by the Law of 22 Prairial (10 June 1794).

The decree, with its effect of "Terror", lasted until 5 August 1794, when the Convention decided the release of all the prisoners, against whom "weighs no charge".

== History ==
The Law of Suspects, actually a decree rather than a law, was based on a proposal by Philippe-Antoine Merlin de Douai and Jean Jacques Régis de Cambacérès, approved by the National Convention of the French First Republic. It supplemented an earlier law of 10 March 1793, which created the revolutionary tribunals but contained a much narrower definition of suspects.

Before its enactment, obstinate, anti-republican Catholic priests, called 'refractory clergy' (French: clergé réfractaire), were alleged to be royalist suspects by the Decree of 17 November 1791. Beginning on 10 August 1792, when the constitutional reign of Louis XVI was suspended by the Legislative Assembly, these priests, as well as émigrés and their parents, had been expelled, deported, jailed, and sometimes murdered by radical revolutionary sans-culottes.

The term suspect had been in common parlance by 1793, but had not been defined by consensus. Radical sections of Paris demanded that these suspects be arrested, but National Convention failed to act decisively. On 23 March it ordered a disarmament of suspects and, on 2 June, it decreed that those "notoriously suspected of aristocracy and bad citizenship" should be arrested.

The Law of Suspects was finally debated after the invasion of the National Convention by the sections of Paris on 5 September. Its purpose was to define broadly who was to be arrested and examined before revolutionary tribunals. It also forced legislature to adopt the Maximum.

The Committee of Public Safety was given broad powers to arrest and punish. On its behalf, the Surveillance Committees, constituted by a law of 21 March 1793, were responsible for drawing up lists of suspects and for issuing arrest warrants. Citizens were required to carry certificates of civism, attesting to the bearer's good citizenship.

The famous definition of suspects as: "Those who have done nothing against freedom, also have done nothing for it," was part of a provision written by the regional Paris Commune on 11 October 1793. It is often wrongly attributed to wording in the Law of Suspects itself.

== Text of the decree ==
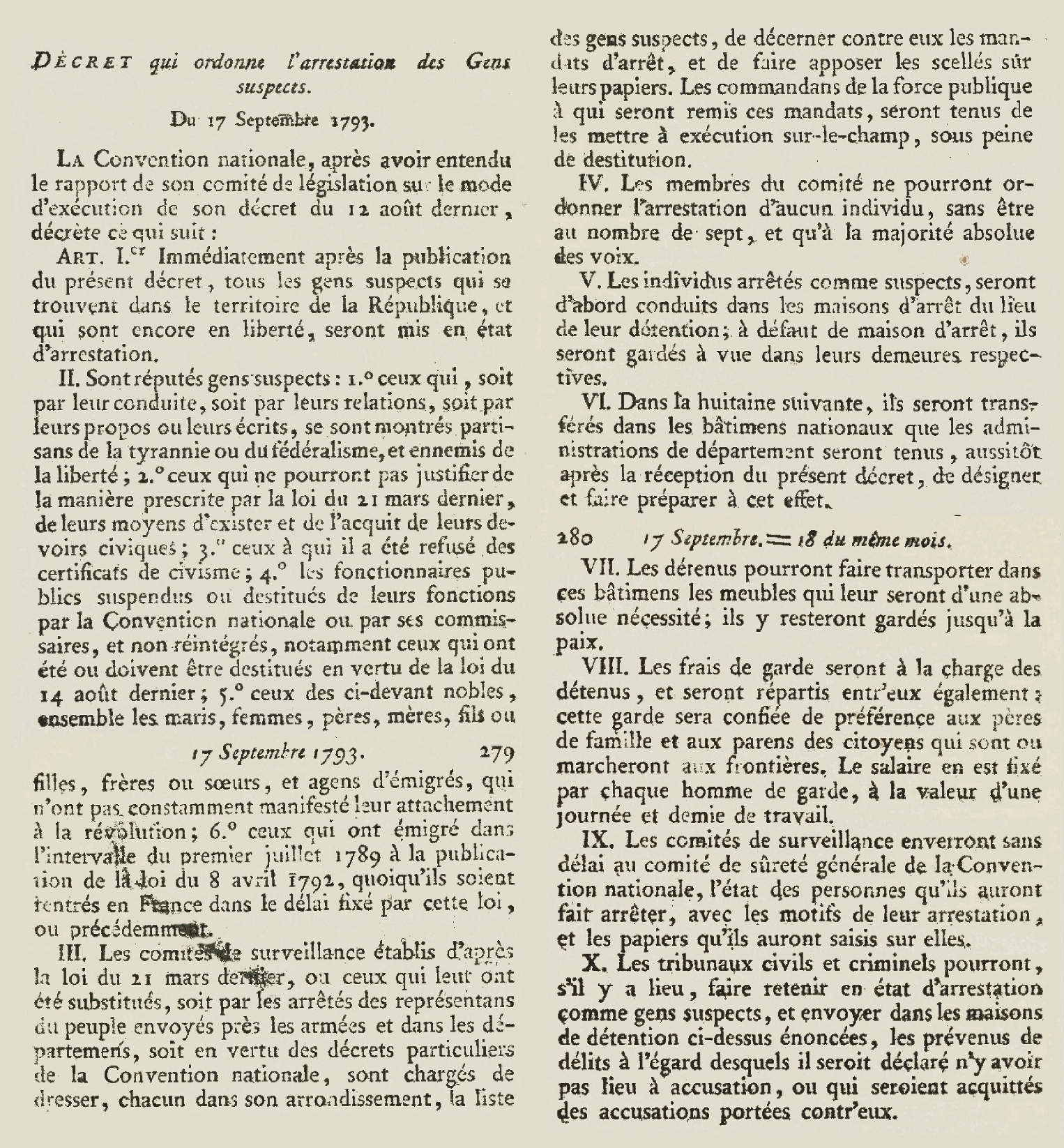
Text of the decree, issued by the French National Convention, ordering "the arrest of Suspect People", 17 September 1793.

Decree that orders the arrest of Suspect People.

Of 17 September 1793.

The National Convention, having heard the report of its legislative committee on the method of bringing into effect its decree of last 12 August, decrees the following:

Art. I. Immediately after publication of this decree, all suspect people who are to be found on the territory of the Republic, and who are still in freedom, will be put under arrest.

II. Considered as suspect people are:
1º Those who, either by their conduct, or their relations, or by their words or writings, have shown themselves to be partisans of tyranny or of federalism, and enemies of freedom;
2º Those who cannot justify, in the manner prescribed by the decree of last 21 March, their means of existence and the acquittal of their civic duties;
3º Those to whom have been denied certificates of good citizenship;
4º Public officials who have been suspended or discharged from their functions by the National Convention or its commissioners and have not been reinstated, notably those who have been or ought to be discharged under the law of last 14 August;
5º Those former nobles, with their husbands, wives, fathers, mothers, son or daughters, brothers or sisters, and agents of émigrés, who have not consistently demonstrated their commitment to the Revolution;
6º Those who have emigrated during the interval between 1 July 1789 and the publication of the law of 8 April 1792, even if they have returned to France within the time prescribed by that law, or earlier;

== Estimated number of victims ==
- Donald Greer: 500,000 accused suspects under the Terror, based on research into historical records. 35,000 to 40,000 casualties, including 16,594 executed following legal processes, and the other executions corresponding to the areas of civil war.
- Albert Mathiez: 300,000 victims. In Paris originally 6,000, and more than 8,000 on the eve of the Thermidorian Reaction.
- Louis Jacob: 70,000 suspects.
- Jean Tulard: 500,000 prisoners and 300,000 people assigned to house arrest.
- The Encyclopædia Britannica puts the number detained by the law at "more than 200,000," noting that most never stood trial although they languished in disease-infested prisons where 10,000 perished, and military commissions and revolutionary tribunals gave death sentences to 17,000 others.
- Jean-Louis Matharan: Considers that "any overall figure of detained suspects remain in the state is pure conjecture," especially since, from August 1792 to Thermidor Year II, "the release of jailed suspects was uninterrupted," although there were probably fewer arrests, and that there have been claims about the rapid release of those arrested and shorter terms of imprisonment.

== End of the law ==
The Law of Suspects fell into disuse by 5 August 1794, which meant the end of "the Terror". Direction was replaced by revolutionary surveillance committees (Comité de surveillance révolutionnaire) responsible for the practical exercise of repression, with oversight by district committees.

== Bibliography ==
- Projet de Décret sur le mode d'exécution du décret du 12 août, qui ordonne l'arrestation des gens suspects, presented to the Convention Nationale by Philippe-Antoine Merlin (de Douai) (Paris, 1793)

== See also ==
- French First Republic
- National Convention
- War in the Vendée
