= Les Nouvelles de Tahiti =

French newspaper

Les Nouvelles de Tahiti was a daily, French Polynesian newspaper headquartered in Tahiti. The newspaper, which published in French, was owned by Groupe Hersant Média. Les Nouvelles de Tahiti launched its website on December 3, 2008.

Les Nouvelles de Tahiti printed its final edition on 23 May 2014.
