= Certificate of civism =

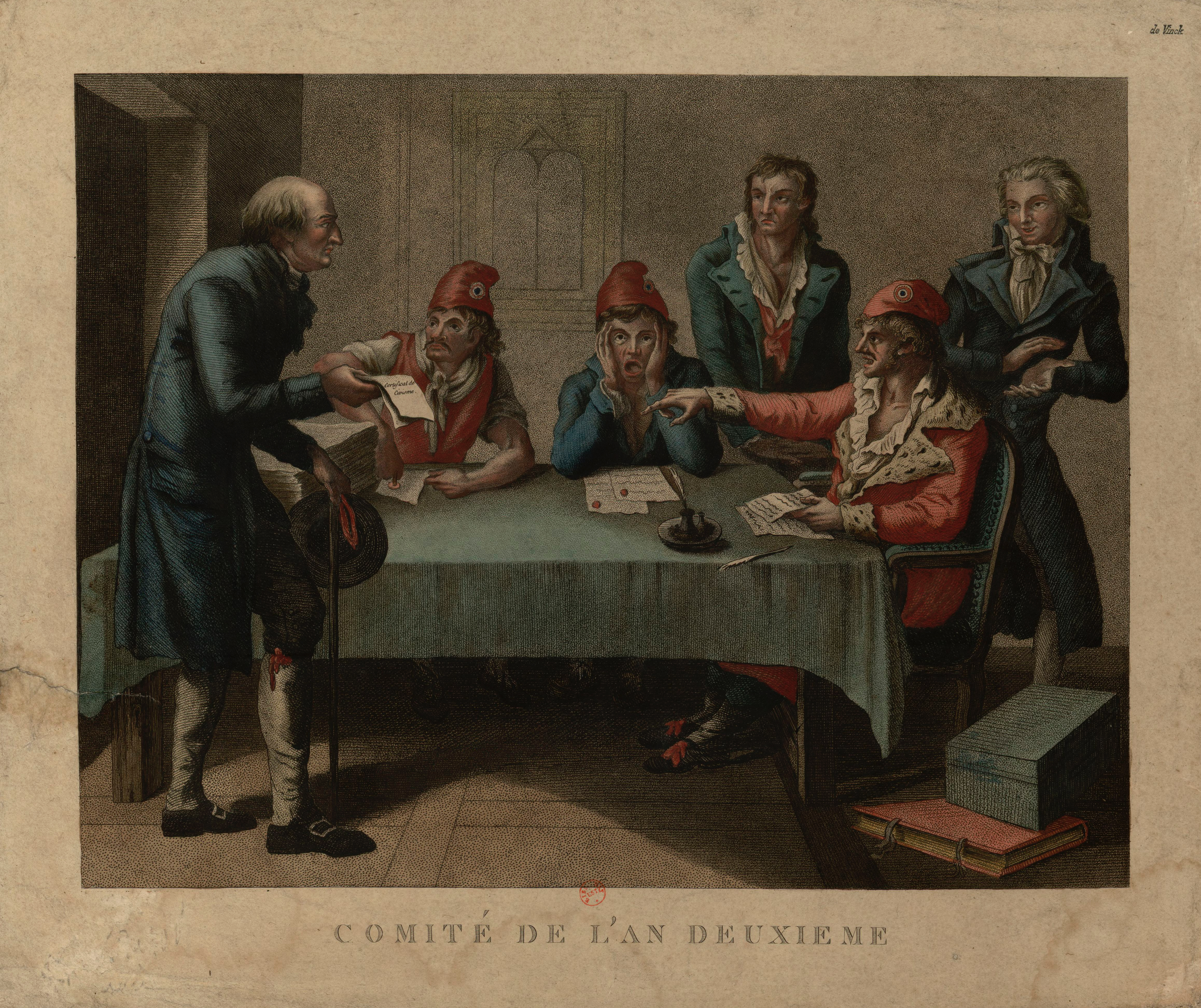
Verification of certificat de civisme by a Comité de surveillance

During the French Revolution, the certificate of civism (French: Certificat de civisme) was issued in Paris by the General Council of the Paris Commune, attesting that the person who had it in his possession had fulfilled his civic duties: a certificate of good conduct and political orthodoxy, as it were. It was mainly issued to those responsible for public affairs. Many people asked for this certificate during the Reign of Terror. Under the Law of Suspects, passed on 17 September 1793, those who were not given it were liable to be arrested. It was abolished at the beginning of September 1795.

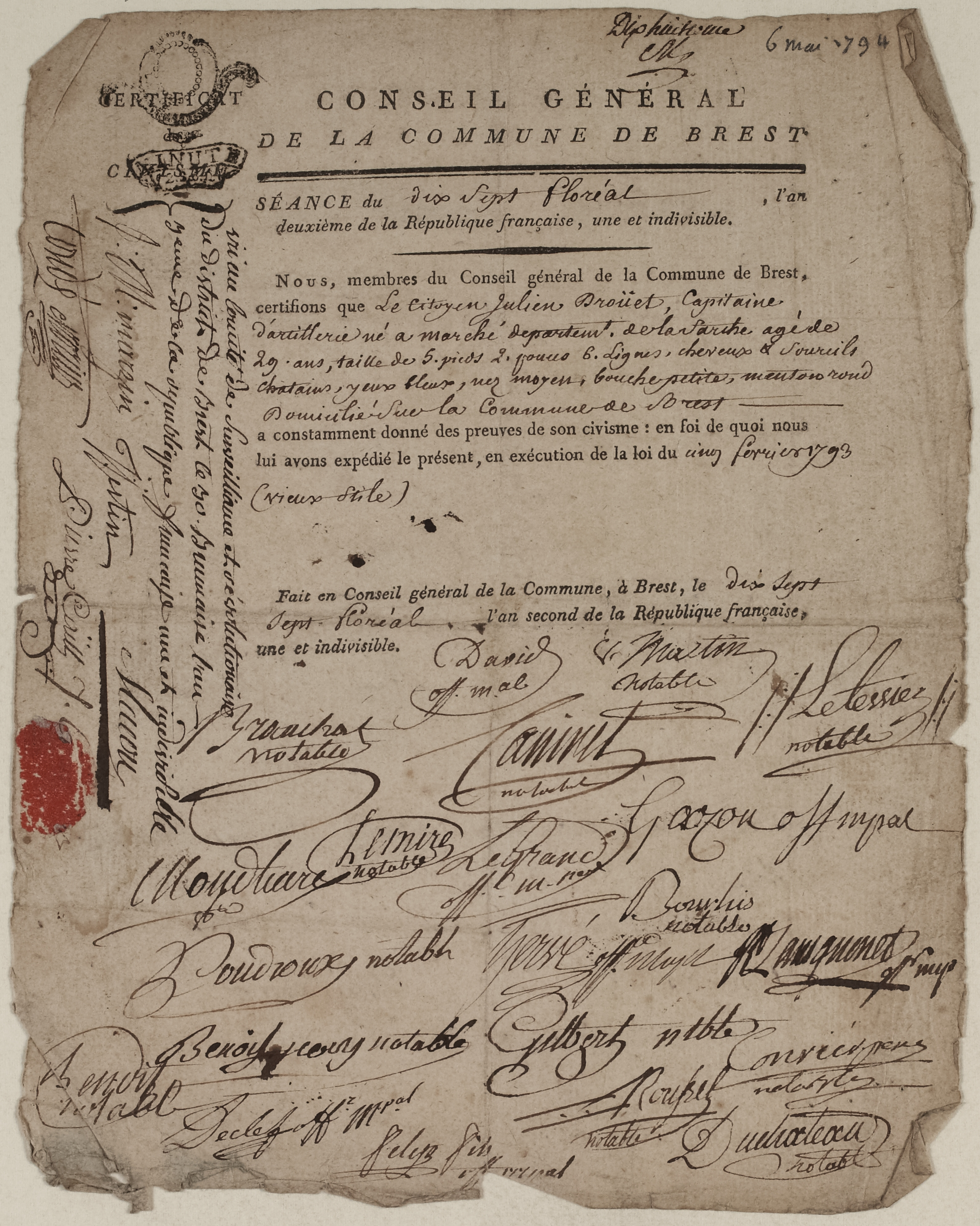
Certificat de civisme issued by the General Council of the Commune of Brest, 1794

== Bibliography ==
- Ihl, Olivier (2006). "Hiérarchiser des égaux". Revue Française d'Histoire des Idées Politiques. 23: 35–53. doi:10.3917/rfhip.023.0035. S2CID 144458886.
- (in French) Jean Tulard, Jean-François Fayard and Alfred Fierro, Histoire et dictionnaire de la Révolution française. 1789–1799, Robert Laffont, Bouquins collection, Paris, 1987 (ISBN 270282076X)
