= Totalitarianism =

Extreme form of authoritarianism and a theoretical concept

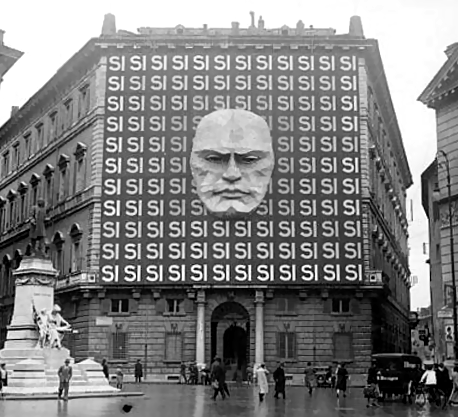
Facade of the Palazzo Braschi in Rome during the 1934 Italian general election in which only a list of deputies of the National Fascist Party were permitted to run. It shows the face of Benito Mussolini with the word "Yes" (shown in the image as "Si" in Italian) repeated across the facade, indicating that the Fascist regime wanted Italian voters to vote "Yes" to accept the list of deputies. The list put forward was ultimately approved by 99.85% of voters.

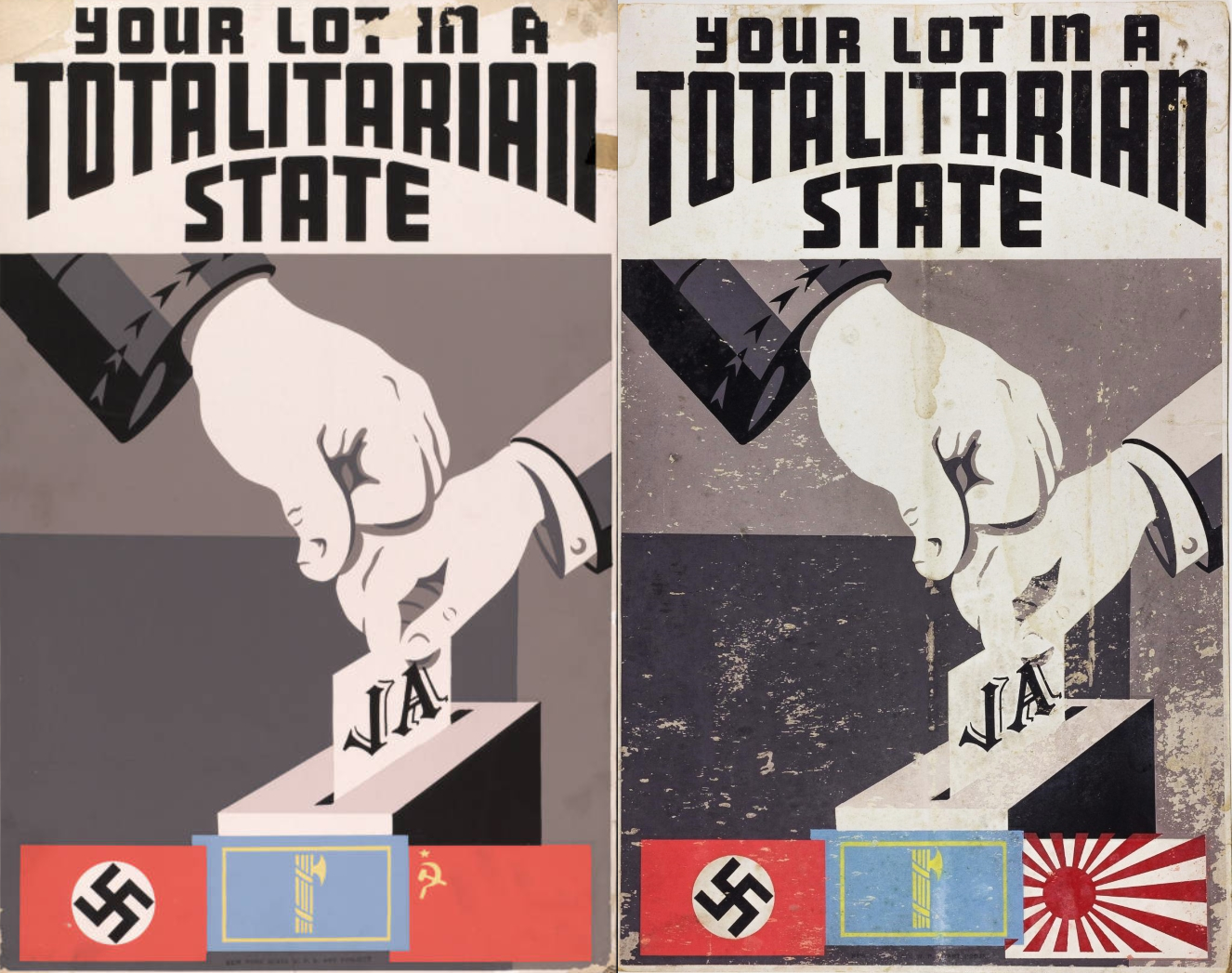
Two versions of the World War II U.S. propaganda poster "Your Lot in a Totalitarian State" depicting a process of compulsory sham election which took place in totalitarian states, the flags of which – Nazi Germany, Fascist Italy (Note: shows the Standard of the Duce instead of the national flag) and the Soviet Union – are presented below. In the version on the right, produced after Operation Barbarossa, the flag of the Soviet Union (Allied member) is replaced with that of the Empire of Japan (Note: shows the Rising Sun Flag instead of the national flag) (Axis member), which is not always regarded as totalitarian by Western scholars. In regards to the USSR, the label has also received some criticism.

Totalitarianism is a political system and a form of government that completely controls the public sphere and the private sphere of society. It is characterized by its prohibition of opposing political parties and its extreme suppression of opposition to the state.

A totalitarian government uses ideology to control most aspects of human life, such as the political economy of the country, the system of education, the arts and sciences, and the private morality of its citizens. In the exercise of power, the difference between a totalitarian government and an authoritarian government is one of degree. Whereas totalitarianism features a charismatic dictator and a fixed worldview, authoritarianism only features a dictator who holds power for the sake of holding power. The authoritarian dictator is supported, either jointly or individually, by a military junta and by the socio-economic elites who are the ruling class of the country.

The word totalitarian was first used in the early 1920s to describe the Italian Fascist government. The term totalitarianism gained wider usage in politics of the interwar period; in the early years of the Cold War, it arose from comparison of the Soviet Union under Joseph Stalin to Nazi Germany under Adolf Hitler as a theoretical concept of Western political science. The term achieved hegemony in explaining the nature of Fascist and Communist states, and later entered the Western historiography of Communism, the Soviet Union and the Russian Revolution; in the 21st century, it became applied to Islamist movements and their governments. The concept of totalitarianism has been challenged and criticized by some historians of Nazi Germany and Stalinist USSR. While the two states are defined as exemplary cases of totalitarianism, these historians argue that the main characteristics of the concept – total control over society, total mobilization of the masses, and a monolithic centralized character of the government – were never achieved by the dictatorships called totalitarian. To support this claim, the historians argue that the political structures of these states were disorganized and chaotic, and that despite the supposed external similarities between Nazism and Stalinism, their internal logic and structure were substantially different. The applicability of the concept to Islamism has also been criticized.

== Definitions ==
=== Contemporary background ===
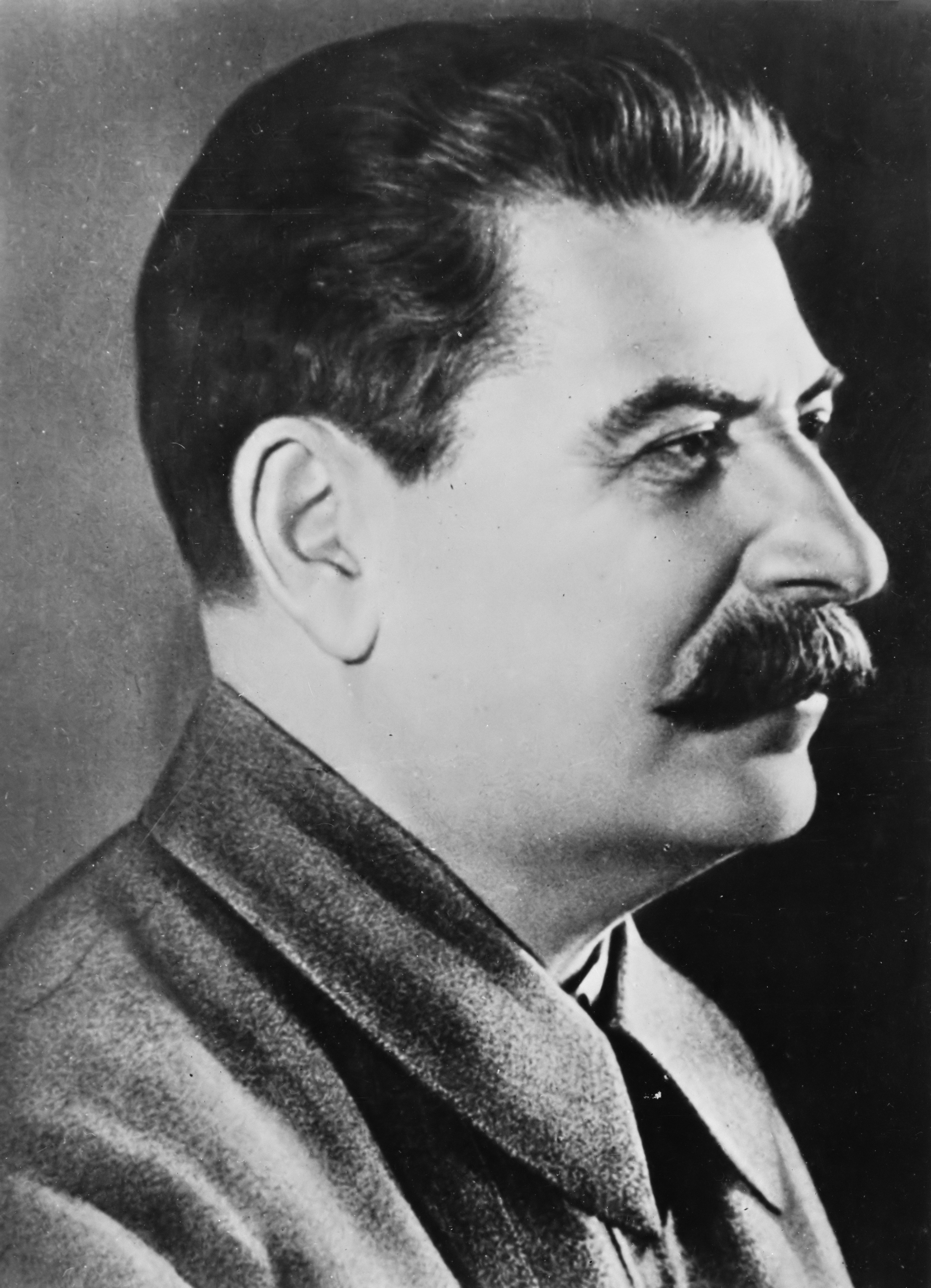
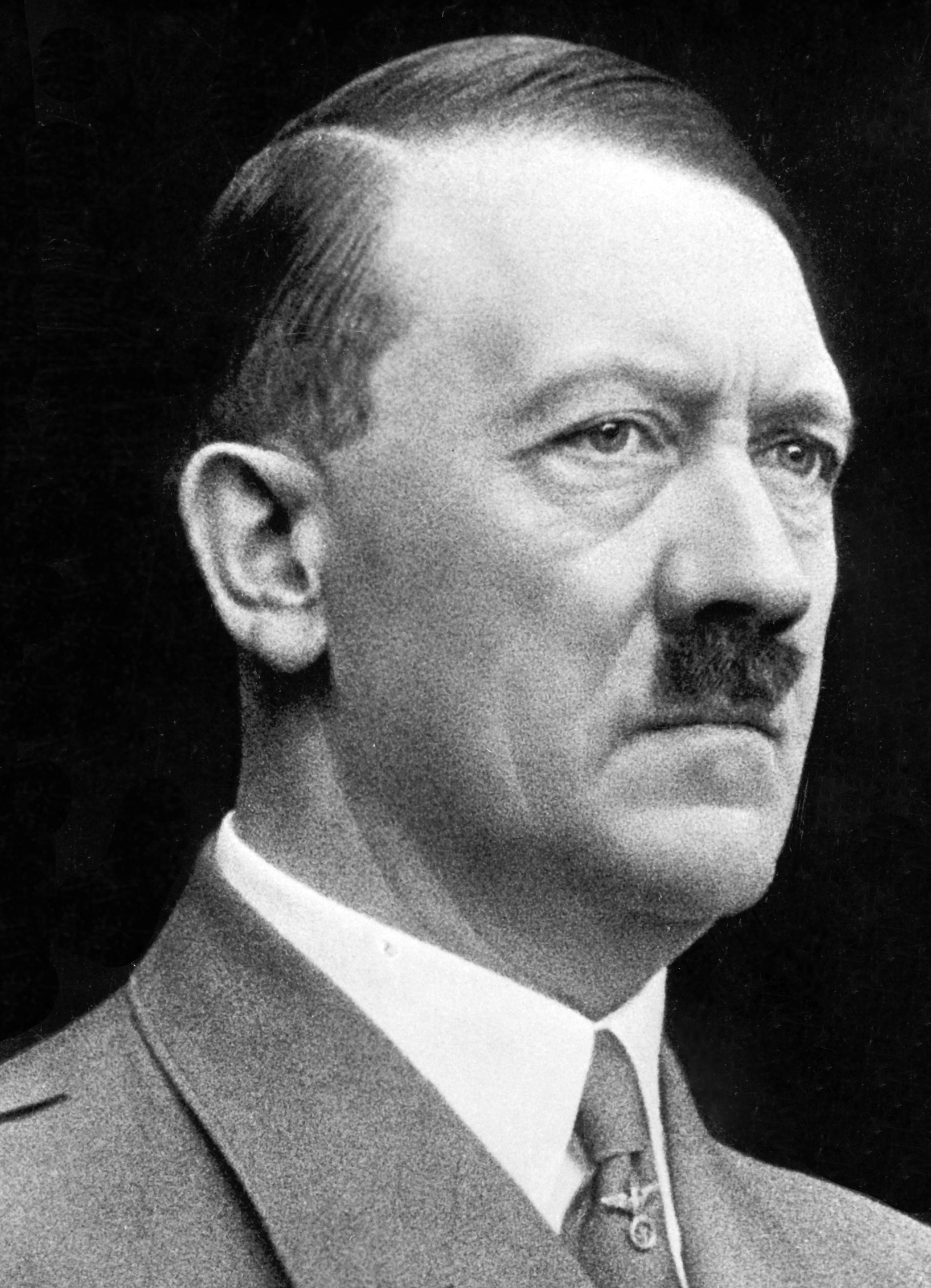
Joseph Stalin (left), leader of the Soviet Union, and Adolf Hitler (right), leader of Nazi Germany, respectively to their positions on the left–right political spectrum; totalitarianism as a concept of Western political science and later historiography emerged from comparison of their regimes defined as exemplary cases of totalitarianism.

Modern political science catalogues three régimes of government: (i) the democratic, (ii) the authoritarian, and (iii) the totalitarian. Varying by political culture, the functional characteristics of the totalitarian régime of government are: political repression of all opposition (individual and collective); a cult of personality about The Leader; official economic interventionism (controlled wages and prices); official censorship of all mass communication media (the press, textbooks, cinema, television, radio, internet); official mass surveillance-policing of public places; and state terrorism. In the essay "Democide in Totalitarian States" (1994) the American political scientist Rudolph Rummel, while acknowledging that there is "much confusion about what is meant by totalitarian" up to denial that totalitarian systems have ever existed, defined a totalitarian state as "one with a system of government that is unlimited, [either] constitutionally or by countervailing powers in society (such as by a Church, rural gentry, labor unions, or regional powers); is not held responsible to the public by periodic secret and competitive elections; and employs its unlimited power to control all aspects of society, including the family, religion, education, business, private property, and social relationships." According to Rummel, such governments act as "agencies of totalitarianism" itself, that is, "the ideology of absolute power", which installs "mortacracy" in states controlled by it. Rummel cited Marxism–Leninism and communism in the Soviet Union under Joseph Stalin, China under Mao Zedong and in East Germany, Nazism in Germany under Adolf Hitler and fascism in other states, state socialism (Burmese Way to Socialism) in Burma under U Ne Win and Islamic fundamentalism (Islamism) in Iran as examples of totalitarianism. However, not all scholars believe these regimes and ideologies exemplify totalitarianism: some of those who support of the concept of totalitarianism exclude Burma, Iran and even Fascist Italy from this category, while historians who state that the concept can not adequately describe Stalinism nor Nazism criticize the concept of totalitarianism in general (see below).

Degree of control

In exercising the power of government upon society, the application of an official dominant ideology differentiates the worldview of the totalitarian régime from the worldview of the authoritarian régime, which is "only concerned with political power, and, as long as [government power] is not contested, [the authoritarian government] gives society a certain degree of liberty." Having no ideology to propagate, the politically secular authoritarian government "does not attempt to change the world and human nature", whereas the "totalitarian government seeks to completely control the thoughts and actions of its citizens", by way of an official "totalist ideology, a [political] party reinforced by a secret police, and monopolistic control of industrial mass society."

=== Historical background ===
For influential philosopher Karl Popper, the social phenomenon of political totalitarianism is a product of Modernism, which Popper said originated in humanist philosophy; in the Republic (res publica) proposed by Plato in Ancient Greece, in Hegel's conception of the State as a polity of peoples, and in the political economy of Karl Marx in the 19th century. Yet historians and philosophers of those periods dispute the historiographic accuracy of Popper's 20th-century interpretation and delineation of the historical origins of totalitarianism, because, for example, the ancient Greek philosopher Plato did not invent the modern State. Popper's approach has been described as a radical denial of historical causation and as an ahistorical attempt to present totalitarianism and liberalism not as products of historical development, but as eternal and timeless categories of humankind itself.

There were similar "ideocratic" attempts in traditions of the Counter-Enlightenment to trace totalitarianism back to the times preceding the 20th century: Eric Voegelin saw totalitarianism as "the journey's end of the Gnostic search for a civil theology", an epilogue of the process of secularization which began with the Reformation and led to a world deprived of any religiosity; Jacob Talmon thought totalitarianism to be a merger of left-wing radical democracy (from Jean-Jacques Rousseau, Maximilien Robespierre and François-Noël Babeuf) and right-wing irrationalism (from Johann Gottlieb Fichte) as traditions opposed to empirical liberalism; the German philosophers Max Horkheimer and Theodor W. Adorno viewed totalitarianism as an ineluctable destiny of modernity rooted in the origins of the Western civilization and as an ultimate end of the evolution of the Enlightenment from emancipatory reason to instrumental rationality, and as a product of anthropocentrist proposition that: "Man has become the master of the world, a master unbound by any links to Nature, society, and history", which excludes the intervention of supernatural beings to earthly politics of government.

Enzo Traverso believes that the idea of "total state", or "totalitarian state" as it would be called later, came from the concept of "total war" which was used to describe World War I by its contemporaries: the war "shaped the imagination of an entire generation" by rationalizing nihilism and "methodical destruction of the enemy", introducing "a new warrior ethos in which the old ideals of heroism and chivalry merged with modern technology" and a process of brutalization of politics and such examples of "continentally planned industrial killing" as the Armenian genocide. "Total war" became "total state", and after the war, it was used as a pejorative by the Italian anti-fascists of the 1920s and later by the Italian Fascists themselves.

American historian William Rubinstein wrote that:

The 'Age of Totalitarianism' included nearly all the infamous examples of genocide in modern history, headed by the Jewish Holocaust, but also comprising the mass murders and purges of the Communist world, other mass killings carried out by Nazi Germany and its allies, and also the Armenian genocide of 1915. All these slaughters, it is argued here, had a common origin, the collapse of the elite structure and normal modes of government of much of central, eastern and southern Europe as a result of World War I, without which surely neither Communism nor Fascism would have existed except in the minds of unknown agitators and crackpots.

In the 20th century, Giovanni Gentile classified Italian Fascism as a political ideology with a philosophy that is "totalitarian, and [that] the Fascist State—a synthesis and a unity inclusive of all values—interprets, develops, and potentiates the whole life of a people"; Gentile expressed his ideas in "The Doctrine of Fascism" (1932), an essay he co-authored with Benito Mussolini. In 1920s Germany, during the Weimar Republic (1918–1933), the Nazi jurist Carl Schmitt integrated Gentile's Fascist philosophy of united national purpose to the supreme-leader ideology of the Führerprinzip.

Since the Cold War, the so-called 'traditionalist', or 'totalitarian', historians (see below) have argued that Vladimir Lenin, one of the leaders of the 1917 October Revolution in Russia, was the first politician to establish a totalitarian state; such description of Lenin is opposed by the so-called 'revisionist' historians of Communism and the Soviet Union as well as by a broad range of authors including Hannah Arendt.

As the Duce leading the Italian people to the future, Benito Mussolini said that his dictatorial régime of government made Fascist Italy (1922–1943) the representative Totalitarian State: "Everything in the State, nothing outside the State, nothing against the State." Likewise, in The Concept of the Political (1927), the Nazi jurist Schmitt used the term der Totalstaat (the Total State) to identify, describe, and establish the legitimacy of a German totalitarian state led by a supreme leader; later Joseph Goebbels would call a totalitarian state the goal of the Nazi Party, although the concept became downplayed in Nazi discourse.

After the Second World War (1937–1945), U.S. political discourse (domestic and foreign) included the concepts (ideologic and political) and the terms totalitarian, totalitarianism, and totalitarian model. In the post-war U.S. of the 1950s, to politically discredit the anti-fascism of the Second World War as misguided foreign policy and at the same time direct anti-fascists against Communism, McCarthyite politicians claimed that Left-wing totalitarianism was an existential threat to Western civilization, and so facilitated the creation of the American national security state to execute the anti-communist Cold War (1945–1989) that was fought by client-state proxies of the US and the USSR.

While the concept of totalitarianism became dominant in Anglo-American political discourse after World War II, it remained neglected in continental Europe except for West Germany: in such countries as Italy and France, where the Communist parties played a hegemonic role in the anti-fascist resistance, the pioneering works of the theory of totalitarianism by such authors as Hannah Arendt, Zbigniew Brzezinski and Carl Friedrich were often ignored or not even translated; the political theory of totalitarianism in these countries was promoted by Congress for Cultural Freedom supported by the CIA.

== Historiography ==
=== "Totalitarians" and "Revisionists" ===
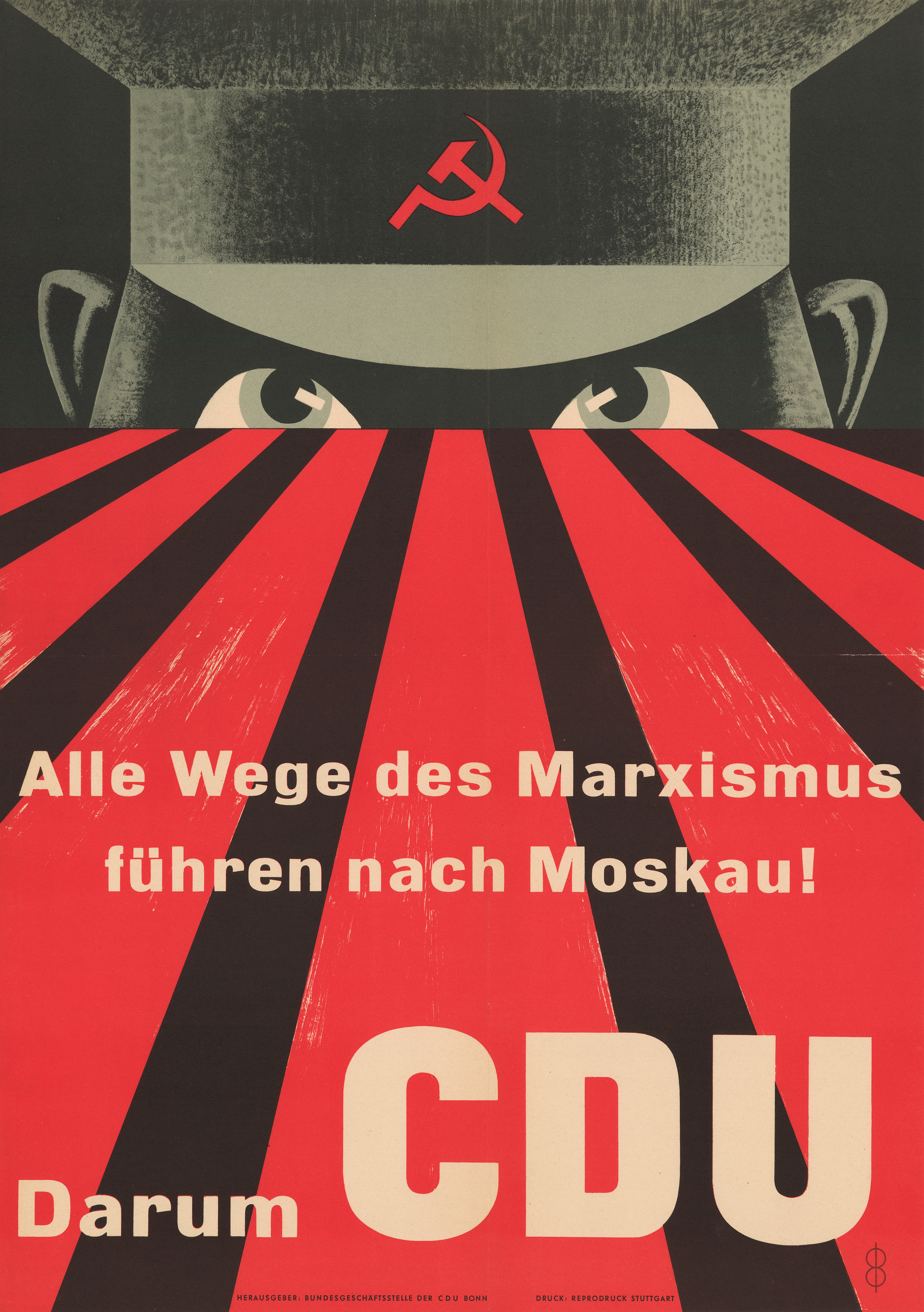
Anti-communist propaganda in West Germany (1953): "All ways of Marxism lead to Moscow! Therefore CDU".

The Western historiography of the USSR and the Soviet period of Russian history is divided into two schools of research and interpretation: (i) the traditionalist school of historiography and (ii) the revisionist school of historiography; the traditionalists and neo-traditionalists, or anti-revisionists, are also known as 'totalitarian school' or 'totalitarian approach' and 'Cold War' historians, for relying on concepts and interpretations rooted in the early years of the Cold War and even in the sphere Russian White émigrés of the 1920s.

Traditionalist-school historians characterize themselves as objective reporters of the claimed totalitarianism allegedly inherent to Marxism, to Communism, and to the political nature of Communist states, such as the USSR, while the Cold War revisionists criticized the politically liberal and anti-communist bias they perceived in the predominance of the traditionalists and describe their approach as emotional and oversimplifying. Revisionist-school historians criticise the traditionalist school's concentration upon the police-state aspects of Cold War history which they say leads it to anti-communist interpretation of history biased towards a right-wing interpretation of the documentary facts. The revisionists also oppose the equation of Nazism and Communism and Stalinism and stress such their ideological differences as the humanist and egalitarian origins of Communist ideology. In the 1960s, revisionists studying the Cold War and the Communist movement in the U.S. criticized the dominant ideas that American Communists were an actual threat to the United States and that the Cold War was the fault of Stalin's territorial and political ambitions and that Soviet expansionism and its alleged strife to conquer the world forced the U.S. to turn from isolationism to a global containment policy.

The difference between these two historiographic directions is not only political, but also as methodological: the 'traditionalists' focus on politics, ideology and personalities of the Bolshevik and Communist leaders, putting the latter in the center of history while largely ignoring social processes, and traditionalists present "history from above", directed by the leaders, while the revisionists put emphasis on "history from below" and social history of the Soviet government, and they describe the traditionalists as '(right-wing) romantics.' In their turn, the traditionalists defend their approach and methodology, dismiss focus on social history and accuse their opponents of Marxism and of rationalizing the actions of the Bolsheviks and failing to recognize the primary role of "one man" leading a movement (Vladimir Lenin or Adolf Hitler). Between the late 1970s and early 1980s, revisionist approaches became largely accepted in academic circles, and the term "revisionism" migrated to characterize a group of social historians focusing on the working class and the upheavals of the Stalin years. At the same time, traditionalist historians retained popularity and influence outside academic circles, especially in politics and public spheres of the United States, where they supported harder policies towards the USSR: for example, Zbigniew Brzezinski served as National Security Advisor to President Jimmy Carter, while Richard Pipes, a prominent historian of 'totalitarian school', headed the CIA group Team B; after 1991, their views have found popularity not only in the West, but also in the former USSR.

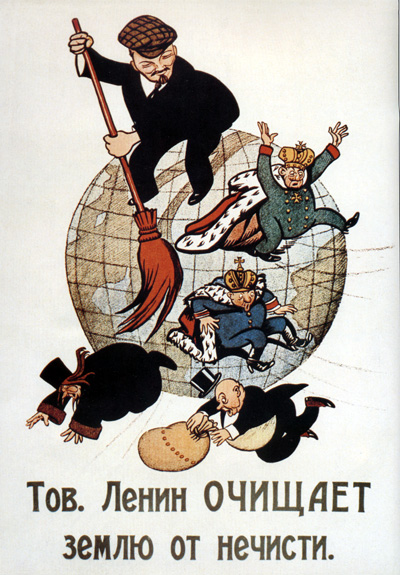
1920 Soviet propaganda poster with a complimentary cartoon of Vladimir Lenin by Viktor Deni. According to 'traditionalist' historians, Lenin was the first politician to establish a totalitarian regime; such description have been opposed by the 'revisionists' and other authors.

=== Leninism and the October Revolution ===
Since the 1980s, there has been a debate over the nature of the October Revolution between the traditionalists and the revisionists as well as a debate about the nature of the government of Vladimir Lenin. Traditionalist scholars believe that the government of Vladimir Lenin was a totalitarian dictatorship but revisionist scholars do not; the core argument of the traditionalists was based on their belief that the Revolution was a violent act which was carried out "from above" by a small group of intellectuals with brute force. Such traditionalist historians as Richard Pipes claimed that Soviet Russia of 1917–1924 was as totalitarian as the Soviet Union under Stalin was, and they also claim that Stalinist totalitarianism was a mere continuation of Lenin's policies because Stalinism was prefigured by Lenin's ideology, that Lenin was the "inventor" (Riley) of totalitarianism, and that further totalitarian governments just implemented the policies already invented: for example, Pipes compared Lenin to Hitler and stated that "The Stalinist and Nazi holocausts" stemmed from Lenin's Red Terror and had "much greater decorum" than the latter. The revisionists, on the contrary, stressed the genuinely 'popular' nature of the 1917 Revolution, and tended to see a discontinuity between Leninism and Stalinism; a revisionist historian Ronald Suny cites Hannah Arendt who distinguished Lenin's terror of the Russian Civil War, "a means to exterminate and frighten opponents", from totalitarian terror aimed not at specific enemies but at fulfilling ideological goals, solving the problem of inequality and poverty, "an instrument to rule masses who are perfectly obedient." It was also noted that Stalin became an uncontested dictator after a period of "authoritarian pluralism", while the one-party dictatorship and mass violence (the Red Terror) were interpreted not as a result of Lenin's totalitarian "blueprint", but rather of reactions (yet justified by the ideology) to current events and external factors, including wartime conditions and the struggle for survival, some historians highlighted the initial attempts of the Bolsheviks to form a coalition government.

Martin Malia noted that the debates on history were politically significant: if the 'traditionalists' were right, "Communism" "must be abolished", but if they were not, it could be reformed. Understanding of relationship of Lenin and Stalin as a continuity of the totalitarian regime was consensual for a major period; the first revisionists of the 1960s, social historians, also believed it to be a continuity, but as a continuity of policies of modernization, not as a continuity of totalitarianism; starting from the end of the 1960s, availability of new Soviet materials allowed to dispute the continuity for such historians as Moshe Lewin and break the consensus. According to Evan Mawdsley, "the 'revisionist' school had been dominant from the 1970s", and achieved "some success" in challenging the traditionalists.

=== Revisionists on Stalinism ===
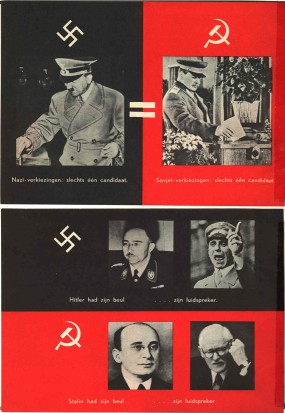
A document from the collection of Henri Max Corwin, equating Nazism with Stalinism.

The death of Stalin in 1953 voided the simplistic totalitarian model of the police-state USSR as the epitome of the totalitarian state. Starting from the 1970s, the 'revisionist' historians, described as those who "insisted that the old image of the Soviet Union as a totalitarian state bent on world domination was oversimplified or just plain wrong" and focused not on typology of power, but social history, such as Sheila Fitzpatrick began challenging the totalitarian paradigm; without denying the state violence by the government, these scholars argued that the Stalinist system could not and did not rule only through coercion and terror, and pointed to support within the population for many of Stalin's policies and argued that the party and state were often responsive to people's desires and values. More to it, they examined the substantial differences of Stalinist and Nazi violence that inevitably put into question the attempt to gather Stalin's and Hitler's regimes into a single category which was presented by the concept of totalitarianism. In 1999 the sociologists Randall Collins and David Waller grouped the concept of totalitarianism among the "theories that were completely wrong"; in Beyond Totalitarianism: Stalinism and Nazism Compared (2008), Fitzpatrick and Michael Geyer critically examined the concept of totalitarianism and made a very detailed comparison of similarities and substantial differences between Hitler and Stalin and made conclusion in agreement with the point of Collins and Waller.

Some historians who did not align themselves with the 'revisionist school' later openly stated that Stalinist system cannot be regarded as totalitarian. For example, the historian Robert Service in his biography of Stalin wrote that "this was not a totalitarian dictatorship as conventionally defined because Stalin lacked the capacity, even at the height of his power, to secure automatic universal compliance with his wishes." Eric Hobsbawm wrote that although Stalin indeed wanted to achieve total control of the population, he did not establish an actual totalitarian system, what, as he said, "throws considerable doubt on the usefulness of the term."

According to Fitzpatrick, "totalitarian-model scholarship" - the USSR as a "top-down entity," a monolithic party grounded on ideology and ruling by terror over a passive society – "was in effect a mirror image of the Soviet self-representation, but with the moral signs reversed (instead of the party being always right, it was always wrong)." A fact common to the revisionist-school interpretations of the reign of Stalin (1927–1953) was that the USSR was a country with weak social institutions, and that state terrorism against Soviet citizens indicated the political illegitimacy of Stalin's government: to critics of totalitarian model state terror was a mark of a weak government, and J. Arch Getty wrote of a "technically weak and politically divided party whose organizational relationships seem more primitive than totalitarian", commenting the Smolensk Archive, and so, the criticism of accepted model began with labelling Stalinism as "inefficient totalitarianism", where the dictator had to rely on "shock methods" to counter the resistance of local autonomies and administrations and political factionalism within the apparatus (including its highest levels); the citizens of the USSR were not devoid of personal agency or of material resources for living, nor were Soviet citizens psychologically atomized by the totalist ideology of the Communist Party of the Soviet Union—because "the Soviet political system was chaotic, that institutions often escaped the control of the center, and that Stalin's leadership consisted, to a considerable extent, in responding, on an ad hoc basis, to political crises as they arose", and many purges and forced collectivizations were local or even "popular initiatives which Stalin and his henchmen' could not control", while the people collectively resisted by such methods as refusing to work efficiently and migrating by the millions. That the legitimacy of Stalin's régime of government relied upon the popular support of the Soviet citizenry as much as Stalin relied upon state terrorism for their support. That by politically purging Soviet society of anti–Soviet people Stalin created employment and upward social mobility for the post–War generation of working class citizens for whom such socio-economic progress was unavailable before the Russian Revolution (1917–1924). That the people who benefited from Stalin's social engineering became Stalinists loyal to the USSR; thus, the Revolution had fulfilled her promise to those Stalinist citizens and they supported Stalin because of the state terrorism.

The revisionists also conducted new comparative studies of the Third Reich and the USSR, but stressed substantial differences between them. Thus, fascisms lasted much shorter, but experienced cumulative radicalization until their collapse, while Stalinism arose in stabilized and pacified country and fell apart due to an internal crisis after a post-totalitarian period; fascism maintained traditional elites, while Stalinism was a result of revolution and radical social transformation; their ideologies were antipodal; totalitarian model likened "charismatic authorities" of Stalin and Hitler and Mussolini, but they were different: Hitler and Mussolini were popular figures of "providential men" who needed an almost physical contact with the followers and exemplified the totalitarian "New Man" with their bodies and behavior, while Stalin's cult is described as "afar", purely artificial and much more distant, and Stalin never merged with the people, always staying "hidden from his followers". Mass state violence was also different: Soviet violence was primarily internal, while that of the Nazis primarily external; the former was an ineffective and irrational means of a rational goal, modernization, while Nazis sought extremely irrational goals with rational industrial means; the efficiency of Soviet forced labor camps (Gulags) was measured by the authorities by practical results, like building train tracks, which would eventually lay a basis of modernity, while Nazism mobilized industry for extermination, and the efficiency of extermination camps was measured by the number of deaths. Thus, the revisionists have argued, both regimes committed inhumane mass violence, but their internal logic was fundamentally different.

In the case of East Germany, Eli Rubin posited that East Germany was not a totalitarian state but rather a society shaped by the confluence of unique economic and political circumstances interacting with the concerns of ordinary citizens.

=== Nazism and Fascism ===
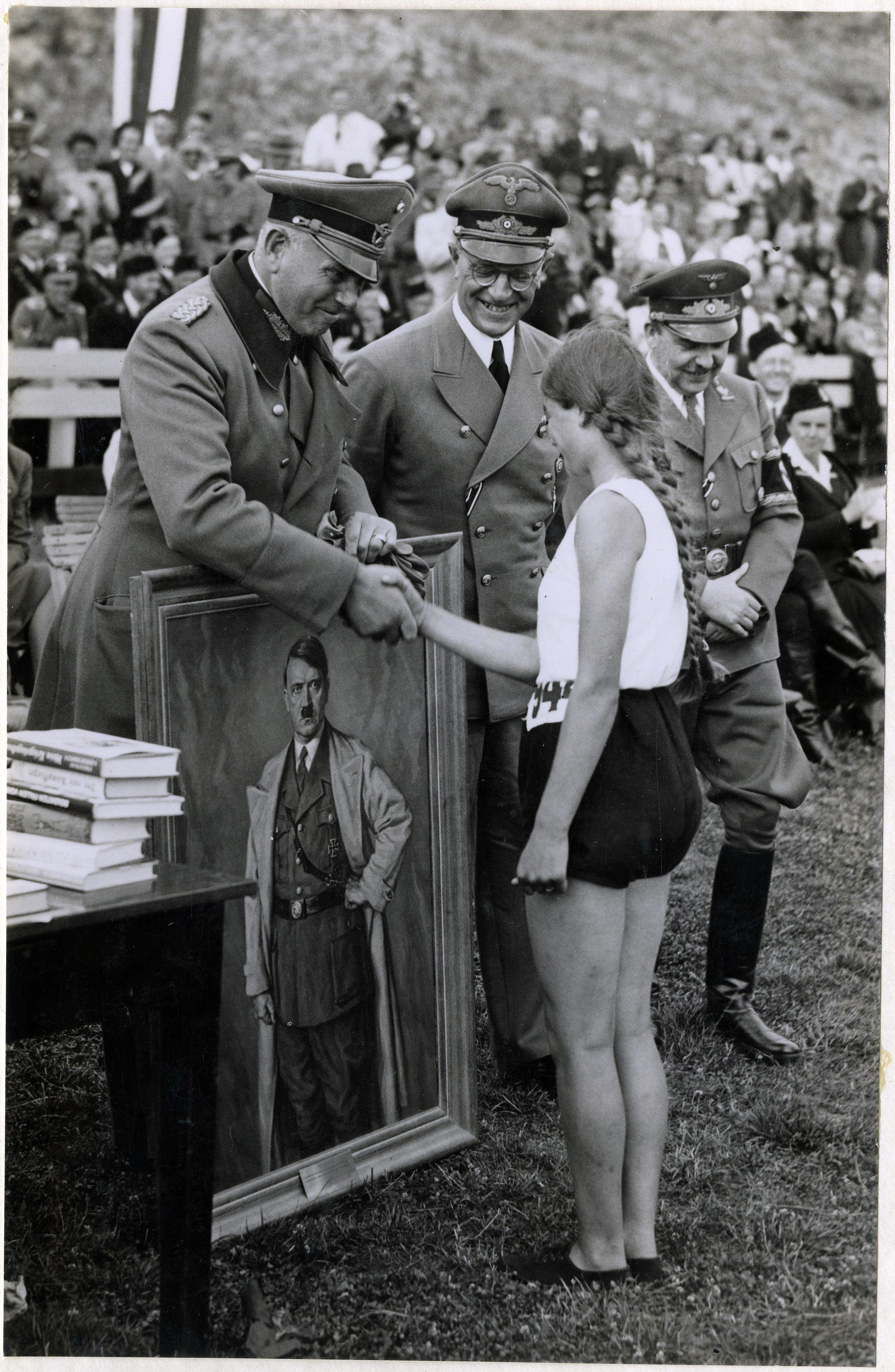
Otto Schumann, Arthur Seyss-Inquart and Fritz Schmidt award a sportswoman with a portrait of Adolf Hitler.

Enzo Traverso and Andrew Vincent point out that the "totalitarian approach" or the theoretical concept of totalitarianism, which presented the idea of a monolithic party, no separation between state and society, and total mobilization of the atomized masses and total control over the state, society and economy, is not applicable not only to the USSR, but also to Nazi Germany and Fascist states as well, since it also did not present a monolithic structure exercising total control over society, but on the contrary, that Nazi bureaucracy was highly "chaotic", anomic and disorganized and disunited, and that Adolf Hitler was a "weak dictator" and a "laissez-faire leader", as said by such historians as Hans Mommsen and Ian Kershaw; this description of Nazi Germany was first introduced in 1942 by Franz Leopold Neumann in the work Behemoth: The Structure and Practice of National Socialism, where he provocatively presented Hitlerism as "a Behemoth, a non-state, a chaos, a rule of lawlessness, disorder, and anarchy", and later entered historiography of Nazism. In the 1970s, the German historians of functionalist school presented Nazism as a "polycratic" system grounded on different centers of power – the Nazi party, the army, the economic elites, and the state bureaucracy; to such historians, totalitarian monolithic state and party were just a facade (similarly to Fitzpatrick's assessment of Stalinism). Historians like Mommsen and Ian Kershaw were critical of concepts of totalitarianism and focused on lack of bureaucratic coherence in the Nazi system and on its immanent tendency towards self-destruction. Michael Mann wrote that these descriptions doubted theories of totalitarianism, since "anything less like the rigid top-down bureaucracy of totalitarian theory is hard to imagine", but that Stalinism and Nazism "belong together", and that "it is only a question of finding the right family name". According to Mann, "totalitarian theorists depicted an unreal level of coherence for any state. Modern states are a long way short of Hegelian or Weberian rational bureaucracy and they rarely act as singular, coherent actors. Normally regimes are factionalized; in an unpredictable world they stumble along with many foul-ups. Second, we should remember Weber's essential point about bureaucracy: it kept politics out of administration. Political and moral values ('value rationality') were settled outside of bureaucratic administration, which then limited itself to finding efficient means of implementing those values ('formal rationality'). Contrary to totalitarian theory, the twentieth-century states most capable of such formally rational bureaucracy were not the dictatorships but the democracies."

The concept of totalitarianism appeared in the debates among German historians and public intellectuals which is known as the Historikerstreit, in which one of the parties defended the idea of exceptionalism of Nazism, while their conservative opponents believed that the Third Reich may be explained through comparison with the USSR; at the same time, such conservative historians as Karl-Dietrich Bracher and Klaus Hildebrand rejected the notion of Nazism as a branch of generic fascism, on the grounds that the uniqueness of Nazism lay in the person and ideology of Hitler and that Nazism was defined primarily by Hitler's personality and personal beliefs rather than by any external factors.

Stanley Payne wrote that indeed, both Mussolini and Hitler failed to achieve full totalitarianism, and of Mussolini it was said that his regime was not totalitarian (excluding "merely fascist" Italy from totalitarian regimes, started by Hannah Arendt who also thought that Nazism became totalitarian only in 1938–1942, is a not unpopular but contested position in contemporary historiography), so Payne concludes that "only a socialist or Communist system can achieve full totalitarianism, since total control requires total institutional revolution that can only be effected by state socialism" (according to Payne, both Lenin and Stalin were totalitarian). Payne writes that "it is easy to argue either that many different kinds of regimes are totalitarian or conversely that none were perfectly total", yet, he writes that the concept "totalitarianism is both valid and useful if defined in the precise and literal sense of a state system that attempts to exercise direct control over all significant aspects of all major national institutions."

=== Further debates ===
==== 1960s - 1970s ====
Jürgen Habermas in a lecture entitled “The Phantom Revolution and its Children” in which he suggests that the extreme voluntarism of the students could not but be characterized as “Left fascist.” Such a characterization becomes the basis for a vitally important exchange of letters between Herbert Marcuse and Theodor W. Adorno, on the left fascism theory and its Imperialist-atlanticist consequence.

==== 1980s - 1990s ====
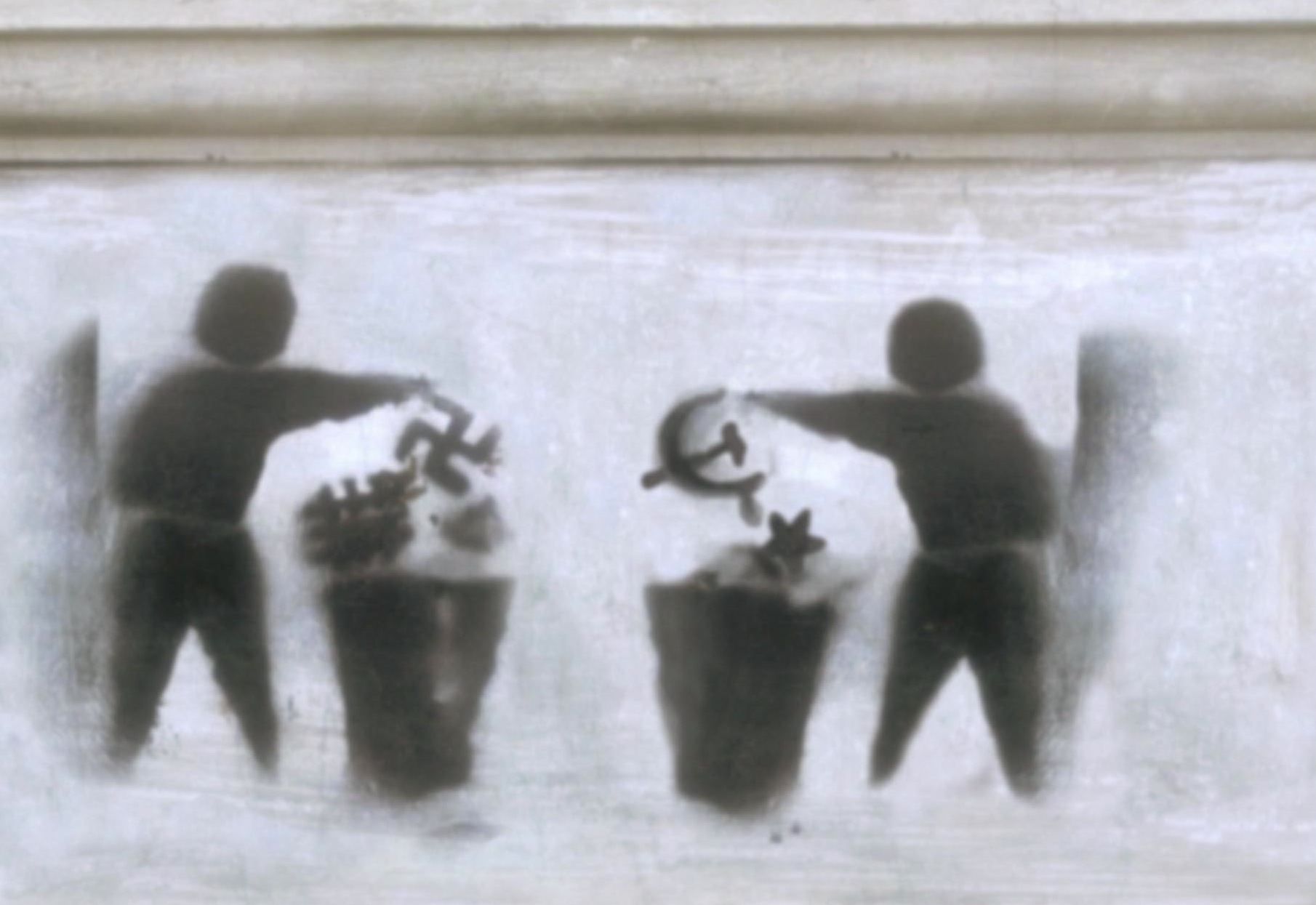
An 'anti-totalitarian' graffiti in Bucharest, Romania, in 2013, equating Communism with Nazism and Iron Guard

Writing in 1987, Walter Laqueur dismissed the arguments of revisionists as "reappraisals of Stalin and Stalinism" and compared them with German 'revisionist' historians of Nazism, particularly Ernst Nolte, whom he did not distinguish from functionalist historians of Nazism ("weak dictator" thesis), and called their analysis "Marxist", for which Stalin was "not promising material". As Laqueur wrote, the historians who disagreed with the revisionists "still ha[d] very strong feelings" towards Stalinism and found concepts such as modernization inadequate tools for explaining Soviet history, unlike the concept of totalitarianism; citing Mikhail Gorbachev using the term "totalitarianism", Laqueur wrote that the efforts of the revisionists to abolish the totalitarian model "ha[d] become difficult."

Laure Neumayer posited that "despite the disputes over its heuristic value and its normative assumptions, the concept of totalitarianism made a vigorous return to the political and academic fields at the end of the Cold War". In 1978, the term was 'revived' in Western Europe: such historians as François Furet produced 'revisionist' critical re-evaluations of the French Revolution which, according to them, led to the emergence of totalitarianism, while in Italy, "anti-anti-Fascist" historians, notably Renzo De Felice and after him Emilio Gentile, challenged the 'myth' produced by the hegemonic role of the Communists in the Italian resistance, stated that the choice between Fascism and Communism was equal for Italy, and implied that the latter could be even worse, what led to the resurgence of the concept of totalitarianism as a new dimension of studies of Fascism, while the ones who doubted their theories were "swept away" with the collapse of the Eastern Bloc between 1989 and 1991. The 'revival' of the concept which started in the 1970s in Europe took some time to re-appear in English-language literature, as the 'revisionists' achieved hegemony in the academy, while the 'totalitarians' retained control over public discourse; the European debates were transferred to English-language historiography by Martin Malia. In 1995, Furet made a comparative analysis and used the term totalitarian twins to link Nazism and Stalinism. Pipes and Malia continued depicting ideological developments as the grounds of communism, and thus, totalitarianism, drawing a line from utopianism and the French Revolution, which Pipes compared to a "virus", to Lenin, and to describe the nature of totalitarianism, they used the concept of ideocracy. Furet and Ernst Nolte, a historian praised by Furet, also identified anti-Fascism as Communist totalitarianism; Nolte presented a conflict between totalitarianisms as European Civil War, stating that it was begun by Bolshevism and produced Nazism, an "inverted Bolshevism", thus assessing the latter as only a response to the threat of Bolshevism and the Holocaust and Operation Barbarossa as "both a retaliation and a preventive measure" against Bolshevism. Another major work belonging to the same period was The Black Book of Communism (1997), the editor of which, Stephane Courtois, stressed structural homology of totalitarian systems embodied in identity of "class genocide" of Communism and "race genocide" of Nazism, and concluded that Communism was more murderous than Nazism or any other ideology from counting and summing the number of victims that can be attributed to 'Communist states' and thus communism in general, what triggered an emotional debate in France on whether Communism should be treated as a single unified phenomena and whether "a blanket condemnation" of Communism as an ideology makes sense. While Nolte and the historians supporting him were not victorious in the Historikerstreit, but his influence on Furet and the historians outside Germany legitimized his ideas, and they returned to Germany in other forms, what thus led to the resurgence of the concept in Germany. The concept entered historiography in Eastern Europe, in former countries of the Eastern Bloc, describing not only Stalinism, but the whole Communist project in general along with the "Double genocide theory", a form of Holocaust trivialization which summarized Nazi and Stalinist violence into a single metanarrative and became an influential framework of interpretation.

Furet's totalitarian interpretation of the French Revolution, directed against the classic "Marxist" or "Jacobin" interpretation, triggered debates with such historians as Michel Vovelle, who led new studies on it; as Eric Hobsbawm concluded in 2007, "the Furet Revolution" was "now over". In regards to Furet's ideas on the 20th century, Hobsbawm wrote that "[Nazism and Stalinism] were functionally and not ideologically derived [...] Furet, as a distinguished historian of ideas, knows that they belonged to different if structurally convergent taxonomic families"; contrary to conception of anti-Fascism as a mask of Stalinism, Hobsbawm attributed the "alliance" between liberalism and communism, which had enabled capitalism to overcome its crisis, and wrote that Furet's work "reads like a belated product of the Cold War era". Historians Enzo Traverso and Arno J. Mayer and the author Domenico Losurdo accepted Nolte's concept of the "European Civil War", although set its beginning to 1914 and differently interpreted it, not in terms of struggle between two totalitarianisms.

Michael Parenti (1997) and James Petras (1999) have suggested that the totalitarianism concept has been politically employed and used for anti-communist purposes. Parenti has also analysed how "left anti-communists" attacked the Soviet Union during the Cold War. For Petras, the CIA funded the Congress for Cultural Freedom to attack "Stalinist anti-totalitarianism."

According to some scholars and authors, such as Domenico Losurdo calling Joseph Stalin totalitarian instead of authoritarian has been asserted to be a high-sounding but specious excuse for Western self-interest, just as surely as the counterclaim that allegedly debunking the totalitarian concept may be a high-sounding but specious excuse for Russian self-interest. For Losurdo, totalitarianism is a polysemic concept with origins in Christian theology and applying it to the political sphere requires an operation of abstract schematism which makes use of isolated elements of historical reality to place fascist regimes and the Soviet Union in the dock together, serving the anti-communism of Cold War-era intellectuals rather than reflecting intellectual research.

==== After the 1990s ====
After 1990s, criticisms of totalitarianism as a historical concept and a tool of analysis continued; however, while these critics called for expulsion of the concept from academic field, they stated that its legitimate outside it. Hans Mommsen criticized it as "a descriptive concept, not a theory" with "little or no explanatory power": "But the basis of comparison is a shallow one, largely confined to the apparatus of rule." However, he wrote that "the totalitarianism concept allows comparative analysis of a number of techniques and instruments of domination, and this, too, must be seen as legitimate in itself", and that it is legitimate in "non-scholarly usage". Enzo Traverso in his essay "Totalitarianism Between History and Theory" (2017) dismisses the term as "both useless and irreplaceable" for political science and academic history and cites Franz Leopold Neumann who called it a Weberian "ideal type", an abstraction that does not exist in reality as opposed to concrete totality of history, and believes it to be a term of abuse in Western political science and propaganda, he writes about its legitimacy for storing traumatic collective experience of the 20th century state violence:

Thus, if the concept of totalitarianism continues to be criticized for its ambiguities, weaknesses, and abuses, it probably will not be abandoned. Beyond being a Western banner, it stores the memory of a century that experienced Auschwitz and Kolyma, the death camps of Nazism, the Stalinist Gulags, and Pol Pot's killing fields. There lies its legitimacy, which does not need any academic recognition.

In the essay, "Totalitarianism: Defunct Theory, Useful Word" (2010), the historian John Connelly said that totalitarianism is a useful word, but that the old 1950s theory about totalitarianism is defunct among scholars, because "The word is as functional now as it was fifty years ago. It means the kind of régime that existed in Nazi Germany, the Soviet Union, the Soviet satellites, Communist China, and maybe Fascist Italy, where the word originated. . . . Who are we to tell Václav Havel or Adam Michnik that they were fooling themselves when they perceived their rulers as totalitarian? Or, for that matter, any of the millions of former subjects of Soviet-type rule who use the local equivalents of the Czech [word] totalita to describe the systems they lived under before 1989? [Totalitarianism] is a useful word, and everyone knows what it means as a general referent. Problems arise when people confuse the useful descriptive term with the old 'theory' from the 1950s."

== Politics ==
=== Early usages ===
==== Self-description of autocracies ====
The term "totalitarian" was used by leaders and top officials of right-wing and far-right dictatorships and autocracies established during the interwar period and World War II to describe their regimes—most notably by Benito Mussolini of Fascist Italy. Among the Soviet Union (USSR), Nazi Germany, and Fascist Italy, it became an official self-description only in the case of Fascist Italy; it was also used in Nazi Germany but to a lesser extent, and it was not used at all by the USSR—this pattern was later reversed by theorists of totalitarianism who viewed the USSR as a prime example. Therefore, the meaning of the term as used in the self-descriptions by fascists differed from its post-World War II interpretations.

In 1923, early in the reign of Mussolini's government (1922–1943), the anti-fascist academic Giovanni Amendola defined and described totalitarianism as a form of government in which a supreme leader personally exercises total power (i.e., political, military, economic, and social) as Il Duce of the state. Italian fascism was a political system with an ideological, utopian worldview that was unlike the realistic politics of a personal dictatorship, which holds power for the sake of holding power. The term "totalitarian" became used by Italian fascists themselves: later, theoretician of Italian fascism Giovanni Gentile ascribed politically positive meanings to the terms totalitarianism and totalitarian in defence of Duce Mussolini's legal, illegal, and legalistic social engineering of Italy. As ideologues, the intellectual Gentile and the politician Mussolini used the term totalitario to identify and describe the ideological nature of Italian societal structures and the practical economic, geopolitical, and social goals of the new Fascist Italy, which was the "total representation of the nation and total guidance of national goals." In proposing the totalitarian society of Italian fascism, Gentile described a civil society wherein totalitarian ideology (i.e., subservience to the state) determined the public sphere and the private sphere of the Italian nation. To achieve a fascist utopia, Italian totalitarianism needed to politicize human existence into state subservience, which Mussolini summarized with the epigram: "Everything within the state, nothing outside the state, nothing against the state."

Hannah Arendt, in her book The Origins of Totalitarianism, contended that Mussolini's dictatorship was not a totalitarian regime until 1938. Arguing that one of the key characteristics of a totalitarian movement was its ability to garner mass mobilization, Arendt wrote:

"While all political groups depend upon proportionate strength, totalitarian movements depend on the sheer force of numbers to such an extent that totalitarian regimes seem impossible, even under otherwise favorable circumstances, in countries with relatively small populations.... [E]ven Mussolini, who was so fond of the term "totalitarian state," did not attempt to establish a full-fledged totalitarian regime and contented himself with dictatorship and one-party rule."

For example, Victor Emmanuel III still reigned as a figurehead and helped play a role in the dismissal of Mussolini in 1943. Additionally, the Catholic Church was allowed to independently exercise its religious authority in the Vatican City, per the 1929 Lateran Treaty, under the leadership of Pope Pius XI (1922–1939) and Pope Pius XII (1939–1958).

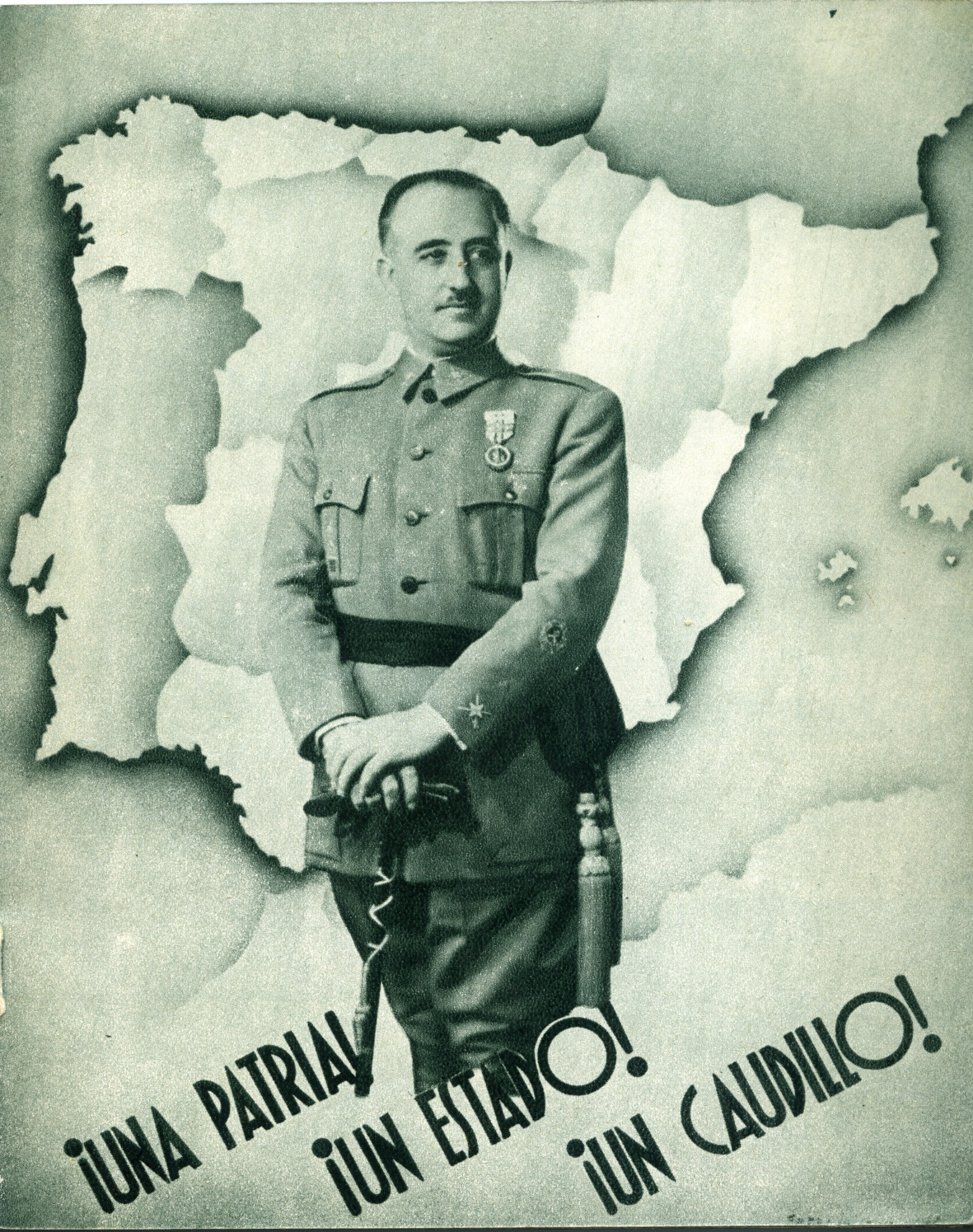
A 1937 propaganda image featuring Francisco Franco and his motto Una patria! Un estado! Un caudillo! resembling the Nazi motto Ein Volk, ein Reich, ein Führer. During the Spanish Civil War, Franco proclaimed that his Spanish State would be modelled after "other countries of totalitarian regimes", these being Nazi Germany and Fascist Italy.

As the Nazi Party rose to power in 1933, it began using the concept of a totalitarian state propagated by Mussolini and Carl Schmitt to characterize its ideal regime. Joseph Goebbels stated in a 1933 speech: "Our party has always aspired to the totalitarian state. […] the goal of the revolution [National Socialist] has to be a totalitarian state that penetrates into all spheres of public life." However, the concept of totalitarianism was downplayed among Nazi ideologues, who preferred the term Volksstaat ('people's state' or 'racial state') to describe said regime.

José María Gil-Robles y Quiñones, the leader of Spanish Confederation of the Autonomous Right (CEDA), declared his intention to "give Spain a true unity, a new spirit, a totalitarian polity". He went on to say: "Democracy is not an end but a means to the conquest of the new state. When the time comes, either parliament submits or we will eliminate it." General Francisco Franco was determined to prevent the growth of competing right-wing parties in Spain, and CEDA was dissolved in April 1937. Later, Gil-Robles went into exile.

Franco began applying "totalitarian" to his regime during the Spanish Civil War (1936–1939). On 1 October 1936, he announced his intent to organize Spain "within a broad totalitarian concept of unity and continuity"; practical realization of this began with the forced unification of all parties of the Nationalist zone into FET y de las JONS, the sole governing party of the new state. Afterward, he and his ideologues stressed the similarly "missionary and totalitarian" nature of the state under construction vis-à-vis Nazi Germany and Fascist Italy, and totalitarianism was described as an essentially Spanish way of government. In December 1942, as World War II progressed, Franco stopped using the term, and it received a negative connotation as Franco called for a struggle with "Bolshevist totalitarianism."

Ioannis Metaxas, the leader of the 4th of August Regime in Greece, which took some inspiration from fascism, wrote in his diary that he had established "an anti-communist, anti-parliamentary state, a totalitarian state, a state based on agriculture and labour, and therefore anti-plutocratic". After the Italian and German invasions of Greece, he wrote that "by beating Greece, they were beating what their flag stood for." Although Metaxas did not create a one-party state, he believed that the whole of the Greek people—the nation—constituted said party, excluding any real or hypothetical communists, reactionaries, or democrats.

Ion Antonescu, the Axis-aligned dictator of the Kingdom of Romania during World War II, described his regime as "ethnocratic" and "ethnic Christian" and as "the national-totalitarian regime, the regime of national and social restoration"—devoted to the ideology of an extreme Romanian nationalism and Romanian heritage. It enacted antisemitic and racist legislation and was active in perpetrating the Holocaust; however, in 1941, Antonescu dissolved the ruling party, the Iron Guard, denounced its terrorist methods, and continued his rule without a single-party system. The regime also spared half of resident Romanian Jews during its existence.

In 1940, then-foreign minister of the Empire of Japan Matsuoka Yosuke expressed in an interview the ideological assumptions prevailing within the Shōwa statist government: "In the battle between democracy and totalitarianism the latter adversary will without question win and will control the world. The era of democracy is finished and the democratic system bankrupt... Fascism will develop in Japan through the people's will. It will come out of love for the Emperor." A document produced by the government's cabinet-planning board pointed out that, "since the founding of our country, Japan has had an unparalleled totalitarianism... an ideal totalitarianism is manifest in our national polity... Germany's totalitarianism has existed for only eight years, but Japanese [totalitarianism] has shone through 3,000 years of ageless tradition".

==== Criticism and analysis ====
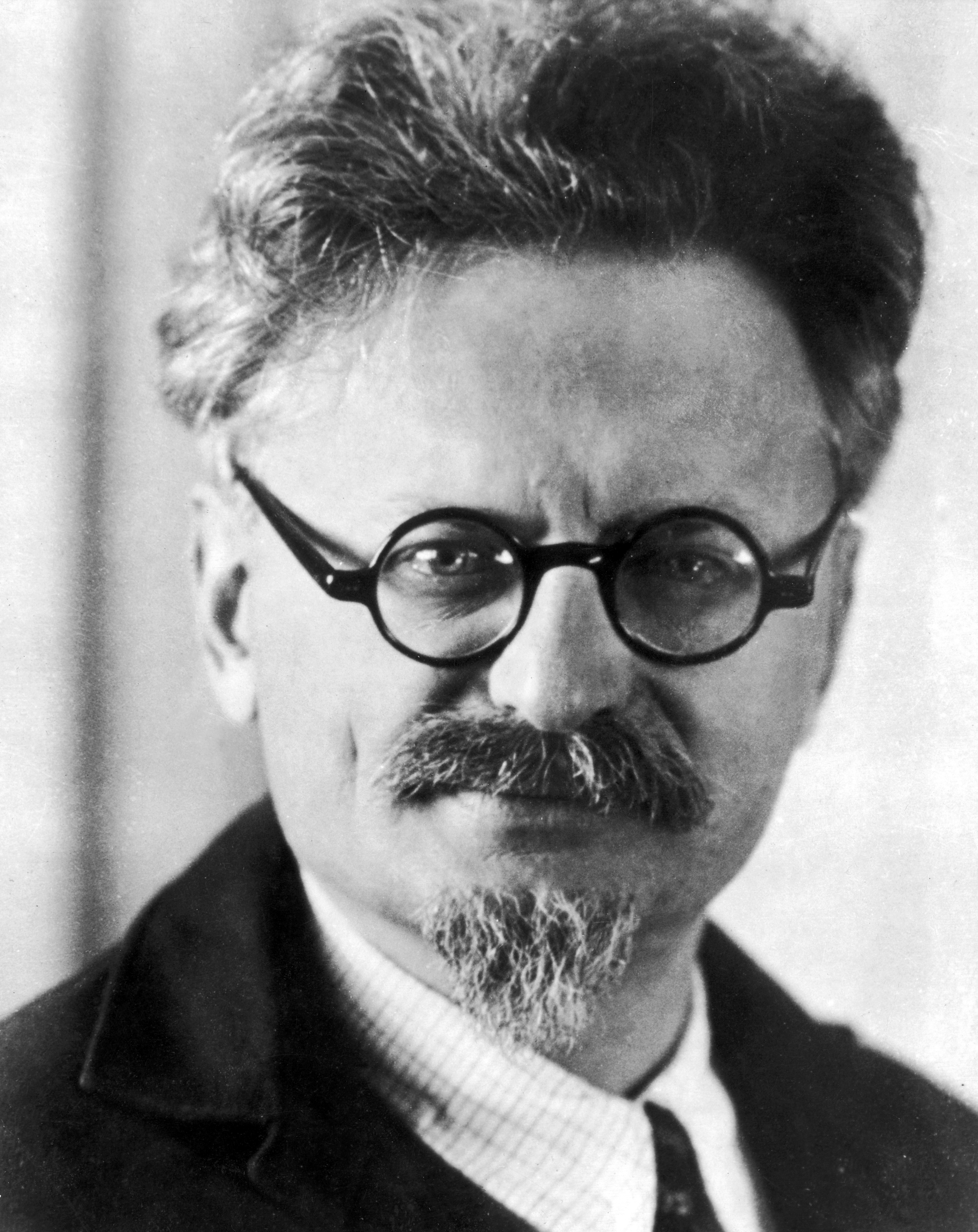
Leon Trotsky formulated a concept of totalitarianism in his analysis of the USSR in the 1930s.

In the interwar period, totalitarianism emerged as a term used to criticize and analyze the dictatorships of the time. It was used to describe fascism and later became a ground for comparing fascist states to the Soviet Union; it was not understood as an element of a liberal–totalitarian dichotomy or as the inverse of liberal democracy.

By the 1930s, left-wing critics of Stalinism began applying the term to the Soviet state and using it in comparison to fascist states. Leon Trotsky was one of the first to do so, producing perhaps the most famous example of such usage by a left-wing anti-Stalinist dissident. The first to direct the term toward the USSR was writer and left-wing activist Victor Serge, who did so shortly before his arrest in a letter published in France. Also that year, Trotsky compared fascist and Soviet bureaucracies, describing both as parasitic, and later stated that "in the last period, the Soviet bureaucracy has familiarized itself with many traits of victorious fascism, first of all by getting rid of the control of the party and establishing the cult of the leader." In The Revolution Betrayed (1936), Trotsky used "totalitarian" to analyse the USSR, attributing to totalitarianism—rooted in "the dilatoriness of the world proletariat in solving the problems set for it by history"—such features as concentration of power in the hands of a single individual, the abolition of popular control over the leadership, the use of extreme repression, and the elimination of contending loci of power. Later, he included "the suppression of all freedom to criticize; the subjection of the accused to the military; examining magistrates, a prosecutor and judge in one; a monolithic press whose howlings terrorize the accused and hypnotize public opinion". Trotsky wrote that the USSR "had become totalitarian" in character several years before the word arrived from Germany. However, his concept was much less defined than those of the Cold War theorists, and he would have disagreed with their core points—e.g., that "central control and direction of the entire economy" applied to fascism—and would have rejected their tendency to depict totalitarian societies as politically monolithic and inherently static, as well as their anti-communist perspective and description of Lenin as a totalitarian dictator. Scholars have argued that for him it was a pejorative, not a sociological concept based on equating fascism and socialism like it was for Cold War theorists.

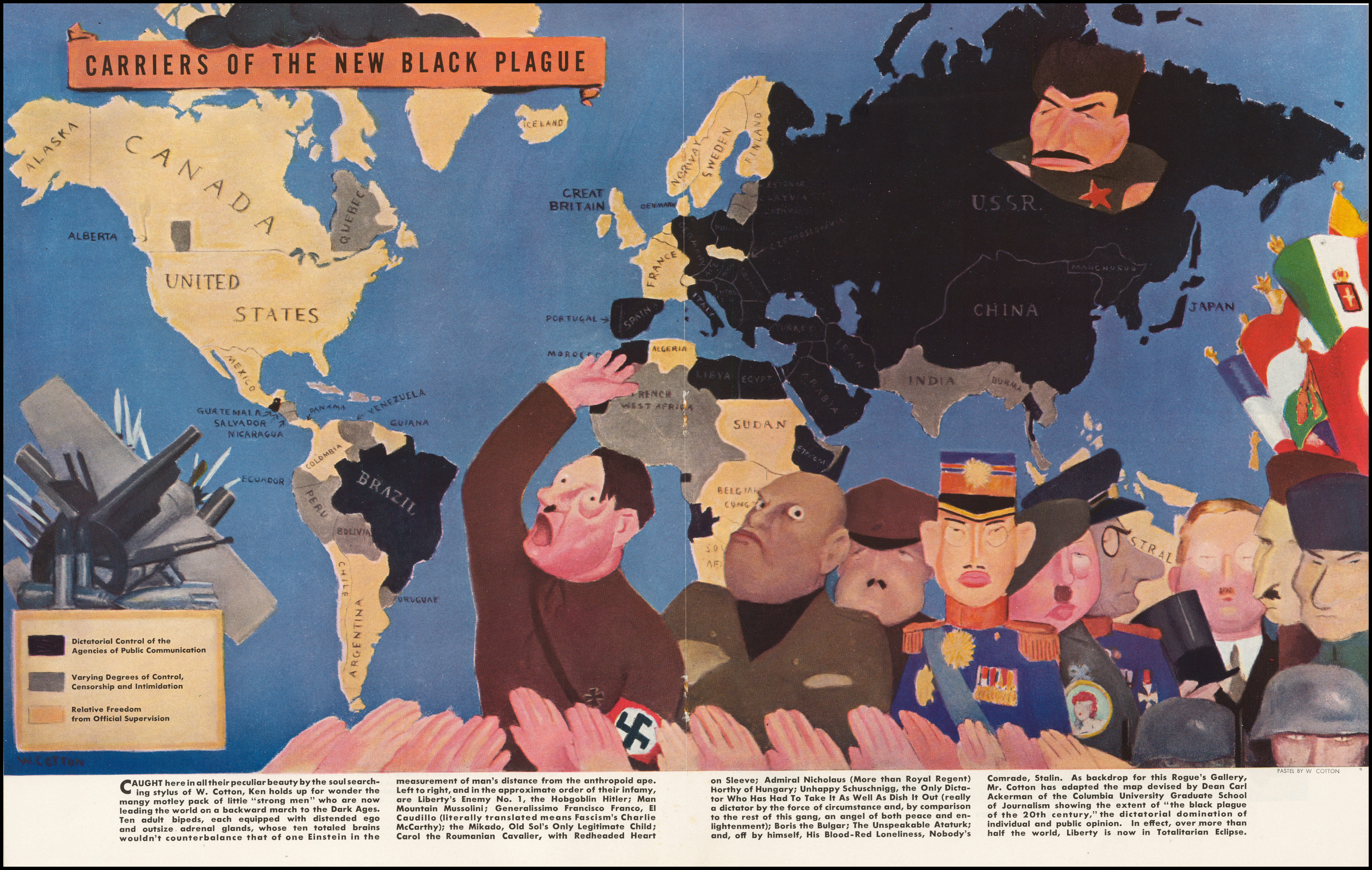
1938 satirical illustration "Carriers of the New Black Plague" by William Cotton; the caption mentions "Totalitarian Eclipse" threatening democracy.

One of the uses of totalitarianism in English was by Austrian writer Franz Borkenau in his 1938 book The Communist International, in which he commented that it united the Soviet and German dictatorships more than it divided them. The label totalitarian was twice affixed to Nazi Germany during Winston Churchill's speech of 5 October 1938 before the House of Commons of the United Kingdom, in opposition to the Munich Agreement, by which France and Great Britain consented to Nazi Germany's annexation of the Sudetenland. Churchill was then a backbencher member of parliament representing the Epping constituency. In a radio address two weeks later, Churchill again employed the term, this time applying the concept to "a communist or a Nazi tyranny."

The concept gained legitimacy in 1939 with the Molotov–Ribbentrop Pact, after which it became accepted, at least until 1941, to present Stalin and Hitler as "twin dictators" and call Nazism "brown Bolshevism" and Stalinism "red fascism". The same year, scholars of various disciplines held the first international symposium on totalitarianism in Philadelphia. The concept was abandoned in 1941 as the Third Reich invaded the USSR, and the latter became depicted in Western propaganda as a "valiant freedom-loving" ally in the war. Among the major productions of pro-Stalinist Western propaganda was the film Mission to Moscow (1943), based on the 1941 book of the same name.

In the aftermath of the Second World War, in a lecture series (1945) and book (1946) titled The Soviet Impact on the Western World, the British historian E. H. Carr contended that "the trend away from individualism and towards totalitarianism [was] everywhere unmistakable" in the then-decolonising countries of Eurasia. He noted that revolutionary Marxism–Leninism was the most successful type of totalitarianism, as proved by the USSR's revolutionary rapid industrialization (1929–1941) and the Great Patriotic War (1941–1945) that defeated Nazi Germany. Despite those achievements in social engineering and warfare, in dealing with the countries of the communist bloc, only the "blind and incurable" ideologue could ignore the communist régimes' trend towards police-state totalitarianism.

Politically matured by having fought and been wounded in and survived the Spanish Civil War, in the essay "Why I Write" (1946), the democratic socialist George Orwell writes: "the Spanish war and other events in 1936–37 turned the scale and thereafter I knew where I stood. Every line of serious work that I have written since 1936 has been written, directly or indirectly, against totalitarianism and for democratic socialism, as I understand it." He argued that future totalitarian régimes would spy upon their societies and use mass communications media to perpetuate their dictatorships, and that "if you want a vision of the future, imagine a boot stamping on a human face—forever."

=== Cold War ===
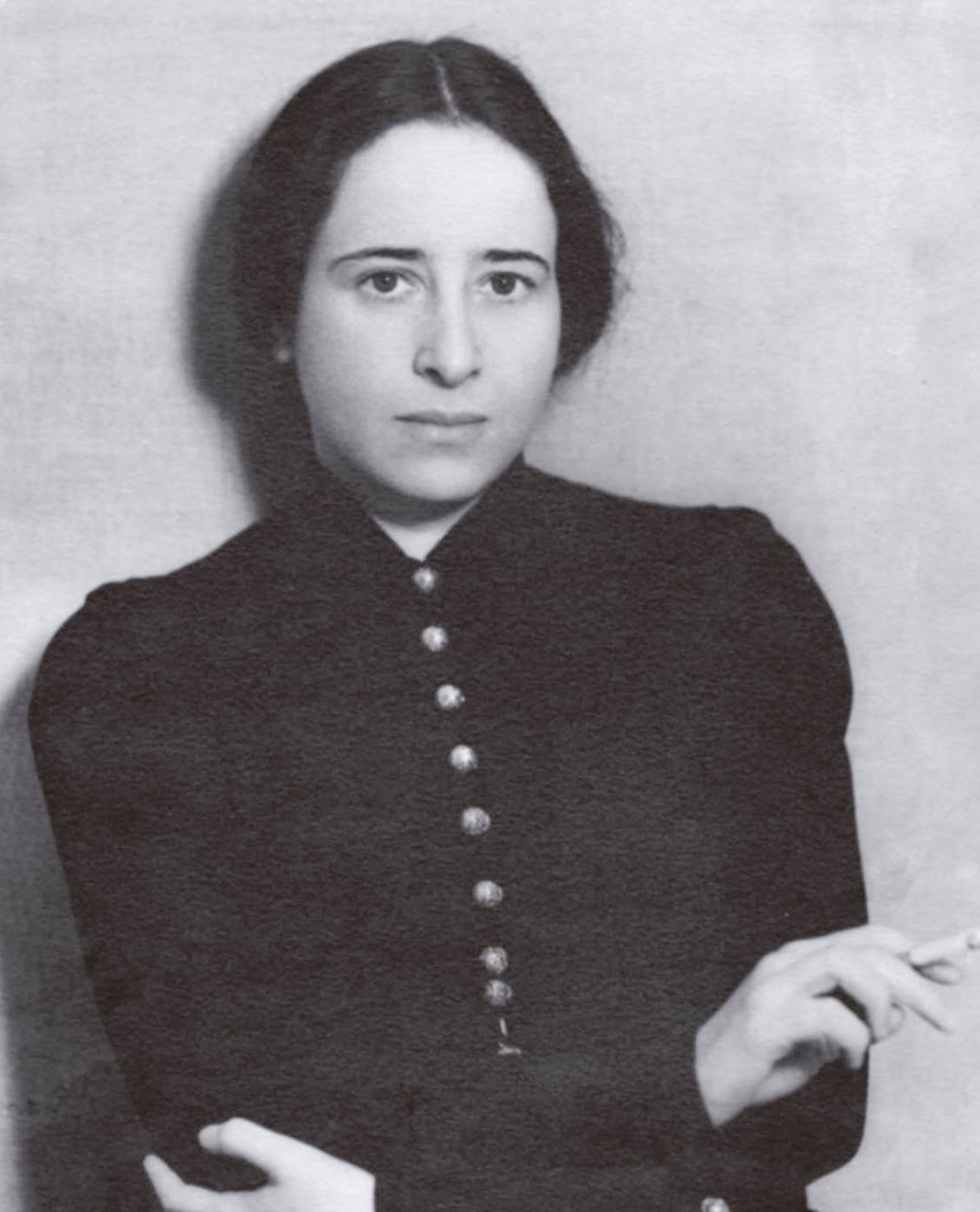
Anti-totalitarian: Hannah Arendt thwarted the totalitarian model Kremlinologists who sought to co-opt the thesis of The Origins of Totalitarianism (1951) as American anti–Communist propaganda that claimed that every Communist state was of the totalitarian model.

In The Origins of Totalitarianism (1951), political theorist Hannah Arendt writes that, in their infancy in the early 20th century, corporatist Nazism and Soviet communism were novel forms of government, not updated versions of the old tyrannies of military or a corporate dictatorships. She argues that the human emotional comfort of political certainty is the source of the mass appeal of revolutionary totalitarian régimes, given that the totalitarian worldview offers psychologically comforting, definitive answers to the complex socio-political mysteries of the past, present, and future. Thus, Nazism proposed that all history is the history of ethnic conflict, of the survival of the fittest race. In contrast, Marxism–Leninism proposed that all history is the history of class conflict, of the survival of the fittest social class. Thus, upon the believers' acceptance of the universal applicability of totalitarian ideology, the Nazi revolutionary and the communist revolutionary then possessed the simplistic moral certainty with which to justify all other actions by the state, either by an appeal to historicism or by an appeal to nature, as expedient actions necessary to establish an authoritarian state apparatus.

==== True belief ====
In The True Believer (1951), Eric Hoffer writes that political mass movements, such as Italian Fascism (1922–1943), German Nazism (1933–1945), and Russian Stalinism (1929–1953), featured the common political praxis of negatively comparing their totalitarian society as culturally superior to the morally decadent societies of democratic countries of Western Europe. Such mass psychology indicates that participating in and joining a political mass movement offers individuals the prospect of a glorious future, and that such membership in a community is an emotional refuge for those with few real-world accomplishments. The 'true believer', then, is assimilated into a collective body of other true believers who are psychologically protected with "fact-proof screens from reality" drawn from the official texts of the totalitarian ideology.

==== Collaborationism ====
In a 2018 article titled "European Protestants Between Anti-Communism and Anti-Totalitarianism: The Other Interwar Kulturkampf?", historian Paul Hanebrink writes that Hitler's assumption of power in Germany in 1933 frightened Christians into anti-communism because, for European Christians—Catholic and Protestant alike—the culture war crystallized as a struggle against communism. Throughout the European interwar period (1918–1939), right-wing totalitarian régimes indoctrinated Christians into demonizing the communist régime in Russia as the apotheosis of secular materialism and as a militarized threat to worldwide Christian social and moral order. Throughout Europe, Christians who became anti-communist totalitarians perceived communism and communist governments as existential threats to the moral order of their respective societies, and they collaborated with Nazi leadership and other fascists in the hope that anti-communism would restore the societies of Europe to a form of Christendom.

==== Totalitarian model ====
In late-1950s American geopolitics, totalitarianism, totalitarian, and the "totalitarian model", from Carl Joachim Friedrich and Zbigniew Brzezinski's Totalitarian Dictatorship and Autocracy (1956), became common in U.S. foreign policy. The totalitarian model became a key paradigm for Kremlinology—the study of the USSR's police state. Kremlinologists analyzed internal politics (policy and personality) of the Politburo of the Communist Party of the Soviet Union to craft national and foreign policy, providing strategic intelligence about the USSR. The U.S. also used the model to approach fascist regimes, such as banana republics. As anti-communist political scientists, Friedrich and Brzezinski described totalitarianism with a model of six interlocking, mutually supporting characteristics, including:

1. An elaborate guiding ideology
2. A one-party state
3. Use of state terrorism
4. A monopoly on the control of weapons
5. A monopoly on the control of mass media
6. A centrally directed and controlled planned economy

==== Criticism and evolution of the totalitarian model ====
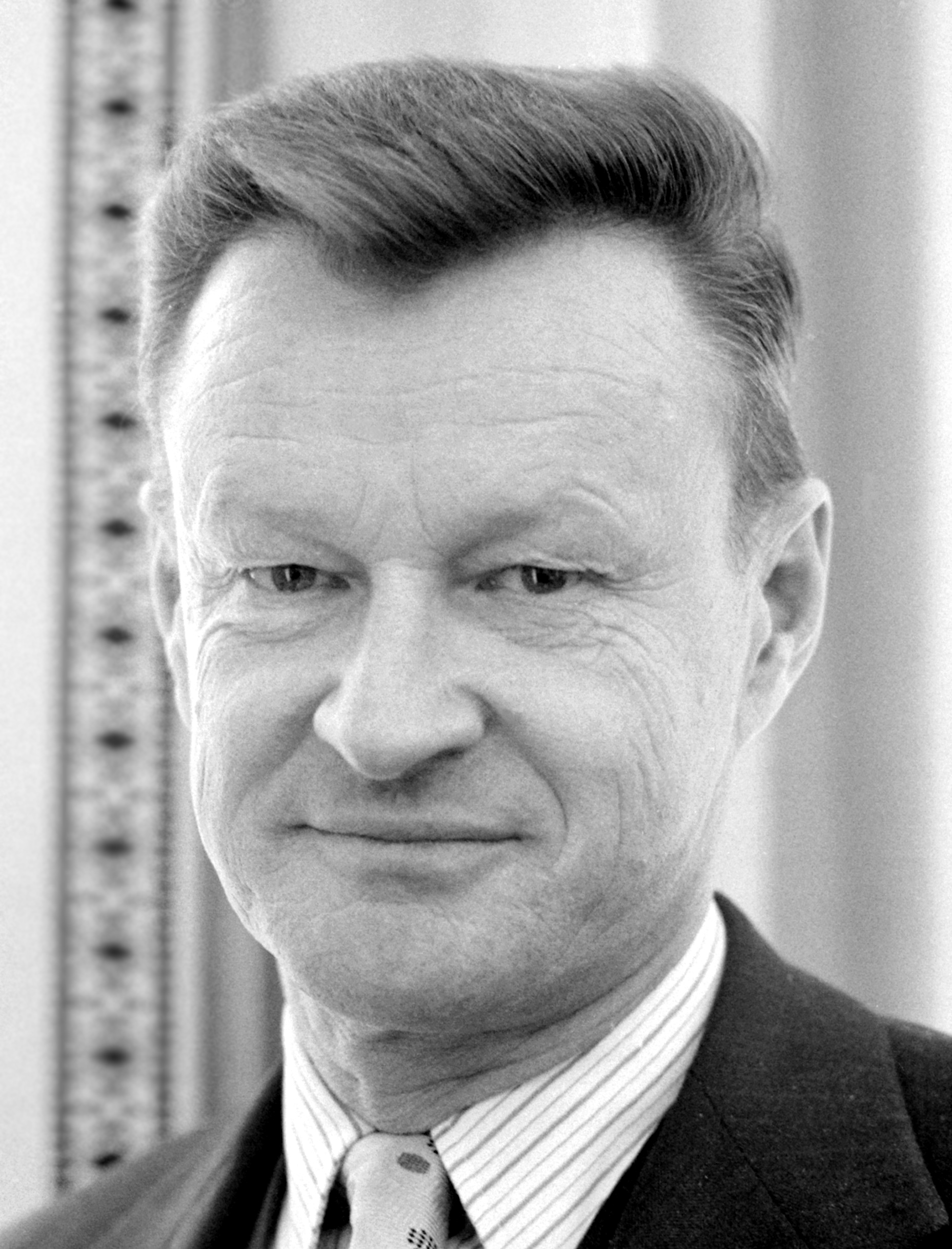
The American political scientist Zbigniew Brzezinski popularized combating left-wing totalitarianism in U.S. foreign policy, and he served as United States National Security Advisor to President Jimmy Carter.

As traditionalist historians, Friedrich and Brzezinski argued that the totalitarian régimes of the USSR (1917), Fascist Italy (1922–1943), and Nazi Germany (1933–1945) originated from political discontent in the socioeconomic aftermath of the First World War (1914–1918), which rendered impotent the government of Weimar Germany (1918–1933) to resist and quell extremist sentiment and actions of pro-totalitarian groups. Revisionist historians criticized the totalitarian model for its inability to fully describe Soviet and Russian history. They argued that Friedrich and Brzezinski overlooked how the Soviet social system functioned both as a political entity (the USSR) and as a social entity (Soviet civil society). This social system could be understood through socialist class struggles among professional elites—political, academic, artistic, scientific, and military—seeking upward mobility into the nomenklatura, the ruling class. Revisionists pointed out that the Politburo's political economy allowed for some executive power to be delegated to regional authorities for policy implementation. They viewed this as evidence that a totalitarian regime adapts its economy to new demands from civil society. Traditionalist historians, however, saw the USSR's political and economic collapse as proof that the totalitarian economic system failed because the Politburo did not incorporate genuine popular participation in the economy.

The historian of Nazi Germany Karl Dietrich Bracher noted that the "totalitarian typology" developed by Friedrich and Brzezinski was an inflexible one because it did not include the revolutionary dynamics of bellicose people committed to realizing the violent revolution required to establish totalitarianism in a sovereign state. Bracher argued that the essence of totalitarianism is total control to remake every aspect of civil society using a universal ideology—which is interpreted by an authoritarian leader—to create a collective national identity by merging civil society into the state. Given that the supreme leaders of the communist, fascist, and Nazi total states did possess government administrators, Bracher contends that a totalitarian government did not necessarily require an actual supreme leader, and could function by way of collective leadership. The American historian Walter Laqueur agreed that Bracher's totalitarian typology more accurately described the functional reality of the politburo than did the totalitarian typology proposed by Friedrich and Brzezinski.

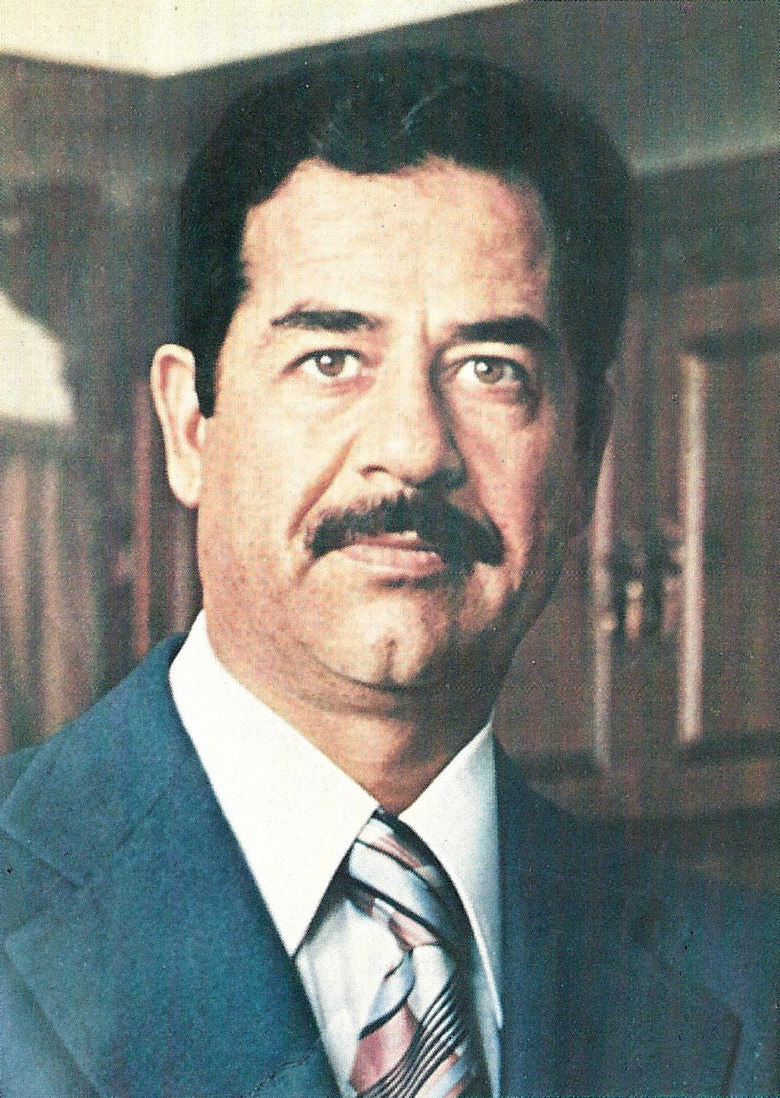
Ba'athist Iraq under Saddam Hussein was a totalitarian state.

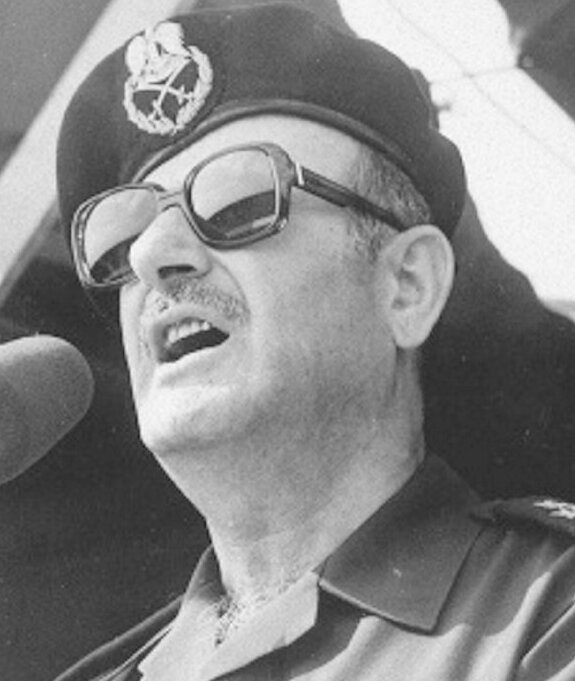
Dynasty of totalitarians: Ba'athist Syria was ruled by the generational dictatorships of Hafez al-Assad (r. 1971–2000) and his son Bashar al-Assad (r. 2000 – 2024) between the late Cold War in the 1970s until 2024.

In Democracy and Totalitarianism (1968), the political scientist Raymond Aron writes that for a régime to be considered totalitarian, it can be characterized by the presence of five mutually supportive characteristics:

1. A one-party state, wherein the ruling party has a monopoly on all political activity.
2. A state ideology upheld by the ruling party that is given official status as the only authority.
3. A state monopoly on information—control of the mass communications media to broadcast the official truth.
4. A state-controlled economy featuring major economic entities under state control.
5. An ideological police-state terror organization and criminalization of political, economic, and professional activities.

In a 1980 review of How the Soviet Union is Governed (1979) by Jerry F. Hough and Merle Fainsod, scholar of authoritarianism William Zimmerman writes: "the Soviet Union has changed substantially. Our knowledge of the Soviet Union has changed, as well. We all know that the traditional paradigm [of the totalitarian model] no longer satisfies [our ignorance], despite several efforts, primarily in the early 1960s (the directed society, totalitarianism without police terrorism, the system of conscription) to articulate an acceptable variant [of Communist totalitarianism]. We have come to realize that models which were, in effect, offshoots of totalitarian models do not provide good approximations of post–Stalinist reality [of the USSR]." In a book review of Totalitarian Space and the Destruction of Aura (2019) by Saladdin Ahmed, Michael Scott Christofferson writes that Hannah Arendt's interpretation of the USSR after Stalin was her attempt to intellectually distance her work from "the Cold War misuse of the concept [of the origins of totalitarianism]" as anti-communist propaganda.

=== Kremlinology ===
During the Cold War (1945–1989), the academic field of Kremlinology (analysing Politburo of the Communist Party of the Soviet Union policies and politics) produced historical and policy analyses dominated by the totalitarian model of the USSR as a police state controlled by the absolute power of the supreme leader Stalin, who headed a monolithic, centralized hierarchy of government. The study of the internal politics of the Politburo's crafting of policy in the Kremlin produced two schools of historiography of the Cold War: traditionalist Kremlinology and revisionist Kremlinology. Traditionalist Kremlinologists worked with and for the totalitarian model and produced interpretations of Kremlin politics and policies that supported the police-state portrait of communist Russia. The revisionist Kremlinologists presented alternative interpretations of Kremlin politics and reported the effects of Politburo policies on Soviet society, both civilian and military. Despite the limitations of police-state historiography, revisionist Kremlinologists argued that the old image of Stalinist Russia of the 1950s—a totalitarian state intent on world domination—was oversimplified and inaccurate, given that Stalin's death changed Soviet society. After the Cold War and the dissolution of the Warsaw Pact, most revisionist Kremlinologists worked in the national archives of post-communist states, especially the State Archive of the Russian Federation on Soviet-era period Russia.

==== Totalitarian model as an official policy ====
In the 1950s, the political scientist Carl Joachim Friedrich argued that communist states, such as Soviet Russia and Red China, were countries that were systematically controlled by a supreme leader who used the five features of the totalitarian model:

- an official dominant ideology that includes a cult of personality about the leader;
- control of all civil and military weapons;
- control of the public and the private mass communications media;
- the use of state terrorism to police the populace;
- a political party of mass membership that perpetually re-elects the leader.

In the 1960s, revisionist Kremlinologists researched communist organizations, as well as the relatively autonomous bureaucracies that influenced high-level policy of Soviet governance. Revisionist Kremlinologists, such as J. Arch Getty and Lynne Viola, transcended the interpretational limitations of the totalitarian model by recognising and reporting that the Soviet government, its party leadership, and the civil society of the USSR had greatly changed upon the death of Stalin. Revisionist social history indicated that the social forces of Soviet society had compelled the government of the USSR to adjust public policy to an actual political economy composed of pre-War and post-War generations with differing perceptions of the utility of communist economics. Hence, Russia had evolved beyond the totalitarian model of the post-Stalinist, 1950s-era, police-state USSR.

=== Post-Cold War ===
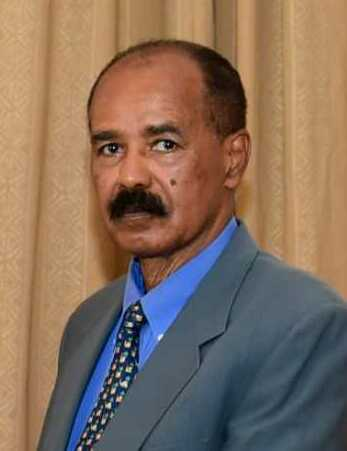
President Isaias Afwerki has ruled Eritrea as a totalitarian dictator since the country's independence in 1993.

Flag of the Islamic State, which is a self-proclaimed caliphate that demands the religious, political, and military obedience of Muslims worldwide

In Did Somebody Say Totalitarianism?: Five Interventions in the (Mis)Use of a Notion, Slavoj Žižek ironically described the concept of totalitarianism as an "ideological antioxidant" similar to the "Celestial Seasonings" green tea that, according to its advertisement, "neutralizes harmful molecules in the body known as free radicals". He further wrote that "[t]he notion of 'totalitarianism', far from being an effective theoretical concept, is a kind of stopgap: instead of enabling us to think, forcing us to acquire a new insight into the historical reality it describes, it relieves us of the duty to think, or even actively prevents us from thinking".

Saladdin Ahmed criticizes the concept of totalitarianism as formulated by Brzezinski and Friedrich and, to a lesser extent, Arendt, in Totalitarian Space and the Destruction of Aura (2019), noting that their definitions of totalitarianism are invalid if transported to other regimes. "This was the case in General August Pinochet's Chile", he writes, "yet it would be absurd to exempt it from the class of totalitarian regimes for that reason alone", since while Pinochet did not adopt an "official" ideology, but "ideological hegemony, whereby the dominant ideology becomes internalized and normalized, is far more effective than imposing an official ideology." Saladdin posited that while Chile under Pinochet had no "official" ideology, there was one man who ruled Chile from "behind the scenes", "none other than Milton Friedman, the godfather of neoliberalism and the most influential teacher of the Chicago Boys, was Pinochet's adviser". To Saladdin, such hegemonic yet not "official" ideology is much a more effective means of "totalitarian" control of society than an "official" ideology openly imposed by the state, what is exemplified by comparing Chile to Nicolae Ceaușescu's Romania, which collapsed within a short period: "No one defended them; no masses poured onto the streets to mourn their deaths. Ceausescu's Romania, as an exemplary Stalinist state, met all of Friedrich and Brzezinski's criteria of a totalitarian state, but it was nowhere close to achieving total domination." In this sense, Saladdin criticized the concept of totalitarianism because it was only being applied to "opposing ideologies" and it was not being applied to liberalism. He also criticized the other criterion of totalitarianism formulated by Brzezinski, Friedrich and Arendt:

"In sum, a regime that does not meet all of Friedrich and Brzezinski's criteria would not necessarily be nontotalitarian or even less totalitarian, if we agree that totalitarianism ultimately amounts to total domination. If anything, realizing a greater degree of domination would necessarily require going beyond each of Friedrich and Brzezinski's criteria. Even without empirical cases which can always be dismissed to spare the proposed criteria – we could, with little difficulty, imagine a system that demonstrates none of the six criteria but is nonetheless more efficient as a totalitarian system. This will become clearer over the course of the rest of this chapter, but it should already be evident that the pioneers of the Cold War definition of totalitarianism molded their conception on the least developed of totalitarian systems... Tailored to Stalinism, [totalitarianism] aimed to predetermine that the negation of liberal capitalism would logically and empirically lead to a horrific system of total and arbitrary terror"; "Philosophically, their account of totalitarianism is invalid because it stipulates "criteria" that amount to an abstracted description of Stalin's USSR, rendering the notion predeterministic."

In the early 2010s, Richard Shorten, Vladimir Tismăneanu, and Aviezer Tucker posited that totalitarian ideologies can take different forms across political systems, yet all focus on utopianism, scientism, or political violence. They posit that Nazism and Stalinism both emphasized the role of specialization in modern societies, saw polymathy as a thing of the past, and stated that their claims were supported by statistics and science, which led them to impose strict ethical regulations on culture, use psychological violence, and persecute entire groups. Other scholars have criticized their arguments due to their partiality and anachronism. Juan Francisco Fuentes treats totalitarianism as an "invented tradition" and he believes that the notion of "modern despotism" is a "reverse anachronism"; for Fuentes, "the anachronistic use of totalitarian/totalitarianism involves the will to reshape the past in the image and likeness of the present".

Other studies try to link modern technological changes to totalitarianism. According to Shoshana Zuboff, the economic pressures of modern surveillance capitalism are driving the intensification of online connection and monitoring, with spaces of social life becoming saturated by corporate actors, directed toward the making of profit and/or the regulation of action. Toby Ord believed that George Orwell's fears of totalitarianism constituted a notable early precursor to modern notions of anthropogenic existential risk, the concept that a future catastrophe could permanently destroy the potential of Earth-originating intelligent life due in part to technological changes, creating a permanent technological dystopia. Ord said that Orwell's writings show that his concern was genuine rather than just a throwaway part of the fictional plot of Nineteen Eighty-Four. In 1949, Orwell wrote that "[a] ruling class which could guard against (four previously enumerated sources of risk) would remain in power permanently". That same year, Bertrand Russell wrote that "modern techniques have made possible a new intensity of governmental control, and this possibility has been exploited very fully in totalitarian states".

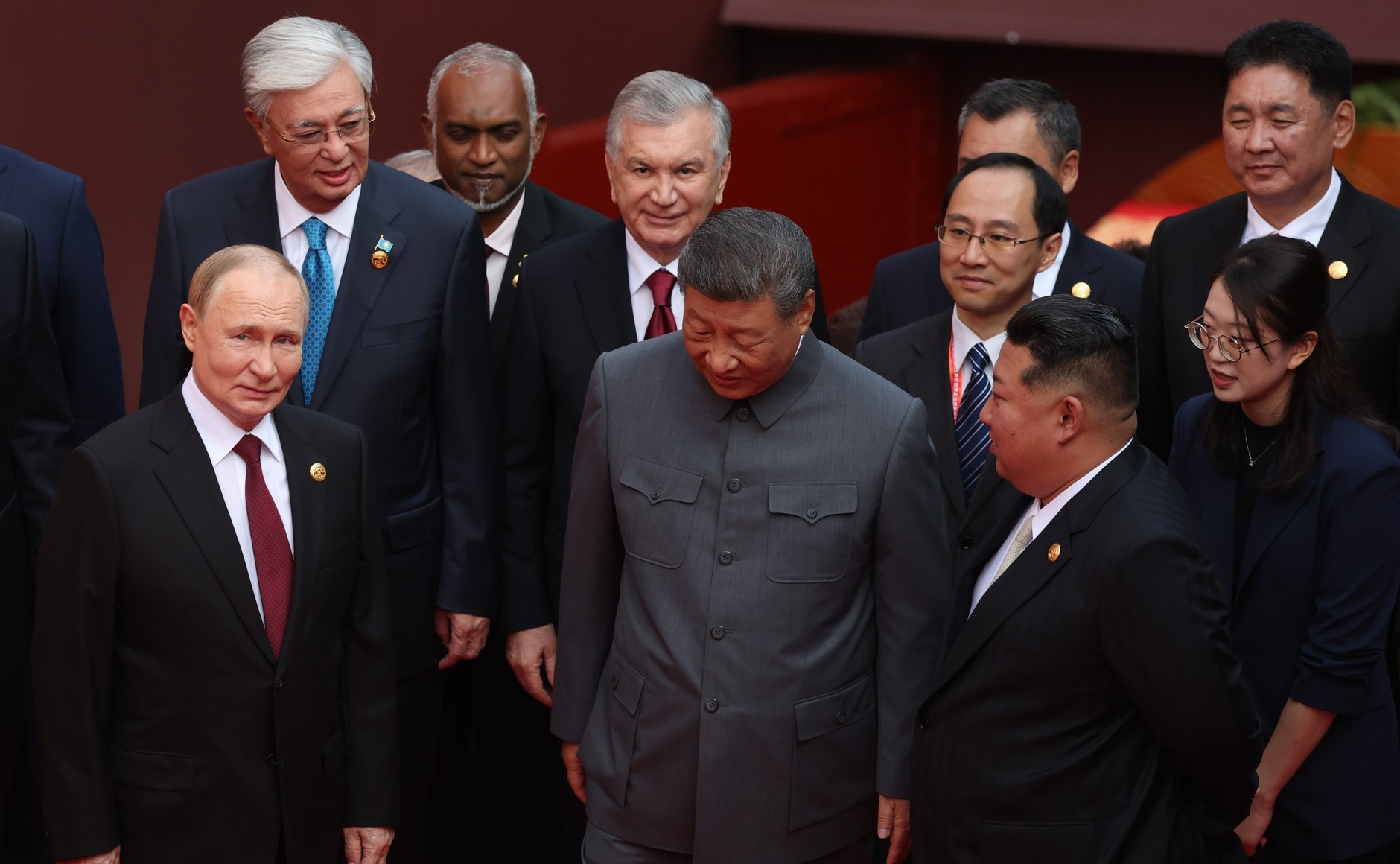
Russian President Vladimir Putin, Chinese President Xi Jinping, and North Korean leader Kim Jong Un in Beijing, September 2025

In 2016, The Economist described China's Social Credit System, developed under General Secretary of the Chinese Communist Party Xi Jinping's administration to screen and rank Chinese citizens based on their personal behavior, as totalitarian. Opponents of China's ranking system say that it is intrusive and it is just another tool which a one-party state can use to control the population. Supporters say that it will transform China into a more civilized and law-abiding society. Shoshana Zuboff considers it instrumentarian rather than totalitarian.

In Revolution and Dictatorship: The Violent Origins of Durable Authoritarianism (2022), the political scientists Steven Levitsky and Lucan Way argued that nascent revolutionary régimes usually became totalitarian régimes unless they were destroyed by a military invasion. Such a revolutionary régime begins as a social revolution independent of the state's existing social structures (not political succession, election to office, or a military coup d'état). For example, the Soviet Union and Maoist China were founded after the years-long Russian Civil War (1917–1922) and Chinese Civil War (1927–1936 and 1945–1949), respectively, not merely state succession. They produce totalitarian dictatorships with three functional characteristics: (i) a cohesive ruling class comprising the military and the political élites, (ii) a strong and loyal coercive apparatus of police and military forces to suppress dissent, and (iii) the destruction of rival political parties, organizations, and independent centers of socio-political power. Moreover, the unitary functioning of the characteristics of totalitarianism allow a totalitarian government to perdure against economic crises (internal and external), large-scale failures of policy, mass social-discontent, and political pressure from other countries. Some totalitarian one-party states were established through coups orchestrated by military officers loyal to a vanguard party that advanced socialist revolution, such as the Socialist Republic of the Union of Burma (1962), the Syrian Arab Republic (1963), and the Democratic Republic of Afghanistan (1978).

=== Possible future emergence ===
Other emerging technologies that could empower future totalitarian regimes include brain-reading and various applications of artificial intelligence. Philosopher Nick Bostrom said that there is a possible trade-off, namely that some existential risks might be mitigated by the establishment of a powerful and permanent world government, and in turn the establishment of such a government could enhance the existential risks which are associated with the rule of a permanent dictatorship.

=== Religious totalitarianism ===
==== Islamic ====
Flag of the Taliban

The Taliban is a totalitarian Sunni Islamist militant group and political movement in Afghanistan that emerged in the aftermath of the Soviet–Afghan War and the end of the Cold War. It governed most of Afghanistan from 1996 to 2001 and returned to power in 2021, controlling the entire country. Features of its totalitarian governance include the imposition of the Pashtunwali culture of the majority-Pashtun ethnic group as religious law, the exclusion of minorities and non-Taliban members from the government, and extensive violations of women's rights.

The Islamic State is a Salafi-Jihadist militant group that was established in 2006 by Abu Omar al-Baghdadi during the Iraqi insurgency, under the name "Islamic State of Iraq". Under the leadership of Abu Bakr al-Baghdadi, the organization later changed its name to the "Islamic State of Iraq and the Levant" in 2013. The group espouses a totalitarian ideology that is a fundamentalist hybrid of Global Jihadism, Wahhabism, and Qutbism. Following its territorial expansion in 2014, the group renamed itself as the "Islamic State" and declared itself a caliphate (Note: Caliphate claim of "Islamic State" group is disputed and declared as illegal by traditional Islamic scholarship.) that sought domination over the Muslim world, establishing what has been described as a "political-religious totalitarian regime". The quasi-state held significant territory in Iraq and Syria during the course of the Third Iraq War and the Syrian civil war from 2013 to 2019 under the dictatorship of its first caliph, Abu Bakr al-Baghdadi, who imposed a strict interpretation of Sharia law.

===== Criticism of the classification of Islamism as totalitarianism =====
Enzo Traverso, a critic of totalitarianism as a theoretical concept of historical and political sciences, is also critical of the usage of it in relation to Islamist movements like the Islamic State and the Taliban and their state formations. According to Traverso, such a notion contradicts the very theoretical concept of totalitarianism. Systems which are commonly described as totalitarian, fascism and communism, sought to create a utopian "New Man" and as a result, they set their projects toward the future, not to revive old forms of absolutism, as noted by Tzvetan Todorov: "The reactionary modernism of Islamic terrorism, on the contrary, employs modern technologies in order to return to the original purity of a mythical Islam. If it has utopian tendencies, they look to the past rather than the future." More to it, totalitarianism has been applied to secular movements which have been described as irrational "political religions" which seek to abolish traditional religions, liturgies and symbols and replace them with their own liturgies and symbols, while Islamic fundamentalism, on the contrary, is a politicized religion and a reaction to secularization and modernization. Besides that, as a form of violence, terrorism is usually described as antipodal to state violence; while fascism was a reaction to democracy, Islamism arose in authoritarian, but weak states. "Speaking of a 'theocratic' totalitarianism makes this concept even more flexible and ambiguous than ever, once again confirming its essential function: not critically interpreting history and the world, but rather fighting an enemy," argues Traverso. Traverso writes that the term was adopted by Western propaganda after 9/11, which had previously used it against other enemies while maintaining the West's geopolitical interests. He notes that the Islamic state which most resembles the concept of totalitarianism, Saudi Arabia, is an ally of the West and as a result, it cannot be considered a part of the "Axis of Evil", and for that reason, as he believes, Saudi Arabia is rarely described as "totalitarian", unlike Iran.

==== Christian ====
Francoist Spain (1936–1975), under the dictator Francisco Franco, had been commonly characterized as totalitarian until 1964, when Juan Linz challenged this characterization and instead described Francoism as "authoritarian" because of its "limited degree of political pluralism" caused by the struggle between "Francoist families" (e.g., Falangists, Carlists, etc.) within the sole legal party FET y de las JONS and the Movimiento Nacional and by other such features as, according to Linz, lack of 'totalitarian' ideology, as Franco relied on National Catholicism and traditionalism. Such revision caused a major debate; some critics of Linz felt that his concept may be a form of acquittal of Francoism and did not concern its early phase (often called "First Francoism"). Later debates focused on whether the regime could be described as 'fascist' rather than 'totalitarian'; some historians stressed the traits of a military dictatorship, while others emphasized the Fascist component, calling the regime a para-fascist or 'fascistized' dictatorship. While Enrique Moradiellos notes that "it is now increasingly rare to define Francoism as a truly fascist and totalitarian regime", he writes that the debates on Francoism have not finished yet. Ismael Saz notes that "it has also begun to be recognized that" Francoism underwent a "totalitarian or quasi-totalitarian, fascist or quasi-fascist" phase. The historians who continue to criticize Linz and describe the regime as totalitarian usually limit such characterization to ten to twenty years of the "First Francoism."

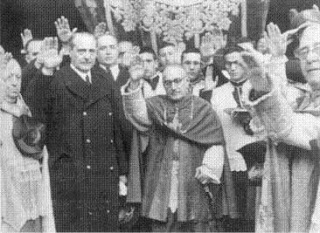
Francoist minister Esteban Bilbao (left) and Catholic archbishop Enrique Pla y Deniel (center) doing the Roman salute in Toledo Cathedral, Spain, March 1942

Linz wrote that "the heteronomous control of the ideological content of Catholic thought by a universal church and specifically by the Pope is one of the most serious obstacles to the creation of a truly totalitarian system..." Linz's argument has been debated: "The frequent and saturated references to Francoist Catholic humanism... coming from Christian theology, could hardly conceal the fact that the individual was only understood as a citizen to the extent of his adherence to the Catholic, hierarchical and economically privatist community that the military uprising had saved," argues Guillermo Portilla Contreras. Furthermore, Luis Aurelio Gonzalez Prieto argues that "Catholic values that permeated the conservative ideological substratum... were precisely what was wielded by the Francoist Spanish political doctrine of the late thirties and early forties to justify the need for the constitution of a totalitarian State at the service and expansion of the Catholic religion."

Franco was portrayed as a fervent Catholic and a staunch defender of Catholicism, the declared state religion. Civil marriages that had taken place in the Republic were declared null and void unless they had been validated by the Catholic Church, along with divorces. Divorce, contraception and abortions were forbidden. According to historian Stanley G. Payne, an opponent of describing Francoism as a totalitarian system, Franco had more day-to-day power than Adolf Hitler or Joseph Stalin possessed at the respective heights of their power. Payne noted that Hitler and Stalin at least maintained rubber-stamp parliaments, while Franco dispensed with even that formality in the early years of his rule. According to Payne, the lack of even a rubber-stamp parliament made Franco's government "the most purely arbitrary in the world." However, from 1959 to 1974, the "Spanish Miracle" took place under the leadership of technocrats, many of whom were members of Opus Dei and a new generation of politicians that replaced the old Falangist guard. Reforms were implemented in the 1950s and Spain abandoned autarky, reassigning economic authority from the isolationist Falangist movement. This led to massive economic growth that lasted until the mid-1970s, known as the "Spanish miracle". This is comparable to de-Stalinization in the Soviet Union in the 1950s, whereby Francoist Spain changed from being openly totalitarian to being an authoritarian dictatorship with a certain degree of economic freedom.

== See also ==
- Inverted totalitarianism
- Totalitarian democracy
- Totalitarian architecture
- Police state
- The Black Book of Communism
- Double genocide theory
- Surveillance capitalism
- List of cults of personality
- List of totalitarian regimes
- Religious supremacism
- Total institution
