= Democracy and Totalitarianism =

1968 book by Raymond Aron

- Title page for Democracy and Totalitarianism (1969)
- Author: Raymond Aron
- Language: English
- Genre: Non-fiction
- Publisher: Weidenfeld and Nicolson
- Publication date: 1968
- ISBN: 978-0-297-76311-6

Democracy and Totalitarianism is a 1968 book by French philosopher and political scientist Raymond Aron. It compares the political systems of the socialist Soviet Union and the liberal countries of the West.

== Soviet history ==
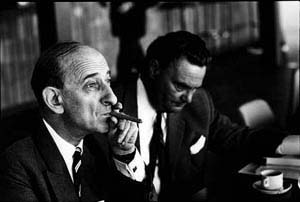
Raymond Aron (1966) by Erling Mandelmann

The basis of the book was a series of lectures Aron gave in 1957 and 1958 at Sorbonne University. It is republished in France regularly and has been translated into many languages, including Russian (1993).

=== Party history ===
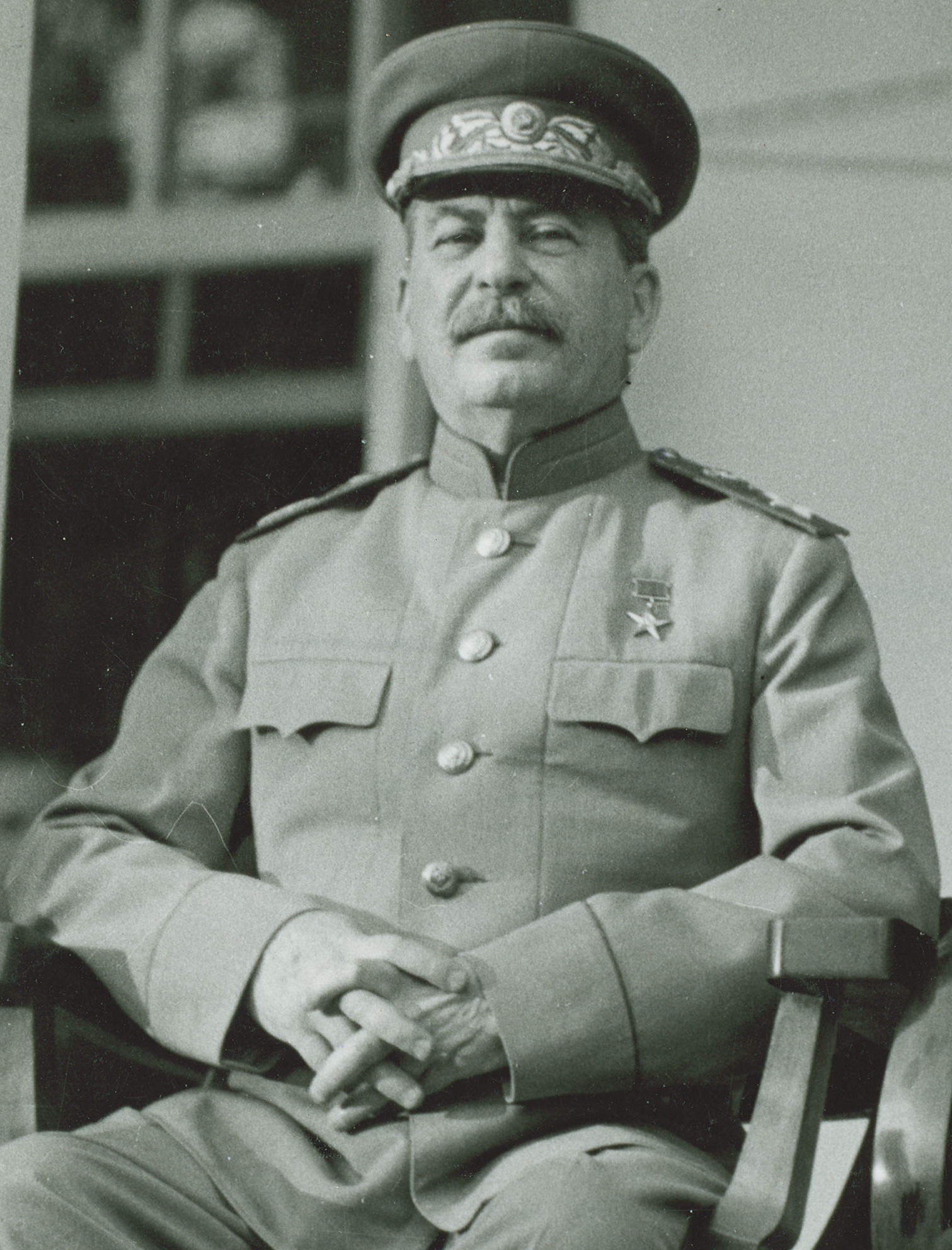
Stalin at the Tehran Conference in 1943

Aron divided the history of the Soviet Communist Party into five stages:

- Before November 1917: Vladimir Lenin wanted to create a party of professional revolutionaries, with strict discipline. According to Lenin, such a party could organize the successful capture of power and could incite the people to revolt, instead of conducting insignificant talks about socialism in parliament. Elections of deputies on congresses of the Soviet Communist Party were held honestly at first, but Lenin later manipulated them and could usually impose his will.
- 1917–1923: discussions took place between party factions. Lenin appeared in the minority quite often, but colleagues trusted him blindly. The secretariat of the party's Central Committee gained power. The party officialdom began to gain power.
- 1923–1930: Joseph Stalin won a victory over other colleagues of Lenin, by gaining the support of the party officialdom. Aron explains Stalin's victory over Leon Trotsky in this way, lamenting that Trotsky was much more talented than Stalin. Aron writes: "Trotsky could speak on anything, but the majority of delegates of congresses voted for the point of view of Stalin because the delegates received posts through the secretariat of the Central Committee of the Soviet Communist Party and delegates of congresses were personally obliged to these by Stalin". Stalin allied with Grigory Zinovyev and Lev Kamenev against Trotsky in the beginning and then with Nicolai Bukharin against Zinovyev and Kamenev. These victories by Stalin played out at party congresses where Stalin consistently won voting majorities.
- 1930–1953: Stalin took near-absolute power. While he continued to confer with others, he generally imposed his will on decisions. Stalin inspired fear in these colleagues since 1934. Party factions were liquidated ruthlessly; all opponents to Stalin were executed.
- After 1953: rivalry between Stalin's successors – Nikita Khrushchev, Lavrentiy Beria and Georgy Malenkov who, according to Lenin's recommendation, tried not to cross the "bloody line" and avoid self-destruction. The exception was made for Beria only – he was executed because colleagues considered him as the supplicant to the tyrant.

== Soviet constitution—fiction and reality ==
The democratically elected constituent assembly was dissolved by the Bolsheviks after its first meeting because a considerable majority of its members were hostile to the Bolsheviks. Merchants, priests and landowners were deprived of electoral rights under the constitution of Russian Soviet Federative Socialist Republic of 1918. According to Aron, this Soviet Constitution had no value because the real power belonged to the Communist Party.

Aron claimed that no distinctions were made between cities and villages under the Constitution of 1936. This was unnecessary because there were ample opportunities to juggle the results of elections. According to official figures 99.9% of voters voted for the Communists. The Communists considered a refusal to vote to be a protest against the government.

Meetings of the Supreme Soviet of Russia turned into performances for the expression of approval for actions of the government.

Citizens had defined civil rights under the Soviet Constitution of 1936, but these rights could be ignored "according to interests of workers". This clause permitted arbitrary action by the authorities. The Constitution of the Soviet Union was a show for the benefit of the West, according to Aron.

Aron notes that the Bolsheviks justified themselves with the idea of a temporary dictatorship. It is possible to say of the affairs of Bolsheviks: "People make the history, but people don't understand history which they make". It couldn't have been otherwise as free discussions were forbidden in the Soviet period, censorship was established and the authorities ruthlessly destroyed all critics of the Party's plans. Aron concluded that the plans and the results of the Communists' activities did not match.

== Ideology and terror ==
According to Bolshevist theory, the October Revolution became a symbol of a victory of the world proletariat. According to Aron, the October Revolution was actually an example of the important role of small political groups in human history. Aron points to imaginary elections and hypocritical welcome exclamations at congresses and demonstrations as symbols of the power of the Soviet ruling clique.

Aron notes that Lenin did not rely on "an objective course of history" to guide his actions and often violated both Marx's theory and his own former statements. Noting the role of state terror in the USSR, Aron noted that both Oliver Cromwell and Maximilien de Robespierre used terror. As an example of state terror Aron that more than half of the delegates to the XVII congress of Soviet Communist Party (1934) were declared "enemies of the people" in years of "big terror". Almost all party veterans were discharged during the mass "cleanings" of 1936–1938. The majority of these veterans were executed or sent to the Gulag. They admitted their own "guilt" during the "Moscow trials", often after torture.

Aron quoted Montesquieu's words about despotism: " The fear seizes all people in society imperceptibly, except one tyrant". In this regard Aron quotes Khrushchev writing that at a meeting with Stalin, Khrushchev knew never whether Stalin wanted to consult him or arrest him. Aron concluded that the fear was part of the Communist experiment.

Aron identified three types of terror in the USSR:

- Punishment for "counterrevolutionary activity" or for "social and dangerous acts". Sentencing did not require the presence of the defendant and appeal was not possible.
- The accused had no right to appeal. Execution followed within a day sentencing.
- Some "convicts" were deported, e.g. from the Caucasus, the Volga region, Crimea, Ukraine, Belarus, or the Baltics to Ural (region), Siberia and Central Asia.

== Totalitarianism ==
Aron named five main signs of totalitarianism:

- One-party has a monopoly on political activity only.
- A state ideology upheld by the ruling party that is given status as the only authority.
- State information monopoly that controls mass media for distribution of official truth.
- State controlled economy with major economic entities under the control of the state.
- Ideological terror that turns economic or professional actions into crimes. Violators are exposed to prosecution and to ideological persecution. Aron drew parallels between Soviet communism, Nazism and Italian fascism. Aron considers all three political regimes to be totalitarian.

== Dictatorship of the proletariat ==
Aron claimed that according to Marx, power belongs to the proletariat under socialism. The proletariat were a minority of the population in Russia before the 1917 October Revolution. Aron concluded that "the power belongs to the proletariat" was thus demagogy, because it excluded the majority. In practice, according to Aron, the power belonged to the ruling group of Party apparatchiks in the USSR. Social democrats (so-called "Mensheviks") warned in 1917 that the socialist revolution would doom workers to despotism for half a century. The leader of the Second International Karl Kautsky stated, after the October Revolution: "The October Revolution is not dictatorship of the proletariat and the October Revolution is the dictatorship of Communist party over the proletariat". Trotsky justified power capture in 1917, but criticized Soviet bureaucracy. However, as Aron specifies, the bureaucracy is necessary for management of a planned economy: the number of officials surpassed the number of industrial workers more than twice by August 1920: 4 million officials against 1.7 million industrial workers.

== Comparisons with the Soviet Union ==
=== Nazi Germany ===
Aron argues that German Nazism and Soviet communism are two versions of totalitarianism. According to Aron one similarity of Nazism and the Soviet system is the use of terror. The purposes and justification of terror varied.

Aron enumerated and compared other similarities of Nazism and the Soviet system:

- one-party system
- official ideology
- ubiquitous police
- tyranny

=== Russian Empire ===
- Existence of bureaucratic hierarchy.
- State ideology (Orthodoxy or communism).
- The guarded relationship to the West that was shown in disputes between Westerners and Slavophiles in the Russian Empire.
- Soviet regime as an Asiatic mode of production

Aron refers to Karl August Wittfogel's work Oriental Despotism: A Comparative Study of Total Power. Marx enumerated various modes of production in A Contribution to the Critique of Political Economy. Marx named an Asian mode of production (Russian) unlike ancient, feudal and capitalist mode of production.

"In broad outline, the Asiatic, ancient, feudal and modern bourgeois modes of production may be designated as epochs marking progress in the economic development of society."

— Karl Marx

A Contribution to the Critique of Political

Economy, p. 8.

Features of an Asian way of production:

- The bureaucracy manages work collectively.
- Agriculture requires irrigation systems that the bureaucracy can organize construction and repair of irrigation systems. The bureaucracy organized industrialization in the USSR.
- Cancellation of market competition and private property.
- Absence of social classes.
- Absolute power of the ruler. Chinese wanted the English ambassador to bow before the Chinese emperor, but the English ambassador refused.

Marxism is the theory of East despotism. The Russian Empire was half Asian until 1917. The Asian mode of production was established in Ancient Egypt and Ancient China. Aron concluded that the Asian way of production was constructed in the USSR.

== Sources ==
- Aron, Raymond; Ionescu, Valence (1968), Democracy and totalitarianism, Weidenfeld and Nicolson, ISBN 978-0-297-76311-6
- Karl August Wittfogel (1981), Oriental despotism a comparative study of total power (1st Vintage Books ed.), New York Vintage Books, ISBN 978-0-394-74701-9
- Karl Marx (1970), A contribution to the critique of political economy, New York International Publishers, ISBN 978-0-7178-0042-1
