= The Opium of the Intellectuals =

1955 book by Raymond Aron

- Author: Raymond Aron
- Translator: Terence Kilmartin
- Language: French
- Publisher: Calmann-Lévy
- Publication date: 1955
- Pages: 334
- ISBN: 9110195645

The Opium of the Intellectuals (French: L'Opium des intellectuels) is a book written by Raymond Aron and published in 1955. It was first published in an English translation in 1957.

== Content ==
Aron's focus is upon his criticism of the widespread intellectual adherence in his time to Marxism. The title of the book is an inversion of Karl Marx's famous dictum that religion is the opium of the people, and is a derivation from Simone Weil's quotation that "Marxism is undoubtedly a religion, in the lowest sense of the word. ... [I]t has been continually used ... as an opiate for the people."

Aron was critical of Marxism in that he saw it as reneging on some of the basic advances made by human civilisations, such as the freedom of enquiry, freedom of controversy, freedom of criticism, and the vote.

In particular, Aron considered that there was a form of intellectual dishonesty or hypocrisy at work in his time period, where some people were extremely critical of certain forms of government or society (such as capitalist democracy) but forgiving towards crimes and infractions committed in societies claiming to manifest the 'correct' ideology. He was, therefore, deeply critical of what he perceived as a form of intellectual dogmatism and fanaticism that held to a fixed framework of thought regardless of empirical evidence in opposition to it - a process akin to the creation of a kind of secular religion or faith system.

A major focus of the criticism in the book is the work of a thinker such as Jean-Paul Sartre, as well as the general tendency to fuse Marxist patterns of thought with Nietzschean and existentialist thinking that relegated prudence from politics.

Aron's focus was chiefly upon the nature of contemporaneous French intellectual thought to the general exclusion of consideration of other cultures such as the Anglo-American.

Aron's broad celebration of what he perceived of as the virtues of liberal democracy also went hand-in-hand with an opposition to the kind of endemic anti-Americanism that was a hallmark of post-war French Leftist ideology, a fact which helped Aron to make many significant contacts within the United States.

== See also ==
- List of political systems in France
