= Rationalist humanism =

Rationalist humanism, or rational humanism or rationalistic humanism, is one of the strands of Age of Enlightenment. It had its roots in Renaissance humanism, as a response to Middle Age religious integralism and obscurantism. Rationalist humanism tradition includes Tocqueville and Montesquieu, and in the 19th century, Élie Halévy.

Other strands of the Enlightenment included scientific naturalism. In the mid 20th century, rational humanism represented also an alternative for those that did not embrace Sartre's existentialism. In the late 20th century, it has sided against the equiparation of human rights with rights to other animal species.

== See also ==
- Rationalism
- Secular humanism
- Raymond Aron
