= Raymond Aron =

French philosopher, sociologist, journalist and political scientist (1905–1983)

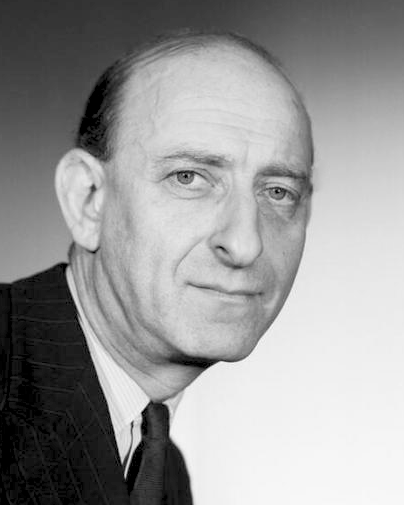
- 1956 portrait
- Born: Raymond Claude Ferdinand Aron; 14 March 1905; Paris, France
- Died: 17 October 1983 (aged 78); Paris, France
- Resting place: Montparnasse Cemetery, Paris

Academic background
- Education: École Normale Supérieure; University of Paris (Dr ès l, 1938)
- Thesis: Essai sur la théorie de l'histoire dans l'Allemagne contemporaine : la philosophie critique de l'histoire (1938)

Academic work
- Era: 20th-century philosophy
- Region: Western philosophy
- School or tradition: Continental philosophy French liberalism
- Institutions: ENA; Sciences Po; University of Paris; Collège de France; EHESS
- Doctoral students: Neagu Djuvara; Jon Elster; Nicolas Herpin; Claude Lefort; Alain Touraine
- Notable students: Pierre Bourdieu; Fernando Henrique Cardoso

Personal details
- Party: SFIO (1920s); RPF (1947–1953)
- Main interests: Political philosophy
- Notable ideas: Marxism as the opium of intellectuals

Raymond Claude Ferdinand Aron (/ɑːˈrɒn/; French: [ʁɛmɔ̃ aʁɔ̃]; 14 March 1905 – 17 October 1983) was a French philosopher, sociologist, political scientist, historian and journalist, one of France's most prominent thinkers of the 20th century.

Aron is best known for his 1955 book The Opium of the Intellectuals, the title of which inverts Karl Marx's claim that religion was the opium of the people; he argues that Marxism was the opium of the intellectuals in post-war France. In the book, Aron chastised French intellectuals for what he described as their harsh criticism of capitalism and democracy and their simultaneous defense of the actions of the communist governments of the East. Critic Roger Kimball suggests that Opium is "a seminal book of the twentieth century". Aron is also known for his lifelong friendship, sometimes fractious, with philosopher Jean-Paul Sartre. The saying "Better be wrong with Sartre than right with Aron" became popular among French intellectuals.

Considered by many as a voice of moderation in politics, Aron had many disciples on both the political left and right; he remarked that he personally was "more of a left-wing Aronian than a right-wing one". Aron wrote extensively on a wide range of other topics. Citing the breadth and quality of Aron's writings, historian James R. Garland suggests, "Though he may be little known in America, Raymond Aron arguably stood as the preeminent example of French intellectualism for much of the twentieth century."

== Life and career ==
Raymond Claude Ferdinand Aron was born on 14 March 1905 in Paris, the son of Gustave Aron, a secular Jewish lawyer. Aron studied at the École Normale Supérieure, where he met Jean-Paul Sartre, who became his friend and later his lifelong intellectual opponent. He was a rational humanist, and a leader among those who did not embrace existentialism. Aron took first place in the agrégation of philosophy in 1928, the year Sartre failed the same exam. In 1938, he received a doctorate in the philosophy of history from the University of Paris.

He had been teaching social philosophy at the University of Toulouse for only a few weeks when World War II began; he joined the Armée de l'Air. When France was defeated, he left for London to join the Free French forces, editing the newspaper, France Libre (Free France).

When the war ended, Aron returned to Paris to teach sociology at the École Nationale d'Administration and Sciences Po. From 1955 to 1968, he taught at the University of Paris, and after 1970 at the Collège de France and the École des hautes études en sciences sociales (EHESS). In 1953, he befriended the young American philosopher Allan Bloom, who was teaching at the Sorbonne.

A lifelong journalist, Aron in 1947 became an influential columnist for Le Figaro, a position he held for thirty years until he joined L'Express, where he wrote a political column up to his death.

He was elected a Foreign Honorary Member of the American Academy of Arts and Sciences in 1960 and an International member of the American Philosophical Society in 1966.

In 1978 he founded Commentaire, a quarterly journal of ideas and debate, together with Jean-Claude Casanova who was the venture's founding director.

Aron died of a heart attack in Paris on 17 October 1983.

== Political commitment ==
Aron's Jewish identity was shaped by his confrontation with Nazi antisemitism. He openly identified as Jewish, but was careful to analyze Nazism dispassionately so that he would not be perceived as motivated by personal bias. In Berlin, Aron witnessed the rise to power of the Nazi Party and developed an aversion to all totalitarian systems. In 1938, he participated in the Colloque Walter Lippmann in Paris. By the 1950s, he had grown very critical of the Austrian School and described their obsession with private property as an "inverted Marxism". Aron always promoted an "immoderately moderate" form of liberalism which accepted a mixed economy as the normal economic model of the age.

== Political thought ==
Aron is the author of books on Karl Marx and on Carl von Clausewitz. In Peace and War, he set out a theory of international relations. He argues that Max Weber's claim that the state has a monopoly on the legitimate use of physical force does not apply to the relationship between states.

In the field of international relations in the 1950s, Aron hypothesized that despite the advent of nuclear weapons, nations would still require conventional military forces. The usefulness of such forces would be made necessary by what he called a "nuclear taboo."

== Honours ==
- Officier of the Legion of Honour (France)
- Croix de Guerre 1939–1945 (France)
- Commander of the Ordre des Palmes académiques (France)
- Medal Pour le Mérite (Germany)

== Works ==
A prolific author, he "wrote several thousand editorials and several hundred academic articles, essays, and comments, as well as about forty books", which include:

- Aron, Raymond (1935). La Sociologie allemande contemporaine. Paris: Alcan. ; Translated to English as German Sociology. London: Heinemann. 1957.
- Aron, Raymond (1938). Introduction à la philosophie de l'histoire. Essai sur les limites de l'objectivité historique. Paris: Gallimard.; Aron, Raymond (1948). Introduction to the Philosophy of History: An Essay on the Limits of Historical Objectivity. London: Weidenfeld & Nicolson.
- Essai sur la théorie de l'histoire dans l'Allemagne contemporaine. La philosophie critique de l'histoire. Paris: Vrin. 1938.
- L'Homme contre les tyrans. New York: Editions de la Maison française. 1944.
- De l'armistice à l'insurrection nationale. Paris: Gallimard. 1945.
- L'Âge des empires et l'Avenir de la France. Paris: Défense de la France. 1945.
- Le Grand Schisme. Paris: Gallimard. 1948.
- Les Guerres en Chaîne. Paris: Gallimard. 1951.; The Century of Total War. London: Derek Verschayle. 1954.
- La Coexistence pacifique. Essai d'analyse. Paris: Editions Monde nouveau. 1953. (under the pseudonym François Houtisse, with Boris Souvarine)
- L'Opium des intellectuels. Paris: Calmann-Lévy. 1955.; The Opium of the Intellectuals, London: Secker & Warburg, 1957
- Polémiques. Paris: Gallimard. 1955.
- La Tragédie algérienne. Paris: Plon. 1957.
- Espoir et peur du siècle. Essais non partisans. Paris: Calmann-Lévy. 1957. (partially translated in On War: atomic weapons & global diplomacy. London: Secker & Warburg. 1958.)
- L'Algérie et la République. Paris: Plon. 1958.
- La Société industrielle et la Guerre, suivi d'un Tableau de la diplomatie mondiale en 1958. Paris: Plon. 1959.
- Immuable et changeante. De la IVe à la Ve République. Paris: Calmann-Lévy. 1959.; France, Steadfast and Changing: The Fourth to the Fifth Republic. Cambridge (Mass.): Harvard University Press. 1960.
- Introduction. Classes et conflits de classes dans la société industrielle (Ralph Dahrendorf). Paris: Mouton Éditeur. 1959.
- Dimensions de la conscience historique. Paris: Plon. 1961.
- Paix et guerre entre les nations. Paris: Calmann-Lévy. 1962.; Peace and War. London: Weidenfeld & Nicolson. 1966.
- Le Grand Débat. Initiation à la stratégie atomique. Paris: Calmann-Lévy. 1963.; The Great Debate, New York, Doubleday & Company, Inc., 1965
- Dix-huit leçons sur la société industrielle, Paris: Gallimard, 1963; Eighteen Lectures on Industrial Society, London: Weidenfeld & Nicolson, 1967
- La Lutte des classes, Paris: Gallimard, 1964
- Essai sur les libertés, Paris: Calmann-Lévy, 1965
- Démocratie et totalitarisme, Paris: Gallimard, 1965; Democracy and totalitarianism, Weidenfeld and Nicolson, 1968
- Trois essais sur l'âge industriel, Paris: Plon, 1966; The Industrial Society. Three Essays on Ideology and Development, London: Weidenfeld & Nicolson, 1967
- Les Étapes de la pensée sociologique, Paris: Gallimard, 1967; Main Currents in Sociological Thought, London: Weidenfeld & Nicolson, 1965
- De Gaulle, Israël et les Juifs, Paris: Plon, 1968; De Gaulle, Israel and the Jews, Praeger, 1969
- La Révolution introuvable. Réflexions sur les événements de mai, Paris: Fayard, 1968
- Les Désillusions du progrès, Paris: Calmann-Lévy, 1969; Progress and Disillusion: The Dialectics of Modern Society, Pall Mall Press, 1968
- D'une sainte famille à l'autre. Essai sur le marxisme imaginaire, Paris: Gallimard, 1969
- De la condition historique du sociologue, Paris: Gallimard, 1971
- Études politiques, Paris: Gallimard, 1972
- République impériale. Les États-unis dans le monde (1945–1972), Paris: Calmann-Lévy, 1973; The Imperial Republic: The United States and the World 1945–1973, Little Brown & Company 1974
- Histoire et dialectique de la violence, Paris: Gallimard, 1973; History and the Dialectic of Violence: Analysis of Sartre's Critique de la raison dialectique, Oxford: Blackwell, 1979
- Penser la guerre, Clausewitz, Paris: Gallimard, 1976; Clausewitz: Philosopher of War, London: Routledge, 1983
- Plaidoyer pour l'Europe décadente, Paris: Laffont, 1977; In Defense of Decadent Europe, South Bend IN: Regnery, 1977
- with Andre Glucksman and Benny Levy. "Sartre's Errors: A Discussion". Telos 44 (Summer 1980). New York: Telos Press
- Le Spectateur engagé, Paris: Julliard, 1981 (interviews)
- Mémoires, Paris: Julliard, 1983
- Les dernières années du siècle, Paris: Julliard, 1984
- Ueber Deutschland und den Nationalsozialismus. Fruehe politische Schriften 1930–1939, Joachim Stark, ed. and pref., Opladen: Leske & Budrich, 1993
- Le Marxisme de Marx, Paris: Éditions de Fallois, 2002
- De Giscard à Mitterrand: 1977–1983 (editorials from L'Express), with preface by Jean-Claude Casanova, Paris: Éditions de Fallois, 2005
- Aron, Raymond (1938). Essai sur la théorie de l'histoire dans l'Allemagne contemporaine (Doctoral thesis).

=== Other media ===
- Raymond Aron, spectateur engagé. Entretiens avec Raymond Aron. (Duration: 160 mins.), DVD, Éditions Montparnasse, 2005

== See also ==
- Centre de recherches politiques Raymond Aron

== Sources ==
- Anderson, Brian C., Raymond Aron: The Recovery of the Political, Rowman & Littlefield, 1998
- Colquhoun, Robert. Raymond Aron. Volume I: The Philosopher in History 1905–1955. Volume II: The Sociologist in Society 1955–1983. London: Sage, 1986.
- Craiutu, Aurelian, "Raymond Aron and the tradition of political moderation in France", French Liberalism from Montesquieu to the Present Day, Cambridge University Press, 2012.
- Davis, Reed M. A Politics of Understanding: The International Thought of Raymond Aron. Baton Rouge LA.:Louisiana State University Press, 2009 ISBN 978-0807135174
- Forneris, Elias, "Raymond Aron's War: A 'History of the Present' (1940–1944)", The Tocqueville Review/La revue Tocqueville 43, no.2 (2022): 7-38. doi:10.3138/ttr.43.2.7
- Forneris, Elias, "Raymond Aron's Sociology of Collaborators (1940–1944)", International Journal of Politics, Culture and Society (2024): 1-23.
- Gagliano, Giuseppe La nuova sinistra Americana e il movimento del maggio francese nelle interpretazioni di Raymon Aron e Herbert Marcuse. Uniservice, 2011 ISBN 978-8861786608
- Launay, Stephen, La Pensée politique de Raymond Aron, Paris: Presses Universitaires de France, 1995
- Mahoney, Daniel and Bryan-Paul Frost (eds.), Political Reason in the Age of Ideology: Essays in Honor of Raymond Aron, New Brunswick/London: Transaction Publishers, 2006
- Molina, Jerónimo, Raymond Aron, realista político. Del maquiavelismo a la crítica de las religiones seculares, Madrid: Sequitur, 2013
- Stark, Joachim, Das unvollendete Abenteuer. Geschichte, Gesellschaft und Politik im Werk Raymond Arons, Wuerzburg: Koenigshausen und Neumann, 1986
- Stark, Joachim, Raymond Aron (1905–1983), in Dirk Kaesler, Klassiker der Soziologie, Vol. II: Von Talcott Parsons bis Anthony Giddens, Munich: Beck, 5th ed., 2007, 105–129
- Bavaj, Riccardo, Ideologierausch und Realitaetsblindheit. Raymond Arons Kritik am Intellektuellen franzoesischen Typs, Zeithistorische Forschungen/Studies in Contemporary History 5 (2008), No. 2, 332–338,
- Oppermann, Matthias, Raymond Aron und Deutschland. Die Verteidigung der Freiheit und das Problem des Totalitarismus, Ostfildern: Thorbecke Verlag 2008.
- Oppermann, Matthias (Ed.), Im Kampf gegen die modernen Tyranneien. Ein Raymond-Aron-Brevier, Zurich: NZZ Libro 2011.
- Stark, Joachim, "Das unvollendete Abenteuer. Geschichte, Gesellschaft und Politik im Werk Raymond Arons", Wuerzburg: Koenigshausen und Neumann, 1986
- Stark, Joachim, "Raymond Aron (1905–1983)", in Dirk Kaesler, Klassiker der Soziologie, Vol. II: Von Talcott Parsons bis Anthony Giddens, Munich: Beck, 5th ed., 2007, 105–129
- Stewart, Iain, Raymond Aron and Liberal Thought in the Twentieth Century (Cambridge University Press, 2019)
