= Commentaire =

French quarterly magazine

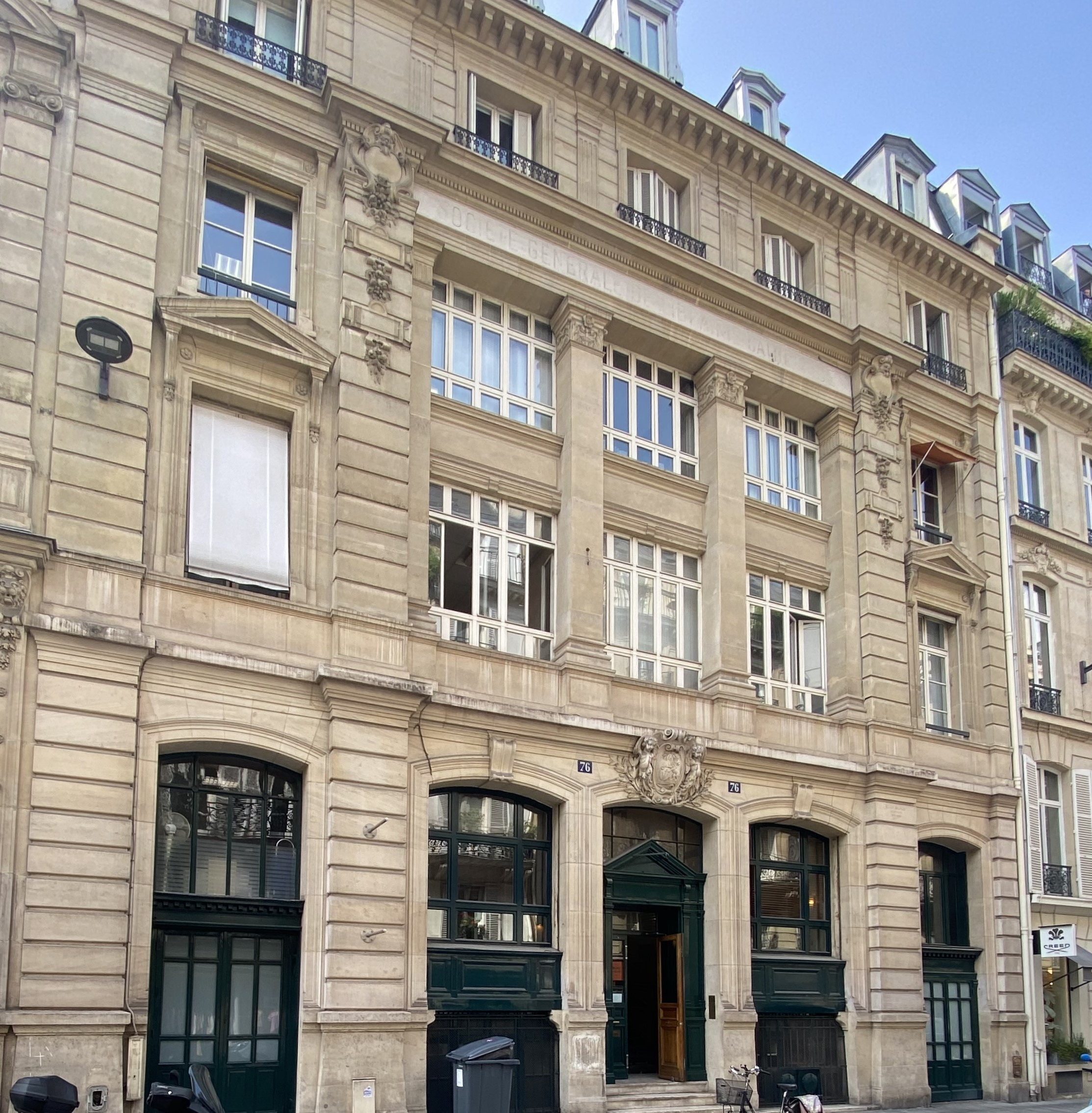
- Building at 76, rue des Saints-Pères in Paris, office of Commentaire since 2021
- Frequency: Quarterly
- Total circulation (2008): 6000
- First issue: 1978; 47 years ago
- Country: France
- Language: French
- Website: www.commentaire.fr
- ISSN: 0180-8214 (print); 2272-8988 (web)

Commentaire is a French quarterly magazine, created in 1978 by Raymond Aron and Jean-Claude Casanova.

Aron's previous journal venture, started in 1970 and titled Contrepoint, had been terminated in 1976 following disagreements among its founders and its owner Patrick Devedjian. In a wide-ranging 2008 interview, Casanova described the decision to create Commentaire as having been made in late 1977 and involving, besides Aron and himself, a group of common friends that included Annie Kriegel, Jean Baechler, Alain Besançon, François Bourricaud, and Kostas Papaïoannou. The journal's motto, a quote from Pericles, was suggested by Papaioannou: Il n’y a pas de bonheur sans liberté, ni de liberté sans vaillance ("there can be neither happiness without liberty, nor liberty without courage"). Pierre Manent was the author of a manifesto explaining the journal's purpose in the first issue.

Among the journal's avowedly liberal inspirations, Casanova cited Montesquieu, Benjamin Constant, Alexis de Tocqueville, Élie Halévy, and Aron himself.

The journal relies largely on volunteer work and a small administrative staff. In 2008, it printed 6,000 copies and had 3,800 subscribers, the rest being sold in bookstores and news shops.

A specific feature is the abundance of selected quotes in each of the journal's issues. A section titled sans commentaire ("no comment") includes involuntary comical quotes, often from political leaders or ideological commentators.

In 2017, Commentaire made all its past published articles available online. Like its center-left peer Esprit, it is self-published and not dependent on a large publishing house.

== Affiliates ==
As of early 2021, Commentaire's website mentioned two circles of affiliates (including past and deceased ones):

- Editorial Board (Conseil de rédaction): Gilles Andréani, Nicolas Baverez, Guy Berger, Alain Besançon, Jean-Louis Bourlanges, Nathalie Delapalme, Gilles Étrillard, Marc Fumaroli, Pierre Manent, George de Ménil, Philippe Meyer, François Sureau, Philippe Trainar, Michel Zink
- Editorial Committee (Comité de rédaction): Cédric Argenton, Jean Baechler, Guillaume Barrera, Karol Beffa, Jacques Bille, Dominique Bocquet, Michel Bourdeau, Fabrice Bouthillon, Christopher Caldwell, Gwendal Châton, Laurent Cohen-Tanugi, Benedetta Craveri, Jean-Marc Daniel, Gil Delannoi, Jacques Dewitte, Michel Duclos, Bruno Durieux, Vincent Feré, Louis de Fouchécour, Alexandre Gady, Jean Gatty, François Gorand, Donatien Grau, Sylviane Guillaumont, Patrick Guillaumont, Michel Gurfinkiel, Ran Halévi, Pierre Hassner, Jean-Vincent Holeindre, Henri Hude, Roland Hureaux, Pierre Kende, Annie Kriegel, Arthur Kriegel, Armand Laferrère, Guillaume Lagane, Mathieu Laine, Vincent Laloy, Alain Lancelot, Alain Laurent, Tristan Lecoq, Franck Lessay, Didier Maillard, Béatrice Majnoni d'Intignano, Sophie-Caroline de Margerie, Hervé Mariton, François de Mazières, Paul Mentré, Christophe Mercier, Thierry de Montbrial, Jean-Thomas Nordmann, Kostas Papaïoannou, Benoît Pellistrandi, Rémy Prud'Homme, Philippe Raynaud, Pierre Rigoulot, Hervé Robert, Giuseppe Sacco, Christian Saint-Étienne, Maryvonne de Saint-Pulgent, Guillaume Sainteny, Dominique Schnapper, Antoine Schnapper, Mark Sherringham, Christine Sourgins, Christian Stoffaës, Laurent Theis, Éric Thiers, Françoise Thom, Nicolas Véron, Jean-Philippe Vincent, Emmanuel de Waresquiel

== See also ==
- Le Débat
- Esprit
- Études
- Revue des deux Mondes
