= Camille Froidevaux-Metterie =

French philosopher and political scientist

Camille Froidevaux-Metterrie
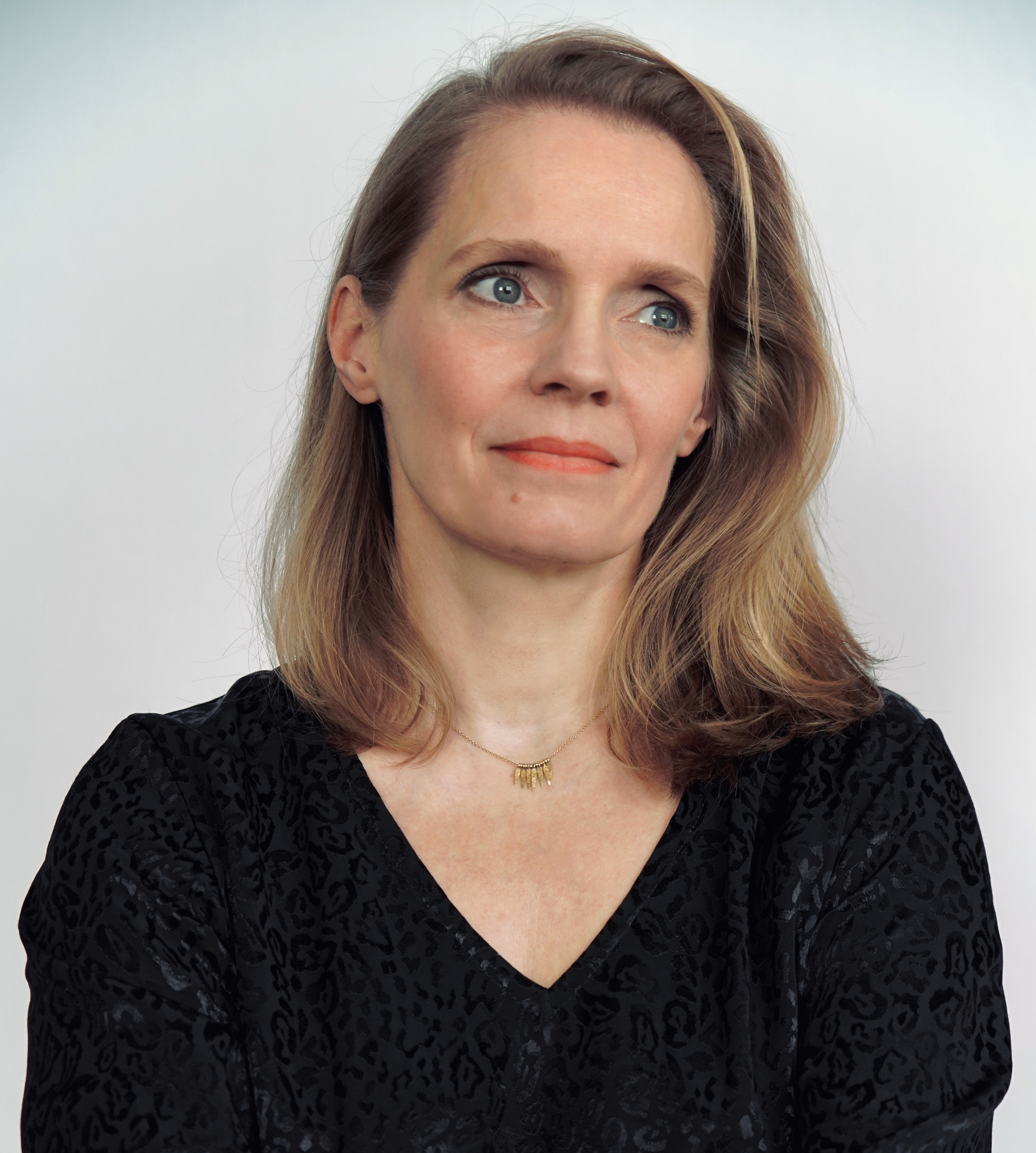
- Born: 1968 (age 57–58); Paris, France
- Occupations: Philosopher; researcher; professor
- Awards: Chevalier de l'ordre national du Mérite

Academic background
- Education: School for Advanced Studies in the Social Sciences
- Thesis: Religion, politique et histoire : christianisme et modernité selon Ernst Troeltsch (1997)
- Doctoral advisor: Marcel Gauchet

Academic work
- Discipline: Women's studies
- Sub-discipline: Female condition in the contemporary era
- Institutions: University of Reims Champagne-Ardenne; Paris-Panthéon-Assas University

Camille Froidevaux-Metterie (born November 18, 1968) is a researcher and professor of political science. Her work focuses on the transformations of the female condition in the contemporary era, in a phenomenological perspective that places the question of the body at the center of the reflection. Her work also focuses on women's reappropriation of their bodies as expressed in recent feminist movements dealing with issues related to intimacy and female genitality (notably the Harvey Weinstein affair and the MeToo movement). In 2017, she was awarded the Chevalier de l'ordre national du Mérite. Her work has been developed in continuity of the feminist philosophy of Simone de Beauvoir and Iris Marion Young.

== Biography ==
Camille Froidevaux-Metterrie was born in Paris, 1968. Her 1997 dissertation at the School for Advanced Studies in the Social Sciences under the direction of Marcel Gauchet was entitled, Religion, politique et histoire : christianisme et modernité selon Ernst Troeltsch.

She initially directed her research towards the relationship between politics and religion in the Western world, from her thesis on the German sociologist, Ernst Troeltsch to her work on the theological-political question^{[more precision needed]} in the United States. She was a lecturer in political science at the Paris-Panthéon-Assas University from 2002 to 2011. From 2010 to 2015, she was a member of the Institut Universitaire de France. Since 2011, she has been a professor at the University of Reims Champagne-Ardenne, where she is also in charge of the Equality and Diversity program.

In 2010, she made a thematic turn to focus on contemporary changes affecting the status of women. She has been studying the consequences of feminist studies on the division of the private-female and public-masculine spheres, highlighting a phenomenon of "desexualization of the world". On this basis, she has been investigating the meaning of women's bodies from a phenomenological perspective.

From a sociological point of view, her research has led to a large-scale survey of French women politicians, which has resulted in a docu-drama entitled Dans la jungle. From a philosophical approach, her research has led to a series of articles ^{[about what?]} and a book entitled La révolution du féminin, published in 2015 by Éditions Gallimard.

From 2012 to 2018, she popularized her work through the blog "Féminin singulier" of the French Philosophie Magazine. Her expertise in gender inequality and feminist movements is regularly solicited by French public media.

In September 2021, she published Un corps à soi, a work where she joined philosophical theory, testimonies and personal experiences on the physical dimensions of feminism.

== Awards and honours ==
- Knight, Ordre national du Mérite (May 2, 2017)

== Selected works ==
- Ernst Troeltsch, la religion chrétienne et le monde moderne (in French). PUF. 1999. ISBN 2130499570. (from her thesis defended in 1997)
- Politique et religion aux États-Unis. Repères (in French). Paris: La Découverte. 2009. doi:10.3917/dec.froid.2009.01. ISBN 978-2-7071-5397-5. OCLC 312402977.
- Froidevaux-Metterie, Camille; Chevrier, Marc, eds. (2014). Des femmes et des hommes singuliers - perspectives croisées sur le devenir sexué des individus en démocratie (in French). Paris: Armand Colin. ISBN 978-2-200-28923-2.
- La révolution du féminin (in French). Paris: Gallimard. 2015. ISBN 978-2-07-014752-6.
- Le corps des femmes (in French). Philosophie magazine éditeur. 2018. ISBN 978-2-900818-01-5.
- Seins - en quête d'une libération (in French). Anamosa. 2020. ISBN 979-1095772873.
- Un corps à soi (in French). Paris: Seuil. 2021. ISBN 9782021448665.

=== Novels ===
- Pleine et douce. Paris: Sabine Wespieser. 5 January 2023. ISBN 978-2848054674.
