= Manuel Cornejo =

French musicologist (born 1971)

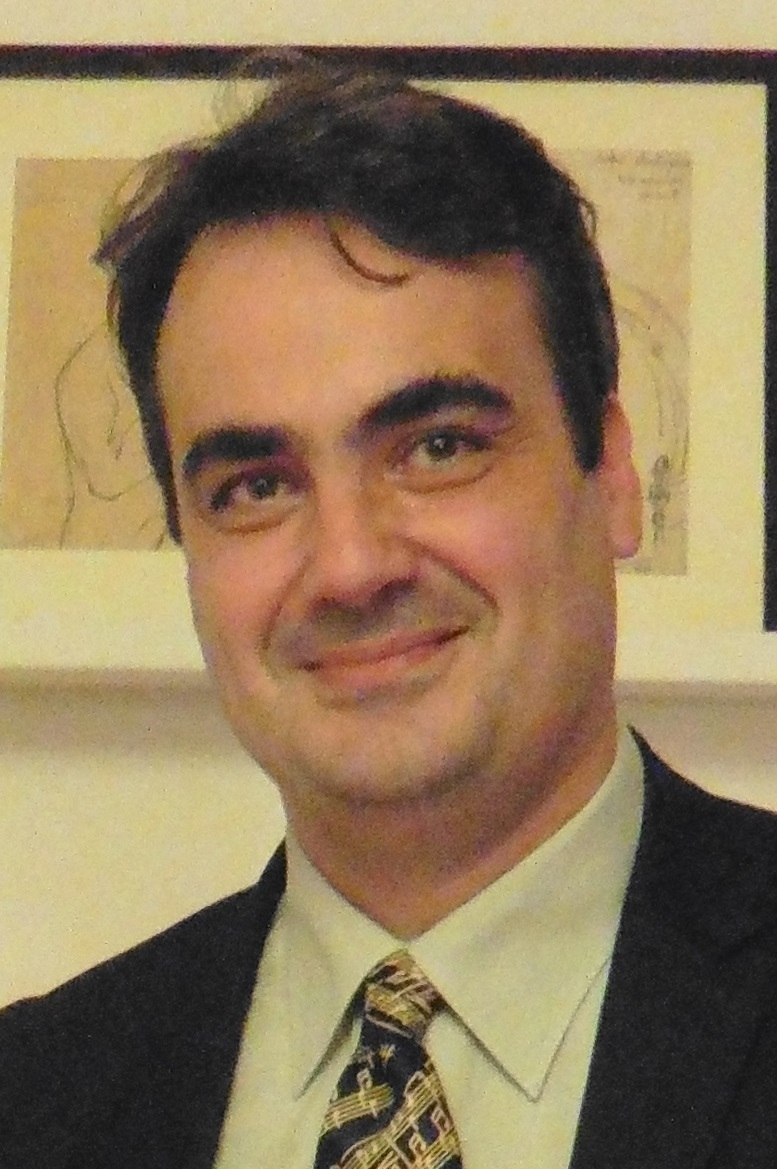
- Manuel Cornejo in 2015
- Born: 4 October 1971; Senlis, France
- Occupation: hispanist, musicologist

Manuel Cornejo (born 4 October 1971) is a French hispanist, specialist of Lope de Vega and musicologist, specialist of Maurice Ravel.

== Biography ==
Born on 4 October 1971 in Senlis, is a French hispanist and musicologist. From 2003 to 2005 he was member of the scientific section of the Casa de Velázquez and in 2004 he obtained his doctorate in Spanish literature on Lope de Vega under the supervision of Jean Canavaggio. He is also a musicologist, specialist of Maurice Ravel, whose correspondence he published in 2018 and 2025. Since 2020, he has been a contributor to the Dezède music database, of which he joined the scientific committee in 2023. Since 2023, he has been an associate member of the IReMus, the French Institute for Research in Musicology. Since 2012, he has also been the founder and president of the French association Les Amis de Maurice Ravel (Maurice Ravel Friends Society).

== Publications ==
- Ravel, Maurice (2025). Correspondance, écrits et entretiens, édition établie, présentée et annotée par Manuel Cornejo (in French). Paris: Gallimard. ISBN 9782073111111.
- Ravel, Maurice (2018). L'intégrale. Correspondance (1895-1937), écrits et entretiens, édition établie, présentée et annotée par Manuel Cornejo (in French). Paris: Le Passeur Éditeur. ISBN 9782368905777.

== Awards ==
- 2026 : Prix René Dumesnil-Académie des beaux-arts.
