= Marcel Gauchet =

French historian, philosopher, and sociologist

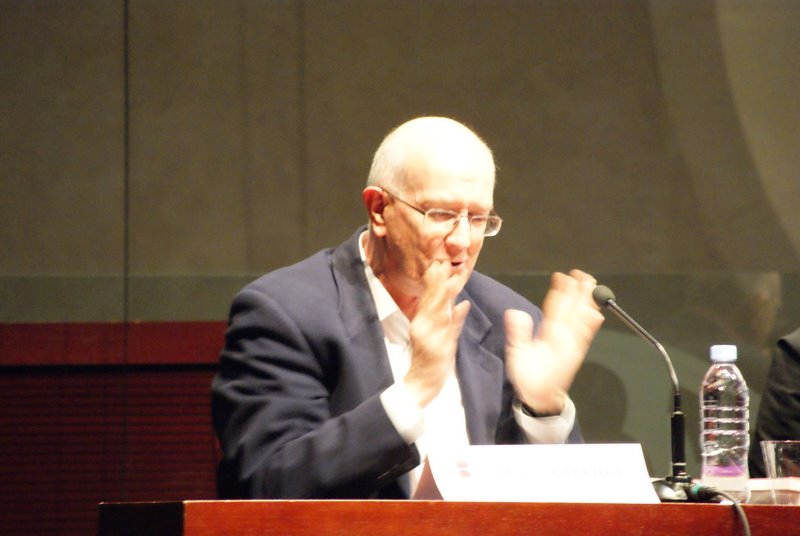
- Born: 1946 (age 79–80); Poilley, Manche, France

Philosophical work
- Era: Contemporary philosophy
- Region: Western philosophy
- School: Continental philosophy Anti-totalitarian left / French liberalism (1970s); Classical republicanism (1980s)
- Main interests: Political philosophy

Marcel Gauchet (French: [ɡoʃɛ]; born 1946) is a French historian, philosopher, and sociologist. He is professor emeritus of the Centre de recherches politiques Raymond Aron at the École des Hautes Études en Sciences Sociales and former head of the periodical Le Débat. Gauchet is one of France's most prominent contemporary intellectuals. He has written widely on such issues as the political consequences of modern individualism, the relation between religion and democracy, and the dilemmas of globalisation.

Two of Gauchet's books have been translated into English, including The Disenchantment of the World: A Political History of Religion. Gauchet was awarded the Prix européen de l'essai, fondation Charles Veillon in 2018.

== Biography ==
=== Early life ===
As the son of a Gaullist railway worker and a Catholic seamstress, Gauchet received both a Catholic education and a republican one in the French public schooling system. In 1961, he attended the teacher training college of Saint-Lô, after which he pursued additional teaching qualifications for secondary schooling. In 1962, he met Didier Anger, who was an active member of a union movement created by educators. Through him, Gauchet met anti-Stalinist left militants, quite different from the communists who dominated the colleges that were training primary school teachers. Gauchet then came into contact with Socialisme ou Barbarie, a radical socialist journal also of an anti-Stalinian ideological orientation. In his first protest, he demonstrated against violent police repression during the Algerian war, in reaction to the so-called Charonne metro station scandal.

He then joined the Lycée Henri-IV to prepare for the competitive entry exam into the École normale supérieure de Fontenay-Saint-Cloud. However, he decided to end his education before sitting the exam, and returned to the Manche department to take up teaching once again.

=== Academic career ===
Gauchet later resumed his higher education studies. From 1966 to 1971, under the guidance of Claude Lefort, his professor at the University of Caen Normandy, Gauchet wrote his DESA thesis on Freud and Lacan. Lefort steered Gauchet towards political philosophy, which led him to study simultaneously for three majors in philosophy, history and sociology. During these years of study, Gauchet attempted to distance himself from the Marxist strain of theory which nonetheless continued to exercise influence over Lefort.

In Caen, Gauchet studied alongside Jean-Pierre Le Goff and Alain Caillé. With Le Goff, he took part in situationist anarchist rallies; and during the events of May 68, he remained faithful to the revolutionary spontaneity of the student revolts. After May 68, he broke with Marxism altogether.

Marcel Gauchet then began his journey through the world of intellectual journals. From 1970 to 1975, with its original instigator Marc Richir, he revived Textures, the journal created by students at the Université libre de Bruxelles, which was supported by a newly created editorial committee, composed of Gauchet himself, Richir, Lefort, Cornelius Castoriadis, and Pierre Clastres. In 1971, Gauchet published his first articles in a special issue of the journal L’Arc (‘Lieu de la pensée’, L’Arc, no 46, p. 19-30) dedicated to Maurice Merleau-Ponty, and in Textures (‘Sur la démocratie : le politique et l’institution du social’, named after a course delivered by Lefort). Together with Lefort, Castoriadis and Clastres, and in association with Miguel Abensour and Maurice Lucciani, Gauchet then launched the journal Libre in March 1977. This journal, which picked up from where Textures left off, was subtitled - ‘Politics, Anthropology, Philosophy’. Eight issues were published through Payot et Rivage until 1980.

Gauchet's other collaborative works included those written with his partner Gladys Swain, who introduced him to the field of psychiatry and anti-psychiatry. During his collaboration with Swain, he completed critical reviews of La Société contre l’État, recherches d’anthropologie politique by Clastres (with Gauchet's review appearing in October 1974 in Les Éditions de Minuit) and of L’Histoire de la folie à l’âge classique by Michel Foucault. In April 1980, Gauchet published his first book, co-written with Gladys Swain, La Pratique de l'esprit humain(see synopsis below).

Lefort introduced Gauchet to François Furet, a historian who conducted a seminar in the Paris School for Advanced Studies in the Social Sciences (also known as EHESS). This seminar later gave birth to the Centre de recherches politiques Raymond Aron (also known as CERPRA), a centre for political studies. Furet welcomed Gauchet to the EHESS and introduced him to his brother-in-law, Pierre Nora. Throughn the EHESS, Gauchet met Pierre Manent, Pierre Rosanvallon, Vincent Descombes, and encountered once again, Cornelius Castoriadis.

In May 1980, Nora appointed Gauchet as the chief editor of his recently launched journal Le Débat. This decision taken by Nora was, at the time, perceived as an indication of his desire to distance himself from Foucault, especially given Gauchet's intense criticisms of Foucauldian theories in La pratique de l’esprit humain.

In July 1980, Gauchet published "Les droits de l’homme ne sont pas une politique" in the third issue of Le Débat (July - August). In hindsight, this article appears as a major intellectual turning point marking Gauchet's break from the political philosophy of his former intellectual mentor Lefort, and its emphasis on the symbolic emancipatory power of human rights. It heralded the development of his own analysis of the inner tensions of liberal democracy and their contemporary manifestation. In 1989, in what constitutes a major milestone of his career, Gauchet, sponsored by Nora and Furet, was appointed to the Centre de recherches politiques Raymond Aron (CERPRA), the political studies centre of the EHESS. Here, he met several other significant thinkers like Manent, Rosanvallon, Jacques Juillard, Philippe Raynaud, and Monique Canto-Sperber, all of whom could be said to be intellectual heirs to Raymond Aron's work.

=== Timeline of main academic output ===
In 1985, Gauchet penned the work for which he first became known outside France, Le Désenchantement du monde: Une Histoire politique de la religion with its English translation coming out later as The Disenchantment of the World: A Political History of Religion. This book's narrative follows the history of the creation of Western democracy, and analyses the role that religion played in constructing a collective social identity. Four years later, in La Révolution des droits de l'homme Gauchet turned to the historiography of the French Revolution in order to analyse the debates around the creation of modern democracy that arose from this historically significant event. A few years later, the democratic dimension of the French Revolution resurfaced as the leading theme of La Révolution des pouvoirs - La souveraineté, le peuple et la représentation (1789-1799). This book examines how the binary tension between the people and the officials ultimately played part in the failure of the French Revolution's ideals.

In 2002, Gauchet published La Démocratie contre elle-même, which brought together in one volume all the political articles published by Gauchet in Le Débat since its inception. These essays deal with different topics such as: human rights, religion, school education, contemporary psychology and liberalism. As a whole, they express the central concern that runs throughout all of Gauchet's writings: the need to try and understand the new and disconcerting form that democracy started to exhibit from the turn of the 21st century, democracy being defined by him as ‘a way of being’, rather than simply a form of political regime. La condition historique was later published with Francois Azouvi and Sylvain Piron, a book of interviews discussing topics like post-structuralism, anti-totalitarianism and the effects of May 68. In 2005 came La Condition politique, a book of essays written in the 1970s and 1980s, together with new texts responding to more recent events such as the creation of the European Union. This book presented Gauchet's post-Marxist understanding of the political foundations of all human societies.

In 2014, with Alain Badiou, a key figure in the French radical left and an advocate of Maoist communism, Gauchet co-authored Que faire? Dialogue sur le communisme, le capitalisme et l'avenir de la démocratie. Translated into English in 2015, this book presented a debate between the two thinkers on the topics of capitalism, communism, and contemporary democracy. These discussions brought Gauchet's work to the attention of the public already cognisant of Badiou's works. Further that year, he published Comprendre le malheur français with Éric Conan and François Azouvi. This book of interviews detailed Gauchet's analysis of the increasing anxiety and pessimism of the French population, in regards to France's diminished influence in an enlarged European Union, within the context of globalisation. This book was followed by Comprendre le malheur français II, where Gauchet reconvened with Conan and Azouvi to discuss Emmanuel Macron's term as the president of the French republic. Gauchet analyses how Macron dealt with the crisis caused by the unresolved issues he inherited from his predecessors. It examines how well Macron dealt with them and the extent to which he upheld his promises to the French people - leading Gauchet to the verdict that Macron's presidency was a failure.

The year before, Gauchet had gone back to the French Revolution to discuss the philosophy and historical significance of one of its most influential figures, Maximilien Robespierre, in Robespierre: l'homme qui nous divise le plus. This book looks at how Robespierre embodied the two sides of the French Revolution: the promise of freedom and the danger of tyranny. This makes him a man whose life allows us today to gain a deeper understanding of the Revolution in its essential contradictions. Furthermore, Gauchet published La Droite et la Gauche: histoire et destin which revisits an iconic text first published in Les Lieux de mémoire to ask if the ideological divide is still meaningful in the contemporary era.

== Philosophy ==
Through a genealogy of "modernity", Marcel Gauchet's works propose to redefine "the modern", and to put it at a distance, especially in its Heideggerian and postmodernist reinterpretations — for example, that of Foucault. Gauchet's approach thus constitutes a philosophy, as defined in La Condition historique: a way to engage with contemporary experience. His redefinition of what we call “the modern” attests to the political nature of this philosophy. The Disenchantment of The World, La Révolution des pouvoirs, La Révolution des droits de l’homme, and La Religion dans la démocratie established the genealogy of the democratic breakthrough from a negative angle, that of the ‘exit from religion’; ‘religion’ being the primeval symbolic framework of collective life pertaining to the transcendental, which shapes human societies’ collective identity and their definition of institutional legitimacy.

In the aforementioned works, Gauchet pointed out the paradoxes of modern democratic societies by placing them in a historical perspective. The sequel, L’Avènement de la démocratie, analyses the genealogy of democratic culture from its positive side; that of humanity's evolution, the creation of its self-government across time and space, which operates through the production (praxis) of its own becoming as a species, mastered through the law and politics. This self-government is synonymous with the government of history. With modernity, both humanity's political and historical conditions — which, Gauchet argues, define its existence — thus progressively took over from the primordial religious form of social existence or ‘being-together’.

Gauchet's project in L’Avènement de la démocratie can hence be defined as a theory and re-conceptualization of democracy, from the point of view of historical anthropology. This approach leads him to show how modern democracy constitutes a ‘mixed regime’. It is the political form assumed by the autonomous form of collective existence once it is ‘taken out of religion’. This political form is organised around the mastery of three activities — the law, politics, and history. Democracy thus always encounters the possible failure of this conjoint mastery of the three fundamental dimensions of human-social existence, once it is no longer informed by religion. The tragedies of the 20th century are examined as a response to the first ‘growth crisis’ of the young liberal democracies. Liberalism — understood as the ‘liberal upheaval’, the eruption of historicity and ‘society’ without democracy or political control of historicity — has indeed opened up the return of what Gauchet calls ‘the political’ but still bearing the imprint of religion, which generated the totalitarian ideologies of the early 20th century.

The fourth and last volume of L’Avènement de la démocratie examines the triumphs of liberal democracy born of the defeat of totalitarianism. It shows that the contemporary ‘neoliberal ideological dominance’ is a total phenomenon, with legal, sociological and anthropological dimensions, as well as implications for the communication media. In the ‘society of individuals’ that gave birth to this new ideology, individuals cling to their rights and interests; they are both ultra-connected with and separated from one another, without the benefit of any consistent collective mediation. This loss of common reference points or purpose constitutes the ‘malaise’ examined in the main argument of Gauchet's Le Nouveau monde. The autonomy that has been achieved in our new world is in fact ‘truncated’. Rather than being a ‘solution’, it has become a ‘problem’. It is thus necessary to relaunch it, in both its deepest meaning and its practical manifestations, specifically through the reinvention of the democratic experience. As Gauchet puts it, ‘the history of liberation is behind us; the history of freedom is only just beginning’.

In so far as it exposes the existence of parallel historical stages between the development of new forms of ‘being-together’ and that of the subject, this theory of democracy can be understood at a meta-level. In La Condition politique, Gauchet states that his theory can also be seen as elaborating what he calls a ‘transcendental anthropo-sociology’. That is to say, it reveals the processes that constitute the conditions in which humanity, during its history, acquired a consciousness of itself as a subject. The subject is considered to be both part of the collective being and distinct from it, an idea conveyed through the notion of ‘the political’, which is central to Marcel Gauchet's work. The advent of this consciousness is explained in his books on the history of psychiatry and psychoanalysis: La Pratique de l'esprit humain, L’Inconscient cérébral, Le Vrai Charcot, as well as his works on education.

‘The political’ is what gives human collectivities the power to govern themselves. This power is repressed in heteronomous political forms but manifests itself openly as such through autonomy. ‘The political’ asserts itself explicitly not least through the invention of ‘politics’, after the invention of the State, then that of the modern Nation State and with it, of the individual and of history. In modernity, ‘the political’, the force that binds human societies, ceases to function through vertical symbolic meaning encompassing the entirety of social life (such as monarchical structures of the political). The ‘political’ instead becomes an infrastructure underpinning collective life concretely from below. It becomes "modern" through a process of metamorphosis which was first encouraged by the liberal upheaval and its deconstruction of the previous regime of meaning encapsulated in the French revolutionary notion of Ancien Régime.

Gauchet has also been interested in the question of the crisis of schooling and education, which, in Conditions de l'éducation, he analyses in a similar vein to that of Hannah Arendt. According to him, schooling helps produce rational citizens and individuals, concerned with producing the members who shape the future. Gauchet argues however that the deepening of contemporary individualism encourages us to lose sight of the fact that this production supposes certain pre-conditions. Pedagogy, or pedagogism, is ideological in nature. As such, it reproduces the negation of this necessity. From this point on, Gauchet is interested in themes such as authority and the transmission of knowledge. Learning is not just about assimilating knowledge into one's own psychology, it is also adapting one's mental processes to new methodologies. Here Gauchet is optimistic: democracy will give rise to a political consensus around schooling and its requirements, because schooling is an essential condition for the creation of the type of individuals needed by our societies through education.

== Ideas ==
=== Madness and Democracy: The Modern Psychiatric Universe ===
La Pratique de l’esprit humain: l'institution asilaire et la révolution démocratique, translated into English as Madness and Democracy: The Modern Psychiatric Universe, brings together political analysis and the study of the genesis of psychiatry and the creation of institutions to treat mental illness. Gauchet and Swain argue that asylums were an incarnation of the modern political utopia where sanity was preserved and individuals were supposedly saved from the brink of insanity. This book is of particular importance since Gauchet and Swain critique Foucault's theory on insanity and madness. Foucault postulated that contemporary societies had become increasingly normative, and any stark deviation from the norm would see the “deviant” individual being placed in mental asylums and institutions. Contrastingly, Foucault argued that in an earlier era, the strangely behaving individuals were allowed to function freely within society, despite the possibility of them challenging society's norms by virtue of their presence.

However, this argument by Foucault is challenged by Gauchet and Swain to elucidate that, in earlier eras where these individuals were given their social liberty, it was only in fact due to the perception that these individuals were seen as radically different, whether it be as superior or inferior beings. Hence, they did not per se challenge the norms of society. Rather, they functioned as a foil for its identity. Gauchet and Swain argued that the perception of the “mad” had changed at the end of the 18th century, such that they were seen to be part of society's ideals of humanity. Thus, with this new perception of shared humanity, their difference with the rest of society had begun to appear challenging. As a result, the rational attempts to address these unsettling individuals brought forth a fervour of therapeutics in psychiatry and the creation of asylums. In other words, the asylum functioned to hold the antithetical “insane” individuals who were no longer considered as radically “other” in a type of society that increasingly accepted the idea of ontological equality. Gauchet and Swain used this observation to analyse the democratic culture that birthed the destruction of the monarchy and its hierarchical structure.

=== The Disenchantment of the World: A Political History of Religion ===
Le Désenchantement du Monde: Une Histoire politique de la religion, translated into English as The Disenchantment of the World: A Political History of Religion, is Gauchet's first and most well-known book and the work that first gained him recognition outside of France. Tracing the genesis of democracy back in history, Gauchet examines the role of hierarchy with that of the traditional framework within which human societies always secured their collective identity and cohesion, which he terms “religion”. Gauchet asserts that the most fully formed forms of religion are not the monotheist faiths of Judaism and Christianity, but rather the “primeval” religions that existed many millennia ago. In societies that were arranged around this religious model, all individuals were equal before the laws of the gods, who were themselves seen as one with nature.

In Europe, in order to maintain a collective sense of belonging, European societies ordered themselves around the metaphysical principles of Christianity which, paradoxically, ultimately led them to overthrow the religious conception of social order, a feature of human experience from times immemorial. This leads Gauchet to assert that Christianity as the religion which facilitated an “exit from religion” played a major role in the advent of modernity and of a new understanding of human power. Through Christianity, the transcendental presence of God was no longer dispersed throughout nature, but was now represented as an omnipotent, singular power. Monotheism led to humans questioning the divine law, learning to think more freely and individually, and consequently, to place their rational trust in the State, which opened up the pursuit of collective autonomy, through a new understanding of the State that also transformed the place of the individual.

By abandoning the “religious” model of vertical hierarchy in favour of a model that grants individual autonomy, the collective identity ceased to be seen as imposed upon individuals by the transcendental world above. This is not to say that European societies abandoned religious beliefs altogether; rather, that the very status and role of religion changed, making possible the democratization of culture, first and foremost through an understanding of the representative role of the state with respect to the new notion of society. In contemporary democracies, individuals need to define this collective identity themselves. In other words, those who can now consciously determine their own fate and their sense of belonging no longer live in an “enchanted” world.

Extending from this, the law is no longer dictated from the perception of a transcendental power, but is instead created by individuals in their pursuit of a self-governing society. Gauchet neither criticises nor laments this shift away from transcendental laws — he objectively analyses this change as having allowed the birth of democracy. He specifically considers this change not as a progress per se, but as a movement towards human autonomy. The ending of the book follows on from this analysis to tie the history of democracy to contemporary individualism. Gauchet states that democracy naturally paves the way for conflict between individuals and different groups within society, given that autonomous individuals are now free to define their own destiny and values. Gauchet proposes that this organic juxtaposition of conflicting ideals leads to the recognition that there is no perfect solution to human problems: conflict is present in potentially all societies. Denying this omnipresent conflict characterises heteronomous culture whereas autonomous culture accepts it.

=== La Révolution des droits de l'homme ===
In La Révolution des droits de l'homme, Gauchet used historiography to reflect on the place of political phenomena in socio-historical events. This book extends Gauchet's central reflections on democratic equality, a theme that already pervaded his two major earlier works, The Disenchantment of the World: A Political History of Religion and Madness and Democracy: The Modern Psychiatric Universe, the latter being co-authored with Gladys Swain. Gauchet turned his attention to an emblematic historical event in the genesis of modern democracy, the formulation of the French Declaration of the Rights of Man. In particular, he attempted to explore two enigmas — firstly, the purely French enigma that saw the Declaration being formulated to impose an unassailable principle of political legitimacy which ultimately saw democracy upheld in a country without democrats; secondly, the modern democratic enigma wherein society achieves consciousness of itself through the assertion of its constitution of power.

In 1789, at the outset of the French Revolution, the representatives of the French people who created a new assembly that defined itself as “national”, were confronted with the need to attack the authority of the monarchy, in order to pursue their desire to establish an independent and competing pole of legitimacy on which they would be able to rely in their project to construct a constitutional framework limiting the king's power. When they established this competing legitimacy, the representatives, however, retained the absolutist conception of power that characterised the French monarchy and used it as the basis of the notion of national sovereignty. In the process, they were led to formulate what they saw as the ideal conditions of equality, even before they actually debated the institutions that would uphold these conditions. Furthermore, Gauchet's book elucidates a contradiction central to the specifically French understanding of democracy — the paradoxical coalescence of the French revolutionaries' project to construct a new, cohesive social order, and of their ideal of individual freedom. According to Gauchet, the French Revolution's idealistic bend, which had its roots in this need to challenge the monarch's considerable authority, birthed a tension, even a contradiction, between the “liberal” and the “collectivist” understandings of democracy. This contradiction runs through the history of French political regimes until the two poles were reconciled within the Republican framework.

=== La Révolution des pouvoirs ===
As Gauchet first established in La Révolution des droits de l'homme, the revolutionaries established the idea of political representation as the very crux of democracy. Six years later, in La Révolution des pouvoirs, Gauchet furthered his analysis by moving away from the question of the founding ideals towards the debates of the national assembly that continued to shape this political experience of representation. After the French Revolution, as the people sought to innovate politically in a way that would allow society to govern itself autonomously, the attention of the legislators turned towards the relationship between the legislative and the executive and the question of making the people's constituent power effective though the creation of an arbitrating power between the parliament and government. That is, they began discussing how to shape a third power — the judiciary. This third power was discussed under many names, but it can be seen as a precursor to what we now know as constitutional law.

Another function of this third power was to embody the distance between the people and their elected representatives, thus preserving the ideal of popular sovereignty as distinct from empirical power. Hence, Gauchet stresses that a nation's sovereignty acquires a symbolic effectiveness through the judgement of this third power. Gauchet uses these teachings from the French Revolution to bring the focus back to the contemporary era in which the gap between the ideal sovereignty of the people, and the reality of representation by the elected members, is signalled not only by the role acquired by constitutional courts in the second half of the 20th century, but also by the role of the media and through them, of public opinion. In his later work, Gauchet went on to highlight the danger that the power of this third party potentially poses under the pressure of contemporary individualism: when its task is to regulate the action of government and society, it seeks to foster the rights of individuals, which comes at the risk of diminishing the people's collective capacity to act. This tension, which is at the heart of contemporary liberal democracy, remains the leading theme of Gauchet's work. In parallel, it shows how the law, as an instrument of rationalization of human relations, has acquired more prominence in a new perception of democracy, the democracy of control.

=== Towards an analysis of contemporary democracy ===
La Démocratie contre elle-même brings together in one volume all the political articles published by Gauchet in Le Débat since its inception. These articles deal with different topics: human rights, religion, school education, contemporary psychology and liberalism. As a whole, they express the central concern that runs throughout Gauchet's entire writings: to try and understand the new and disconcerting form that democracy started to exhibit from the turn of the 21st century, democracy being defined as ‘a way of being’, rather than simply a form of political regime. The book argues that the prominence gained by the quest to secure the rights of individuals in practice undermines their actual realization. This paradox summarized in the title as the tendency of democratic culture to work against itself, is characteristic of the new situation in which democracy finds itself: whilst it is no longer contested by Marxist critique and now rests on the support of a wide social consensus, the victory of its principles is generating new problems. The triumph of individual rights, according to Gauchet, threatens to bring about a crisis of liberal democracy.

In La Condition politique, composed of Gauchet's essays from the 1970s and 1980s, together with new texts responding to more recent events such as the creation of the European Union, Gauchet presents his post-Marxist understanding of the political foundations of all human societies. Its publication thus went against the depoliticized interpretations of the globalization process influential at the turn of the century, which emphasized the marginalization of the nation-state and the centrality of economic phenomena. Its overall theme, the ‘eclipse of the political’ in contemporary liberal democracies was then explored extensively in later works, within the general hypothesis that this eclipse explains the destabilization of European societies in the first decade of the 21st century.

=== L'Avènement de la démocratie ===
L'Avènement de la démocratie, Gauchet's magisterial tetralogy, carries on from his work in The Disenchantment of the World. Following the exit from religion, humanity turned to the idea of men establishing ways and processes to govern their own societies and their relationships. The first volume, La Révolution Moderne, acts as a prologue that sets the scene. It outlines the cultural and intellectual revolution that brought the ideal of autonomy to European societies between the 16th and 19th centuries, and ultimately ushered in the creation of democratic government. This volume examines, in particular, the development of new perspectives associated with the ideal of self-governance through a “mixed regime” associating three different perspectives. These underpin contemporary Western liberal democracy, but at the same time, constitute a permanent problem for it. The three dimensions of liberal democracy, constantly in tension with one another, are: le politique (the collective political imperative), le droit (rights-based law) and l’histoire (future-oriented historical action). Through the evolution of modernity, the influence of “religion” has been eroded, which has consequently diminished the political function of metaphysical beliefs. Gauchet hypothesises that within contemporary societies, the three aforementioned perspectives have been developed unevenly, upsetting the balance that was established in the early form of liberal democracy. All four volumes of L’Avènement de la démocratie analyse this loss of balance, and delve into how phenomena like juridification and economism have contributed to this loss.

The second volume, La Crise du libéralisme, analyses the Western political landscape's successes and failures throughout the period 1880 to 1914. The increased pertinence of universal suffrage and the progress in representative politics shed light on the speed of the changes that accompanied the newfound freedom from hierarchy. It explores the return of the political triggered by the crisis of liberalism in the form of colonial imperialism and the significance of the first globalisation it paradoxically inspired, in an analysis that leads him to take distance from the Marxist–Leninist interpretation of the period.

The third volume, À l'épreuve des totalitarismes, examines the deepening hold of liberal democracy but also its paradoxical contribution to the appearance of totalitarianism in the 20th century. Gauchet discusses several key events such as the rise of Nazism, Stalinism and fascism, as well as socialism's lack of imprint in the US at the time, as opposed to Europe. Its analysis of the journey through these events corroborates the rise of what Gauchet calls “ideocracies” and “their secular religions”. These ideologies helped the totalitarian regimes establish their popular legitimacy by grounding themselves in the older religious contexts of spiritual communion, supposedly natural cohesion and hierarchical social order. In this respect, they were responding to the destabilization of European societies induced by the progress of democratic culture, and reasserted the ideal of an absolute collective unity transcending the aspiration to individual freedom.

The fourth and final volume, Le Nouveau monde, also the longest of the tetralogy, scrutinises the reorientation of societies since the 1970s, the rise of neoliberalism and postmodernity, and their effects on the ideals of Western democracy. This volume discusses the capitalistic orientation of the economic identity of 21st century societies, while tackling questions to do with the individualistic and economy-driven craze of neoliberalism. Gauchet uncovers the nature of individualism in a new postmodern and neo-liberal form of democracy, wherein the individualistic identity is at odds with old understandings of collective (including national) identity. Gauchet's analysis of the unprecedented power of “generalised capitalism”, of a new project of artificialisation of human life through the combined effect of neo-liberal economic and legal rationalisation, leads him to plead for a new project of substantive autonomy to transcend the narrow, purely functional autonomy associated with the insatiable quest for absolute innovation. This project of self-reflection requires a deeper understanding of what makes human knowledge possible in order to combat the deintellectualisation encouraged by ultra-modern “structural” autonomy.

=== Comprendre le malheur français ===
Gauchet's book Comprendre le malheur français examines the pessimism that is specific to France, especially in regards to the French population's perception of their country's position in Europe and the rest of the world. In specific, Gauchet analyses the views of certain groups in France on the phenomena of globalisation and the liaison between France and other powerful countries in the European Union. When comparing this pessimistic viewpoint with those of a more positive nature, Gauchet brings to light the increasing discordance between the 'elites' and the rest of the population, a dissociation that widens social divisions in French society. In this book of conversation with Eric Conan and Francois Azouvi, Gauchet also explores the depths of so-called populism, as termed by the 'elites', and considers the implications for politicians in terms of responsible leadership. Ultimately, Gauchet scrutinises the role of neoliberalism as a determinant of France's pursuit of legitimation in the EU, and the pessimism that ensues from the application of this economic and political framework.

=== Comprendre le malheur francais II ===
In Macron, les leçons d'un échec: Comprendre le malheur français II, Gauchet discusses the presidency of Emmanuel Macron, and the phenomena that surround Macron's succession to the post as well as his handling of France's contemporary issues. Gauchet, while acknowledging the challenges of Macron's presidency, analyses his election as the consequence of the collapse of the French political party system. According to Gauchet, Macron was able to benefit from a populist movement against the elites of France, and despite belonging to this elite population himself, he was able to show empathy towards the disadvantaged part of the population.

In doing so, Macron distanced himself from the far left politics of Jean-Luc Mélenchon and the far right leader Marine Le Pen, appearing as an ideal centrist politician capable of transcending the left-right divide blamed for having paralysed the country and made it impossible for it to meet the contemporary challenges of globalisation and European economic integration. By detonating the tensions between the right and the left, Macron opened up a multitude of possibilities for new social and political protests, as seen in the yellow vests movement. Paradoxically, he then revealed himself not to have challenged the dominant elite political consensus of the previous three decades (as first crafted by former presidents François Mitterrand and Jacques Chirac — ‘le mitterrando-chiraquisme’), but to have upheld it. Gauchet suggests that the dynamism unleashed by Macron may yet have more repercussions for French politics as a result, and that the 2022 French presidential election could still hold many surprises.

== Reception ==
In comparison to that of other French philosophers like Michel Foucault or Jacques Derrida, the reception of Gauchet's work in the English-speaking world has been less pervasive. One of the main reasons for this disparity is the style of Gauchet's philosophy, and its departure from classical “French theory”, is its close links to post-structuralism, which has promoted a distinct type of philosophy that many celebrated French intellectuals abided by. Gauchet's views are relatively more centrist and reformist in comparison with those of other French theorists such as Foucault, whose ideas tend to be more binary and extreme. In other words, Gauchet's work seems foreign to an English-speaking reader who awaits from his work another example of traditional French theory. In particular, Gauchet and Swain critiqued certain principles of Foucault's ideology surrounding institutions that treat mental illness. Despite their book having been translated to English, the ideas are however not cited as far and wide as Foucault's are. In a more general sense, there is an observation that Gauchet may not have been forgiven for having criticised Foucault's ideas.

Despite this dissimilarity with classical French theory, Gauchet's work remains within the traditions of a certain strand of continental philosophy, standing in contrast with analytic philosophy, the latter being far more familiar to Anglo-Saxon intellectuals and readers. With its methodology relying heavily on the analysis of the logic of language, analytical philosophy characterises the works of famously studied philosophers such as John Rawls and Richard Rorty whose historical significance Gauchet discusses in "Les tâches de la philosophie politique". Through Gauchet's predilection for abstract reconstructions of history from an anthropological perspective, often perceived as symptomatic of Hegelian influence, there is the possibility that Anglo-Saxon readers find his work difficult to comprehend.

Even within France, the controversy of Blois exemplifies a common misunderstanding of Gauchet's philosophy. Geoffroy de Lagasnerie, a philosopher, and Edouard Louis, a writer, made an appeal to boycott Gauchet's lectures at the 2014 Rendez-vous de l’histoire at Blois, an annual conference that brings together intellectuals to discuss socio-historic topics. Lagasnerie and Louis deemed Gauchet's ideas intolerable because they were, according to them, too conservative. In response, several intellectuals created a collective opinion piece in Le Monde. In this piece, they argued that the act of boycotting the convention went against the very spirit of democracy, a principle that is indeed based on respecting the diversity of opinions. This controversy, as analysed in The New York Times, illustrated the preference of the far left for radical moralistic indictments of ideas rather than their analysis.

Gauchet has, in a number of different contexts, made clear his critique of 21st century radicalism, especially in its neo-Marxist form. As stated in his debate with Badiou his critique is not inspired by a fundamental disagreement over the need to imagine a different kind of society but by an assessment of its political ineffectiveness. For Gauchet, the radicalism of the extreme left amounts to a form of purely idealistic aristocratism which traps intelligence in a political impasse. It encourages a pose of intellectual distinction from the rest of society, which appears to be challenging the established order but in reality, does little to destabilise it, not least because it does not provide in depth analyses of the phenomena it seeks to combat and transcend. This pose of ‘enlightened’ radicalism ‘replaces the content and becomes an end in itself’. It delivers only symbolic benefits for its supporters, freeing them from the arduous political work needed to change the status quo. At the same time, it confers upon them a sense of moral distinction derived from the feeling of not being tainted by any compromise with political reality; Gauchet thus contrasts what he describes as politically expedient radicalism with genuine intellectual radicalism. In keeping with the etymology of the word, intellectual radicalism goes to the root of contemporary problems based on both historical and anthropological knowledge. It informs Gauchet's project for a new critical philosophy.

== Major works ==
=== Selected books ===
- Madness and Democracy: The Modern Psychiatric Universe (with Gladys Swain), 1980, translated into English in 2007
- The Disenchantment of the World: A Political History of Religion, 1985, translated in 1997
- La Révolution des droits de l'homme, 1989
- La Révolution des pouvoirs - La souveraineté, le peuple et la représentation (1789-1799), 1995
- Que faire ? Dialogue sur le communisme, le capitalisme et l’avenir de la démocratie (with Alain Badiou), 2014
- Comprendre le malheur français (in collaboration with Éric Conan and François Azouvi), 2016
- L'Avènement de la démocratie 4 : Le Nouveau Monde, 2017
- Robespierre, l'homme qui nous divise le plus, 2018
- Macron, les leçons d'un échec. Comprendre le malheur français II (in collaboration with Éric Conan and François Azouvi), 2021
- La Droite et la gauche: Histoire et destin, 2021

=== Selected articles ===
- "De l’avènement de l’individu à La Découverte de La Société", 1984
- "Les droits de l'homme ne sont pas une politique", 1980
- "Fin de la religion ?", 1984
- "L'école à l'école d'elle-même: Contraintes et contradictions de l'individualisme démocratique", 1985
- "Les voies secrètes de la société libérale", 2000
- "Le problème européen", 2004
- "L'enfant imaginaire", 2015
- "Democracy: From One Crisis to Another", 2015
- “Populism as Symptom”, 2017

=== Other French originals ===
- La Pratique de l’esprit humain: l’institution asilaire et la révolution démocratique (avec Gladys Swain), 1980
- L’Inconscient cérébral, 1992
- Le Vrai Charcot, 1997
- La religion dans la démocratie: Parcours de la laïcité, 1998
- La Démocratie contre elle-même, 2002
- La Condition historique, 2003
- La Condition politique, 2005
- L'Avènement de la démocratie 1 : La Révolution Moderne, 2007
- L'Avènement de la démocratie 2 : La Crise du libéralisme, 2007
- L'Avènement de la démocratie 3 : À l’épreuve des totalitarismes, 2010
