= Alan Schom =

American historian and biographer

Alan Morris Cedric Strauss-Schom (born 9 May 1937 (Note: Although Schom claims a birth date of 9 May 1937 on his personal website, the 1940 Census (taken 1 April 1940) lists Alan Scham of Sterling, Illinois as already being at least 2 years old) in Sterling, Illinois), known as Alan Schom (Note: In earlier life he was known by the name Alan Morris Scham) and legally Alan Strauss-Schom is an American historian and biographer. Specialising in French History, his work on Napoleon - comparing him to Stalin and Hitler -, is widely dismissed and subject to controversy among academics, although it saw him receive Pulitzer Prize and National Book Award nominations.

== Biography ==
Alan Morris Cedric Strauss-Schom, also known as Alan Schom, was born in Sterling, Illinois, on May 9, 1937. His father Irving died in 1983. His mother was Matilde, née Strauss Stoler. His one sister, Faith Sharon Schom, was a psychologist, who died in 2002. He was married in London in 1963 to Juliana Leslie Cotton Hill. They divorced in 1984.

== Education ==
He attended Beverly Hills High School and received his A.B. in French/ European History from University of California, Berkeley in 1965. He continued his education at the School of Oriental Studies, Durham University, where he completed his doctoral research (including one year course in Arabic, where he was a member of the Hatfield College Middle Common Room and completed his PhD on the French general and administrator Hubert Lyautey, entitled A study of Marshal Lyautey's Protectorate administration of Morocco, 1912-1925, in relation to the administration of the country, in 1968. (Note: Schom claims a date of 1969 on his personal website. Durham's online depository records the date of submission as being 1967, while the 1968 Durham University Gazette (which listed all degree awards for a given year) indicates his PhD was awarded sometime that year)).

== Career ==
Schom taught French and Modern European History at Southern Connecticut State University and at the University of California, Riverside. He served as the President and Founder of the French Colonial Historical Society (1974–76), and founded its research journal, French Colonial Studies. In 1977 he left academia to become a full-time writer and speaker.

In 1997 Schom prepared the first of two reports for the Simon Wiesenthal Center in Los Angeles on the policies of the Swiss Government toward Jewish refugees during World War II that revealed the presence of up to 80 forced labor camps reserved for Jewish refugees. The reports – actually prepared by Schom and his research assistant], but authored by Schom only – were criticised by a Swiss diplomat in the United States, Thomas G. Borer, who accused Schom of 'shoddy scholarship' in a letter sent to the Los Angeles Times, a completely fraudulent accusation in order to protect his country's historical interests at a time when the Swiss Government was being sued for hundreds of millions of dollars for looted Jewish funds. In Switzerland itself reaction was also highly negative, with President Flavio Cotti denouncing the conclusions of the reports, denying the presence of camps, etc.

Amid the controversy, Simon Wiesenthal expressed displeasure at the publication of these articles, because he was very ill, and after a lifetime of chasing Nazis, was simply worn out, and was no longer strong enough to face another major campaign. Dr Strauss-Schom and Wiesenthal communicated and his situation was discussed. (His wife was also very ill at that time). Schom, for his part, defended the contents of the reports when challenged by reporters at a press conferences in Los Angeles, New York and Paris. Schom presented official copies of the Swiss government documents (found in the Swiss National Archives) in which the highest government officials, in secret meetings held in the office of the Swiss Minister of Justice and Police, Bern. declared their intention to exclude Jewish refugees, an even suppress Jewish schools in Switzerland. President Flavio Cotti attempted to have these documents suppressed, but Dr Strauss-Schom was able to find and publish them first.

=== Controversy on his work about Napoleon ===
Schom has been highly critical of Napoleon. His 1997 900 page biography, Napoleon Bonaparte: A Life, was the first complete revision of Bonaparte's life and career. This the result of a ten-year period of research in the French archives, reveals Napoleon's destructive personality to friends and subjected country, his love of conquest, subjugation and power. He literally held every country in Western and central Europe captive, ensured by the presence of French bayonets, their taxes going to Paris. Napoleon's attempt to exclude Britain from Europe resulted in the destruction of that continent's commerce and economy, resulting in great hardship. A paranoid egotist, everything he did was for himself. His wars resulted in the deaths of one million Frenchmen—excluding those his enemies. Many tens of thousands of women and girls were raped by his troops as they marched through Europe over a period of 15 years. Schom "even casts doubt on Napoleon's military genius", even though, he is widely considered to be one. Napoleon was in the final analysis, a terrorist, the worst in European history until the arrival of Hitler and Stalin. He did bring order to France, including new law codes. (He introduced the concept followed to this day, that anyone accused by the police was and is automatically guilty. If is for the accused to prove his innocence.

Schom also thinks, contrary to all serious historians such as Thierry Lentz (Fondation Napoléon), Jean Tulard (Sorbonne and the Institut de France), Patrice Gueniffey, Sir Andrew Roberts, David A. Bell (Princeton), that Napoleon was poisoned on Saint-Helena.

The work saw Schom accused in some quarters of failing to present an objective view of Napoleon's career. His book was listed at the second place in the Los Angeles Times Annual National Book award in 1997 in the field of biography. Schom's history of the first two years of World War II, The Eagle and the Rising Sun: The Japanese-American War, 1941-1943: Pearl Harbor through Guadalcanal has received the highest acclaim from senior military officers, including former First Sea Lord, Admiral Sir Henry Leach.

== Selected works ==
As Alan Scham

- Lyautey in Morocco, Protectorate Administration 1912-1925 (Berkeley: University of California Press, 1970)

As Alan Schom

- Emile Zola, A Biography (New York: Henry Holt, 1987); Emile Zola: A Bourgeois Rebel (London: Queen Anne Press, 1987)
- Trafalgar, Countdown to Battle, 1803-1805 (New York: Oxford University Press, 1990 and London, Penguin Books)
- One Hundred Days, Napoleon's Road to Waterloo (New York: Oxford University Press, 1993 and London: Penguin Books)
- Napoleon Bonaparte, A Biography (New York: HarperCollins, 1997)
- The Eagle and the Rising Sun—The Japanese-American War, 1941-1943 (NY: WW Norton, 2005)

As Alan Strauss-Schom

- The Shadow Emperor: A Biography of Napoleon III (US edition: St. Martin's Press, 2018 / UK edition: Amberley, 2018)
