= Jean Baechler =

French Sociologist and Political Scientist

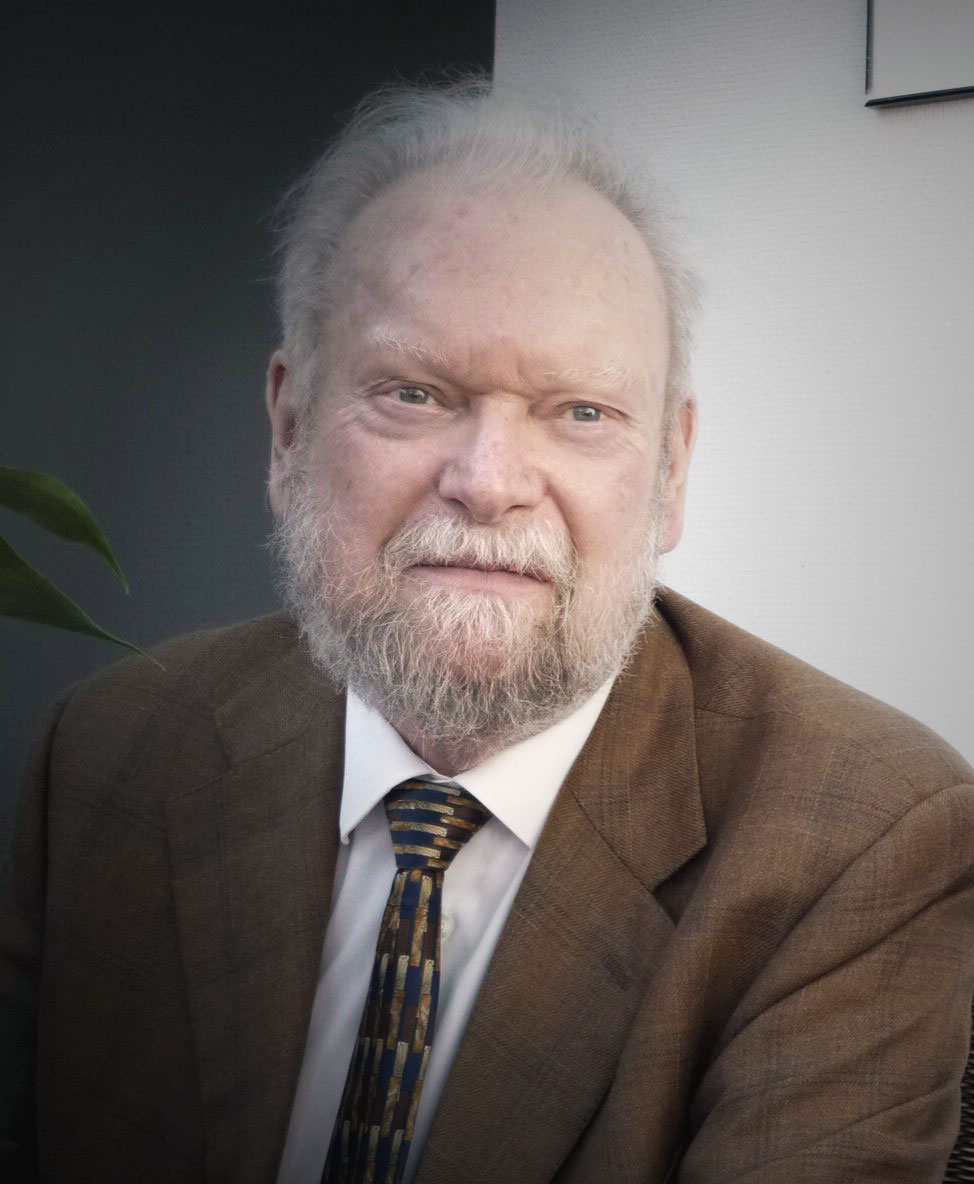
Jean Baechler

Jean Baechler, born 28 March 1937 in Thionville (Moselle) and died 13 August 2022 in Draveil, was a French academic and sociologist.

Full professor and later emeritus of Historical sociology at the Sorbonne, he was a member of the Académie des Sciences Morales et Politiques, elected on 6 December 1999 to the Sociology section. to the seat vacated by the transfer of Alain Besançon.

His major contributions to the field of anthropological and historical sociological knowledge pertain to a philosophical overhaul of the human sciences (or general anthropology), a general theory of 'power' and political regimes, the long-term history of democratic regimes in relation to various types of social organization (bands, tribes, cities, nations), the history of social morphologies, a non-relativistic virtue ethics, and a sociological explanation of the conditions underpinning the emergence of major religious and secular metaphysics, particularly during the Axial Age.

== Biography ==
Graduating in philosophy and history in University of Strasbourg and Doctor in Sociology from Sorbonne University, Jean Baechler has devoted much of his life to teaching and research. He began his career as a history-geography teacher at the Lycée Montesquieu in Le Mans (1962–1966), before meeting Raymond Aron and lecturing in sociology at the Sorbonne from 1966 to 1969, then from 1969 to 1986, at the École Pratique des Hautes Études, which became the École des Hautes Études en Sciences Sociales (EHESS) in 1975. From 1975 to 2006, he was seminar leader for the DEA in sociology at Paris IV, Paris V and Paris X. He also became a research associate at the CNRS in 1966, a research fellow in 1969 and then director of research in the sociology section from 1977 to 1988. In 1988, he left the CNRS to take up the chair of Historical sociology at the Sorbonne (Paris-IV). He taught there until 2006. He was elected to the Académie des Sciences Morales et Politiques in 1999. President of the Académie des sciences morales et politiques and Institut de France for 2011.

Jean Baechler was a member of the Centre européen de sociologie historique directed by Raymond Aron (1969–1984). In 1984, he became a member of the Groupe d'études des méthodes de l'analyse sociologique (GEMASS) founded by Raymond Boudon. He was Honorary Chairman of the Association philotechnique.

== Work ==
Acclaimed by the sociologists' profession, and far beyond,[2] Jean Baechler is the author of a body of work that is not only voluminous (34 books and 270 articles) but also dense in conceptual and historical systematics. It combines a general theory of man with a comparative historical sociology of human societies. Its fundamental thrust is to explore how, in different civilizational spheres, human potentialities (virtual), envisaged as universal, have actually taken shape (actualizations) under the influence of various historical and sociological factors that can be explained.

=== Initial milestones ===
Jean Baechler began his work with an exploration of Trotskyism (Politique de Trotsky, 1968), at the request of Jean Touchard, and then went on to produce a typological and historical comparison of Phénomènes révolutionnaires (1970; Revolution, 1975). In a seminal 1969 article on the origins of the capitalist system, he then developed a primarily "political" explanation of the problem, rather than an economic one like Marx or a culturalist one like Max Weber (refuting Marx). This text was subsequently reprinted, translated into English (The Origins of Capitalism, 1975), and completely recast in an expanded version in two large volumes, under the title Le capitalisme (1995). In 1975, under the supervision of Raymond Aron, Jean Baechler presented his doctoral thesis about "Les suicides" (1975 in French; English translation, 1979). He adopted a "strategic" approach to action, a perspective he would maintain thereafter, and identified twelve characteristic meanings of suicide. This provided a universal historical outlook on the existential 'problems' faced by individuals considering suicide as a potential "solution". His analysis simultaneously explores the socio-historical conditions conducive to suicide and the interpretative choices made by those who take their own lives. The diversity of situations is reduced to a limited number of types, and this analysis has occasionally been misinterpreted as a radical challenge to Durkheim's theories regarding suicide-inducing forces without a subject.

=== Baechlerian concepts ===
==== Modes of power ====
After completing his doctorate, Jean Baechler turned his attention to analyzing the essential foundations of ideology in Qu'est-ce que l'idéologie (1976), and explored the main attributes of political power, presiding over the historical actualization of its mechanisms (Le pouvoir pur, 1978). By defining the three modes of power as "coercion," "authority" and "direction," he laid the foundations for a rigorous general theory of "political regimes," "power relations" and the dissimilar logics of political consent. This analysis of power is a conceptual breakthrough and paves the way for comparative sociological analysis of the historical actualizations of the phenomenon.

==== Social morphologies ====
Hereafter Jean Baechler embarked on a vast historical sociological investigation of "democracy," breaking new ground on two counts. On the one hand, he placed the logic of democracy within a very long human history, dating back to the Upper Paleolithic, and in so doing, broke with the common genealogy that began with the Greek cities of the classical age. On the other hand, it complicates the analysis of power relations and modes of political consent by taking into account the type of social organization underlying each historical variant of the democratic regime. In the wake of American social anthropology, the concept of "social morphology" was put forward, along with a strict typology of bands, tribes, cities, chiefdoms, principalities, kingdoms, empires and nations (cf. Démocraties in 1985, Democracy: an analytical survey in 1995, and Précis de philosophie politique in 2014). His Esquisse d'une histoire universelle (2002) and Les morphologies sociales (2005) summarize the fundamental historical theses of his general sociology. As for the question of war and international relations, they are inseparable from this general theory and sociology of politics. They are present in all his work, and are systematically set out in the summary work Guerre, Histoire et Société (2019).

==== "Orders" of activity ====
In Jean Baechler's anthropology and historical sociology, the "political order" of human activities always assumes a predominant causal valence and sensitivity. It is the political order that has the greatest influence on all the other orders of activity (economic, demographic, technical, ethical, etc.). This is due to the very nature of power (Le pouvoir pur, 1978), since its "power" mode (versus "authority" and "direction") is always potentially capable, through its internal coercive (autocratic) and external bellicose expressions, of expressing dysfunction and radically impacting all other orders of human activity. Radical assessments and open violence are the hallmarks of this.

But while "politics" is causally primary, for Jean Baechler it remains anthropologically secondary in terms of ultimate ends: it constitutes a "service," ancillary order, and is not the type of activity in which the question of the meaning of human existence is played out. This is why Baechler's political philosophy and historical sociology are not at the center of his anthropological reflection, but need to be understood as subordinate moments of a more general enquiry.

In the 2000s, Jean Baechler systematized his non-essentialist thinking on "human nature" and its concrete manifestations within thirteen specific "orders" of activity. Each of these orders corresponds to the resolution of an unavoidable "problem" of existential "survival" or "destination" for individuals as well as for human groups. Among these orders, Baechler counts the demographic, the hygienic, the economic, the technical, the political, the pedagogical, the ludic, the morphological (solidarity mechanisms), the sodalic (group formations), the agoric (networks), the normative, the eschatic (metaphysical) and the staseological (critical). The work Nature et histoire (2000) makes this clear, and is a breakthrough for the human and social sciences, which have always been in search of the fundamental generative structures of history. Certain aspects of this extensive anthropological opus were subsequently taken up, clarified and expanded in the three related books Agir, faire, connaître (2008), La nature humaine (2009) and Les matrices culturelles (2009).

The two books entitled Qu'est-ce que l'humain? Liberté, finalité, rationalité (2014) and Modèles d'humanité (2019) summarize the author's general assumptions on the fundamental "virtualities" of the human from the initial schema of "freedom." This freedom is seen as a genetic non-programming of the species, involving its "finalized," "rational" but intrinsically "fallible" historical condition. Over time in the form of those mentioned works, J. Baechler ultimately developed a general treatise on man and human societies, in other words an "anthropological sum" on the one hand and a comparative historical sociology of world history on the other.

==== Final ends ====
Also applied to the analysis of final ends, beyond the ancillary ends of survival, this general anthropology encompasses both an anti-relativist ethics of the "bonne vie bonne" (Les Fins dernières, 2006) and a classification of metaphysical rationalities dealing with the question of the "destination's ends" of human existence. Jean Baechler ended up calling this last metaphysical order the "eschatic" (La Spiritualité, 2021) for want of a better lexicon, doctrinally neutral in everyday language, to designate the "things of the end," i.e. the metaphysical questions about the meaning of life that human beings cannot fail to ask themselves. The notion of "religious" is unsuitable for this purpose, as it excludes from its scope non-religious explorations of the problem of the end and meaning of life, which is a feature of philosophies.

This "eschatic" order is the subject of a twofold investigation. The first is a properly metaphysical reflection on the logically possible justifications for the question of the Absolute. Two major variants emerge, one secular ("absolute," lower case) and the other religious ("Absolute," upper case). The second part of the investigation focuses on the historical identification and sociological explanation of the main factors in the historical emergence and doctrinal clarification of each of these major metaphysical options, via individual and group explorers of the eschatic or "destination's ends" ("philosophers," "metaphysicians," "priests," sects, networks, churches, political parasitism of it, etc.). For the great metaphysical propositions about the final ends did not emerge at any time, in any place or in any way: the secular path of Becoming ("Devenir") was exemplified in ancient China and Greece, the religious paths of the monotheisms (Judaism, Christianity, Islam) in West Asia, and Vedic and then Hindu Atmanism in India. These three great coherences of metaphysical rationality therefore need to be explained in terms of the sociological conditions of their emergence, which can only be identified through the long comparative approach of historical sociology.

=== Ultimate work ===
Jean Baechler died on 13 August 2022, shortly after completing the first volume of his planned trilogy on the Sociologie historique de l'Absolu. This final work provides a macro-sociologically rigorous answer to the classic problem of the "Axial Age" for each civilizational area, from the Upper Paleolithic to the era of planetary globalization. Initially raised by Max Weber and then Karl Jaspers, this problem remains a central question in the historical sociology of religions, which has yet to be resolved by examining the various historical factors that have contributed to the actualization of the phenomenon. It has never been integrated into a joint metaphysical and sociological analysis, going beyond a simple philosophical re-description of the axial emergences in various civilizational areas.

Sociologie historique de l'Absolu sets out to provide a long-term sociological explanation by the three combined means of philosophy, history and sociology. "Philosophy" takes charge of the rigorous conceptual definition, as an eschatological "virtual", of the three metaphysically coherent options of the question of the unconditioned (A(a)bsolu); "History" documents the past explorations of the problem according to the types of traces accessible to the investigation (parietal art, statuary, myths, texts, religions, philosophies, etc.); and "Sociology" completes the Baechlerian method – continuously tripartite, on this question as on the rest – by formulating an explanatory hypothesis as to the concrete factors that have made it possible to actualize the three metaphysical options that have virtually always been thinkable – i.e. since the beginning of the documentation of the problem by tangible artefacts, from the Upper Paleolithic onwards.

== Bibliography ==
In English

- 1975 : translation: Revolution, Harper & Row.
- 1975 : The Origins of Capitalism, Blackwell.
- 1979 : Suicides, Basic Books.
- 1988 : Europe and the rise of Capitalism (dir. with Michael Mann (sociologue) and John A. Hall ).
- 1995 : Democracy: An Analytical Survey, UNESCO Publishing.

In French

- 1968 : Politique de Trotsky (Texts collection and analysis), Armand Colin, col. "U"
- 1970 : Les Phénomènes révolutionnaires, PUF, col. "SUP".
- 1971 : Les Origines du capitalisme, Gallimard.
- 1975 : Les Suicides (from his PhD thesis, directed by Raymond Aron), Calmann Lévy. Re-ed. Hermann, 2009.
- 1976 : Qu'est-ce que l'idéologie ? Ed. de poche, Idées, Gallimard No. 345.
- 1978 : Le Pouvoir pur, Calmann Lévy.
- 1985 : Démocraties, col. liberté de l'esprit, Calmann Lévy.
- 1988 : La Solution indienne. Essai sur les origines du régime des castes, PUF.
- 1993 : La Grande Parenthèse (1914-1991). Essai sur un accident de l'histoire, Calmann Lévy.
- 1994 : Précis de la démocratie, Calmann Lévy- Unesco.
- 1995 : Le Capitalisme, 2 vol. Col. Folio Histoire.
- 1996 : Contrepoints et commentaires (recueil d'articles parus dans ces revues), Calmann Lévy.
- 2000 : Nature et histoire, PUF.
- 2002 : Esquisse d'une histoire universelle, Fayard
- 2003 : Aspects de la mondialisation politique, PUF
- 2005 : Les Morphologies sociales, col. Sociologies, PUF.
- 2006 : Les Fins Dernières, Hermann
- 2008 : Agir, faire, connaître, Hermann
- 2009 : Les Matrices culturelles. Au foyer des cultures et des civilisations, Hermann
- 2009 : La Nature humaine, Hermann
- 2010 : Le Devenir, Hermann
- 2011 : La Perfection, Hermann
- 2012 : La Disqualification des experts, Hermann
- 2013 : L'Être. Les fondements métaphysiques de la hiérologie, Hermann
- 2014 : Qu'est-ce que l'humain ?, Hermann, coll. "Hermann philosophie", 2014
- 2014 : Précis d'éthique, Hermann
- 2014 : Précis de philosophie politique, Hermann
- 2015 : Recréer le système monétaire international, Hermann (with Jean-Claude Trichet and Michel Pébereau).
- 2017 : En Quête de l'Absolu, Vérités et erreurs religieuses, Hermann
- 2019 : Que valent nos connaissances, éd. Hermann.
- 2019 : De l'art à la culture, Hermann.
- 2019 : Guerre, Histoire et Société : Éléments de polémologie, Hermann.
- 2019 : Modèles d'humanité : Humanisme et mondialisation, Hermann.
- 2020 : Écologie ou écologisme ? : Raison et pertinence des politiques environnementales, Hermann.
- 2021 : La Spiritualité, Hermann
- 2021 : L'Irrationnel aujourd'hui (with Gérald Bronner)
- 2022 : L'intime, Hermann.
- 2023 : Sociologie historique de l'Absolu, Hermann.
- 2024 (forthcoming) : La résilience démocratique (with Alexandre Escudier), Hermann.

From 2013 to 2016, Jean Baechler led a series of seventeen colloquia and seminars on war at the Académie des sciences morales & politiques, culminating in the publication of the following proceedings:

- 2014 : Guerre et Politique (with Jean-Vincent Holeindre), Hermann.
- 2014 : Penseurs de la stratégie (with Jean-Vincent Holeindre), Hermann.
- 2016 : Guerre et Religion, Hermann.
- 2016 : Guerre, Économie et Fiscalité (with Georges-Henri Soutou), Hermann.
- 2017 : Guerre et Droit (with Jean Delvolvé), Hermann.
- 2017 : L'Arrière (with Frédéric Ramel), Hermann.
- 2018 : Guerre et technique (with Christian Malis), Hermann.
- 2018 : Guerre et psychologie, (with Laure Bardiès), Hermann.
- 2018 : Les armées (with Bernard Boëne), Hermann.
- 2018 : La guerre civile, Hermann.
- 2018 : La bataille, (with Olivier Chaline), Hermann.
- 2018 : La guerre et les femmes (with Marion Trévisi), Hermann.
- 2018 : Guerre et santé, (with Michèle Battesti), Hermann.
- 2018 : La guerre et les arts, Hermann.
- 2019 : Guerre et Histoire, Hermann.
- 2019 : Figures de la guerre, Hermann.
- 2019 : Le retour du nucléaire militaire (with Georges-Henir Soutou), Hermann.
- 2019 : La guerre et les éléments, (with Jérôme Lespinois), Hermann.

== Distinctions ==
- Officier de la Légion d'honneur'
- Chevalier de l'ordre des Palmes académiques.
