= Janine Chanteur =

French philosopher

Janine Chanteur (died on 5 June 2015) was a French philosopher. She was a professor emeritus of moral and political philosophy at the Paris-Sorbonne University.

== Biography ==
Chanteur was made an associate professor of philosopher in 1978 when she was awarded her doctorate. She later became a professor of moral and political philosophy at the University of Paris-Sorbonne (Paris IV). In 1989, she was elected to the position of Secretary General of the International Institute of Political Philosophy. Between 1985 and 1997, she oversaw 29 theses.

She married the medical professor, Jean Chanteur, with whom she has five children.

She was a member of the Academy of Education and the Social Studies (AES). She died on June 5, 2015.

== Publications ==
Chanteur has published numerous articles and books, including:

- Condamnés à mort ou condamnés à vivre? Autour de l'arrêt Perruche (Condemned to death or condemned to live? Perruche's Judgement), Factuel, 2002

Commentary of Patrick Verspieren in the journal Études

- Comment l'esprit vint à l'homme ou l'aventure de la liberté (How the spirit came to humans or the adventure of freedom), L'Harmattan, 2001
- Du droit des bêtes à disposer d'elles-mêmes (The rights of Animals to self-determination), Seuil, 1993
- La paix, un défi contemporain (Peace, a contemporary challenge), L'Harmattan, 1995
- Les petits-enfants de Job : une enfance meurtrie (The grandchildren of Job: a wounded childhood), Seuil, 1990
- De la guerre à la paix (From War to Peace), PUF, 1989

Commentary of Marie-Lucy Dumas published in 1989 in the journal Politique étrangère, year 1989, volume 54, issue 4, pages 808-809
Daily CommentaryL'Humanité published on the 21 avril 2003

- Platon, le désir et la cité (Plato, the desire and the city), Sirey, collection "philosophie politique", 1980

== Awards and honours ==
She was honoured as a commander of the National order of Merit.

In 1990, Chanteur received the Prix Biguet from the Académie française; it is an annual award to recognise French literature; although it can be awarded for work in the fields of history, sociology, and philosophy. She received it for her work De la guerre à la paix (From war to peace).

In 1991, she was the prize laureate for believing writers for her work Les petits enfants de Job (The grandchildren of Job).

In 2002, Chanteur received the Gallet Prize from Académie des sciences morales et politiques for Condamnés à mort ou condamnés à vivre? Autour de l'arrêt Perruche (Condemned to death or condemned to live? Perruche's Judgement).
