= Centre de recherches politiques Raymond Aron =

French research center

The Centre de recherche politiques Raymond Aron (CESPRA; named after Raymond Aron) is the research center of the École des hautes études en sciences sociales (Paris) that specializes in political philosophy.

Created by François Furet in 1982, the center's goal was to give a new basis to the study of politics in France and moving away from the dominant marxist paradigm. Its members have been at the forefront of the rediscovery of the French liberal tradition and the reintroduction of classical philosophy in contemporary political studies.

The center's seminars concentrate on a multidisciplinary approach (Philosophy, History, Sociology and Law).

The CRPRA holds seminars solely for master's and doctoral students.

== Members ==
- Agnès Antoine
- François Azouvi
- Monique Canto-Sperber, also director of the École normale supérieure
- Vincent Descombes, also visiting professor at the University of Chicago
- Luc Foisneau
- Marcel Gauchet
- Patrice Gueniffey
- Ran Halévy
- Claude Lefort
- Catherine Maire
- Pierre Manent, also visiting professor at Boston College
- Mona Ozouf, Directrice de recherche, CNRS
- Philippe Raynaud, also member of l’Institut Universitaire de France
- Olivier Remaud
- Lucien Karpik
