= Gladys Swain =

French psychiatrist (1945–1993)

Gladys Swain (1945–1993) was a French psychiatrist who is remembered today for her books about the history of French Psychiatry and her critique of the views of Michel Foucault on the changing attitudes towards madness in western civilization.

Swain's best known works are Le subject de la folie (1977), Dialogue avec l'insensé (1994), and Le vrai Charcot (1997), the last two co-authored with Marcel Gauchet. Her disagreements with Foucault are on two levels. On a factual level she provides new information about the beginnings of psychiatry in France through the efforts of Pinel and his followers. On a philosophical level she takes issue with Foucault's view that the locking up of the insane in asylums after about 1800 was caused by a growing intolerance of what is strange or different. While agreeing that in the Middle Ages the insane were accepted as part of society and free to wander about, she attributes the creation of the first asylums to the discovery that the insane were not mindless or controlled by outside forces, but were full human beings whose problems could perhaps be understood and mitigated. She does agree that the first efforts to do so were harsh and clumsy, but denies they were aimed purely at repression, as Foucault thought.

== Works ==
- Le sujet de la folie: Naissance de la psychiatrie., 1977, ISBN 2708930133
- with Marcel Gauchet: La pratique de l’esprit humain. L'institution asilaire et la révolution démocratique, Paris, Gallimard, 1980
- with Marcel Gauchet: Dialogue avec l'insensé: Essais d'histoire de la psychiatrie., Paris, Gallimard 1994, ISBN 2070739082
- with Marcel Gauchet: Le vrai Charcot, Calmann-Levy, 1997.
