= L'Arche (magazine) =

French publication

L'Arche is a Jewish news magazine in France. The magazine was started in 1950 and is published on a monthly basis. It is headquartered in Paris. Its contributors include Michel Gurfinkiel.
