= Michel Gurfinkiel =

Michel Gurfinkiel (1 August 1948, Paris) is a French conservative journalist and public intellectual. He served as editor-in-chief of Valeurs Actuelles from 1985 to 2006.

== Biography ==
He served as editor-in-chief of Perspectives from 1984 to 1985, and of Valeurs actuelles from 1985 to 2006. He serves on the editorial board of Valeurs acutelles and Commentaire. His work has also been published in Commentary Magazine, The Weekly Standard, The Wall Street Journal, PJ Media, The New York Sun, Politique Internationale, Le Figaro, L'Arche, Limes, Outre-Terre, The Times, The European, The Middle East Quarterly, The Jerusalem Post, Azure, Nativ: A Journal of Politics and the Arts, The Jewish Review of Books, etc.

He has been a board member of the Conseil Représentatif des Institutions juives de France since 1995. In 2003, he founded the Jean-Jacques Rousseau Institute. He has been a fellow of the Middle East Forum since 2012. He is the recipient of the National Order of Merit. He lives in Paris.

== Bibliography ==
- Israël, géopolitique d'une paix (Éditions Michalon, 1996)
- Le Retour de la Russie (with Vladimir Fedorovski, Odile Jacob, 2001),
- La Cuisson du homard : réflexion intempestive sur la nouvelle guerre d'Israël (Éditions Michalon, 2001)
- Le Roman d'Odessa (Éditions du Rocher, 2005)
- Le testament d'Ariel Sharon (Éditions du Rocher, 2006)
- Le Roman d'Israël (Éditions du Rocher, 2008)
- Un devoir de mémoire (Jean-Paul Bertrand, 2008)
- Israël peut-il survivre? La Nouvelle Règle du Jeu (Hugo & Cie, 2011)
