= Françoise Thom =

French historian (born 1951)

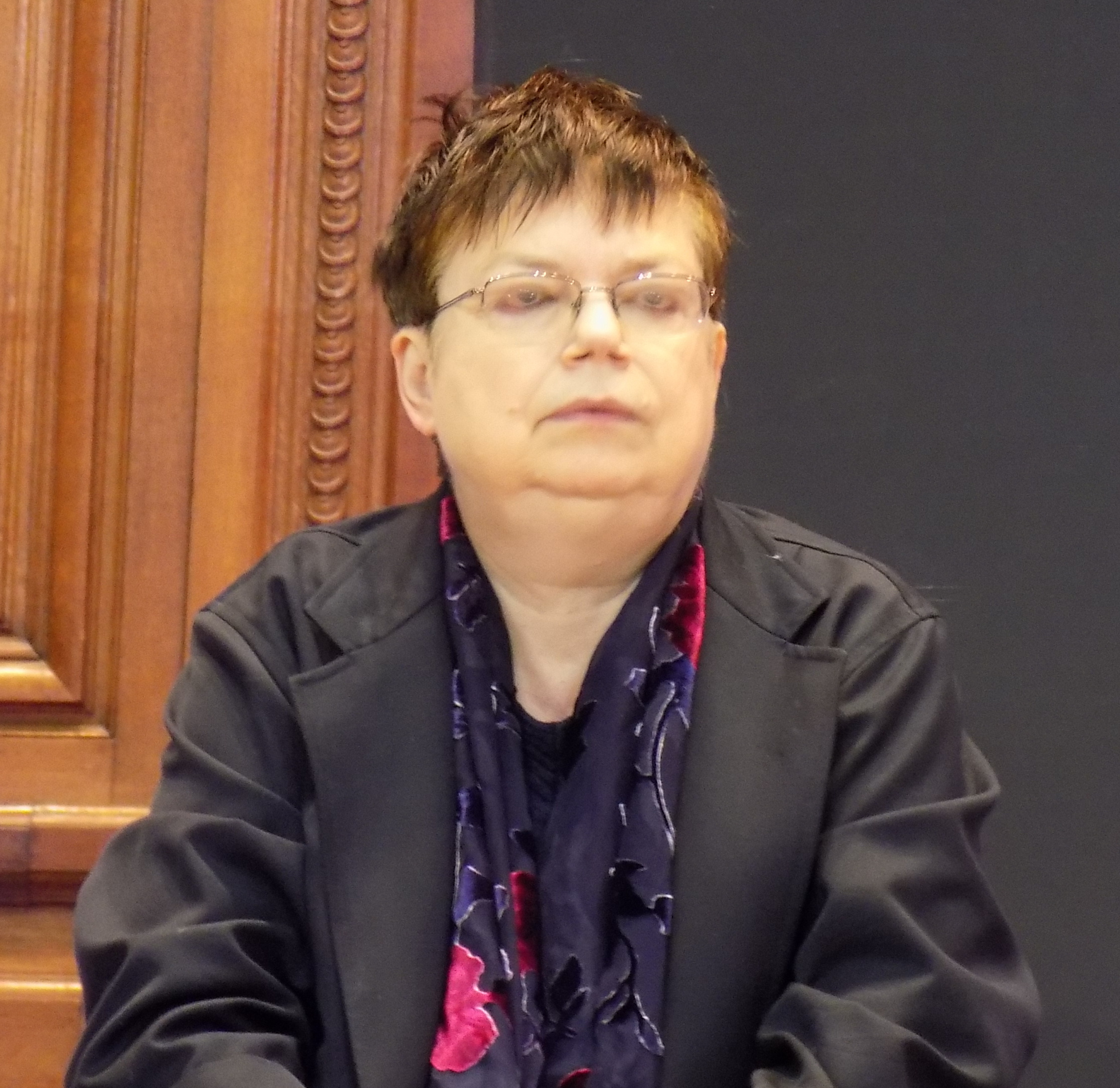
- Born: 1951 (age 74–75); Strasbourg, France
- Occupation: Historian
- Spouse: Georges Mamoulia (m. 2005)
- Parent: René Thom

Academic background
- Education: Paris-Sorbonne University
- Thesis: De l'URSS à la Russie (1929-2011). Politique intérieure, politique étrangère, les imbrications (2011)
- Doctoral advisor: Olivier Forcade
- Other advisor: Alain Besançon

Academic work
- Discipline: Contemporary history
- Sub-discipline: Sovietology
- Institutions: Paris-Sorbonne University

Françoise Thom (French pronunciation: [fʁɑ̃swaz tɔm]; born 1951) is a French historian and Sovietologist, honorary lecturer in contemporary history at Paris-Sorbonne University. A specialist in post-communist Russia, she is the author of works of political analysis on the country and its leaders.

== Early life and education ==
Françoise Thom was born in Strasbourg, 1951. Her parents are René Thom, a mathematician known for his theory of catastrophes and winner of the Fields Medal, and of Suzanne Helmlinger. Françoise has two siblings, Elizabeth and Christian.

Thom has a degree in Russian.

== Career ==
She lived for three years in the Soviet Union, then taught Russian in secondary schools in Ferney-Voltaire and Calais. She is a research associate at the Institut français de polémologie. In 1983, she defended a thesis entitled La Langue de bois soviétique : description, rôle et fonctionnement, directed by Alain Besançon at the School for Advanced Studies in the Social Sciences.

She was then appointed lecturer in contemporary history at Paris-Sorbonne University. In 2011, she presented a dissertation entitled De l'URSS à la Russie (1929-2011). Politique intérieure, politique étrangère, les imbrications, for which Olivier Forcade was the supervisor, at the Paris-Sorbonne University.

She published her thesis in a book entitled, La Langue de bois, in 1987. She also published L'École des barbares, with Isabelle Stal, in 1985, Le Moment Gorbatchev (1989), and Les Fins du communisme (1994).

In 1998, she co-authored, with Jean Foyer, Jacques Julliard, and Jean-Pierre Thiollet, the book, La Pensée unique - Le vrai procès. She collected, translated, prefaced and annotated the memoirs and analyses of Sergo Beria, son of Lavrentiy Beria, published in 1999 under the title Beria, mon père : au cœur du pouvoir stalinien. In 2013, she finally published a biography of Beria, under the title Beria. le Janus du Kremlin. In 2018, she published Comprendre le poutinisme (Understanding Putinism), in which she recalls Vladimir Putin's former membership in the KGB and studies the "propaganda of Russian power".

== Personal life ==
In April 2005, she married historian Georges Mamoulia.

== Selected works ==
=== Books ===
- L'École des barbares, with Isabelle Stal, Paris, Julliard, 1985
- La langue de bois, Paris, Julliard, 1987
- Les fins du communisme, Paris, Critérion, 1994
- Le Moment Gorbatchev, Paris, Hachette, 1989
- Beria : Le Janus du Kremlin, Paris, Cerf, 2013 924 p. ISBN 978-2204101585
- Géopolitique de la Russie, with Jean-Sylvestre Mongrenier, Paris, PUF, collection "Que sais-je?", 2016
- Comprendre le poutinisme, Paris/Perpignan, Desclée De Brouwer, 2018, 240 p. ISBN 978-2-220-09426-7
- La Marche à rebours. Regards sur l’histoire soviétique et russe, Paris, Sorbonne Université Presses, collection "Mondes contemporains", 2021, 724 p. ISBN 979-10-231-0686-2
- Poutine ou l'obsession de la puissance, Litos, 2022, 248 p.

=== Articles ===
- "Les Occidentaux devant la fin de l’Union soviétique", Commentaire, no 118, February 2007, pp. 373–382
- "Le parti russe en France", Commentaire, February 2016, pp. 432–436

=== Editor ===
- Beria, Sergo, Beria, mon père : au cœur du pouvoir stalinien, Plon/Critérion, 1999, 448 p. ISBN 9782259190169
