= Jean Canavaggio =

French biographer (1936–2023)

- Born: 23 July 1936; Paris, France
- Died: 21 August 2023 (aged 87); Paris, France
- Education: École normale supérieure
- Occupations: Biographer; Professor

Jean Canavaggio (23 July 1936 – 21 August 2023) was a French biographer and emeritus professor of Spanish literature at the Paris West University Nanterre La Défense.

== Biography ==
Born in Paris in 1936, he was a student of the École normale supérieure (class 1956), Jean Canavaggio was a biographer and specialist of Cervantès. In 2001, he directed a new translation of his complete novels in the Bibliothèque de la Pléiade. From 1988 to 1992, he was president of the jury of external agrégation of Spanish. From 1996 to 2001, he was director of the Casa de Velázquez at Madrid. He was corresponding member of the Real Academia de la Lengua and the Real Academia de la Historia (Madrid) and honorary fellow of the Hispanic Society of America (New York). His work in the Cervantian domain is now authoritative.

Canavaggio dies of cancer in Paris on 21 August 2023, at the age of 87.

== Honors and awards ==
- Knight of the Order of Legion of Honour
- Commander of the Order of Isabella the Catholic
- Grand Cross of the Civil Order of Alfonso X, the Wise

== Articles ==
(complete list)

- 1958: Alonso López Pinciano y la estética literaria de Cervantes en el Quijote, Anales cervantinos, 8, pp. 13–108.
- 1966: A propos de deux « comedias » de Cervantès: quelques remarques sur un manuscrit récemment retrouvé, Bulletin hispanique, 68, pp. 5–29.
- 1972: Variations cervantines sur le thème du théâtre au théâtre, Revue des Sciences humaines, 37, pp. 53–68
- 1976: Teatro y comediantes en el Siglo de Oro: algunos datos inéditos, Segismundo, 12, pp. 27–51.
- 1977: Cervantes en primera persona, Journal of Hispanic Philology, 2, pp. 35–44.
- 1984: La dimensión autobiográfica del Viaje del Parnaso, Cervantes, 1, pp. 29–41.
- 1984: Publications récentes sur le théâtre du Siècle d'Or, Bulletin hispanique, 86, pp. 215–219.
- 1989: Agi Morato, de historia a ficción, Crítica hispánica, 11, pp. 17–22.
- 1994: La figura del rey en el teatro de Cervantes, Crítica hispánica, 16, pp. 31–42.
- 2003: L'Espagne du Persiles, Les Langues Néo-latines, nº 237, December, pp. 21–38
- 2004: Don Quijote, vencedor del Caballero de los Espejos : el epílogo de un triunfo por escarnio (II, 16), Bulletin of Spanish Studies, 81, pp. 495–499.
- 2013: Don Quichotte : un mythe pour notre temps ? - Revue "Études" May (Tome 418), pp 653– 664

== Collective works ==
=== Coordination ===
(some references)

- 1988: Le Siècle d'Or espagnol, n° spécial de XVIIe Siècle, 40th year, n° 160, 54 p. (presentation and coordination).
- 1993–1994: Histoire de la Littérature espagnole (general coor. and collab.), Paris, Fayard, tome I, 1993; tome II, 1994, 830 p. (Spanish translation, Barcelona, Ariel, 1994–95, 6 volumes).
- 1995: El Siglo de Oro de las Letras en España : invención y avatares de un concepto (coord.), Mélanges de la Casa de Velázquez, 31-2, p, 145-230.
- 2001: Cervantès, œuvres romanesques complètes : t. I, Don Quichotte, précédé de La Galatée; t. II, Nouvelles exemplaires, suivies de Persilès et Sigismunda, introduction, traduction et notes, av. la collaboration de Claude Allaigre, Michel Moner et Jean-Marc Pelorson, Paris, Gallimard, Bibliothèque de La Pléiade

=== Participation ===
(some titles)

- 1965: L'Espagne au temps de Philippe II (in collaboration with P. Vilar, P. Chaunu, H. Lapeyre, M. Devèze and P. Guinard), Paris, Hachette
- 1981: Las figuras del donaire en las comedias de Cervantes, Risa y sociedad en el teatro del Siglo de Oro, Toulouse, CNRS, pp. 51–67.
- 1984: Refranero et comedia dans l'Espagne du Siècle d'Or: quatre personnages en quête d'auteur, Le personnage dans la littérature du Siècle d'Or, Paris, pp. 81–88
- 1990: L'Espagne de Don Quichotte, La Méditerranée occidentale au XVIe, Actes du Colloque de 1989 de l'Association des Historiens Modernistes, n° 14, Paris, pp. 111–124 (Spanish translation « La España del Quijote », Insula, n° 538, Oct. 1991, p. 7-8).
- 2004: La muerte deseada en las obras de Cervantes, Carlos Romero Muñoz (ed.), Le mappe nascoste di Cervantes, Treviso, Santi Quaranta, pp. 9–24.

== Works ==
- 1977: Cervantès dramaturge: un théâtre à naître, Paris, Presses universitaires de France
- 1986: Cervantès, Paris, Mazarine, 1986 (bourse Goncourt de la biographie) (Spanish, Italian, German, English, Japanese, Portuguese translations)
- 1993–1994: Histoire de la littérature espagnole (coord. and collab.), Fayard, tome 1, 1993; tome 2, 1994. Spanish translation, Barcelona, Ariel, 1994-1995, 6 volumes
- 1995: La Comedia, Madrid, Casa de Velázquez (CCV, 48)
- 2000: Un mundo abreviado: aproximaciones al teatro aureo, Madrid/Frankfurt am Main, Iberoamericana/Vervuert
- 2000: Cervantes entre vida y creacion, Alcala de Henares
- 2001: Cervantès, Œuvres romanesques complètes, t. I, Don Quichotte, preceded by La Galatée; t. II, Nouvelles exemplaires, suivies de Persilès et Segismunda, introduction, translation and notes in collaboration with Claude Allaigre, Michel Moner and Jean-Marc Pelorson, Paris, Éditions Gallimard, Bibliothèque de la Pléiade
- 2005: Don Quichotte, du livre au mythe : quatre siècles d'errance, Fayard; (Spanish and Italian translations in 2006) Prix Roland de Jouvenel of the Académie française - (Book downlable here)

== Bibliography ==
- "Bibliographie des travaux de Jean Canavaggio", in "Por discreto y por amigo". Mélanges offerts à Jean Canavaggio, Christophe Couderc and Benoît Pellistrandi (eds.), Madrid, Casa de Velázquez (CCV, 88), 2005, p. 1-12.
