= Jean-Claude Casanova =

French economist

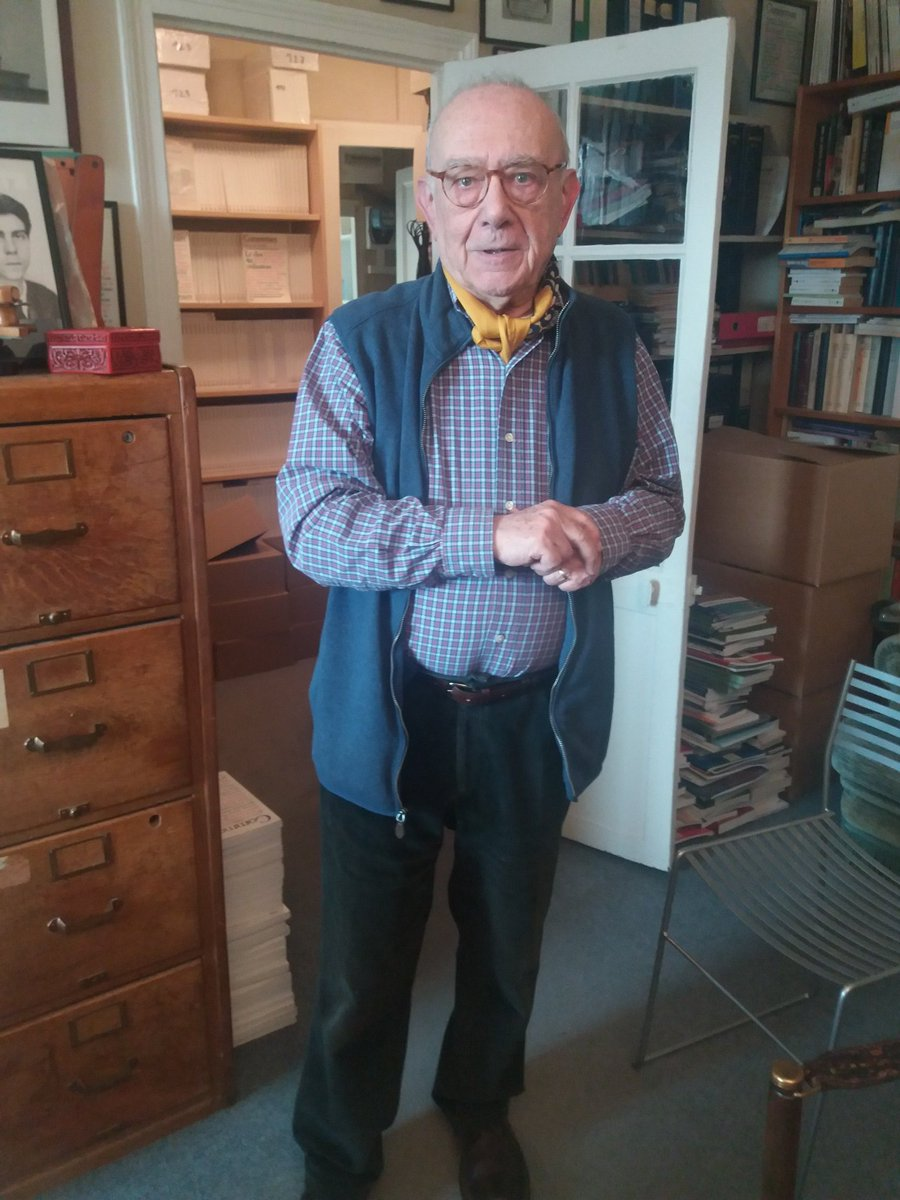
- Casanova in March 2021

President of the Fondation Nationale des Sciences Politiques
- In office 2007–2016
- Preceded by: René Rémond
- Succeeded by: Olivier Duhamel

Personal details
- Born: 11 June 1934 (age 91) Ajaccio, Corsica, Italy
- Education: Lycée Carnot de Tunis
- Alma mater: Sciences Po
- Profession: Economist

Jean-Claude Casanova (born 11 June 1934) is a French economist, educator and public intellectual with a lifetime involvement in French civic life. He was the chairman of the Fondation Nationale des Sciences Politiques between 2007 and 2016. A centrist in politics, he cofounded the journal Commentaire with Raymond Aron in 1978, and since then has been its editor and publisher (directeur).

== Academic career and affiliations ==
Casanova studied at Lycée Carnot de Tunis where he received his Baccalauréat in 1951 and Institut des Hautes Etudes (1951-54) in Tunis, then at the University of Paris and at Sciences Po where he received a PhD in economics in 1957 and where he also chaired the Conférence Olivaint, a students association. In 1957-58 he visited the Department of Economics at Harvard University. He then taught economics at Sciences Po (1958-59), where he was one of the first scholars at the Centre de Recherches et d'etudes Internationales (CERI) in 1958. In 1961-63 he served in the French Military as a junior officer. He then was an assistant professor at the Faculté de Droit et des Sciences économiques in Dijon (1963-64), and in 1964 became a tenured directeur d'études et de recherches at Sciences Po, a position he kept until 1990. He taught at École nationale d'administration (1966-68) and Paris Nanterre University (1968-69) before returning to Sciences Po as a University Professor until 2002.

He also taught at École Nationale Supérieure du Pétrole et des Moteurs between 1970 and 1976, and held visiting positions at University of Dakar, Harvard University, and Diplomatic Academy of Vienna.

From 2007 to 2016 he was the chairman (président) of the National Foundation for Political Science (FNSP), the administrative entity that manages Sciences Po, succeeding René Rémond and succeeded by Olivier Duhamel. A board member since 1971, he was the FNSP's first-ever economist chairman.

Casanova has been a cofounder and key participant of the Saint-Simon Foundation from 1982 to 1999, the chairman of the scientific council of the French Institute for Demographic Studies (INED) from 1996 to 2001, a member of the French Academy of Moral and Political Sciences since 1997 (and its chairman in 2009), and a board member of French Institute of International Relations (IFRI) since 2009.

== Politics and public policy ==
Casanova was involved in politics and public policy from early on, serving on the personal staff (cabinet ministériel) of Industry Minister Jean-Marcel Jeanneney between 1959 and 1961, and later in those of Education Minister Joseph Fontanet (1972-74) and Prime Minister Raymond Barre (1976-81). He advised the presidential election campaigns of Valéry Giscard d'Estaing in 1981, Raymond Barre in 1988, and François Bayrou in 2002.

He has taken part in numerous French policy advisory bodies. In particular, he has been a member of the French Economic and Social Council from 1994 to 2004 and of the Conseil d'analyse de la société from 2004 to 2008. He has also been a member of the Trilateral Commission since its creation in 1973.

== Media and publishing ==
In 1978 Casanova cofounded Commentaire with Raymond Aron, and since then has been its director, a position that covers the roles of both publisher and editor.

He has also been a columnist for L'Express (1985-95), Le Figaro (1996-2001), Le Monde (2001-11), and the local monthly Corsica.

A frequent commentator on France Culture public radio, he was the co-host of its program La Rumeur du monde together with Jean-Marie Colombani.

He has been the deputy editor of the Thémis economics series at the Presses Universitaires de France publishing house since 1986.

== Honors ==
Casanova is an officer of the Legion of Honour, officer of the National Order of Merit, and officier of the Ordre des Palmes académiques.

== Selected works ==
- Essai sur quelques tentatives d'intégration de l'économie et de la sociologie (PhD thesis), 1963
- La politique scientifique des États-Unis, 1968
- Principes d'analyse économique, 1969-1978
- Reshaping the international economic order (coauthor), 1972
- Rapport du groupe d'étude de la tarification de l'électricité (coauthor), 1974
- Histoire de l’analyse économique de Joseph Schumpeter (lead of French translation), 1983
- Mélanges offerts à Raymond Aron (editor), 1985
- Six manières d’être européens (coauthor), 1990
- Entre l'État et le marché. L'économie française de 1880 à nos jours, in Les Echanges extérieurs : un équilibre précaire (with Maurice Levy-Leboyer), 1991
- Réformer le mode de scrutin européen, 1996
- La Construction de l’Europe, 2004 (ISBN 2-84749-052-3)
