= Marianne Bastid-Bruguière =

French historian & academic

Marianne Bastid-Bruguière (French pronunciation: [maʁjan bastidbʁyɡjɛʁ]; born 13 November 1940) is a French sinologist. She is a graduate of the Ecole Nationale des Langues et Civilisations Orientales and Peking University. From 1969, she worked for the Centre National de la Recherche Scientifique. She has also taught at the Institut d'études politiques de Strasbourg, the École des hautes études en sciences sociales, Paris Diderot University, Harvard University, Seikei University, the University of London, and the University of Kyoto. She is a reader for The China Quarterly.

She is a member of the Académie des Sciences Morales et Politiques, the Society for Asian Studies, the Academia Europaea. From 1992 to 1996, she was President of the Association Européenne d'Etudes Chinoises. She has received honorary PhDs from the Russian Academy of Sciences and the University of Aberdeen. In April 2010, she was named Grand Officer of the Légion d'honneur.

== Bibliography ==
- La Chine 1: Des Guerres de l'Opium à la Guerre Franco-Chinoise, 1840-1885 (co-written with J. Chesneaux) (1965)
- Aspects de la Réforme de l'Enseignement en Chine au Début du XXe siècle (1971)
- La Chine 2: De la Guerre Franco-Chinoise à la Fondation du Parti Communiste Chinois, 1885-1921 (co-written with J. Chesneau and M.-C. Bergère) (1972)
- L'Evolution de la Société Chinoise à la Fin de la Dynastie des Qing, 1873-1911 (1979)
- The Cambridge History of China (co-author) (1980)
- The Scope of State Power in China (co-author) (1985)
- China's Education and the Industrialized world; Studies in Cultural Transfer (co-written with R. Hayhoe) (1987)
- Educational Reform in Early Twentieth-Century China (translated by P.J. Bailey) (1988)
