= Jean-Marc Daniel =

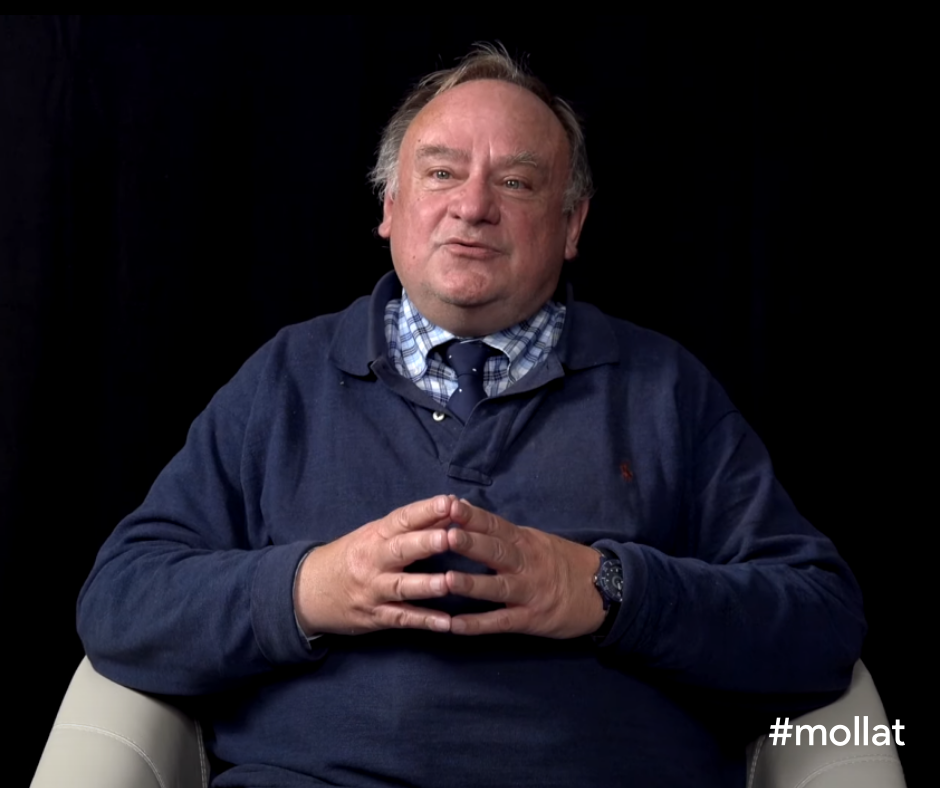
- Jean-Marc Daniel
- Born: 26 April 1954 (age 72); Bordeaux, France
- Education: École Polytechnique; ENSAE ParisTech
- Occupations: Economist, writer

Jean-Marc Daniel (born 26 April) is a French Economist, Professor at ESCP Business School and editorial Director of Societal magazine. He describes himself as a classic liberal.

He is a Columnist for the newspaper Le Monde (on the history of economic ideas) and on BFM Business. He is a member of the board of Directors of the Société d'économie politique and of the editorial committee for the l’Année des professions financières, a reference work in economy and finance, published each year by the Centre des professions financières.

== Selected bibliography ==
- La Politique économique, Que sais-je ?, éd. PUF, 2008 OCLC 244815174
- Histoire vivante de la pensée économique, des crises et des hommes, Pearson, 2010 ISBN 978-2-7440-7450-9
- Le Socialisme de l’excellence. Combattre les rentes et promouvoir les talents, Paris, François Bourin, 2011, 182 pages
- With Henri Sterdyniak, Présidence Sarkozy : quel bilan ?, Prométhée, 2012 OCLC 781828455
- Huit leçons d'histoire économique, Paris, Odile Jacob, 2012 ISBN 978-2-7381-2849-2 OCLC 819190002
- Ricardo reviens ! ils sont restés keynesiens, Broché, 2012
- L'État de connivence, Broché, 2014
- Le Gâchis français : histoire de quarante ans de mensonges économiques, Broché, 2015
- Valls, Macron : le socialisme de l'excellence à la française, Broché, 2016
- Les Impôts. Histoire d’une folie française. Soixante ans de matraquage fiscal, Taillandier, 2017 ISBN 979-10-210-2055-9
- Macron, la valse folle de Jupiter, L'Archipel, 2018
- With Cristina Peicuti, Decoding Economic Crises, World Scientific, London, 2023

== Awards ==
- Chevalier of the Légion d'honneur (2015)
- Zerilli-Marimò award (2019)
