= Le Débat =

French intellectual magazine (1980–2020)

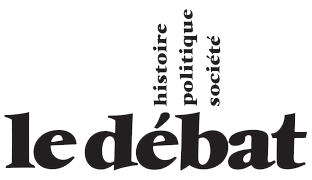
Logo

Le Débat was a bi-monthly French periodical that appeared from 1980 to 2020. Founded by Pierre Nora and Marcel Gauchet, and associated with French left-wing politics, it was characterised as the "single most influential intellectual periodical" of late-twentieth-century France.

The first issue of Le Débat appeared on the day of the funeral of Jean-Paul Sartre. As editor, Pierre Nora announced that the review would exemplify a new, post-partisan, role for French intellectuals: free from commitment to revolutionary politics, they would concentrate on the exercise of 'reflective judgement'. According to Nora, Le Débat sold between 8,000 and 15,000 copies per issue in the 1980s. Past editors include Raymond Aron, Georges Dumézil, François Jacob, Michel Foucault, Emmanuel Le Roy Ladurie, François Furet and Jacques Le Goff.

In 2020, Le Débat announced in its 40th anniversary issue that it would cease publication. According to Christopher Caldwell, the magazine had fallen into disrepute among younger left-wing intellectuals, who disparaged the French tradition of egalitarianism and rejected the criticism of U.S.-style identity politics represented in Le Débat as reactionary.
