= Pierre Manent =

French political scientist and academic (born 1949)

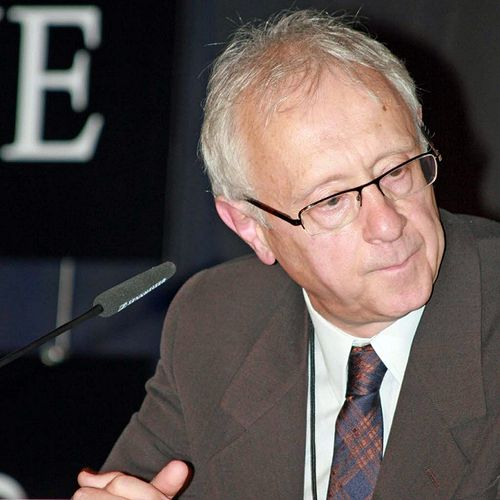
- Pierre Manent in November 2011
- Born: Pierre Manent; May 6, 1949 (age 77); Toulouse, France
- Education: École normale supérieure
- Scientific career
- Fields: Political science
- Workplaces: École des Hautes Études en Sciences Sociales; Boston College

Pierre Manent (French: [manɑ̃]; born 6 May 1949) is a French political scientist and academic. He teaches political philosophy at the École des Hautes Études en Sciences Sociales, in the Centre de recherches politiques Raymond Aron. Every autumn, he is also a visiting teacher in Boston College at the Department of Political Science.

After graduating from the École normale supérieure, he became assistant to Raymond Aron at the Collège de France. He was one of the founders of the quarterly Commentaire and remains a regular contributor.

Manent is a key figure in contemporary French political philosophy and his work has helped the rediscovery of the French liberal tradition. A eurosceptic and a classical liberal, he has been called by The Weekly Standard "the most profound of the Euroskeptical philosophers".

== Bibliography ==
=== In French ===
- Naissances de la politique moderne: Machiavel, Hobbes, Rousseau (Payot, 1997, reed., Gallimard, 2007)
- Tocqueville et la nature de la démocratie (1982, reed. 1993)
- Les Libéraux (1986, reed. Gallimard, 2001)
- Histoire intellectuelle du libéralisme: dix leçons (1987, reed. 1997)
- La Cité de l'homme (1994, reed. Flammarion, 1997)
- Cours familier de philosophie politique (Fayard, 2001, reed Gallimard 2004)
- L'Amour et l'amitié d'Allan Bloom (traduction) (Livre de Poche, 2003)
- Une éducation sans autorité ni sanction ? (with Alain Renaut et Albert Jacquard, Grasset, 2004)
- La raison des nations (Gallimard, 2006)
- Ce que peut la littérature (with Alain Finkielkraut, Mona Ozouf et Suzanne Julliard, Stock, coll. « Les Essais », 2006, 295 p., ISBN 2234059143)
- Enquête sur la démocratie : Etudes de philosophie politique (Gallimard, 2007)

=== In English ===
- Natural Law and Human Rights: Toward a Recovery of Practical Reason Ralph C. Hancock, trans., (Notre Dame, Indiana: University of Notre Dame Press, 2020).
- Metamorphoses of the City: On the Western Dynamic Marc A. Lepain, trans., (Cambridge, Massachusetts: Harvard University Press, 2013).
- Democracy Without Nations: The Fate of Self-Government in Europe Paul Seaton, trans., (Wilmington, Delaware: Intercollegiate Studies Instituts, 2007).
- A World beyond Politics? Marc A. Lepain, trans., (Princeton, New Jersey: Princeton University Press, 2006).
- Modern Liberty and its Discontents. Daniel J. Mahoney and Paul Seaton, trans., (Lanham, Maryland: Rowman & Littlefield Publishers, 1998).
- The City of Man. Marc A. LePain, trans., (Princeton, New Jersey: Princeton University Press, 1998).
- Tocqueville and the Nature of Democracy. John Waggoner, trans., (Lanham, Maryland: Rowman & Littlefield, 1996).
- An Intellectual History of Liberalism. Rebecca Balinski, trans., (Princeton, New Jersey: Princeton University Press, 1994).
- Montaigne: Life without Law. Paul Seaton, trans., (Notre Dame, Indiana: University of Notre Dame Press, 2020).
