= Vincent Descombes =

French philosopher (born 1943)

- Born: 1943 (age 82–83)

Education
- Education: University of Paris

Philosophical work
- Era: Contemporary philosophy
- Region: Western philosophy
- School: Continental philosophy Libertarian socialism
- Institutions: École des hautes études en sciences sociales
- Main interests: Philosophy of mind
- Notable ideas: Post-Kojèvian discourse

Vincent Descombes (French: [dekɔ̃b]; born 1943) is a French philosopher whose major work is in philosophy of language and philosophy of mind.

== Philosophical work ==
Descombes is particularly noted for a lengthy critique in two volumes of the project he calls cognitivism, and which is, roughly, the view current in philosophy of mind that mental and psychological facts can ultimately be treated as, or reduced to, physical facts about the brain.

Descombes has also written an introduction to modern French philosophy (Le même et l'autre) focused on the transition, after 1960, from a focus on the three H's, Georg Wilhelm Friedrich Hegel, Edmund Husserl and Martin Heidegger to the "three masters of suspicion", Karl Marx, Friedrich Nietzsche and Sigmund Freud. In the same book, he introduced the term "post-Kojèvian discourse" to designate the period of French philosophy after the 1930s (from 1933 to 1939, Alexandre Kojève delivered in Paris a series of lectures on Hegel's work The Phenomenology of Spirit that had an immense influence on 20th-century French philosophy).

Descombes teaches at the Centre de recherches politiques Raymond Aron, part of the École des hautes études en sciences sociales. He holds an appointment in the Committee on Social Thought at the University of Chicago.

Descombes was a member of the French libertarian socialist group Socialisme ou Barbarie.

== Works ==
- Le platonisme, 1970
- L'inconscient malgré lui, 1977
- Le même et l'autre. Quarante-cinq ans de philosophie française (1933–1978), Editions de Minuit, 1979. Trans. Modern French Philosophy, Cambridge University Press, 1980. ISBN 0-521-29672-2.
- Grammaire d'objets en tous genres, 1983. Trans. Objects of All Sorts: A Philosophical Grammar, Johns Hopkins University Press, 1986. ISBN 0-8018-2551-2.
- Proust: Philosophie du roman, Editions de Minuit, 1987. Trans. Proust: Philosophy of the Novel, Stanford University Press, 1992. ISBN 0-8047-2000-2
- Philosophie par gros temps, 1989 Trans. The Barometer of Modern Reason: On the Philosophies of Current Events, Oxford University Press, 1993. ISBN 0-19-506681-2.
- La denrée mentale, 1995. Trans. The Mind's Provisions: A Critique of Cognitivism, Princeton University Press, 2001. ISBN 0-691-00131-6.
- Les institutions du sens, 1996. Trans. The Institutions of Meaning: A Defense of Anthropological Holism, Harvard University Press, 2014. ISBN 0-674-72878-5.
- Le complément de sujet, 2004
- Le raisonnement de l'ours, et d'autres essais de philosophie pratique, 2007
- Les embarras de l'identité, 2013. Trans. Puzzling Identities, Harvard University Press, 2016. ISBN 978-0-674-73214-8.
- Exercices d'humanité, 2013
- Le parler de soi, 2014
