= Patrice Gueniffey =

French historian (born 1955)

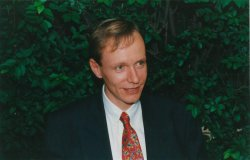
Image of Patrice Gueniffey

Patrice Gueniffey (born 1955) is a French historian. He is a specialist in Napoleonic studies and the French Revolution, and a full professor at the School for Advanced Studies in the Social Sciences.

== Biography ==
Gueniffey obtained his PhD in history in 1989 with a thesis on suffrage during the French Revolution, and was hired at the École des hautes études en sciences sociales (EHSS), where he has been a full professor since 2001. From 2006 to 2008, he directed the Centre de recherches politiques Raymond Aron, founded by François Furet, of whom Gueniffey was a disciple.

Gueniffey collaborated on the Critical Dictionary of the French Revolution, directed by Furet and Mona Ozouf in 1988. He published monographs dedicated to elections in the revolutionary period and to the Reign of Terror. Moving into the Napoleonic era, he edited the critical re-editions of Jacques Bainville's biography of Napoleon and the Napoleonic memoirs of Jean-Antoine Chaptal, and published a monograph dedicated to the Coup of 18 Brumaire. In 2013, he published Bonaparte, the first of a two-volume work on Napoleon, also published in English, which received acclaim from critics.

Gueniffey, writing in Le Point magazine, criticized the 2023 film Napoleon as rewriting history in a "very anti-French and very pro-British" manner.

== Awards and honors ==
In 2013, Gueniffey was awarded the Grand prix de la biographie politique for Bonaparte which included 10,000 euros in prize money. That same year, he received the Grand Prix from the Fondation Napoléon for Bonaparte. In 2014, he was awarded the Grand prix Gobert. In 2017, he was awarded the Prix Montaigne de Bordeaux.

== Publications ==
=== Monographs ===
- Patrice Gueniffey; François Furet (1993). Le Nombre et la Raison: la Révolution française et les élections. Recherches d'histoire et de sciences sociales (in French). Paris: Éditions de l'École des hautes études en sciences sociales. p. 559. ISBN 2-7132-1007-0., compte rendu de Melvin Edelstein; rééd. Cerf, 2020
- La Politique de la Terreur: essai sur la violence révolutionnaire (1789–1794) (in French). Paris: Fayard 2000, réédition Gallimard, coll. « Tel », numéro 323. 2003. p. 376. ISBN 2-213-60575-0. 2-07-076727-2., compte rendu de lecture de Claude Mazauric
- Le Dix-huit brumaire (9 novembre 1799): L'épilogue de la Révolution française. Les journées qui ont fait la France. Paris: Gallimard. 2008. p. 422. ISBN 978-2-07-211397-0.
- Histoires de la Révolution et de l'Empire. Tempus (in French). Paris: Perrin. 2011. p. 744. ISBN 978-2-262-03333-0.
- Bonaparte (1769-1802). Paris: Gallimard. 2013. p. 1120. ISBN 978-2-07-268425-8.
- Napoléon et de Gaulle. Deux héros français (in French). Paris: Perrin. 2017. p. 413. ISBN 978-2-262-06486-0..
