= Benoît Pellistrandi =

French historian

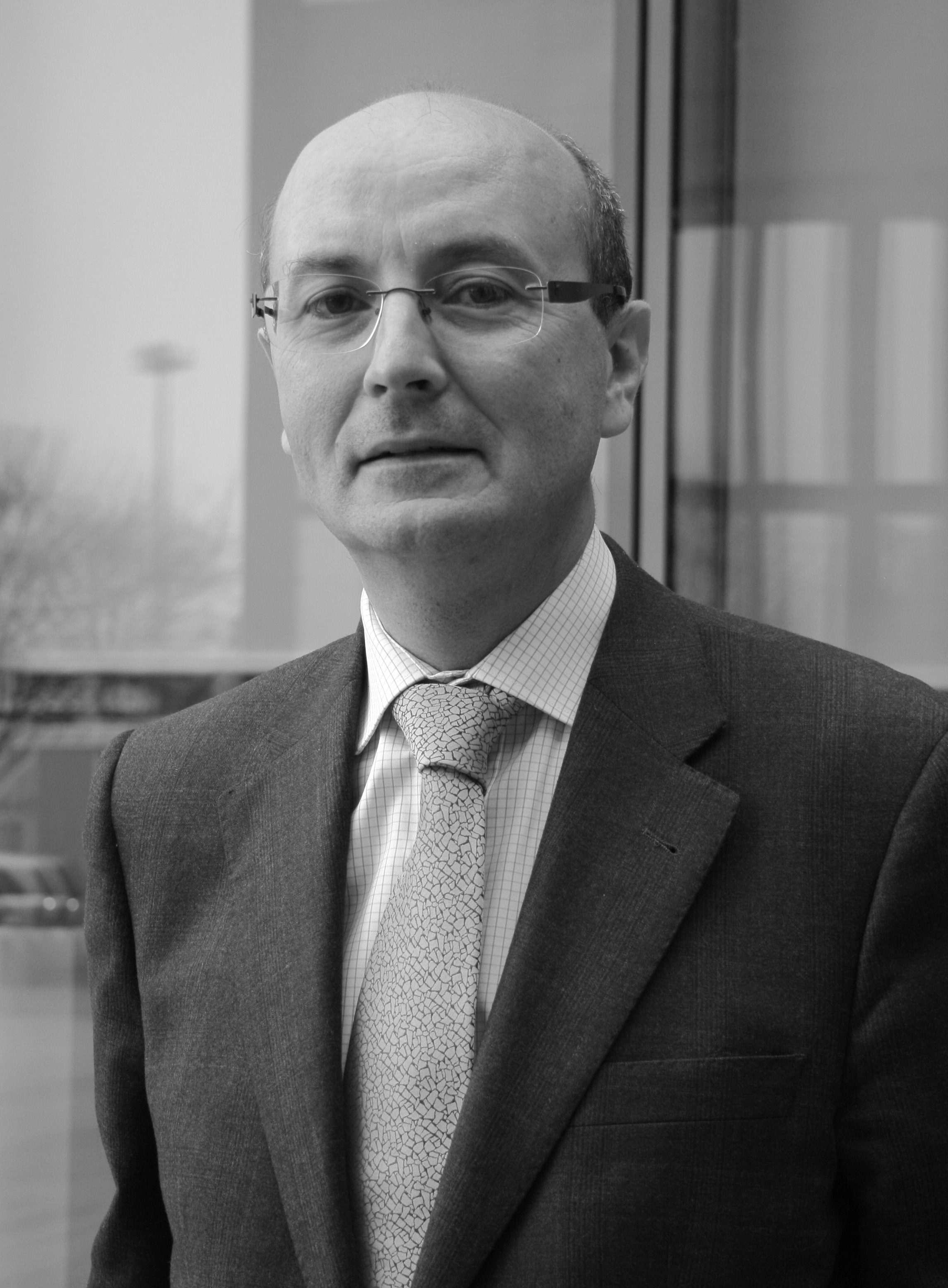
- Pellistrandi in 2012
- Born: 1966; Paris
- Education: doctorate in France
- Alma mater: School for Advanced Studies in the Social Sciences
- Employer: Casa de Velázquez; Catholic University of Paris; Lycée Condorcet

Benoît Pellistrandi (born 1966) is a French historian and hispanist.

== Biography ==
Born in 1966 in Paris. A student at the École normale supérieure, he earned a PhD in history. He served as Director of Studies of the Casa de Velázquez from 1997 to 2005. He was worked as lecturer at the Institut Catholique de Paris (ICP) and as teacher for classes préparatoires at the Lycée Condorcet.

He has been a corresponding member of the Royal Academy of History since 2013.

== Works ==
Author

- — (2004). Un discours national? La Real Academia de la Historia entre science et politique (1847-1897). Madrid: Casa de Velázquez.
- — (2013). Histoire de l'Espagne. Des guerres napoléoniennes à nos jours. Paris: Perrin.
- — (2019). Le Labyrinthe catalan. Paris: Desclée de Brouwer.

Editor/Coordinator

- Pellistrandi, Benoît, ed. (2002). La historiografía francesa del siglo XX y su acogida en España. Madrid: Casa de Velázquez.
- Pellistrandi, Benoît, ed. (2004). L'Histoire religieuse en France et en Espagne, Colloque international (Casa de Velázquez, 2-5 avril 2001). Madrid: Casa de Velázquez.
- Pellistrandi, Benoît; Sirinelli, Jean-François, eds. (2008). L'histoire culturelle en France et en Espagne. Madrid: Casa de Velázquez.
