= Académie des Sciences Morales et Politiques =

French learned society

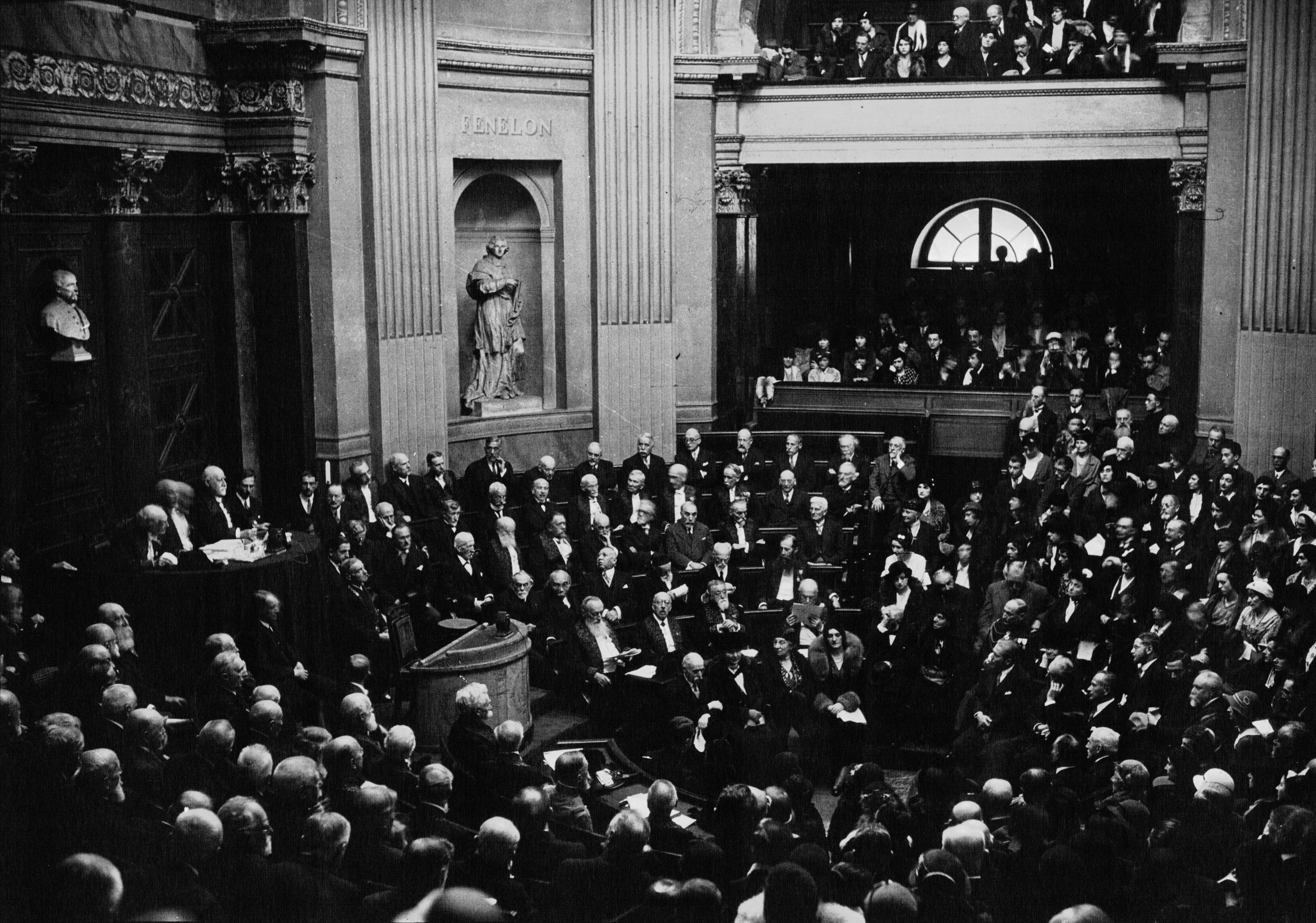
President Léon Brunschvicg (on the left) addressing the assembly on the occasion of the centenary of the re-establishment of the Académie des Sciences Morales et Politiques at the Institut de France in 1932.

The Académie des Sciences Morales et Politiques (French pronunciation: [akademi de sjɑ̃s mɔʁal e pɔlitik]; "Academy of Moral and Political Sciences") is a French learned society. It is one of the five academies of the Institut de France.

== Organisation ==
The members of the Académie are elected by peers. It is made of 50 members in 6 different sections depending on their specialisations:

1. Philosophy
2. Morals and Sociology
3. Law
4. Political economics, statistics and finances
5. History and geography
6. General section, formerly called membres libres (free members)

== History ==
The Académie was founded in 1795, suppressed in 1803, and reestablished in 1832 through the appeal of Guizot to King Louis Philippe. It is divided into five sections and has for its chief purpose the discussion of mental philosophy, law and jurisprudence, political economy and statistics, general and philosophical history, and politics, administration, and finance. It distributes the Baujour, Faucher, Bonnefous, Halphen, Bordin, and other prizes, publishes Mémoires, and holds its annual meeting each December.

== Role and missions ==
Being under the protection of the president of the Republic, the Academy, a distinctive legal entity with particular status, promotes regular meetings and debates devoted towards fundamental or unanswered topics. In the last years, some of the themes were:

- State and religion (1994)
- The role of the State in the beginning of the 21st century (2000)
- Man and his Planet (2004)
- Cross-looks on Europe (2004)
- Is France sick of its Justice? (2006)

== List of current members ==
- Gérald Antoine
- Bernard Arnault
- Jean Bæchler
- Marianne Bastid-Bruguière
- Pierre Bauchet
- Alain Besançon
- Jacques Boré
- Bernard Bourgeois
- Gabriel de Broglie
- Jean-Claude Casanova
- Chantal Delsol
- Renaud Denoix de Saint Marc
- François d'Orcival
- Roland Drago
- Jacques Dupâquier
- Yvon Gattaz
- Shlomo ha-Levi
- Lucien Israël
- Jacques de Larosière
- Jean Mesnard
- Thierry de Montbrial
- Alain Plantey
- Bertrand Saint-Sernin
- François Terré
- Claudine Tiercelin
- Jean Tulard

== List of foreign associate members ==
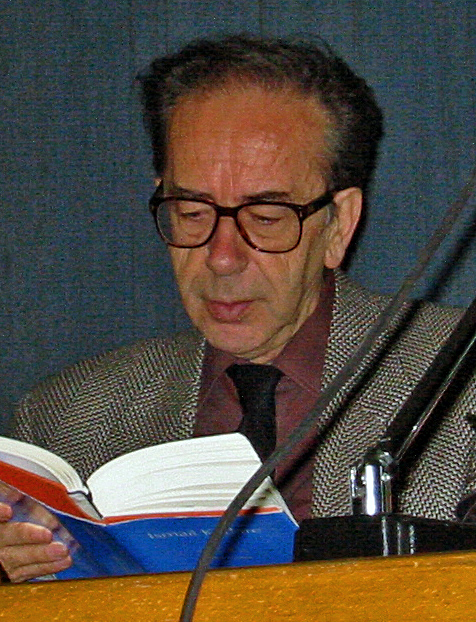
Ismail Kadare

- Charles III of the United Kingdom
- Prince Hassan of Jordan
- Juan Carlos I of Spain
- Dora Bakoyannis
- Stephen Breyer
- Jean-Claude Juncker
- Ismail Kadare
- Mario Monti
- Tomáš Masaryk
- Edvard Beneš
- Javier Pérez de Cuéllar
- Patriarch Bartholomew
