= Alain Besançon =

French historian (1932–2023)

- Born: 25 April 1932; Paris, France
- Died: 9 July 2023 (aged 91)
- Occupation: Historian
- Awards: Member of the Académie des sciences morales et politiques, 1996

Academic work
- Discipline: History
- Sub-discipline: History of Russia; intellectual history
- Institutions: École des hautes études en sciences sociales, Paris

Alain Besançon (French pronunciation: [alɛ̃ bəzɑ̃sɔ̃]; 25 April 1932 – 9 July 2023) was a French historian. He specialised in intellectual history and Russian politics. From 1965 to 1992 he was director of studies at the École des hautes études en sciences sociales in Paris. He was elected to the Académie des sciences morales et politiques of the Institut de France in 1996.

His book L'Image interdite, une histoire intellectuelle de l'iconoclasme (1994) was translated into English as The Forbidden Image: An Intellectual History of Iconoclasm in 2000 and published by the University of Chicago Press.

Besançon died on 9 July 2023, at the age of 91.

== Publications ==
- Le Tsarévitch immolé, 1967.
- Histoire et expérience du moi, 1971.
- Entretiens sur le Grand Siècle russe et ses prolongements (co-author), 1971.
- Éducation et société en Russie, 1974.
- L'Histoire psychanalytique, une anthologie, 1974.
- Être russe au XIXème siècle, 1974.
- Court traité de soviétologie à l'usage des autorités civiles, militaires et religieuses, 1976 (preface by Raymond Aron).
- Les Origines intellectuelles du léninisme, Calmann-Lévy, 1977.
- La Confusion des langues, 1978.
- Présent soviétique et passé russe, Livre de poche, Paris, 1980 (réédité : Hachette, Paris, 1986).
- Anatomie d'un spectre: l'économie politique du socialisme réel, Calmann-Lévy, Paris, 1981.
- Courrier Paris-Stanford (co-author), 1984.
- La Falsification du bien, Soloviev et Orwell, 1985.
- Une génération, Julliard, 1987.
- Vendredis, 1989.
- L'Image interdite, une histoire intellectuelle de l'iconoclasme, 1994.
- Trois tentations dans l'Église, 1996.
- Aux sources de l’iconoclasme moderne, 1998.
- Le Malheur du siècle : sur le communisme, le nazisme et l'unicité de la Shoah, Fayard, 1998, 166 p.
- Émile et les menteurs, 2008.
- Cinq Personnages en quête d'amour. Amour et religion, 2010.
- Sainte Russie, 2012.
- Le Protestantisme américain. De Calvin à Billy Graham, 2013.
- Problèmes religieux contemporains, 2015.
