= Van Praet =

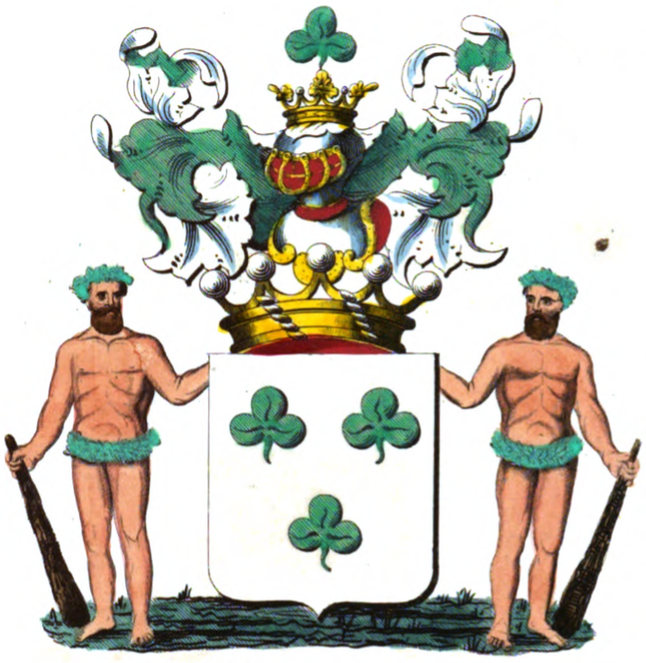
Coat of Arms of the Van Part Family

Van Praet is a surname. Notable people with the surname include:

- Joseph Van Praet (1754–1837), French librarian
- Jules Van Praet (1806–1887), Belgian diplomat
- Louis of Praet (1488–1555), Dutch diplomat and politician

== See also ==
- Adolfo Van Praet, village in La Pampa Province, Argentina
- Praet, list of people with the surname Praet
- van Praet d'Amerloo, Belgian noble family dating back to the XII century
