= Naudet =

Naudet is a French surname. Notable people with the surname include:

- Françoise Naudet (1928–2008), French sculptor
- Jean-Jacques Naudet (1945–2026), French photographer
- Joseph Naudet (1786–1878), French historian
- Jules and Gédéon Naudet, French filmmakers
- Leopoldina Naudet (1773–1834), Italian Roman Catholic religious sister of French and Austrian descent
- Paul Naudet (1859–1929), French Catholic priest and author
- Pierre Naudet (1922–1997), French politician
- Thomas Charles Naudet (1773–1810), French artist/historical artist
