= Bibliothèque nationale de France =

National library of France in Paris

Coordinates: 48°50′01″N 2°22′33″E

National Library of France
- Bibliothèque nationale de France

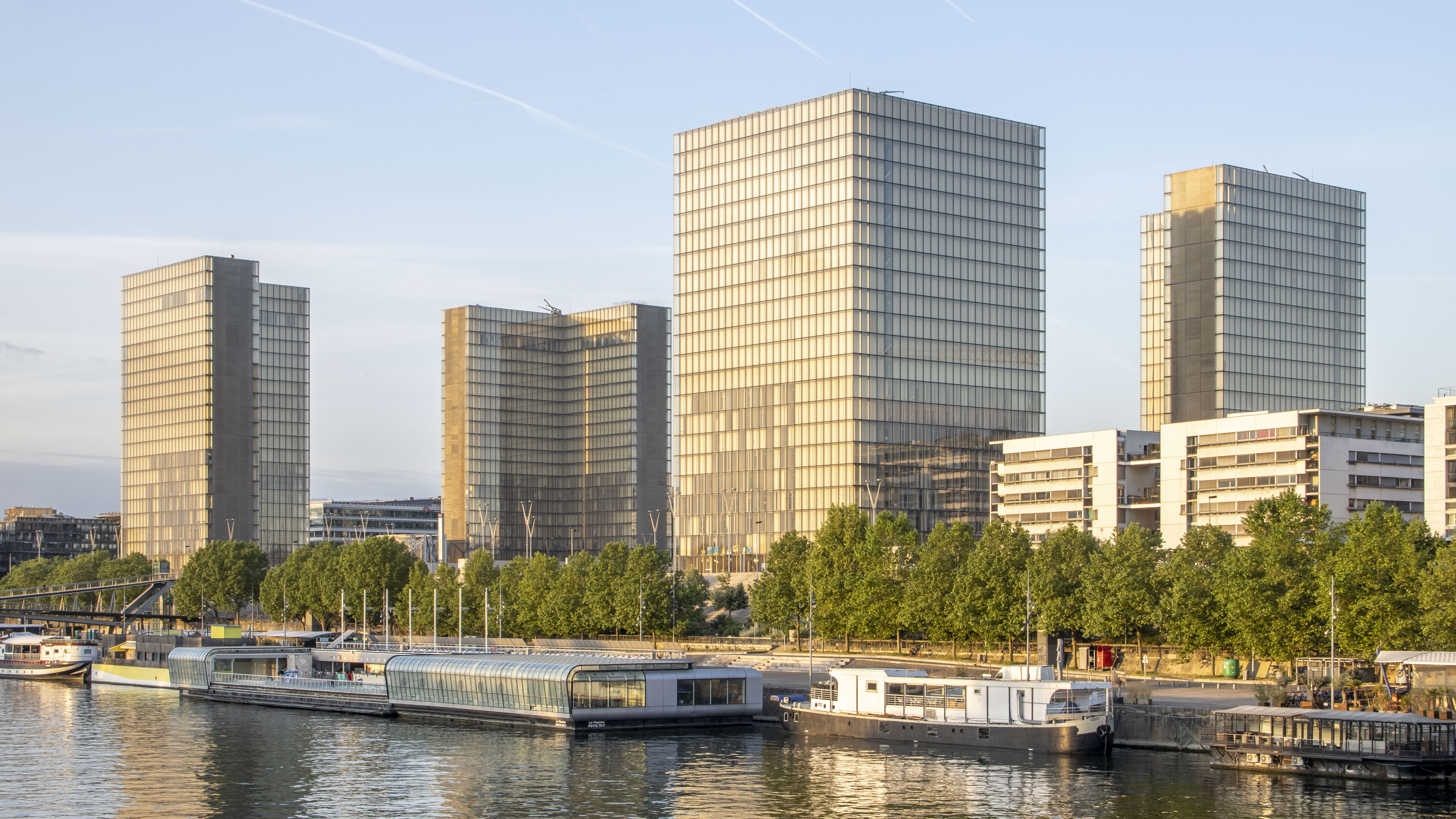
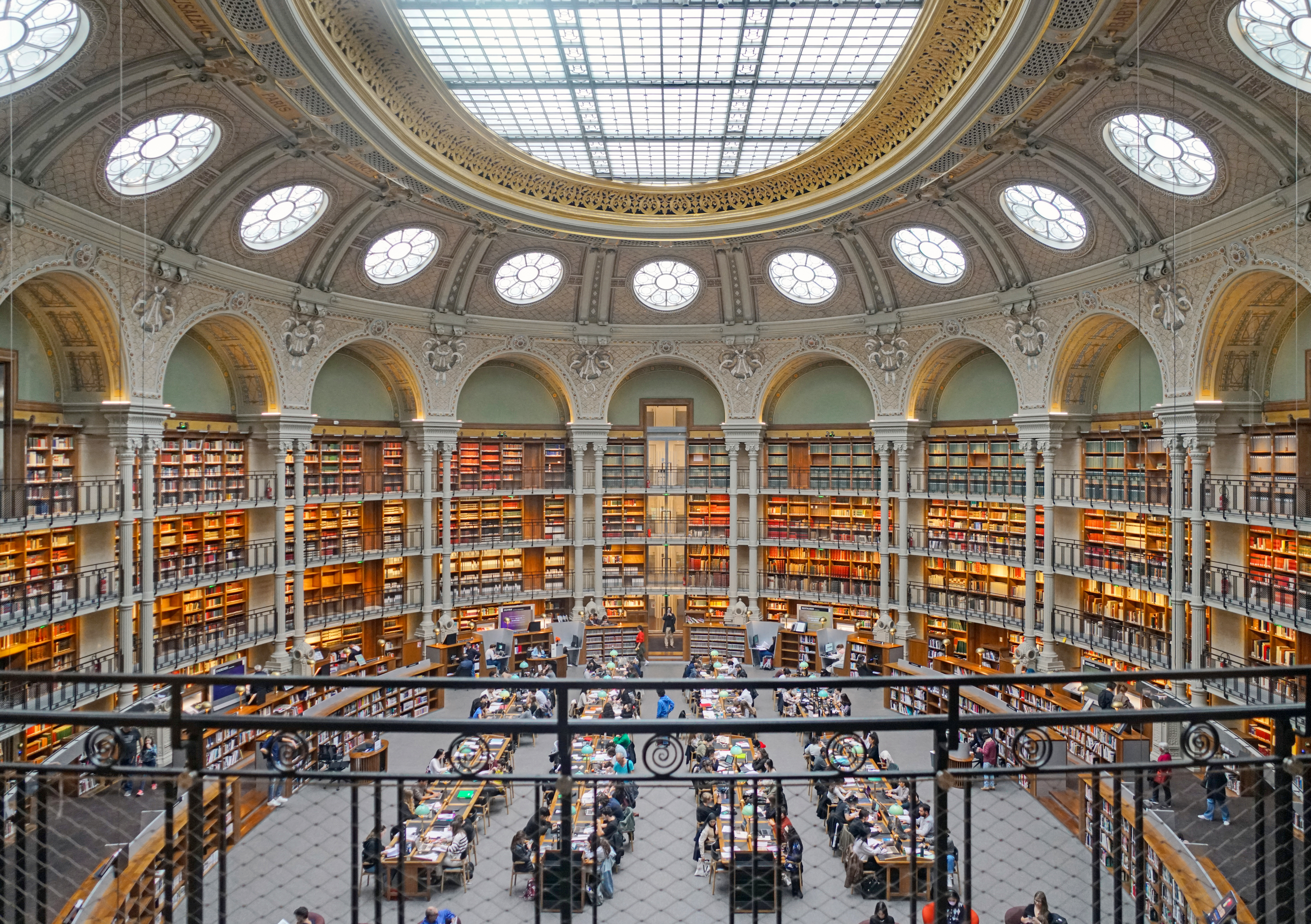
- Location: Paris, France
- Established: 1461; 565 years ago

Collection
- Items collected: Books, journals, newspapers, magazines, sound and music recordings, patents, databases, maps, stamps, prints, drawings and manuscripts
- Size: 42M items including 16M books, 410,000 journals, 950,000 maps, 2M music sheets. 48B web archives equivalent to 1,800 terabytes

Access and use
- Access requirements: Open to anyone with a need to use the collections and services

Other information
- Budget: €254 million
- Director: Gilles Pécout
- Employees: 2,300
- Website: bnf.fr (in French) (Automated Accessibility Score = 7.6 decimal)

The Bibliothèque nationale de France (French: [biblijɔtɛk nɑsjɔnal də fʁɑ̃s]; (Note: lit. 'National Library of France') BnF) is the national library of France, located in Paris on two main sites, Richelieu and François-Mitterrand. It is the national repository of all that is published in France. Some of its extensive collections, including books and manuscripts but also precious objects and artworks, are on display at the BnF Museum (formerly known as the Cabinet des Médailles) on the Richelieu site.

The National Library of France is a public establishment under the supervision of the Ministry of Culture. Its mission is to constitute collections, especially the copies of works published in France that must, by law, be deposited there, conserve them, and make them available to the public. It produces a reference catalogue, cooperates with other national and international establishments, as well as participates in research programs.

== History ==
The National Library of France traces its origin to the royal library founded at the Louvre Palace by Charles V in 1368. Charles had received a collection of manuscripts from his predecessor, John II, and transferred them to the Louvre from the Palais de la Cité. The first librarian of record was Claude Mallet, the king's valet de chambre, who made a sort of catalogue, Inventoire des Livres du Roy nostre Seigneur estans au Chastel du Louvre. Jean Blanchet made another list in 1380 and Jean de Bégue one in 1411 and another in 1424. Charles V was a patron of learning and encouraged the making and collection of books. It is known that he employed Nicholas Oresme, Raoul de Presles, and others to transcribe ancient texts. At the death of Charles VI, this first collection was unilaterally bought by the English regent of France, the Duke of Bedford, who transferred it to England in 1424. It was apparently dispersed at his death in 1435.

Charles VII did little to repair the loss of these books, but the invention of printing resulted in the starting of another collection in the Louvre inherited by Louis XI in 1461. Charles VIII seized a part of the collection of the kings of Aragon. Louis XII, who had inherited the library at Blois, incorporated the latter into the Bibliothèque du Roi and further enriched it with the Gruthuyse collection and with plunder from Milan. Francis I transferred the collection in 1534 to Fontainebleau and merged it with his private library. During his reign, fine bindings became the craze and many of the books added by him and Henry II are masterpieces of the binder's art.

Under the librarianship of Jacques Amyot, the collection was transferred to Paris and then relocated several times, during which many treasures were lost. Henry IV had it moved to the Collège de Clermont in 1595, a year after the expulsion of the Jesuits from their establishment. In 1604, the Jesuits were allowed to return and the collection was moved to the Cordeliers Convent, then, in 1622, to the nearby Confrérie de Saint-Côme et de Saint-Damien on the rue de la Harpe. The appointment of Jacques Auguste de Thou as librarian initiated a period of development that made it the largest and richest collection of books in the world. He was succeeded by his son who was replaced when executed for treason by Jérôme Bignon, the first of a line of librarians of the same name. Under de Thou, the library was enriched by the collections of Queen Catherine de Medici. The library grew rapidly during the reigns of Louis XIII and Louis XIV, due in great part to the interest of Minister Jean-Baptiste Colbert, himself a avid collector of books.

The site in the Rue de la Harpe becoming inadequate, the library was again moved, in 1666, to two adjacent houses in Rue Vivienne. After Colbert, Louis XIV's minister Louvois also took interest in the library and employed Jean Mabillon, Melchisédech Thévenot, and others to procure books from every source. In 1688, a catalogue in eight volumes was compiled. Louvois considered the erection of an opulent building to host it on what would become the Place Vendôme, a project that was however left unexecuted following the minister's death in 1691.

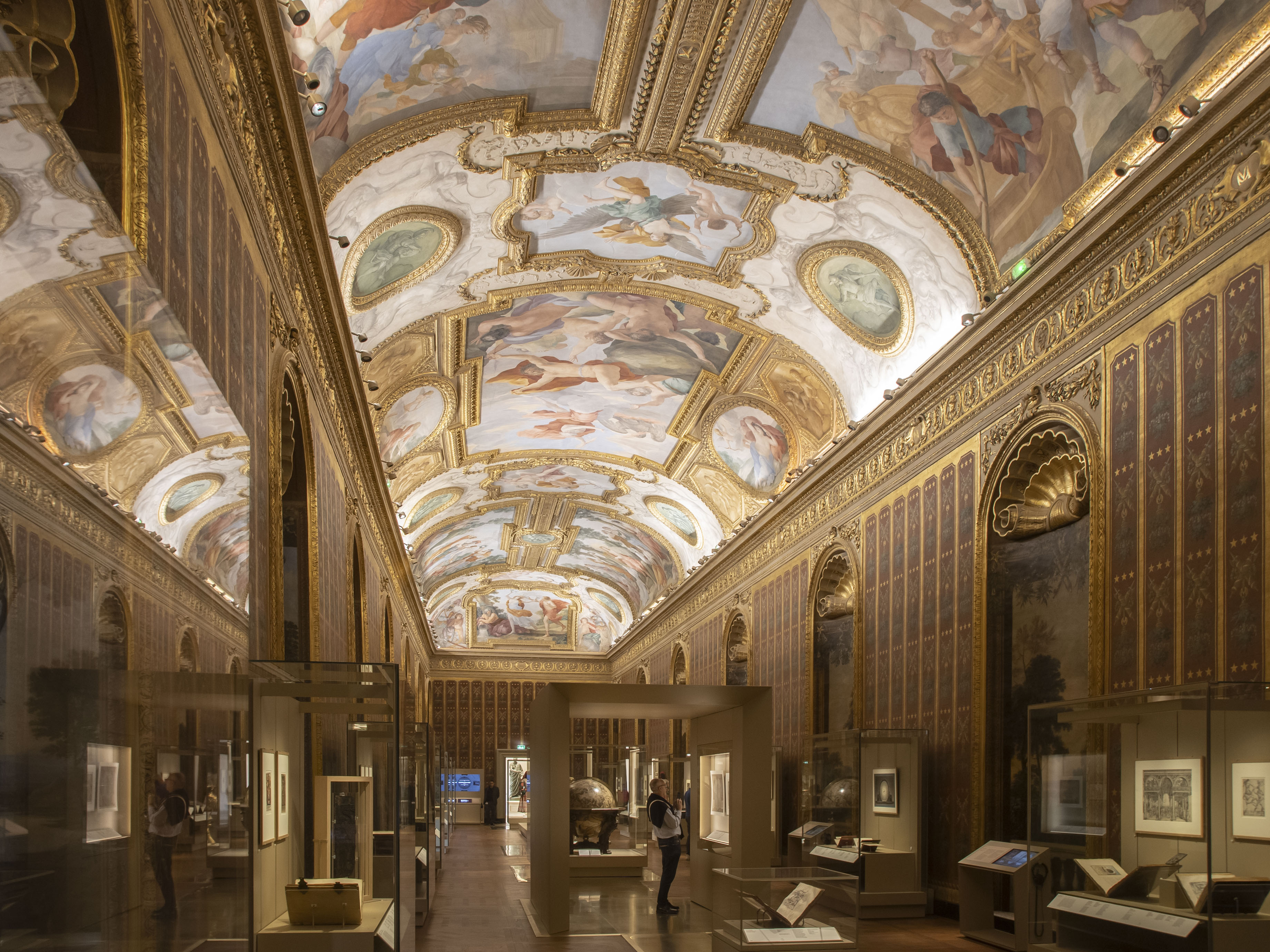
Galerie Mazarin, Richelieu site

The library opened to the public in 1692, under the administration of Abbott Camille le Tellier de Louvois, the minister's son. The Abbé Louvois was succeeded by Jean-Paul Bignon, who in 1721 seized the opportunity of the collapse of John Law's Mississippi Company. The company had been relocated by Law into the former palace of Cardinal Mazarin around Hôtel Tubeuf, and its failure freed significant space in which the Library would expand (even though the Hotel Tubeuf itself would remain occupied by French East India Company and later by France's financial bureaucracy until the 1820s). Bignon also instituted a complete reform of the library's system. Catalogues were made which appeared from 1739 to 1753 in 11 volumes. The collections increased steadily by purchase and gift to the outbreak of the French Revolution, at which time it was in grave danger of partial or total destruction, but owing to the activities of Antoine-Augustin Renouard and Joseph Van Praet it suffered no injury. After the Seven Years' War (1756–1763), the French government sent historian Louis-Georges de Bréquigny to England, where he copied about 70,000 medieval documents relating to French regions once ruled by England; these were later bound into 109 volumes now held in the National Library of France.

The library's collections swelled to over 300,000 volumes during the radical phase of the French Revolution when the private libraries of aristocrats and clergy were seized. After the establishment of the French First Republic in September 1792, "the Assembly declared the Bibliothèque du Roi to be national property and the institution was renamed the Bibliothèque Nationale. After four centuries of control by the Crown, this great library now became the property of the French people."

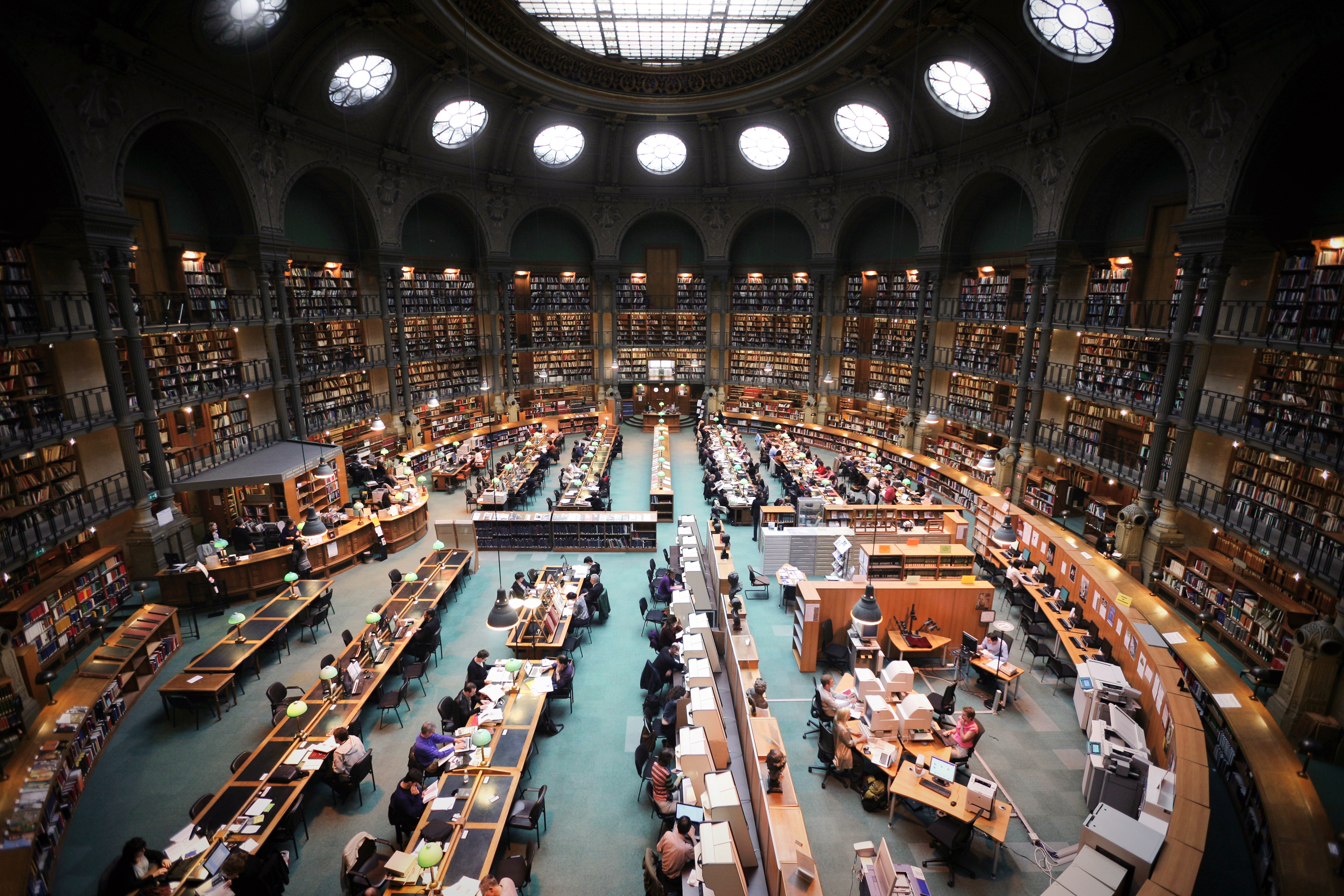
Salle ovale before restoration, Richelieu site

A new administrative organization was established. Napoleon took great interest in the library and among other things issued an order that all books in provincial libraries not possessed by the Bibliothèque Nationale should be forwarded to it, subject to replacement by exchanges of equal value from the duplicate collections, making it possible, as Napoleon said, to find a copy of any book in France in the National Library. Napoleon furthermore increased the collections by spoil from his conquests. A considerable number of these books were restored after his downfall. During the period from 1800 to 1836, the library was virtually under the control of Joseph Van Praet. At his death it contained more than 650,000 printed books and some 80,000 manuscripts.

Following a series of regime changes in France, it became the Imperial National Library and in 1868 was moved to newly constructed buildings on the Rue de Richelieu designed by Henri Labrouste. Upon Labrouste's death in 1875 the library was further expanded, including the grand staircase and the Oval Room, by academic architect Jean-Louis Pascal. In 1896, the library was still the largest repository of books in the world, although it has since been surpassed by other libraries for that title. By 1920, the library's collection had grown to 4,050,000 volumes and 11,000 manuscripts.

In 2024, the library removed four 19th-century books from its public access, namely two volumes of The Ballads of Ireland published in 1855, a bilingual anthology of Romanian poetry dating from 1856, and book of the Royal Horticultural Society published between 1862 and 1863, after tests indicated that their covers and bindings were coloured using green pigments containing arsenic.

== Richelieu site ==
The Richelieu site occupies a full city block in Paris, surrounded by rue de Richelieu (west), rue des Petits-Champs (south), rue Vivienne (east), and rue Colbert (north). There are two entrances, respectively on 58, rue de Richelieu and 5, rue Vivienne. This site was the main location of the library for 275 years, from 1721 to 1996. It now hosts the BnF Museum as well as facilities of the BnF, the library of the Institut National d'Histoire de l'Art (in the Saller Labrouste since 2016), and the library of the École Nationale des Chartes. It was comprehensively renovated in the 2010s and early 2020s on a design by architects Bruno Gaudin and Virginie Brégal.

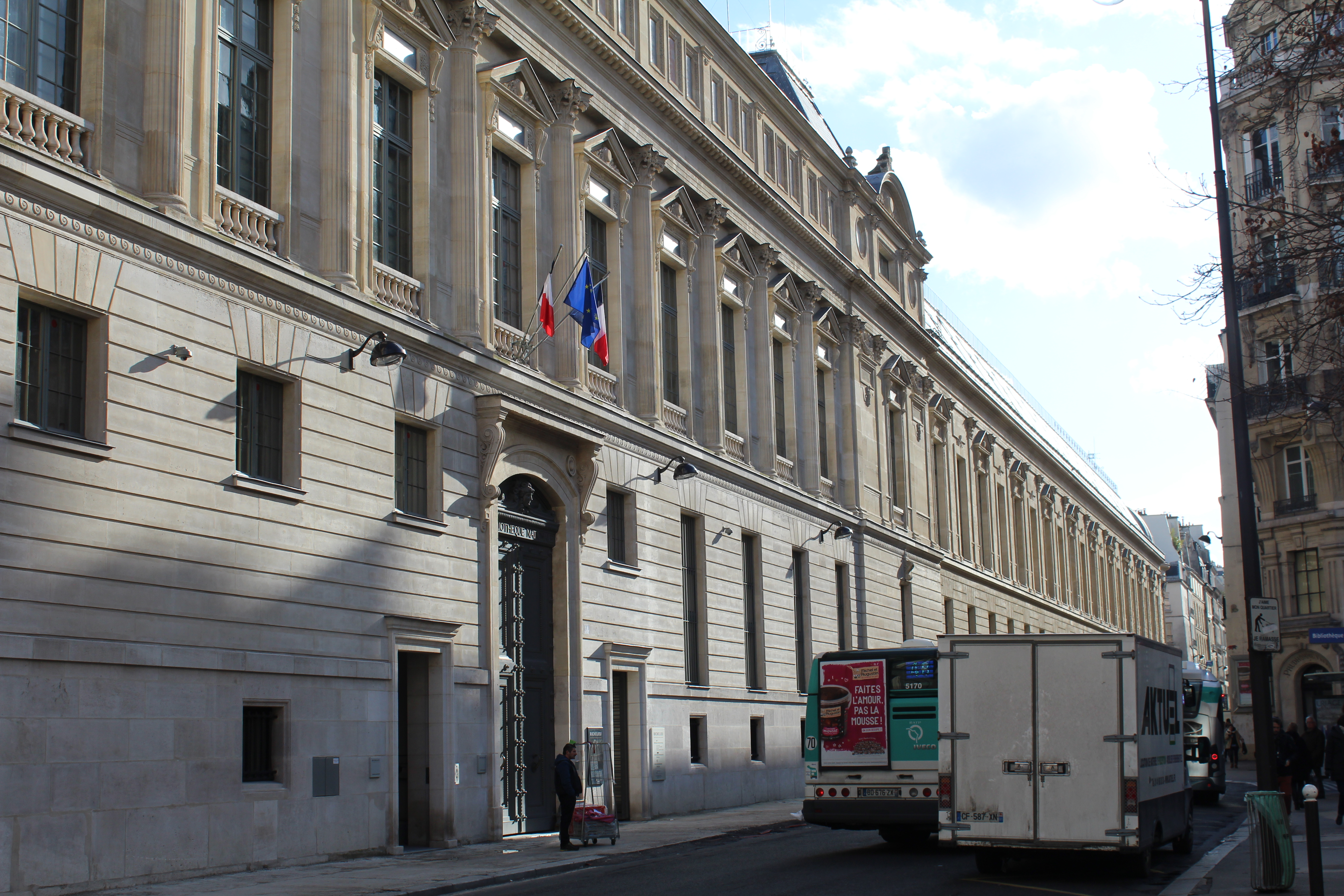
Façade on rue de Richelieu

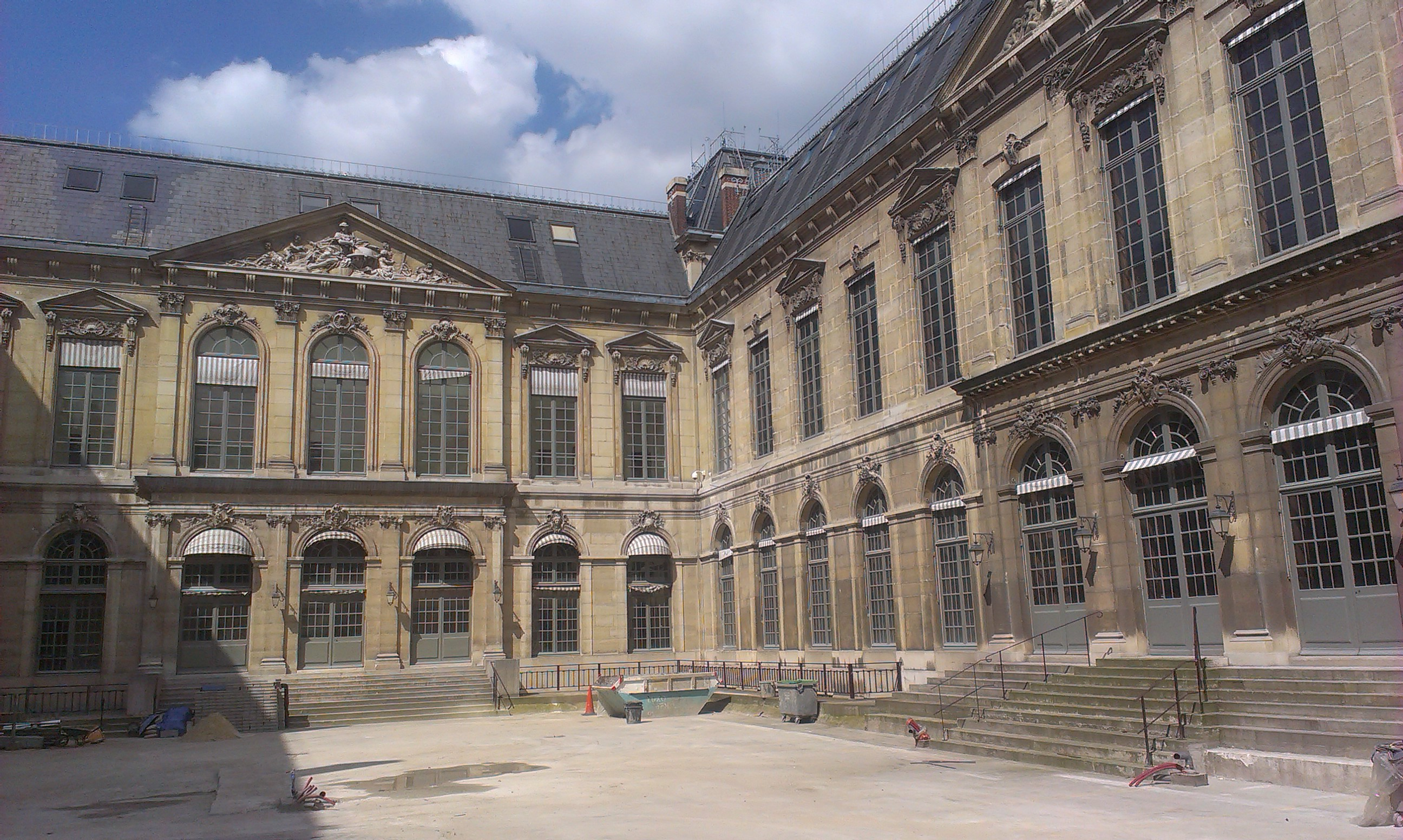
Main courtyard (Cour d'honneur)

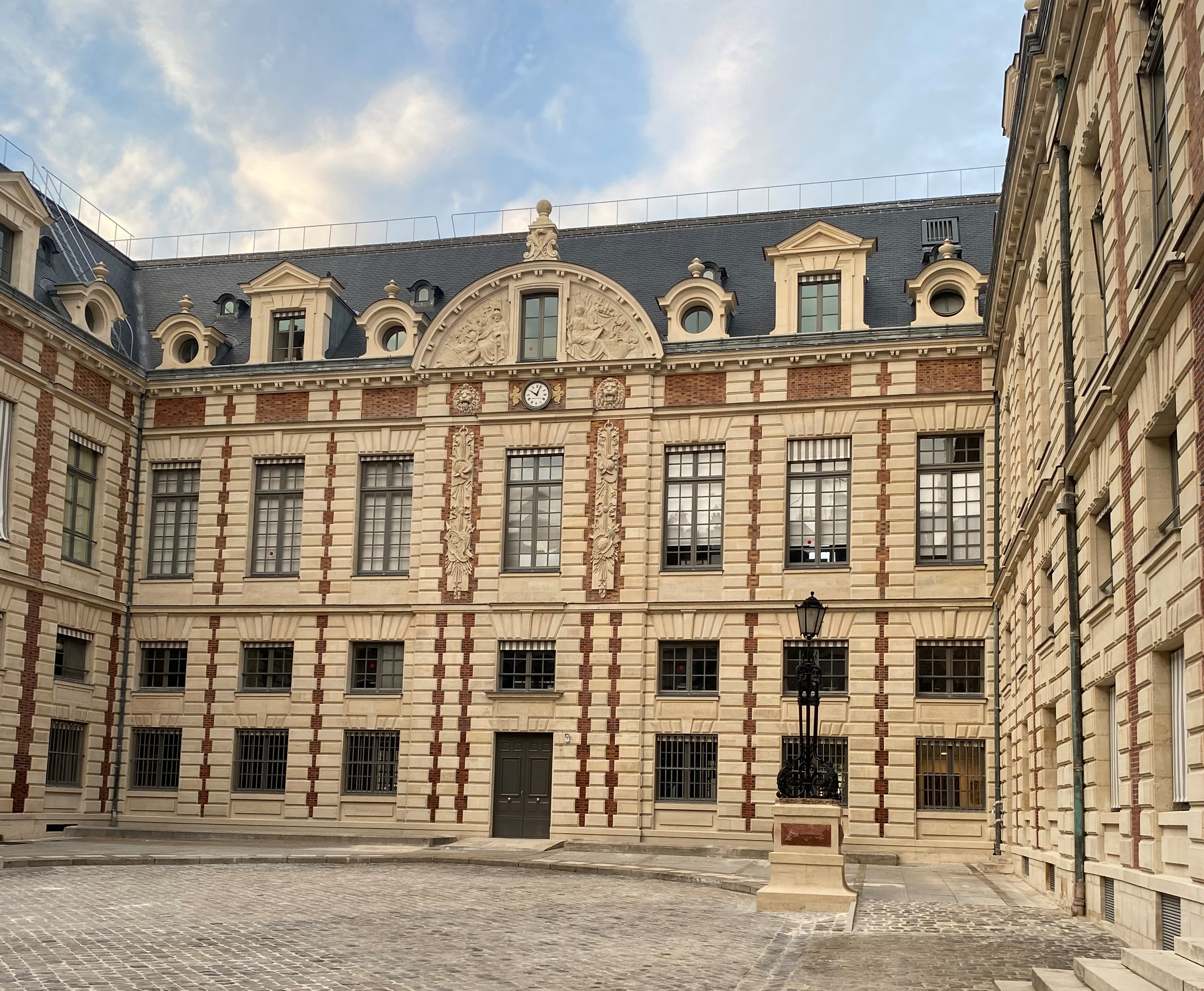
Courtyard of former Hôtel Tubeuf, on rue des Petits-Champs

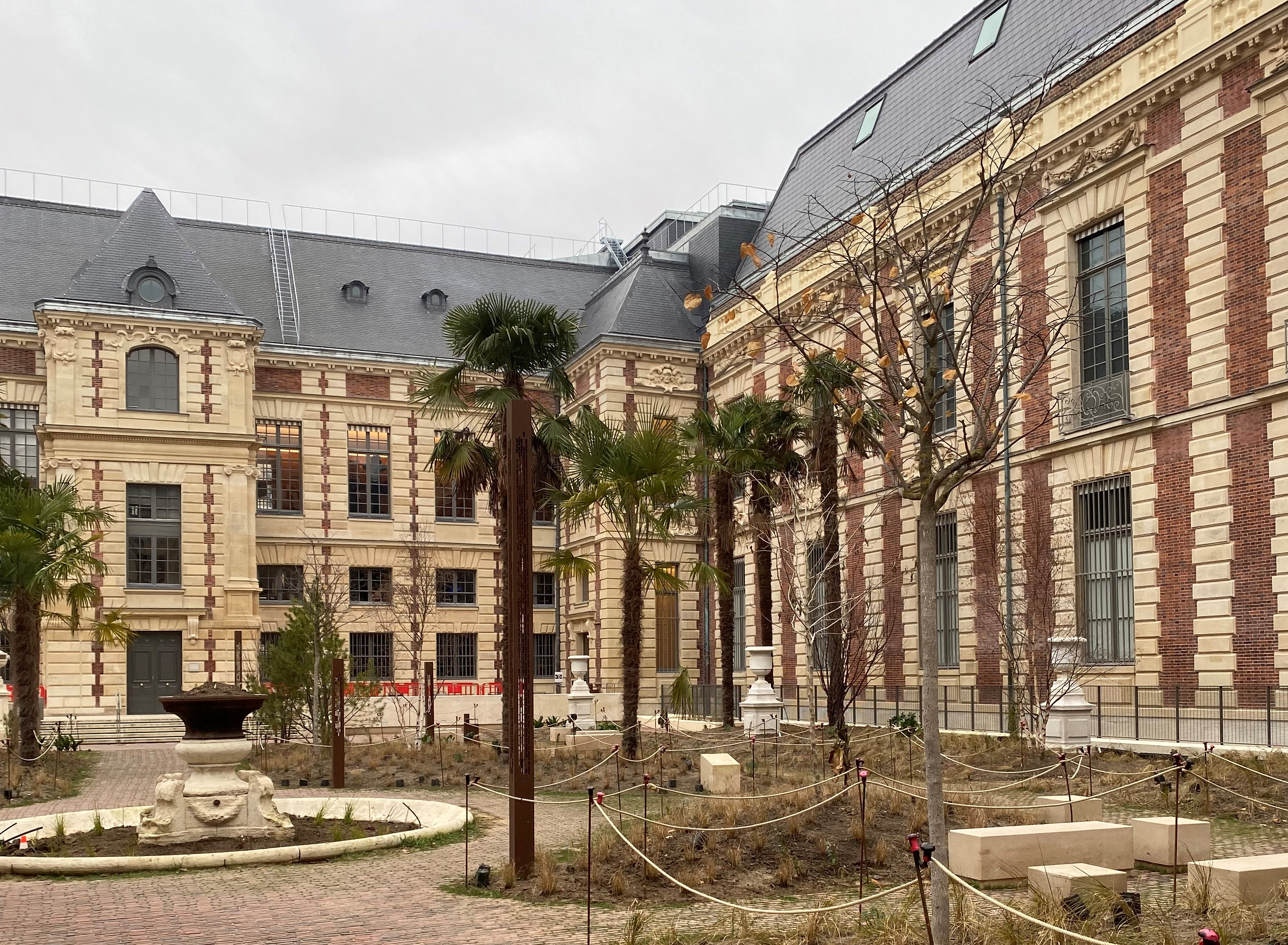
Garden bordering rue Vivienne

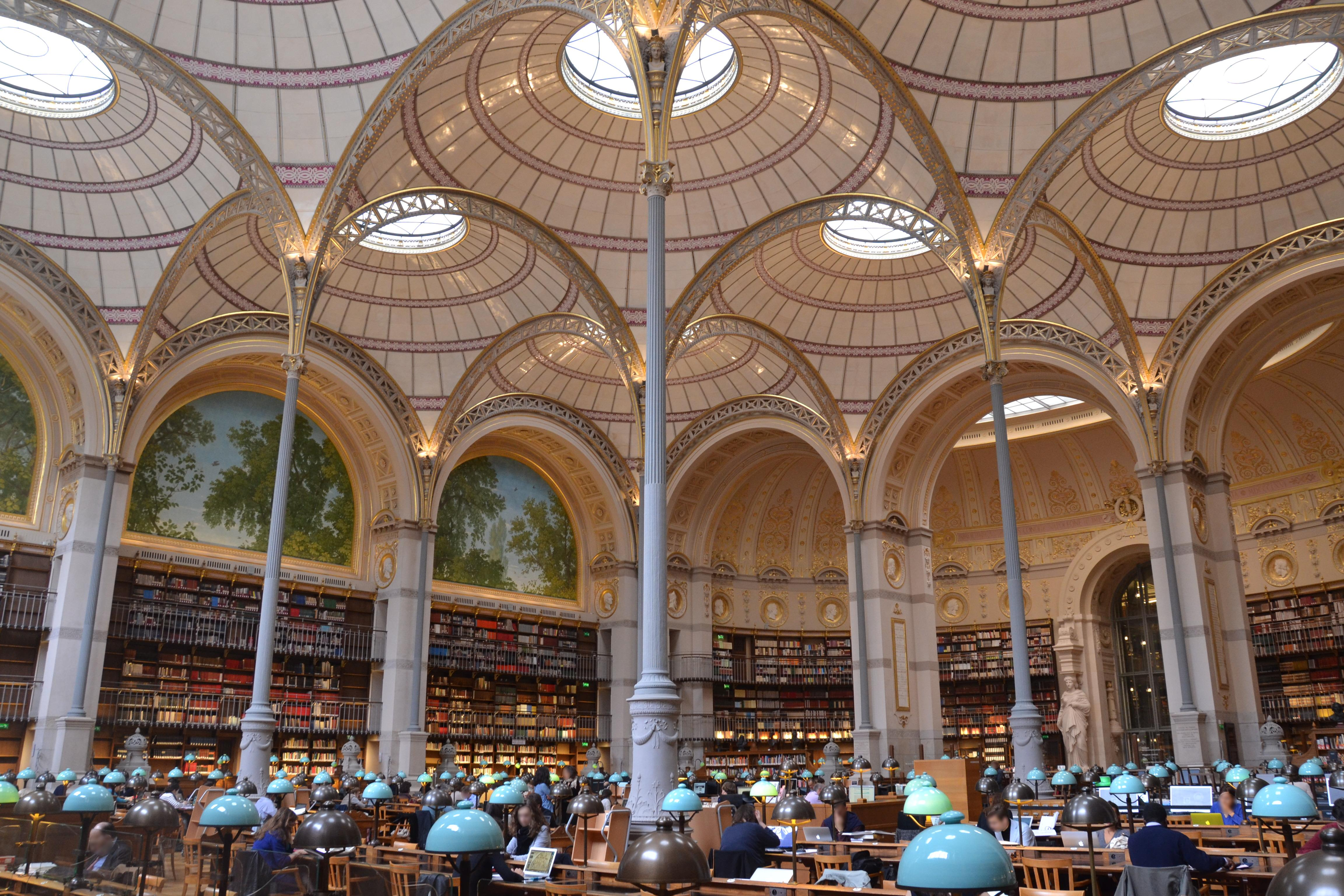
Salle Labrouste

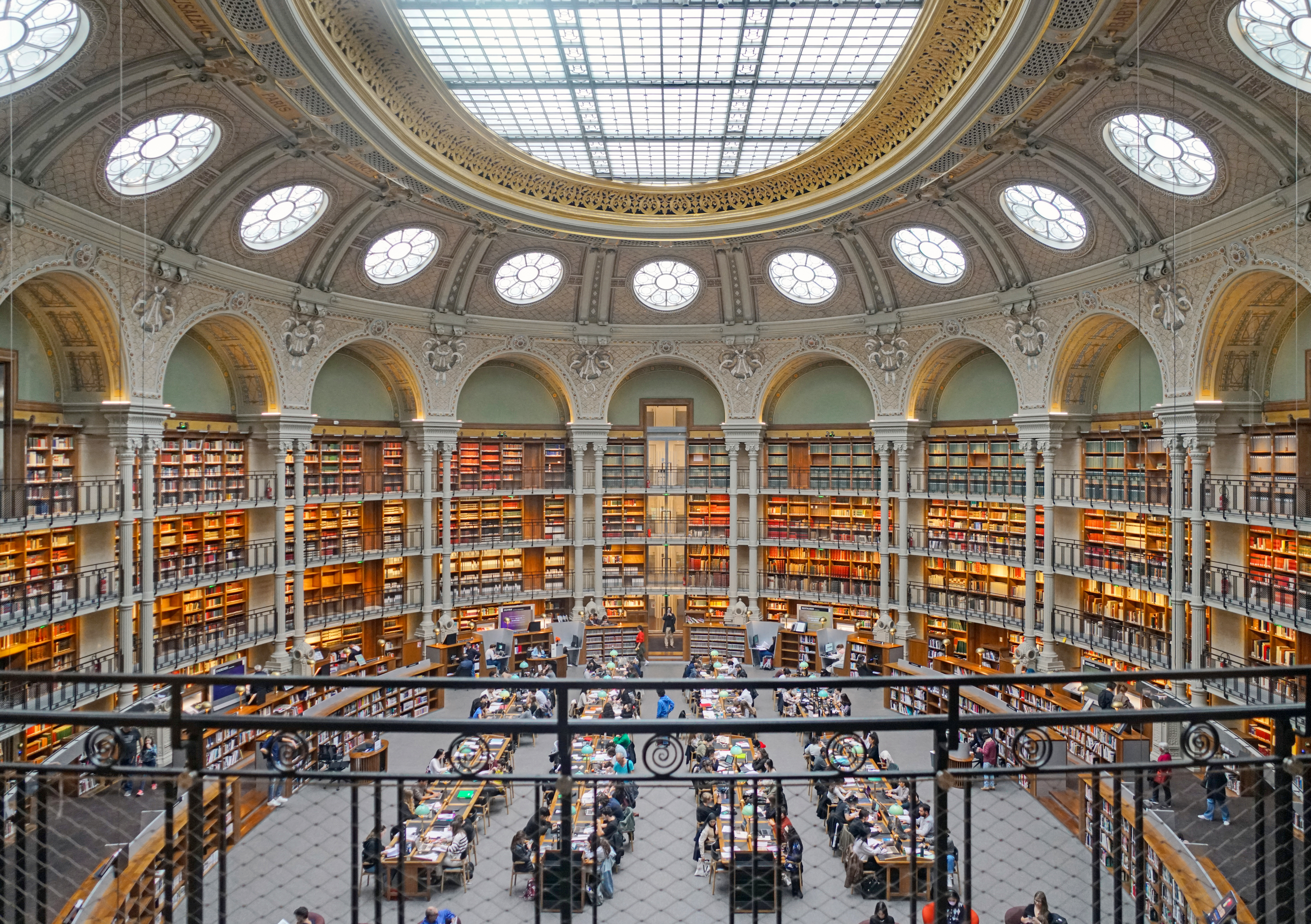
Salle Ovale

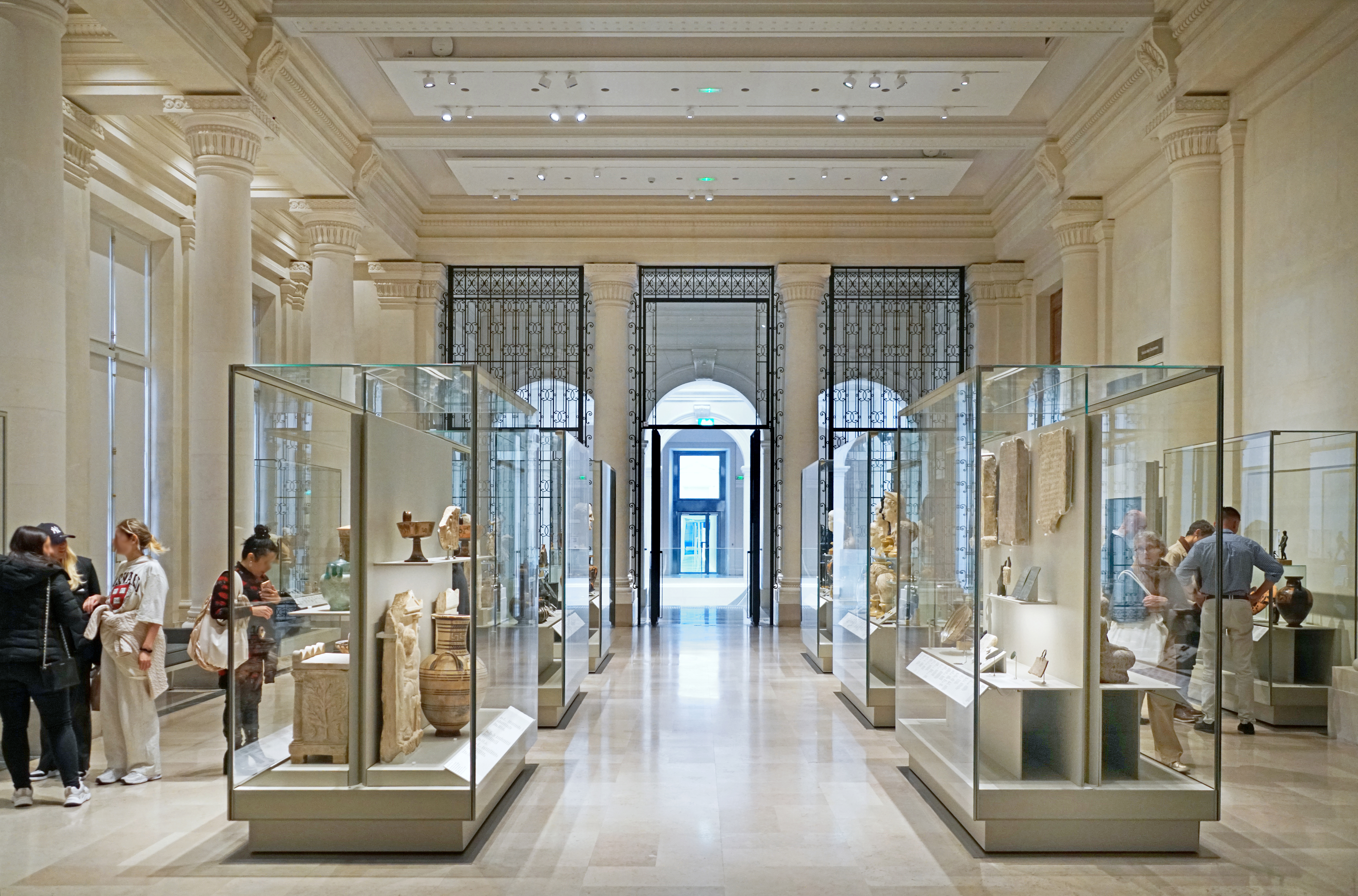
BnF Museum, salle des Colonnes

== François-Mitterrand site ==
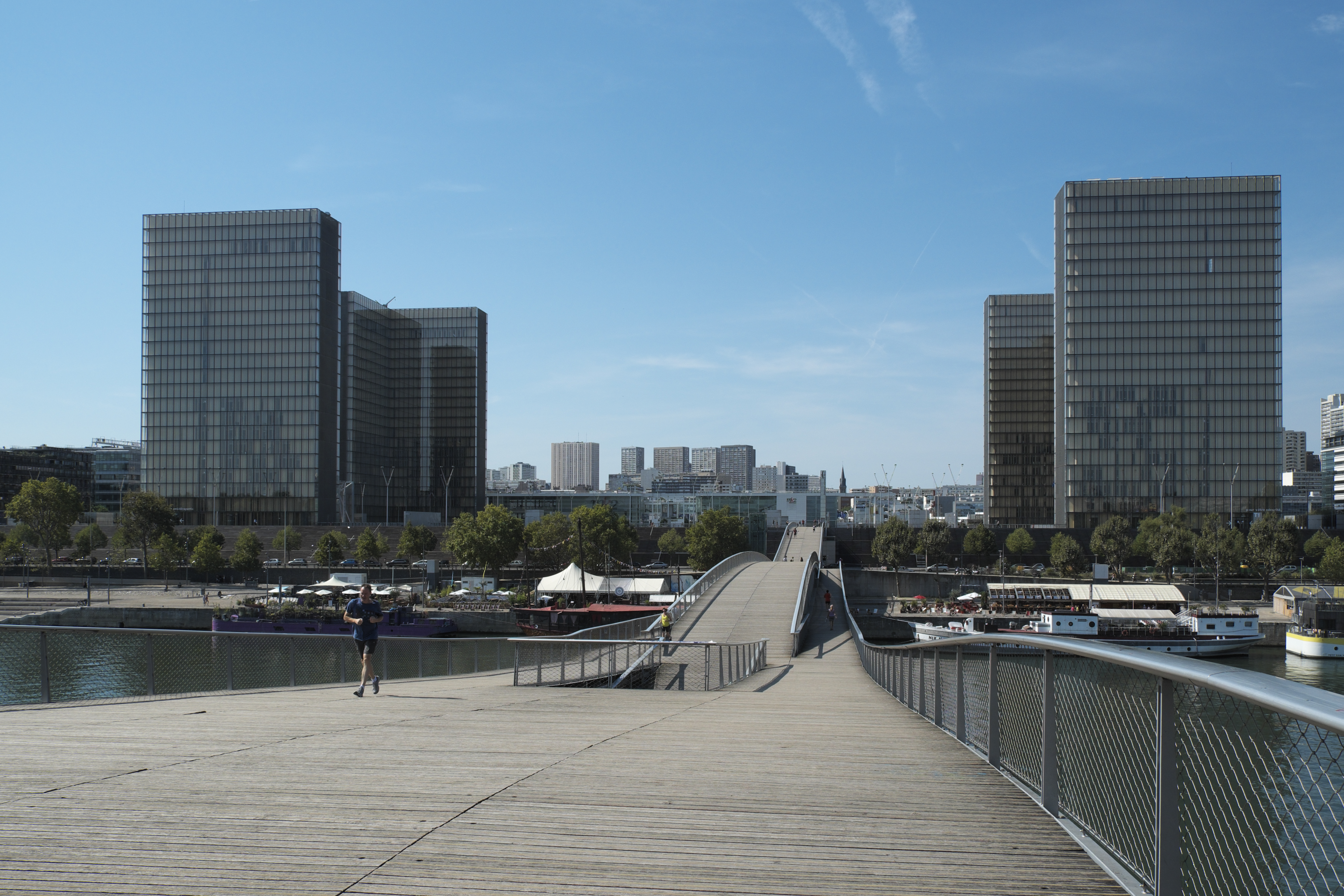
View of the Bibliothèque nationale de France, François-Mitterrand site

On 14 July 1988, President François Mitterrand announced "the construction and the expansion of one of the largest and most modern libraries in the world, intended to cover all fields of knowledge, and designed to be accessible to all, using the most modern data transfer technologies, which could be consulted from a distance, and which would collaborate with other European libraries". Due to initial trade union opposition, a wireless network was fully installed only in August 2016.

In July 1989, the services of the architectural firm of Dominique Perrault were retained. The design was recognized with the European Union Prize for Contemporary Architecture in 1996. The construction was carried out by Bouygues. Construction of the library ran into huge cost overruns and technical difficulties related to its high-rise design, so much so that it was referred to as the "TGB" or "Très Grande Bibliothèque" (lit. 'Very Large Library', a sarcastic allusion to the successful TGV high-speed rail system). After the move of the major collections from the Rue de Richelieu, the National Library of France was inaugurated on 15 December 1996.

As of 2016, the BnF contains roughly 14 million books at its four Parisian sites (Bibliothèque François-Mitterrand, Richelieu, Arsenal, and Opéra) as well as printed documents, manuscripts, prints, photographs, maps and plans, scores, coins, medals, sound documents, video and multimedia documents, and scenery elements. The library retains the use of the Rue de Richelieu complex for some of its collections.

Plan of the Bibliothèque François-Mitterrand

Located near the Metro station: Bibliothèque François Mitterrand.

== Manuscript collection ==
The Manuscripts department houses the largest collection of medieval and modern manuscripts worldwide. The collection includes medieval chansons de geste and chivalric romances, eastern literature, eastern and western religions, ancient history, scientific history, and literary manuscripts by Pascal, Diderot, Apollinaire, Proust, Colette, Sartre, etc. The collection is organised:

- according to language (Ancient Greek, Latin, French and other European languages, Arabic, Coptic, Ethiopian, Hebrew, Persian, Turkish, Near- and Middle-Eastern languages, Chinese, Japanese, Tibetan, Sanskrit, Tamil, Indian languages, Vietnamese, etc.)
  - The library holds about 5,000 Ancient Greek manuscripts, which are divided into three fonds: Ancien fonds grec, fonds Coislin, and Fonds du Supplément grec.
- according to content: learned and bibliophilic, collections of learned materials, Library Archives, genealogical collections, French provinces, Masonic collection, etc.

== Digital library ==
Gallica is the digital library for online users of the Bibliothèque nationale de France and its partners. It was established in October 1997. Today it has more than six million digitized materials of various types: books, magazines, newspapers, photographs, cartoons, drawings, prints, posters, maps, manuscripts, antique coins, scores, theater costumes and sets, audio and video materials. All library materials are freely available.

On 10 February 2010, a digitized copy of Scenes of Bohemian Life by Henri Murger (1913) became Gallica's millionth document. In February 2019, the five millionth document was a copy of the manuscript "Record of an Unsuccessful Trip to the West Indies" stored in the Bibliothèque Inguimbertine and on 30 March 2023 the ten millionth document was added.

As of 2024, Gallica had made available online approximately 10 million documents:

- 864,428 books
- 186,495 manuscripts
- 5,804,801 newspapers and magazines issues
- 1,792,736 images
- 196,486 maps
- 64,967 music scores
- 52,004 audio recordings
- 519,877 objects
- 5,585 video recordings

Most of Gallica's collections of texts have been converted into text format using optical character recognition (OCR-processing), which allows full-text search in the library materials.

Each document has a digital identifier, the so-called ARK (Archival Resource Key) of the National Library of France and is accompanied by a bibliographic description.

== List of directors ==
=== 1369–1792 ===
- 1369–1411: Gilles Mallet ^{(fr)}
- 1522–1540: Guillaume Budé
- 1540–1552: Pierre Duchâtel
- 1552–1567: Pierre de Montdoré
- 1567–1593: Jacques Amyot
- 1593–1617: Jacques-Auguste de Thou
- 1617–1642: François Auguste de Thou
- 1642–1656: Jérôme Bignon
- 1656–1684: Jérôme II Bignon
- 1560–1604: Jean Gosselin
- 1604–1614: Isaac Casaubon
- 1614–1645: Nicolas Rigault
- 1645–1651: Pierre Dupuy
- 1651–1656: Jacques Dupuy
- 1656–1676: Nicolas Colbert; Pierre de Carcavi (1663–1683)
- 1676–1684: Louis Colbert; Melchisédech Thévenot (1684–1691)
- 1684–1718: Camille Le Tellier de Louvois; Nicolas Clément (1691–1712)
- 1719–1741: Jean-Paul Bignon
- 1741–1743: Jérôme Bignon de Blanzy
- 1743–1772: Armand-Jérôme Bignon
- 1770–1784: Jérôme-Frédéric Bignon; Grégoire Desaunays (from 1775 to 1793)
- 1784–1789: Jean-Charles-Pierre Le Noir (démission)
- 1789–1792: Louis Le Fèvre d'Ormesson de Noyseau

=== 1792–present ===
- 1792–1793: Jean-Louis Carra and Sébastien-Roch Nicolas de Chamfort ^{(fr)}
- 1793: Jean-Baptiste Cœuilhe (interim)
- 1793–1795: Jean Baptiste Lefebvre de Villebrune
- 1795–1796: André Barthélemy de Courcay
- 1796–1798: Jean-Augustin Capperonnier
- 1798–1799: Adrien-Jacques Joly
- 1799–1800: Aubin-Louis Millin de Grandmaison
- 1800–1803: Jean-Augustin Capperonnier
- 1803–1806: Pascal-François-Joseph Gossellin
- 1806–1829: Bon-Joseph Dacier
- 1830–1831: Joseph Van Praet
- 1832: Joseph Van Praet
- 1832: Jean-Pierre Abel-Rémusat
- 1832–1837: Jean-Antoine Letronne
- 1838–1839: Edmé François Jomard
- 1839: Charles Dunoyer
- 1839–1840: Antoine Jean Letronne
- 1840–1858: Joseph Naudet
- 1858–1874: Jules-Antoine Taschereau; the Paris Commune appointed Élie Reclus (29 April to 24 May 1871)
- 1874–1905: Léopold Delisle
- 1905–1913: Henry Marcel
- 1913–1923: Théophile Homolle
- 1923–1930: Pierre-René Roland-Marcel
- 1930–1940: Julien Cain
- 1940–1944: Bernard Faÿ
- 1944–1945: Jean Laran (interim)
- 1945–1964: Julien Cain
- 1964–1975: Étienne Dennery
- 1975–1981: Georges Le Rider
- 1981–1984: Alain Gourdon
- 1984–1987: André Miquel
- 1987–1993: Emmanuel Le Roy Ladurie
- 1989–1994: Dominique Jamet
- 1994–1997: Jean Favier
- 1997–2002: Jean-Pierre Angremy
- 2002–2007: Jean-Noël Jeanneney
- 2007–2016: Bruno Racine
- 2016–2024: Laurence Engel
- 2024–present: Gilles Pécout

== Notable patrons ==
Raoul Rigault, leader during the Paris Commune in 1871, was known for habitually occupying the library and reading endless copies of the newspaper Le Père Duchesne.

== In popular culture ==
Alain Resnais directed Toute la mémoire du monde (transl. All the Memory in the World), a 1956 short film about the library and its collections.

== See also ==
- Enfer, a department within the BnF
- Legal deposit
- Books in France
- BnF, Mélanges de Colbert 60
- Bibliothèque de l'Arsenal
- Bibliothèque-Musée de l'Opéra National de Paris
- National electronic library
- Dossiers Secrets d'Henri Lobineau
- Project Blinkenlights
- Pierre-Fanlac Media Library
- List of libraries in France
