= Proposed partition of Algeria =

Proposed plan to divide French Algeria

The Partition of Algeria also called French Israel was proposed in plans to divide French Algeria into several territories. Proposed in 1957 within the French political class, these proposals aimed to end the Algerian War while preserving French sovereignty over a portion of Algeria. These plans were rejected, and all of Algeria gained its independence on July 5, 1962 following the Évian Accords.

== Different plans ==
=== Hersant Plan (1957) ===
As early as 1957 the radical deputies Robert Hersant, André Hugues, Pierre Naudet and Jean de Lipkowski stated: "France and the nationalists must, for an indefinite period, engage in two parallel and peaceful experiments. Geography and population distribution assign each side its own sphere of influence. The nationalists will have to conduct theirs in an area where the Muslim population constitutes the overwhelming majority." They proposed the creation of a French province fully integrated into metropolitan France, covering the Algiers region and most of Oran, except for the area around Tlemcen, which had a large Muslim majority. Algerian nationalists would obtain two territories: an Autonomous Republic of Constantine covering the Constantine region and Kabylia to the east, and a smaller Autonomous Territory of Tlemcen to the west, encompassing the department of Tlemcen and part of the district of Aïn Témouchent. The plan was quickly rejected by the Assembly, including by some of the Radicals, as well as by the public.

=== Peyrefitte Plan (1961) ===
Six plans proposed by Peyrefitte.

In 1961 the continued existence of French Algeria was increasingly compromised politically despite the military successes achieved by the Challe Plan. Prime Minister Michel Debré mentioned the partition of Algeria, as a last resort, in his declaration to the National Assembly on June 28, 1961.

He argued for "separation" by citing the example of other successful partitions, implicitly referring to Israel.

Should it turn out that all reasonable avenues appear closed, we must learn from this. The map already shows the portions of territory where the population of European origin predominates. Without cooperation and association, the security not only of this population but also of the Muslim population resolved to remain with us would then only be ensured by separation and an autonomous organization, the remaining inhabitants living without France having to provide for them. Such a separation would not be at all a new phenomenon in the world, and our century provides many examples. It has even happened that geographical divisions have been implemented and successful for the benefit of Muslim populations, in order to prevent them from being left to others in whom they could not place their trust. […] The risk of secession and partition is not our doing.” If all those who speak about Algeria shared our concern for its future, and understood that nothing can be built without brotherhood, then the matter would be won, for the greater good of all."

In August 1961, UNR deputy Alain Peyrefitte also put forward a proposal for the partition of Algeria. Hubert Beuve-Méry, director of the newspaper Le Monde, published Peyrefitte's proposal in four editions of his paper at the end of September 1961. President Charles de Gaulle received Alain Peyrefitte at the Élysée Palace on November 19, 1961, and commissioned him to write a report on his proposal. Peyrefitte listed four points.

== Reception ==
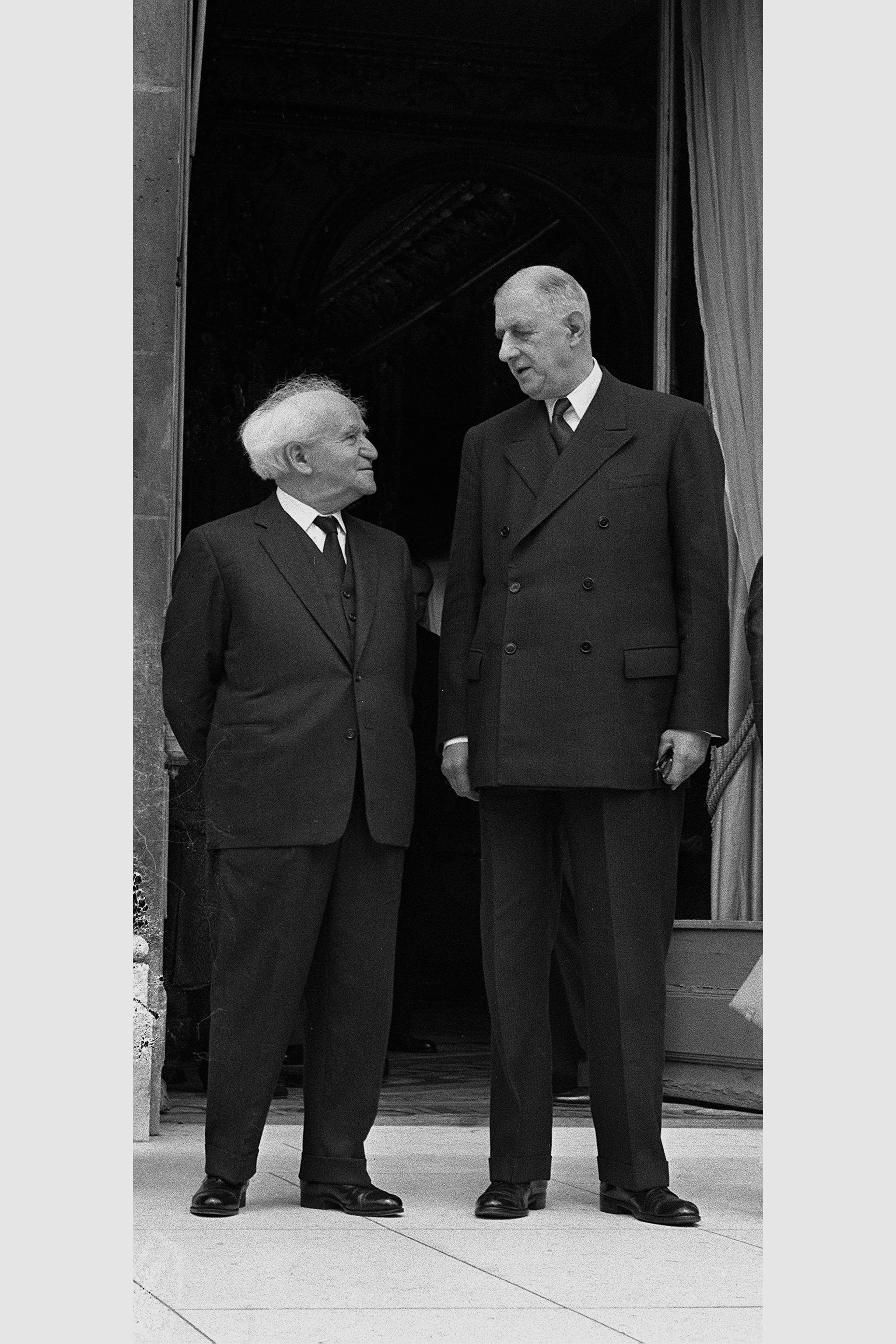
Meeting between De Gaulle and Ben Gurion at the Élysée Palace in 1960

The announcements from Paris had repercussions in Algeria; the FLN, hostile to the idea of partition, organised a demonstration on 5 July 1961. Similarly, the Algerian Democratic rally demonstrated its opposition. as did Morocco, also stating that it would militarily intervene at any attempts at partition in Algeria.

President Charles de Gaulle responded to Peyrefitte's report: “In short, you want to create a French Israel. That’s what Ben-Gurion wanted me to do when he came to see me. But he warned me: ‘It will only work if you send more French settlers en masse, if they settle permanently, and if they enlist as soldiers to fight.’ Can you imagine that? The Pied-Noirs want our army to defend them, but they’ve never felt the need to defend themselves! Can you see them stationing themselves at their borders to take over from the French army?”.
