= Bon-Joseph Dacier =

French historian, philologist and translator

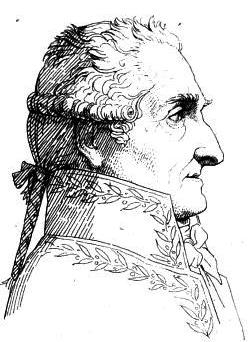
Bon-Joseph Dacier

Bon Joseph Dacier (Valognes, 1 April 1742 – Paris, 4 February 1833) was a French historian, philologist and translator of ancient Greek. He became a Chevalier de l'Empire (16 December 1813), then Baron de l'Empire (29 May 1830). He also served as curator of the Bibliothèque nationale.

== Biography ==
After studying at the collège d'Harcourt, he became the student and assistant of Étienne Lauréault de Foncemagne. Dacier came to public notice in 1772 via his translation of the Histories of Claudius Aelianus and the same year became an associate member of the Académie des inscriptions, becoming its president and permanent secretary in 1782. In that position, he wrote the organisation's history from 1784 to 1830. He translated the Cyropaedia by Xenophon (1777). He became a member of Paris's corps municipal in 1790 and led the imposition of the new system of contributions directes, but refused Louis XVI's offer of the post of finance minister. After retiring to Seine-et-Oise during the French Revolution, he became a member of the Tribunat in 1799. In 1800 he was made curator of manuscripts at the Bibliothèque nationale and elected to the Académie des Sciences morales et politiques.

It was to Dacier that Champollion sent his famous 1822 letter, known widely as Lettre à M. Dacier, revealing his discovery of how to decipher Egyptian hieroglyphs. At age 80, Dacier was elected to the Académie française in 1822; at the time he was the oldest member of the society. He was made a baron on 26 May 1830. Pierre-François Tissot, his successor in the Académie, said of him that "he had the sanest ideas on scholarship, and he unceasingly tended to give it a useful and philosophical direction. "Don't look for gold mines" he said to his brother-academicians and especially to their young emulators. [ ... ] Nothing could be more dangerous than his elogies; they were believed like an epigram by Lebrun. On the other hand, he liked to support the development of talent; after having the good luck of having found something, his greatest pleasure was to bring it to public light." Biographic notice n° 124, devoted to him on page 118 of Le premier siècle de l'Institut de France (1895), gives his name as "DACIER (Le Baron Bon, Joseph)". He is buried in the cimetière du Père-Lachaise (29th Division, 4th line, S, 33).

== Main works ==
Journals edited by Bon Joseph Dacier included the Journal des sçavans, and he also wrote on the history of the Order of Saint Lazarus (of which he was a member). He also wrote several historical articles.

=== Translations ===
- Histoires diverses d'Élien le Sophiste (1772).
- La Cyropédie, ou Histoire de Cyrus (by Xenophon, 2 volumes, 1777)

=== Other ===
- Les chroniques de Jehan Froissart (1788). Left incomplete due to the 1793 troubles
- Rapport historique sur les progrès de l'histoire et de la littérature ancienne depuis 1789 et sur leur état actuel (1810). Reissued : Belin, Paris, 1989. – commissioned by Napoleon I of France and published in 1810, remains a reference work for historians of the French Revolution.
- Histoire et mémoires de l'Institut royal de France. Académie des inscriptions et belles-lettres (10 volumes, 1821–33)

Academic offices
Preceded by François-Pascal Gosselin	Administrateur général of the Bibliothèque nationale	Succeeded by Joseph-Basile-Bernard Van Praet
