= Laurence Engel =

French essayist and civil servant (born 1966)

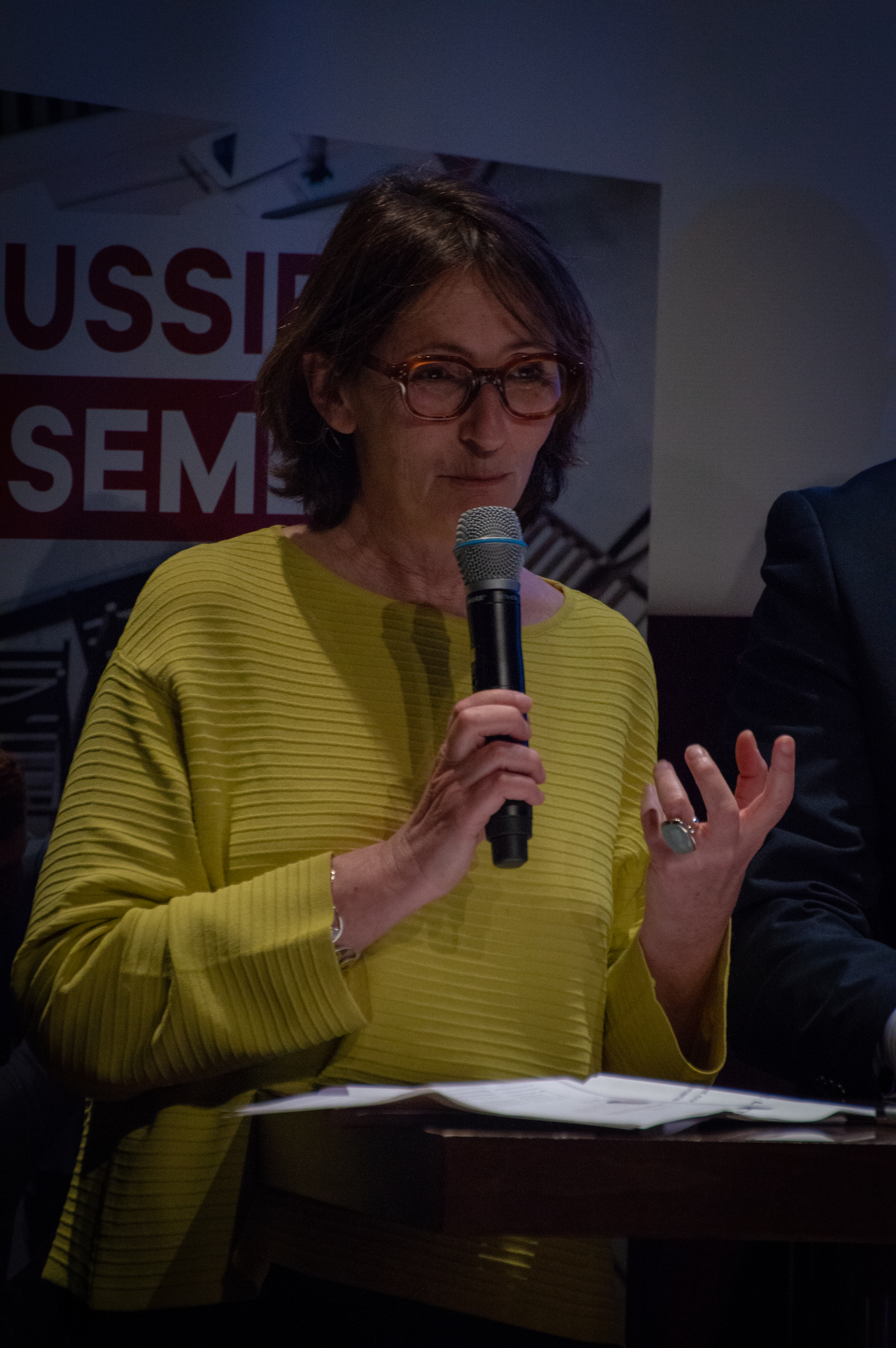
- Engel in 2023

President of the Bibliothèque nationale de France
- In office 5 April 2016 – 6 April 2024
- Preceded by: Bruno Racine
- Succeeded by: Gilles Pécout

Personal details
- Born: 17 September 1966 (age 60) Paris, France

Laurence Engel (born 17 September 1966) is a French essayist and senior civil servant.

In 2016, she was appointed president of the Bibliothèque nationale de France, a position she held until April 2024.

== Biography ==
The daughter of shopkeepers, Laurence Engel was born on September 17, 1966, in the 12th arrondissement of Paris.

After attending Lycée Charlemagne High School and then Henri-IV High School, she earned a master's degree in literature; She then attended the Paris Institute of Political Studies (1989, Public Service track), the École normale supérieure de Fontenay-Saint-Cloud (1987 L), and the École nationale d'administration (ENA, Condorcet class).

After attending Lycée Charlemagne High School and then Henri-IV High School, she earned a master’s degree in literature; she then attended the Paris Institute of Political Studies (1989, Public Service track), the École normale supérieure de Fontenay-Saint-Cloud (1987 L), and the École nationale d'administration (ENA, Condorcet class).
