= Bruno Racine =

French civil servant and writer (born 1951)

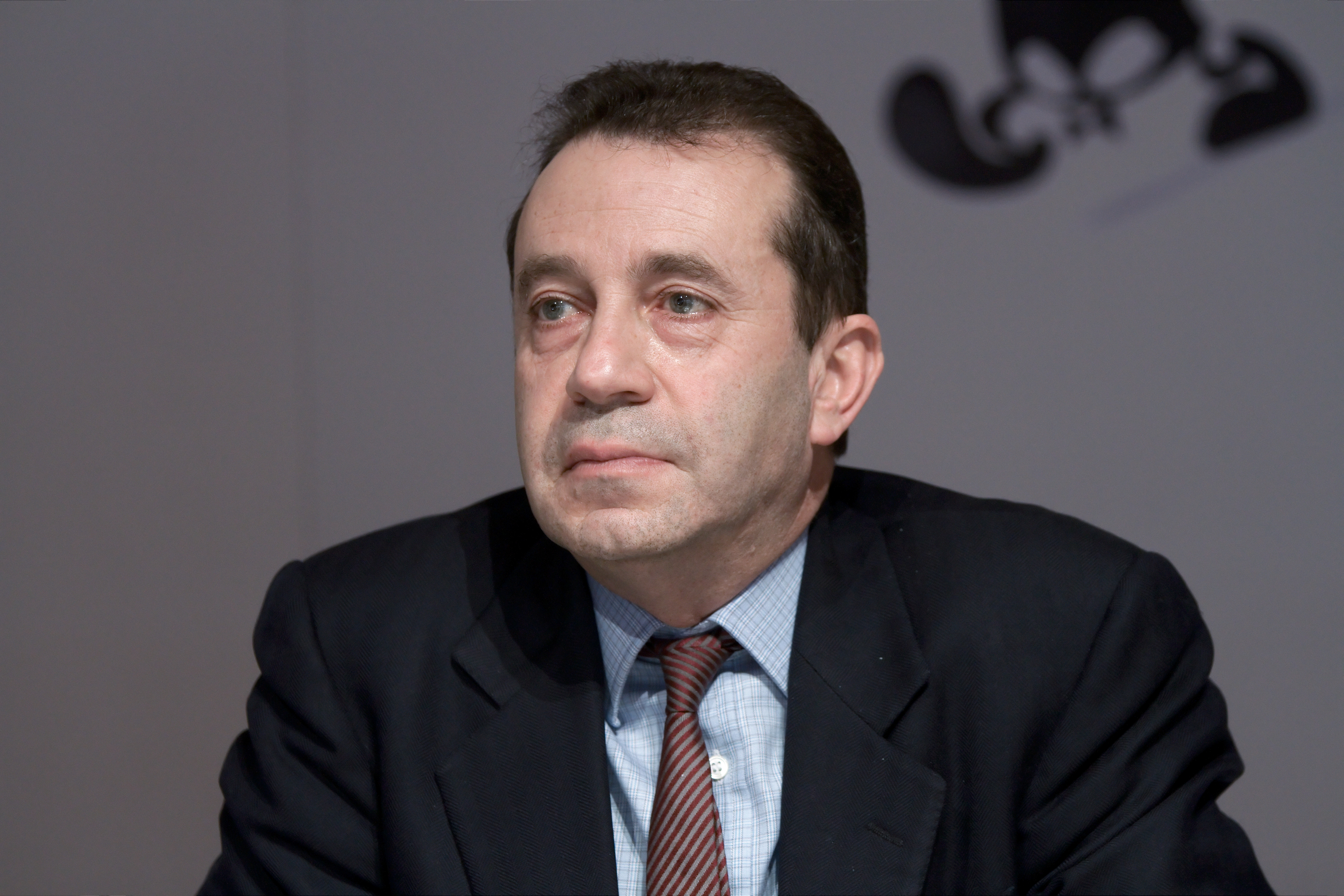
- Bruno Racine in 2010
- Born: 17 December 1951 (age 74); Paris, France
- Education: Lycée Louis-le-Grand
- Alma mater: École Normale Supérieure, Sciences Po, ÉNA
- Occupations: Director of the Bibliothèque nationale de France (2007-2016)

Bruno Racine (born 17 December 1951 in Paris) is a French civil servant and writer.

== Early life and education ==
Bruno Racine was born in Paris. Racine is the son of Pierre Racine (a conseiller d'État) and Edwina Morgulis. He studied at the École La Rochefoucauld, then at the lycée Louis-le-Grand before entering the École Normale Supérieure in 1971 and obtaining an agrégation in "lettres classiques". He also followed courses at the Institut d'études politiques de Paris and entered the École nationale d'administration in 1977.

== Career ==
Racine left the ENA for the Cour des Comptes where he was named auditor in 1979, then "conseiller référendaire" in 1983. On 5 September 1981, he married Béatrice de Bégon de Larouzière-Montlosier, and they have had 4 children.

Racine entered the service for strategic affairs and disarmament in the Ministry of Foreign Relations (1983–1986) before joining the cabinet of Jacques Chirac, Prime Minister as a 'chargé de mission' (1986–1988).

In 1988, he was named director of cultural affairs for the city of Paris, occupying that post until 1993, when he joined the cabinet of Alain Juppé, again as "chargé de mission auprès du ministre", and at the same time director of the Centre d'analyse et de prévision (1993–1995). He then followed him to Matignon as "chargé de mission auprès du Premier ministre", with particular concern for the cultural and strategic portfolios (1995–1997).

Promoted to conseiller maître à la Cour des comptes (1996), Racine became director of the French Academy in Rome (1997–2002) before being named president of the Centre Georges-Pompidou (2002).

In March 2007, Racine was made president of the Bibliothèque nationale de France, to take effect on 2 April 2007, succeeding Jean-Noël Jeanneney, who had reached the age limit for that post.

Following the declaration in January 2009 by Minister of Culture, Christine Albanel that the archives of Guy Debord constituted a national treasure, Racine was tasked with ensuring the necessary funds – amounting to several hundred thousand euros – for the BNF to purchase them from Alice Becker-Ho, Debord's widow.

Following his departure in 2016, Racine was succeeded as president of the Bibliothèque nationale de France by Laurence Engel, who took up the post on 11 April 2016.

== Other activities ==
- Fondation pour la recherche stratégique (FRS), Member of the Board of Directors (since 2001)
- Haut conseil de l’éducation, Member (since 2005)

== Works ==
- Le Gouverneur de Morée, 1982, Prix du Premier Roman
- Terre de promission, 1986
- Au péril de la mer, 1991, Prix des Deux Magots 1992
- La Séparation des biens, 1999, Prix La Bruyère from the Académie française 1999
- L'Art de vivre à Rome (collaboration), 1999, Grand prix du livre des arts from the Société des gens de lettres 2000
- L'Art de vivre en Toscane, 2000
- Le tombeau de la Chrétienne, 2002
- Le côté d'Odessa, 2007
- Google et le nouveau monde, 2010
- Adieu à l'Italie, 2012

== Honours ==
- Knight of the Légion d'honneur
