= Praet =

Praet is a surname. Notable people with the surname include:

- Dennis Praet (born 1994), Belgian footballer
- Peter Praet (born 1949), Belgian economist

== See also ==
- Pratt
- Van Praet
