= Louis Le Fèvre d'Ormesson de Noyseau =

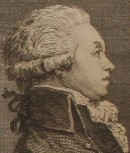
Portrait gravé of Lefèvre d’Ormesson de Noyseau (circa 1790)

Anne Louis François de Paule Lefèvre d'Ormesson de Noyseau (known as Monsieur de Noiseau), (26 February 1753 - 20 April 1794) was a French deputy, librarian, and Hellenist. From 1789 to 1792 he was director of the Bibliotheque du Roi (Royal Library), the precursor to the Bibliothèque nationale de France. He died on the guillotine in Paris, accused of being a royalist.

== Biography ==
He was the son of Louis Lefèvre d'Ormesson, the president of the Parlement of Paris exiled to Orly during the Maupeou reform of 1771.

Louis entered the same parliament on 6 September 1770 and was a councillor until it dissolved in 1771. He became Président à mortier (presiding member) on 15 March 1779, taking over the position previously held by his father.

On 7 May 1789 he was elected with 113 of 200 votes to the Estates-General as a deputy for the nobility, from the Paris-Hors-les-Murs (Paris outside the walls) constituency, by the prévôts and other aristocracy of Paris. He was part of the ecclesiastical committee that produced the law on the Civil Constitution of the Clergy adopted by the Assembly, and also one of the deputies brought back to Paris with the king on 6 October 1789 after the Women's March on Versailles. He favored the "vote par tête", one deputy one vote, as opposed to the weighted system then in effect. He opposed the abolition of feudal rights, and signed the protests of 12 and 15 September 1791 against the decisions of the Constituent Assembly. His term ended on 30 September 1791 when the new constitution took effect, creating the National Assembly.

He succeeded Jean-Charles-Pierre Lenoir in 1790 at the Royal Library and was there until August 1792, when he became a member of the commission of public monuments, and of the Académie des Inscriptions et Belles-Lettres as a distinguished Hellenist.

He was arrested in December 1793 as a royalist along with Jean Baptiste Gaspard Bochart de Saron. He was brought before the Revolutionary Tribunal, and condemned to death for having signed a protest against the abolition of the parliaments. This protest was found in the papers of Lepeletier de Rosambo, when he was arrested with all his family in the Château de Malesherbes, with his father-in-law Chrétien Guillaume de Lamoignon de Malesherbes, one of Louis XVI's lawyers. Lefèvre d'Ormesson was executed along with twenty-one other deputies of the old parliaments of Paris and Toulouse on 1 Floréal, Year II.

He married Anne-Louise-Reine-Jeanne Lyon Baillon in 1779. He had no children.

== Bibliography ==
- "Louis Le Fèvre d'Ormesson de Noyseau", in Adolphe Robert and Gaston Cougny, Dictionnaire des parlementaires français (1789–1891), Bourloton, Paris, 1889 Edition details Wikisource
