= BnF, Mélanges de Colbert 60 =

Astronomical manuscript

Mélanges de Colbert 60
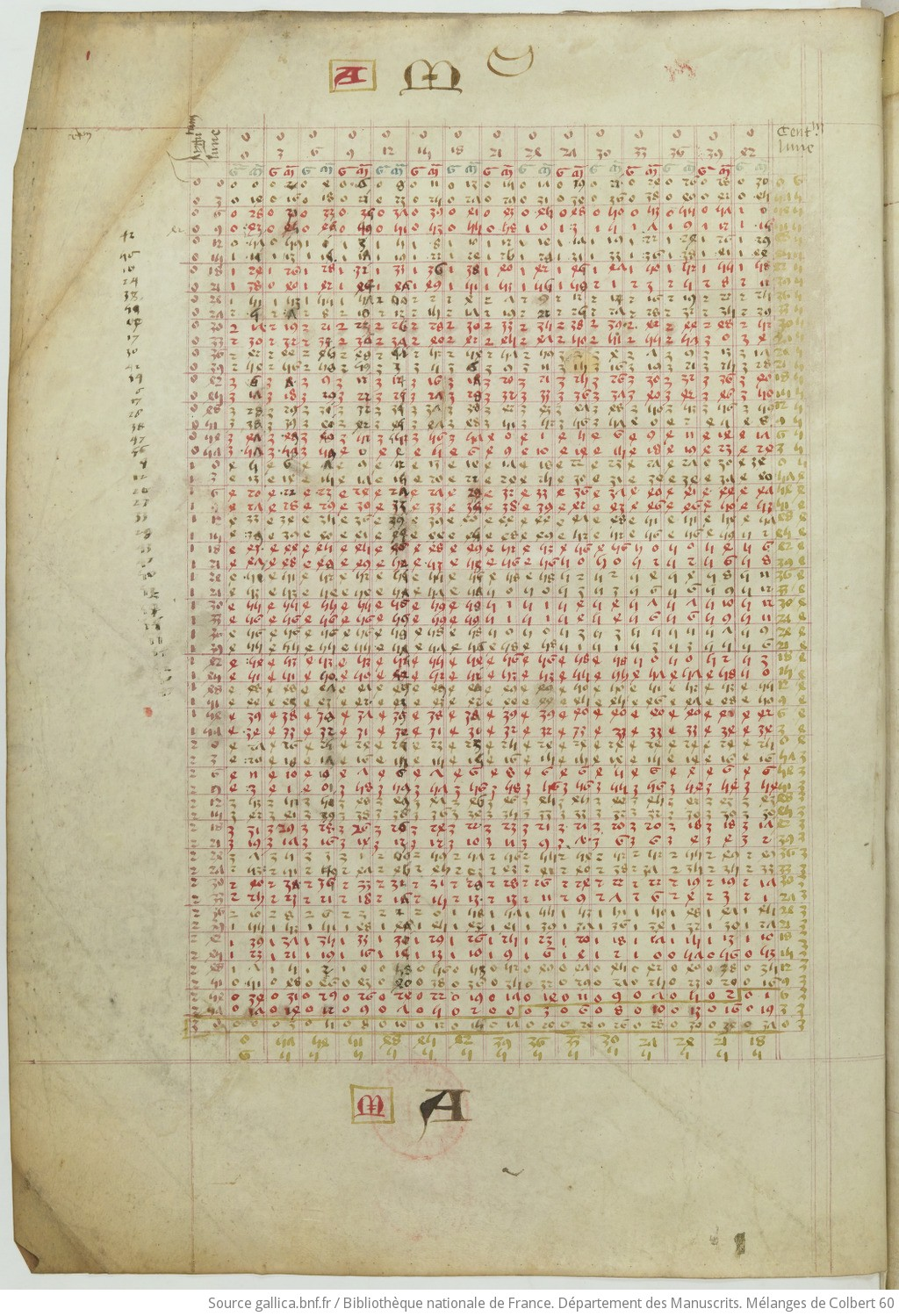
- 1v
- Type: multiple-text manuscript
- Date: Late 15th century
- Place of origin: England/Northern France
- Language: Latin
- Material: Parchment and paper
- Size: 400 × 300 mm
- Format: 182 folios

Mélanges de Colbert 60 (Mel. Col. 60) is a medieval astronomical multiple-text manuscript preserved in the funds of Bibliothèque nationale de France. This manuscript was compiled, approximately, at the end of the 15th century, using different codicological units originating from the 14th and 15th century.

The main interest in the Mel. Col. 60 in the history of astronomy, are the different versions of the Oxford tables and John of Lignères' Tabule magne, which underlines the circulation of these famous alfonsine texts between continental Europe and the British Isles starting in the 14th century. Another peculiarity of this manuscript is that the canons and tables of the Tabule magne are conserved within the same codex, which is unusual for the transmission of this work

== History ==
Little is known about the composition and provenance of Mel. Col. 60. It was composed around the end of the 15th century. However, the codex consists of several quires, some of which might be from the 14th century, while the others are from the 15th century. The manuscript is made partly of parchment, and partly of paper, which makes it easier for scholars to distinguish the quires of different provenance.

The identity of the compilator of Mel. Col. 60 remains unknown. There are at least two scribal hands that can be observed throughout the manuscript. For instance, the handwriting that copied John of Lignères' canon (starting on folio 34r) is different from one found on folios 42v or 43r, or from the one that has copied John of Mur's canon on folio 175r.

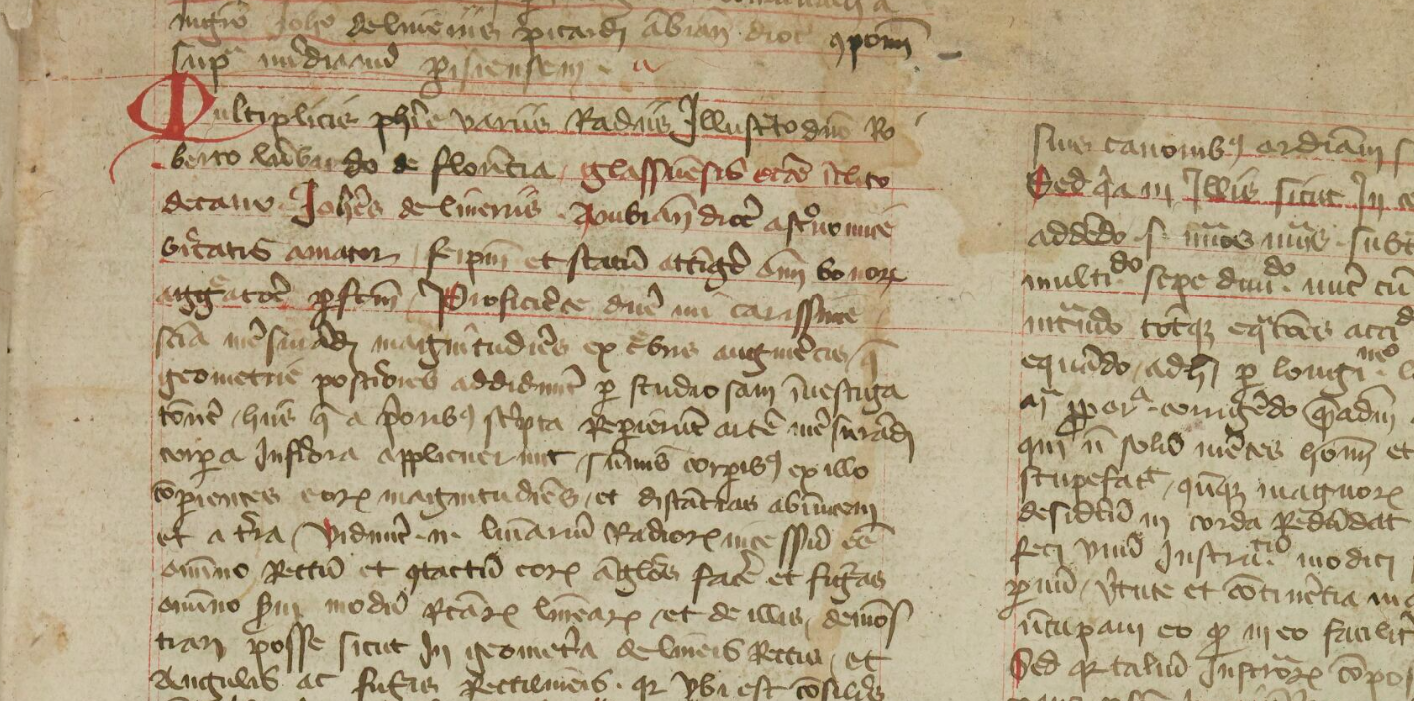
Mel. Col. 60, page 34r

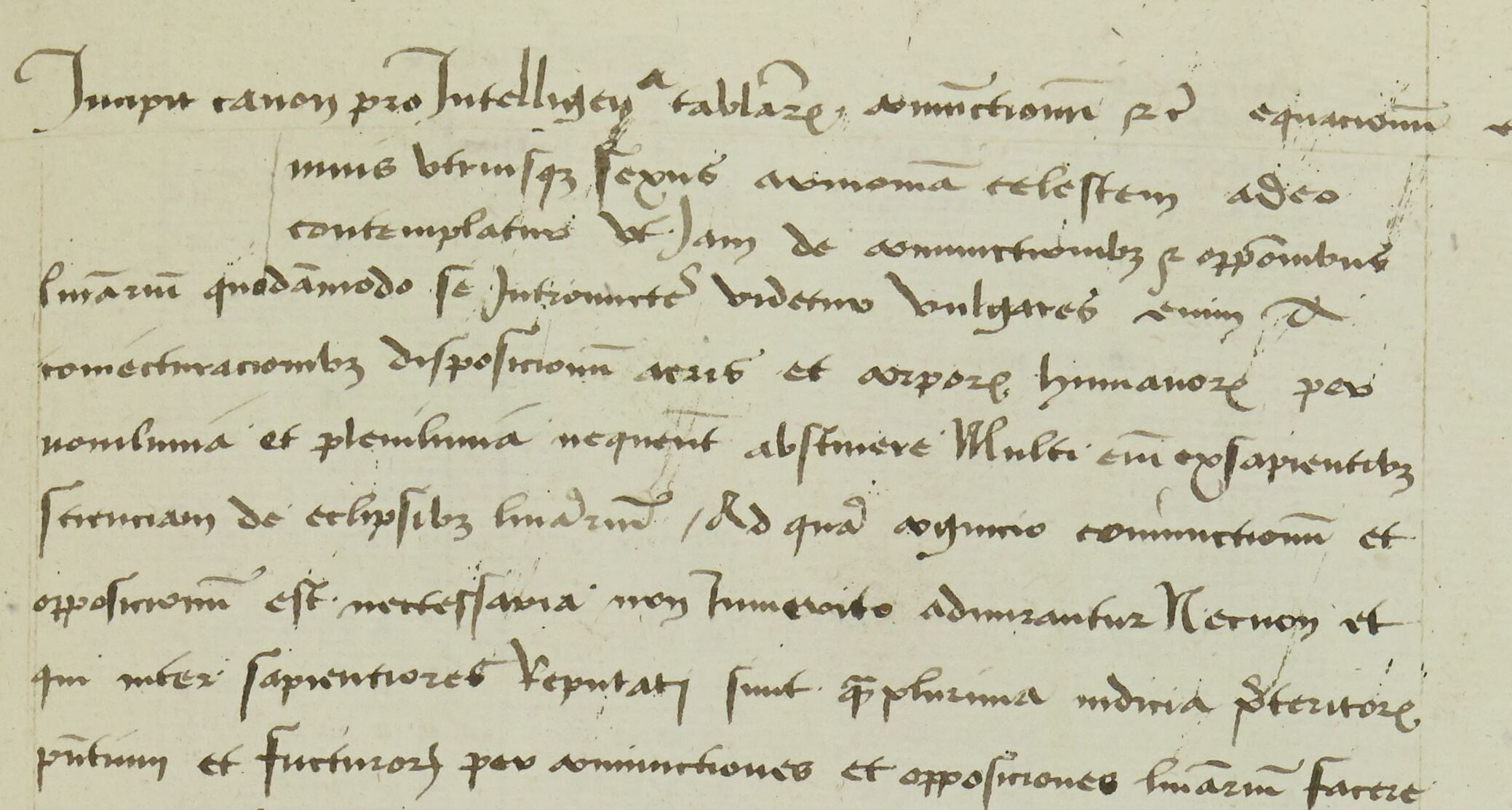
Mélanges de Colbert 60

== Content ==
Mel. Col. 60 is a type of astronomical manuscripts oriented towards practical use and containing various tables and canons that can assist in astronomical computations. The practical aim of Mel. Col. 60 is underlined by the high number of arithmetical tables, which show the compilator's interest in decimal numbers in particular.

The historical interest of the manuscript pertaining to alfonsine astronomy are different Oxford tables and John of Lignères' Tabule magne. However, Mel. Col. 60 contains other works, such as tables for mean motions of the luminaries and the planets (fol. 165r) or tables for conjunctions and oppositions from the year 1299 to 1525 (fol. 175r).

There are canons to the Tabulae permanentes by Firmin de Beauval and John of Murs that can be found on folio 175r.

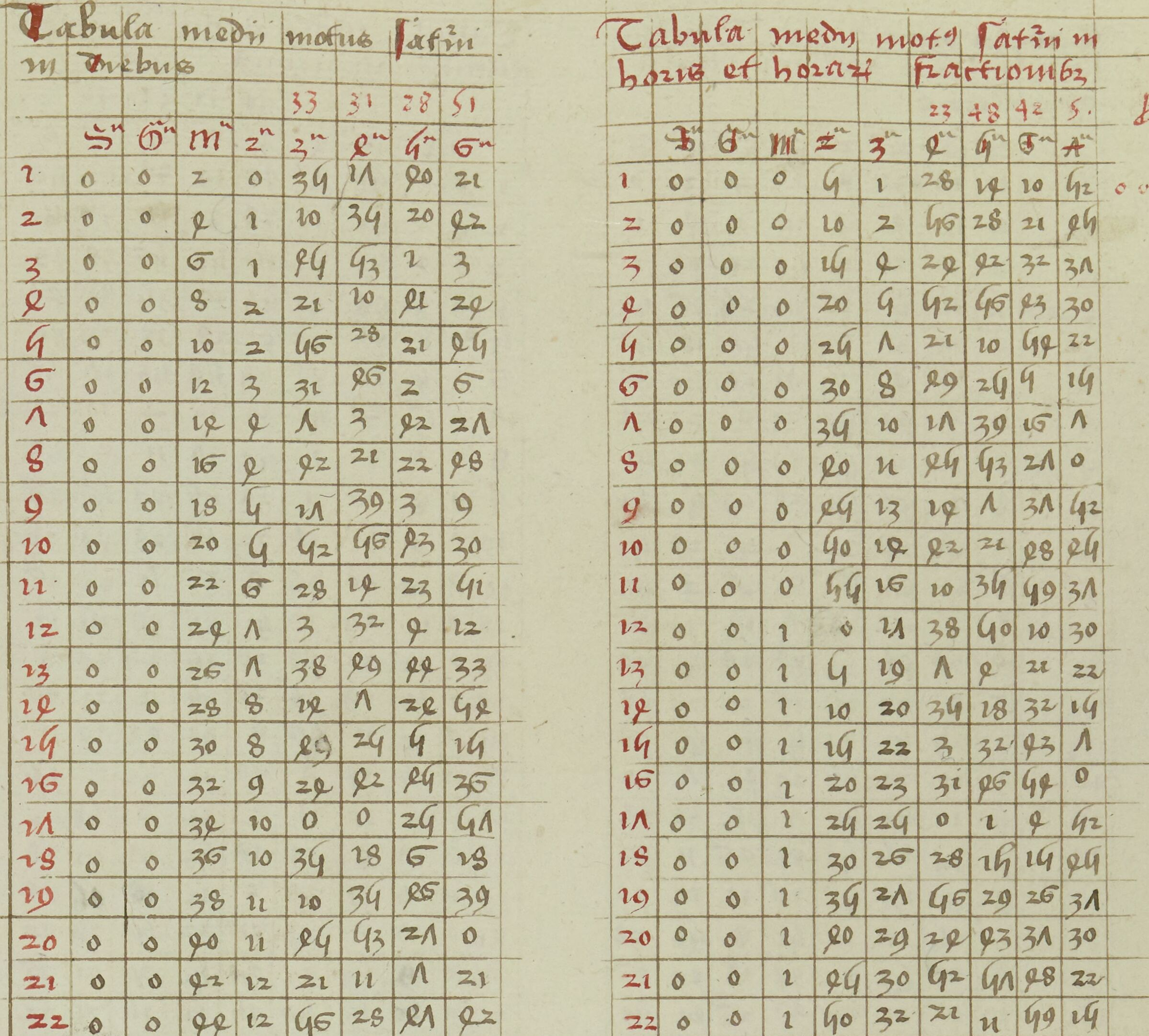
folio 165r

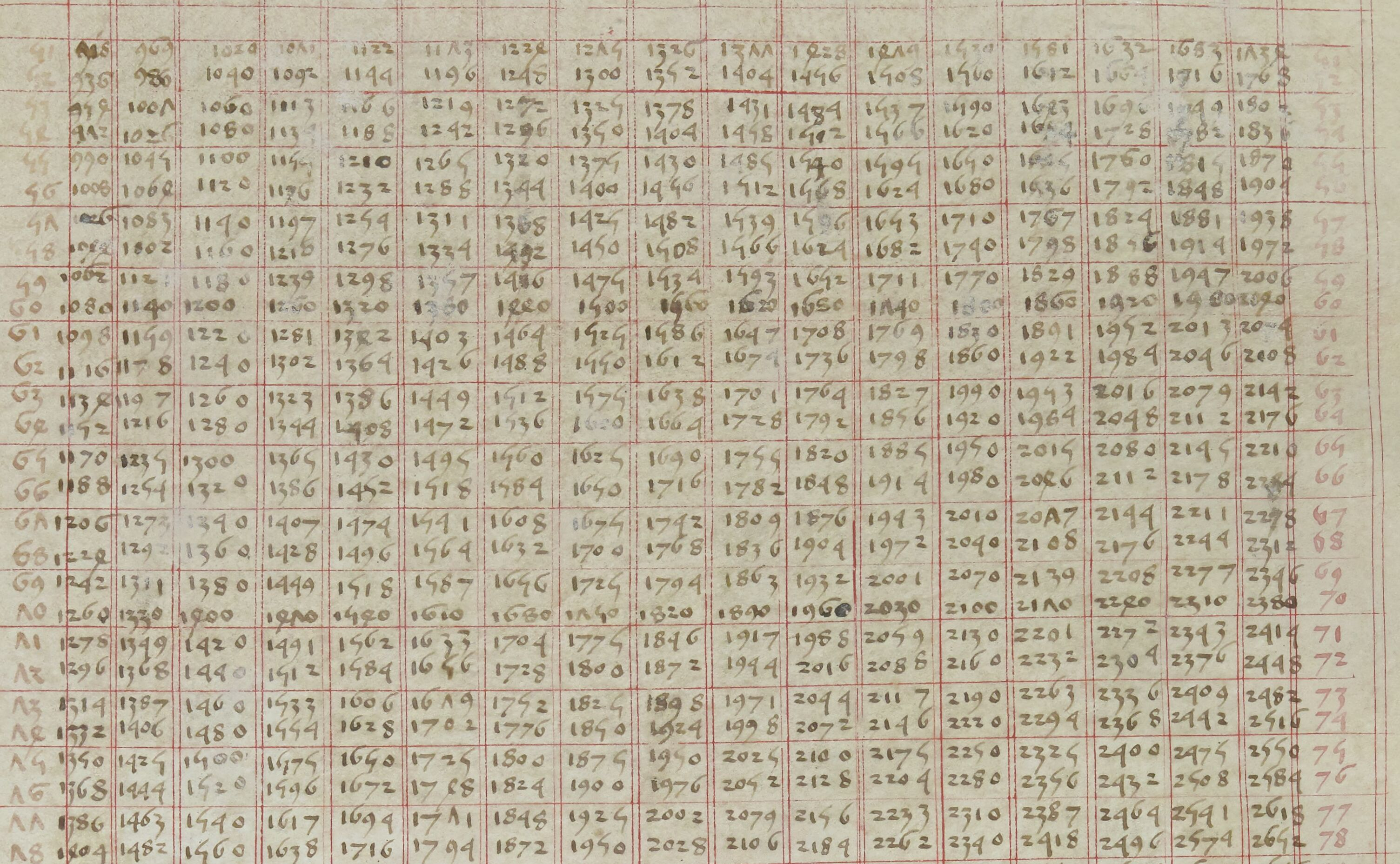
folio 20r

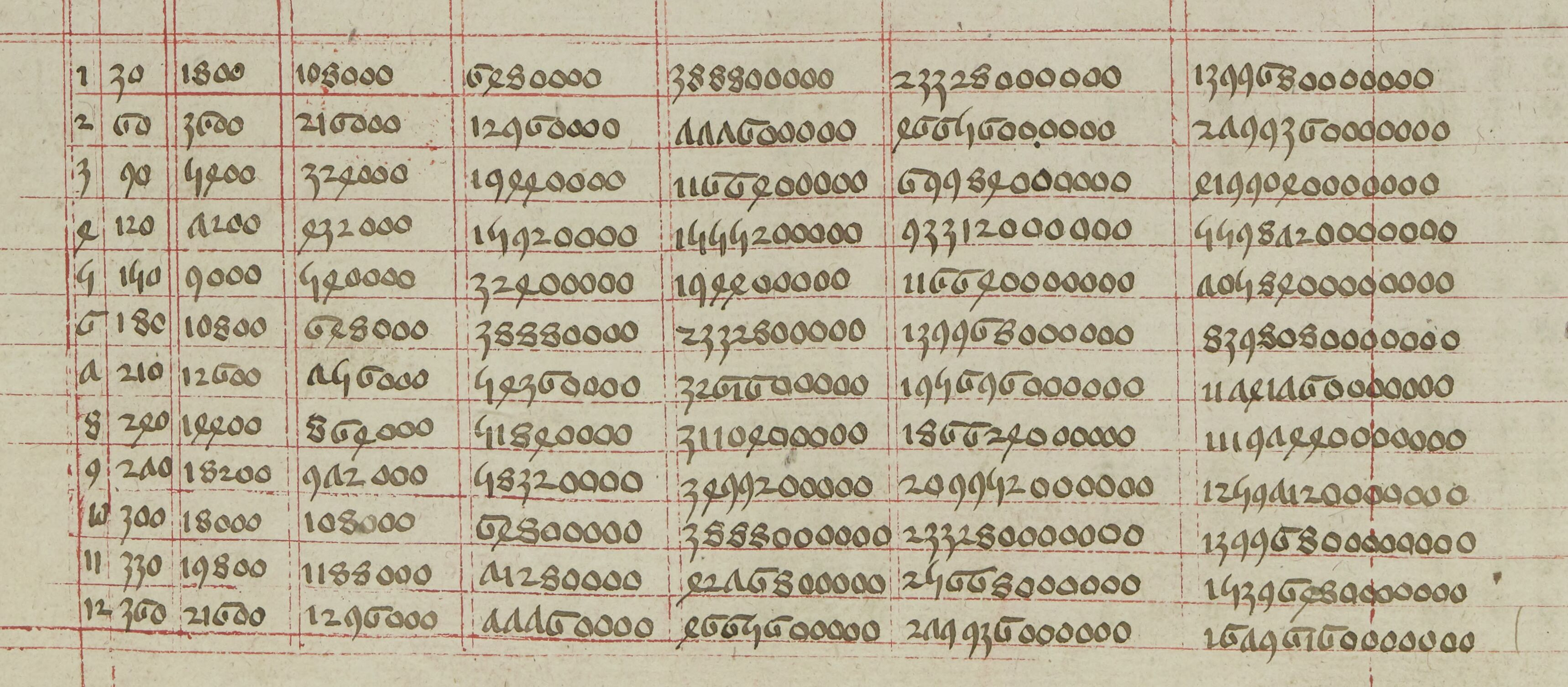
folio 40v

=== Tabule magne ===
John of Lignères. was one of the key figures in the history of the Alfonsine astronomy, to be precise of its Parisian period. His work Tabule magne, consisting of tables accompanied by canons, was composed between 1320 and 1325. Later, John of Lignères integrated Tabule magne into a larger collection of his works, along with the treatises on Saphea and on Equatorium. In the 14th and 15th centuries the text had been circulating around Europe, but most important is its transmission to England, along with the other alfonsine material. The canons to the Tabule magne have been most likely composed by John of Lignères by combining different types of sources; some seem to be using original and alternative approaches to certain computations, while the others seem to follow a more traditional approach

=== Oxford tables ===
After flourishing in Paris during the 14th century, the Alfonsine tradition had made its way to the British Isles, which resulted, alongside other works, into the composition of so-called Oxford tables. Mel. Col. 60 begins with the Oxford tables: folios from 1v to 17r contain double argument tables for the Moon and the planets.

Further folios (63v–94r) contain Oxford tables (composed in 1348) attributed to William Batecombe, a 14th-century an English mathematician and astrologer, followed by the respective canons of the same authorship on folios 94v–96r.

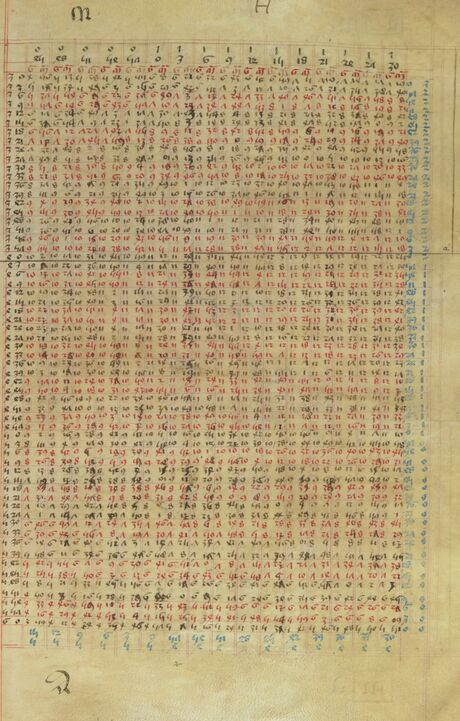
folio 7r

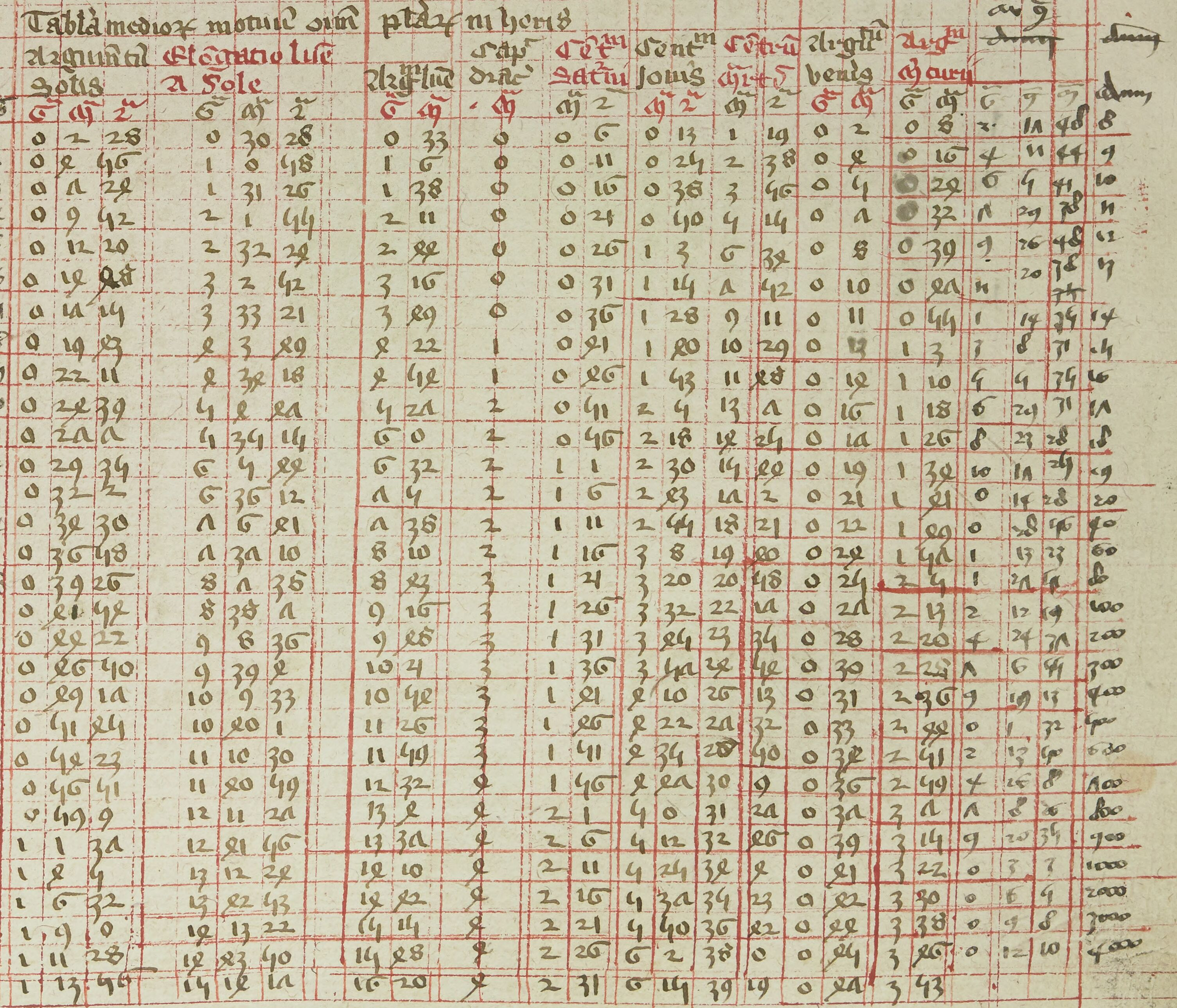
folio 64r
