= Adolfo Van Praet =

Coordinates: 35°01′S 64°03′W

- Rural locality and village
- Country: Argentina
- Province: La Pampa
- Department: Realicó
- Established: 4 October 1903

Area
  - Land: 69.37 sq mi (179.66 km^{2})

Population (2001)
  - Total: 274
- Population
- Time zone: UTC−3 (ART)
- Postcode: L6212
- Area code: 02331

Adolfo Van Praet is a village and rural locality (municipality) in La Pampa Province in Argentina.

== Population ==
Adolfo Van Praet has a population of 274 inhabitants (INDEC, 2001). This represents an increase of 11.8% over the 245 inhabitants of the previous census (INDEC, 1991).
