= Pierre Naudet =

French politician

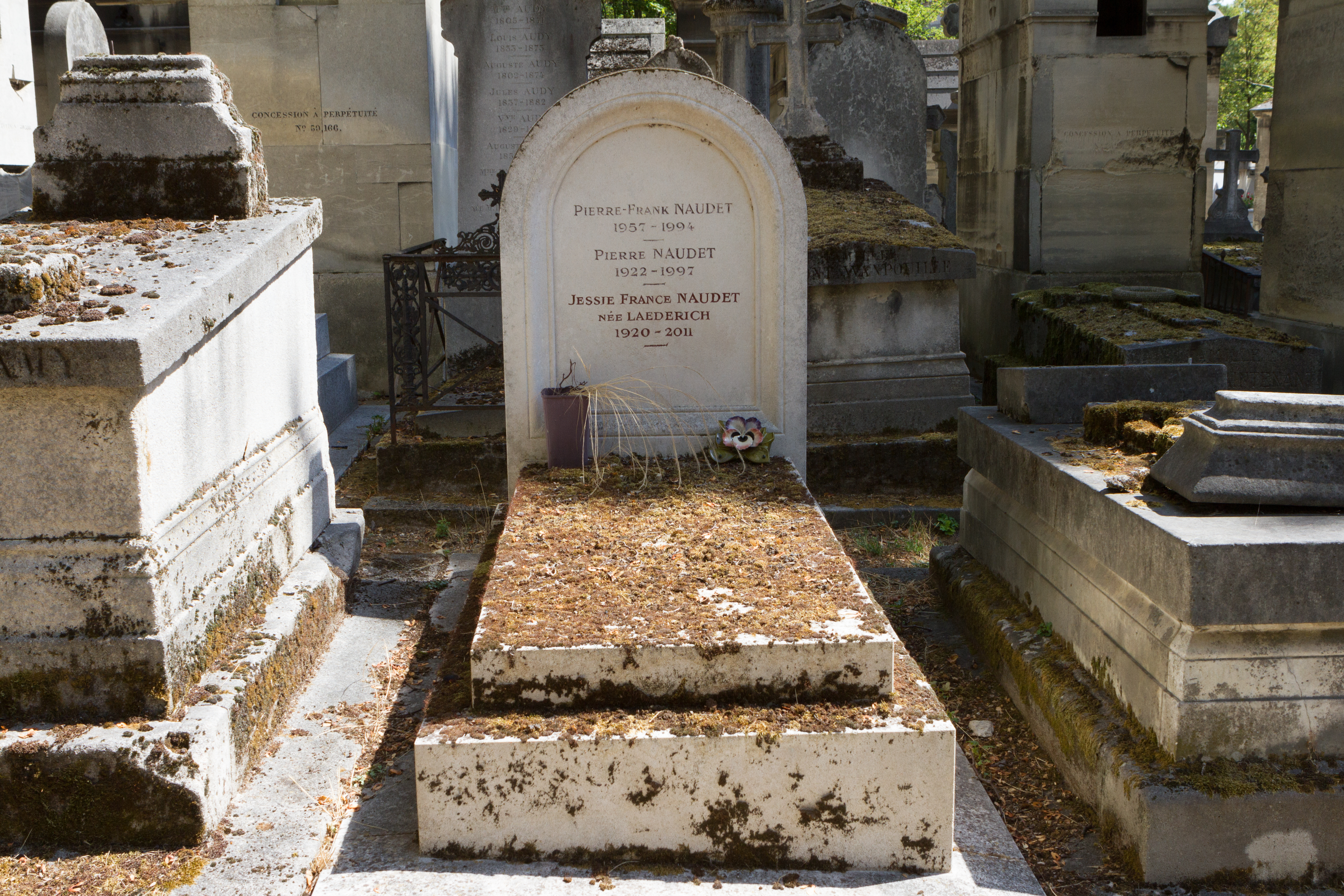
Père-Lachaise.

Pierre Naudet (23 December 1922, Paris – 17 December 1997) was a French politician. He represented the Radical Party in the National Assembly from 1956 to 1958.
