= Joseph Naudet =

French historian

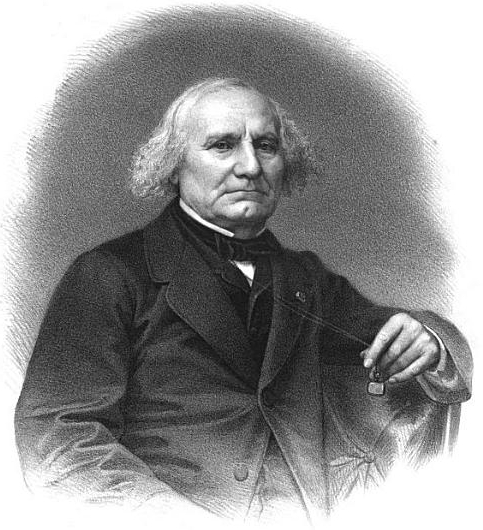
- Joseph Naudet
- Born: 8 December 1786
- Died: 13 August 1878 (aged 91)
- Occupation: historian

Joseph Naudet (8 December 1786 – 13 August 1878) was a French historian who was a native of Paris.

He initially worked at the Ecole Normale Supérieure, and was later a teacher of Latin poetry at the Collège de France. In 1817 he became a member of the Académie des inscriptions et belles-lettres, where in 1852 he was appointed "secrétaire perpétuel". Naudet was also a member of the Académie des sciences morales et politiques and served as curator of the Bibliothèque Mazarine.

Among his written works was a three-volume edition of the comedies of Plautus titled- M. Accii Plauti Comoediae (1830) and a work on Roman nobility called De la noblesse chez les Romains (1868). He also edited and translated works by Catullus, Horace, Lucan, Sallust, Seneca and Tacitus. With Pierre Daunou (1761–1840), he edited the twentieth volume of Recueil des historiens des Gaules et de la France (Compendium of Historians of Gaul and France).

== Selected works ==
- 1811: Histoire de l'établissement, des progrès et de la décadence de la monarchie des Goths en Italie – History on the establishment, progress and decadence of the Gothic monarchy in Italy.
- 1813: Essai de rhétorique, ou Observations sur la partie oratoire des quatre principaux historiens latins – Rhetorical essay; observations on the oratories of the four principal Latin historians.
- 1815: Conjuration d'Étienne Marcel contre l'autorité royale, ou histoire des États-Généraux de la France pendant les années 1355 à 1358 – Conspiracy of Etienne Marcel against royal authority, or history of the States-General of France from 1355 to 1358.
- 1817: Des Changements opérés dans toutes les parties de l'administration de l'Empire romain, sous les règnes de Dioclétien, de Constantin et de leurs successeurs, jusqu'à Julien, (2 volumes); réédition: Elibron Classics, Adamant Media Corporation, 2001 – The changes made in all parts of the administration (Roman Empire) under the reign of Diocletian, Constantine and their successors, up until Julian.
- 1819: De la Responsabilité graduelle des agents du pouvoir exécutif – On the gradual responsibility of agents of executive power.
- 1858: De l'Administration des postes chez les Romains – On the Roman administration of posts.
- 1863: De la Noblesse et des récompenses d'honneur chez les Romains – On nobility and rewards of honor amongst the Romans.
