= Joseph Van Praet =

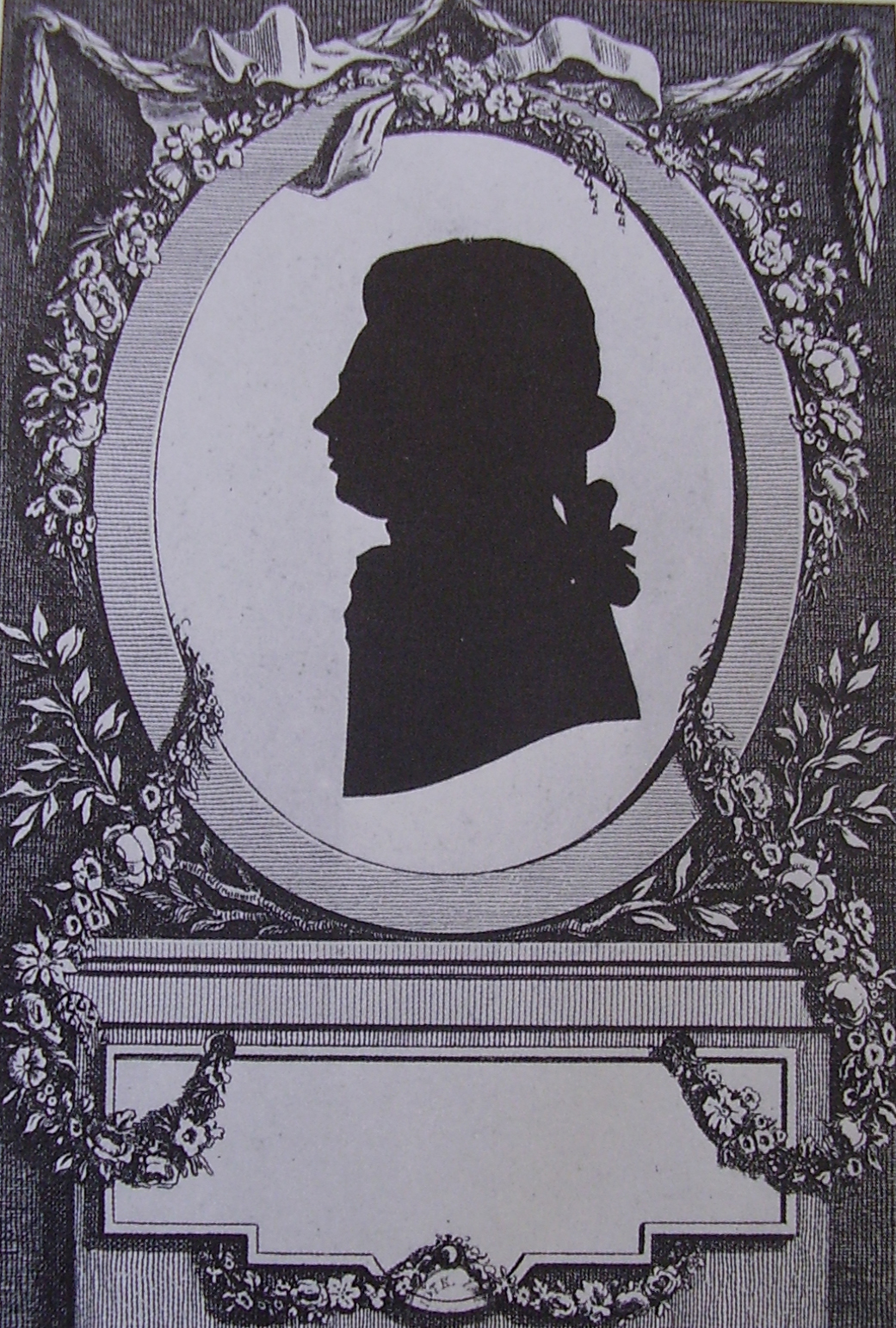
Profile of J. Van Praet by Gonnord

Joseph Basile Bernard Van Praet (Bruges, 27 July 1754 – Paris, 5 February 1837) was a librarian and scholar, born in the Austrian Netherlands, but active in France.

== Life ==
=== Bibliothèque nationale ===
During the French Revolution he increased the stock to three times its previous amount: the printed collection went from 300 000 to more than a million. After the fire at the Abbey of Saint-Germain-des-Prés (19–20 August 1794) he managed to obtain part of the stock and also made acquisitions from booksellers and in public sales. He went on to obtain complete libraries particularly in Italy. He carried on correspondence to acquire important private libraries for the Bibliothèque nationale such as those of Loménie de Brienne (1792), Panzer (1807), Count MacCarthy (1817). His role in the acquisition of collections, his long tenure at the library and his bibliographical knowledge resulted in him being often consulted about the older literature in the library. He had a particular interest in incunabula on vellum of which he compiled a bibliography. Among his acquisitions from booksellers Van Praet found many valuable works which he found it prudent to allocate to particular collections, such as books on vellum, incunabula, annotated editions, fine bindings, etc., so restabishing the concept of "réserve". He bequeathed his private collection of vellum books to the library. His 53 years as librarian were fundamental in the development of the library. Van Praet was elected a member of the Académie des inscriptions et belles-lettres 19 March 1830 and died in 1837.

== Sources ==
- D. Varry, "Joseph Van Praet" in Histoire des bibliothèques françaises, vol III, Les Bibliothèques de la Révolution et du XIXe siècle 1789-1914, Paris, Promodis-Cercle de la librairie, 1991
- P.-C.-F. Daunou, Notice historique sur la vie et les ouvrages de M. Van Praët, Paris, s.d. [1839]
- Nouvelle biographie française, vol. 40, Paris, 1862
- Louis Gabriel Michaud. "Joseph Van Praet". Biographie universelle ancienne et moderne : histoire par ordre alphabétique de la vie publique et privée de tous les hommes avec la collaboration de plus de 300 savants et littérateurs français ou étrangers (in French) (2 ed.).
- S. Balayé,La bibliothèque nationale des origines à 1800, Geneva, 1988
- J.-F. Foucaud, La bibliothèque royale sous la Monarchie de Juillet, Paris, 1978
