= Michael Mertes =

German chief officer and author (born 1953)

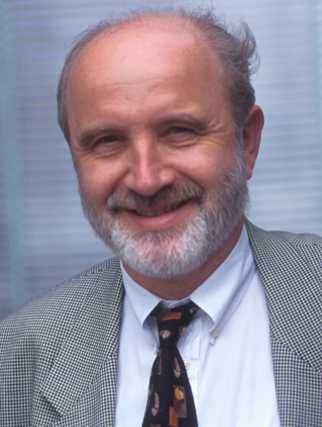
Michael Mertes, 1999

Michael Mertes (born 26 March 1953 in Bonn) is a German chief officer and author. He was a political advisor to Chancellor Helmut Kohl from 1987 to 1998, and he served in the State Government of North Rhine-Westphalia (NRW) as the state's representative to the German federal institutions and to the European Union from 2006 to 2010. From June 2011 to July 2014, he was Resident Representative of the Konrad Adenauer Foundation (KAS) to Israel in Jerusalem.

Mertes is married and has four children.

== Early life ==
As a son of a diplomat, Mertes spent most of his childhood and youth abroad (Marseille, Paris, Moscow). In 1972 he graduated from high school where he had majored in classical languages. After a two-year military service from 1972 to 1974 he studied law at Bonn and Tübingen universities as well as at the London School of Economics (with a focus on Public international law, Philosophy of Law, Philosophy of science). He completed his law degree at the beginning of 1981 and passed his bar exam in 1983.

== Career ==
In 1981 Mertes worked for Carl Otto Lenz MP as a parliamentary assistant. From 1984 to 1987, he held various positions in the federal administration (Federal Ministry of Defense, Federal Chancellery, Federal Ministry for the Environment, Nature Conservation and Nuclear Safety). In 1987 Chancellor Kohl appointed him as his chief speechwriter. After the fall of the Berlin Wall Mertes co-authored the „Ten Point Program for German and European Unity” which Kohl presented on 28 November 1989. In 1993 he became Director, Policy Planning, and in 1995 he was appointed Director-General, Policy Planning and Cultural Affairs at the Federal Chancellery.

After the change of government from Helmut Kohl to Gerhard Schröder in 1998, Mertes joined the editorial team of the German weekly Rheinischer Merkur and remained the newspaper's foreign editor and deputy editor-in-chief until the end of 2002. From 2003 to July 2006, he worked as an associate for the political consultancy “dimap consult” which he had co-founded with former colleagues. At the same time, he continued writing as a freelance author for “Rheinischer Merkur”, Aufbau (until 2004) and Project Syndicate.

In August 2006 Mertes was appointed State Secretary for Federal, European and International Affairs in the State Government of North Rhine-Westphalia (Düsseldorf). In that capacity, he was Plenipotentiary of North Rhine-Westphalia to the Federation (Berlin) and the State's representative to the European Union (Brussels). He left office in 2010 after the change of government from a CDU-led to an SPD-led State Government. In 2011 he became head of the Konrad Adenauer Foundation's Jerusalem office.

== Publications ==
Since the mid-1980s Mertes has continuously published articles and book chapters on European and international affairs, interreligious dialogue, and (comparative) government. The newspapers and journals to which he contributed include Frankfurter Allgemeine Zeitung, International Herald Tribune, Neue Zürcher Zeitung, The Independent and several dailys belonging the Project Syndicate, as well as Dædalus, Foreign Affairs, Internationale Politik, Neprikosnovenny Zapás (Неприкосновенный запас), Obshchaya Tetrad (Общая тетрадъ), Politique étrangère, Prospect, The Washington Quarterly, Transit, and the Israel Journal of Foreign Affairs. He co-authored and co-edited (with Steven Muller and Heinrich August Winkler) “In Search of Germany” (1996), and he is the author of “German Questions – European Answers” (2001). In 2022, he and Vincent Fröhlich published the essay “Der neue Konspirationismus” (The New Conspiracism), exploring how digital platforms and fan communities create and disseminate conspiracy narratives. Mertes also came out with a German translation of William Shakespeare's sonnets (2006), of selected love poetry, verse letters and religious poems by John Donne (2017), of a selection of sonnets from Petrarch to Gerard Manley Hopkins (2018), and of 50 sonnets by Luis de Góngora 2021.

In July 1989 he published, with his colleague Norbert J. Prill, a much-debated concept for a multi-speed Europe which was based on the idea that the European Community, considering the approaching end of the Cold War, should be prepared to include emerging new democracies from Eastern Europe and neutral countries such as Austria, Finland and Sweden; Mertes and Prill also pleaded for a stronger association of Israel and Turkey with the EC. During the 1990s Timothy Garton Ash, Michael Mertes and Dominique Moïsi wrote several „trilateral“ (British-German-French) pleas in favour of a combined eastward entlargement and institutional modernisation of the EU.

== Selected involvements ==
Mertes has been a member of the CDU since 1971, the Kuratorium der Freunde und Förderer des Leo Baeck Instituts e.V. since 1988, the International Advisory Council of the Moscow School of Civic Education since 2000, the International Board of Directors of the Institute for Human Sciences at Boston University 2001–2009, the Commission for Contemporary History since 2002, and the Drafting Committee for the CDU's new party platform (Grundsatzprogramm) 2006–2007. In 2006 he received, together with Rabbi Nathan Peter Levinson and Protestant Pastor Johannes Hildebrandt, the International Raoul Wallenberg Foundation's Roncalli Award for interfaith dialogue and understanding.

== Selected bibliography ==
=== Books ===
- In Search of Germany (with Steven Muller und Heinrich August Winkler). Transaction Publishers, New Brunswick and London 1996, ISBN 1-56000-880-6
- Немецкие вопросы – европейские ответы (German Questions – European Answers). Moscow School of Political Studies, Moscow 2001, ISBN 5-93895-017-1
- Du, meine Rose, bist das All für mich. Die Sonette von William Shakespeare ins Deutsche übertragen und kommentiert von Michael Mertes mit einem Nachwort von Arnold Stadler. Franz Schön, Bonn 2006, ISBN 978-3-9811154-0-6
- Schweig endlich still und lass mich lieben!. Ein John-Donne-Lesebuch. Verlag Franz Schön, Bonn 2017, ISBN 978-3-9816420-6-3
- experimenta sonettologica. Verlag Franz Schön, Bonn 2018, ISBN 978-3-9816420-9-4
- Gold und Lilie, Staub und Nacht. 50 Sonette von Luis de Góngora ins Deutsche übertragen von Michael Mertes. Verlag Franz Schön, Bonn 2021, ISBN 978-3-947837-03-8
- #Der neue Konspirationismus: Wie digitale Plattformen und Fangemeinschaften Verschwörungserzählungen schaffen und verbreiten (with Vincent Fröhlich). Büchner-Verlag, Marburg 2022, ISBN 978-3-96317-314-1
- Auf Schlingerkurs durch Wendezeiten. Polit-Sonette. Edition SIGNAThUR, Dozwil 2025, ISBN 978-3-906273-53-2

=== Book chapters and essays ===
- Germany’s Social and Political Culture: Change Through Consensus?. In: Dædalus 123, 1 (Winter 1994)
- Europe's Map, Compass and Horizon: Where? Why? With Whom? (with Dominique Moïsi). In: Foreign Affairs January/February 1995
- Les questions allemandes au XXe siècle: identité, démocratie, équilibre européen. In: Politique étrangère 3-4/2000
- What Distinguishes Europe? In: Krzysztof Michalski (Ed.): What Holds Europe Together?. Central European University Press, Budapest and New York 2006, ISBN 978-963-7326-47-9
- Eros und Religion bei John Donne. In: Stimmen der Zeit 3/2018
- Rising from the Ashes: The Holocaust and the European Integration Project. In: Sharon Pardo and Hila Zahavi (Ed.): The Jewish Contribution to European Integration. Lexington Books, Lanham MD 2019, ISBN 978-1-7936-0319-7
- Une initiative franco-allemande pour renforcer la souveraineté européenne (together with Philippe Étienne, Arndt Freytag von Loringhoven and Jean-Paul Tran Thiet), Les Echos March 5, 2025, p. 11.
