= List of presidents of Johns Hopkins University =

Fourteen presidents have led Johns Hopkins University since 1875.

== Presidents ==
The following persons have served as president of Johns Hopkins University:

Presidents of the university
No.	Image	President	Term start	Term end	Refs.
1		Daniel Coit Gilman	May 1875	August 1901	
2		Ira Remsen	September 1901	January 1913	
3		Frank Goodnow	October 1914	June 1929	
4		Joseph Sweetman Ames	July 1929	June 1935	
5		Isaiah Bowman	July 1935	December 1948	
6		Detlev Bronk (Note: Resigned to lead The Rockefeller Institute for Medical Research.)	January 1949	August 1953	
7		Lowell Reed	September 1953	June 1956	
8		Milton S. Eisenhower	July 1956	June 1967	
9		Lincoln Gordon	July 1967	March 1971	
interim		Milton S. Eisenhower	March 1971	January 1972	
10		Steven Muller	February 1972	June 30, 1990	
11		William C. Richardson	July 1, 1990	May 31, 1995 (Note: Resigned to lead the W.K. Kellogg Foundation.)	
interim		Daniel Nathans	June 1, 1995	August 31, 1996	
13		William R. Brody	September 1, 1996	March 1, 2009 (Note: Resigned to lead the Salk Institute.)	
14		Ronald J. Daniels	March 2, 2009	Present	

Table notes:
