= Thibault de Montbrial =

French lawyer (born 1968)

- Born: 1 September 1968 (age 56); Paris, France
- Occupation: Lawyer
- Parent(s): Thierry de Montbrial, Marie-Christine de Montbrial
- Website: thibaultdemontbrial.fr

Thibault de Montbrial (born 1 September 1968) is a French lawyer.

== Biography ==
He defended cyclist Bruno Roussel in the Festina affair. Most recently, he was involved in the Armstrong affair. He is the son of Thierry de Montbrial who directed the Center of Analysis and Prevision (CAP) of the French ministry of foreign affairs from 1973 to 1978 before Jean-Louis Gergorin, and of Marie-Christine de Montbrial.

== Career ==
He is the lawyer of Jean-Louis Gergorin, vice-président of EADS mentioned in the second Clearstream affair.

The Canard enchaîné of 10 May 2006 says he gave on 3 May 2004 to judge Renaud Van Ruymbeke the letter of Jean-Louis Gergorin speaking of a major international plot against EADS and of his actors owning accounts in Luxembourg bank called Clearstream credited with illegal money. It's the origin of the affair Clearstream 2 that stroke the government of Dominique de Villepin in May 2006. He also worked with Jean-Pierre Mignard, the lawyer of Ségolène Royal. Montbrial was hired as an arbitrator in a case against Lance Armstrong made by SCA Promotions. In 2004 the company refused to pay $5 million of $10 million won by Armstrong, citing rumors of performance-enhancing drugs. At the time, Montbrial was also representing defendants in a libel and slander suit brought on by Armstrong. Judge Adolph Canales disqualified Montbrial, citing conflict of interest and violation of the rules of the American Arbitration Association, which requires all arbitrators to be "impartial and independent."

== Bibliography ==
- Dallas Judge Agrees with Lance Armstrong in Legal Case announced by Herman Howry & Breen L.L.P. - Accessed 25 September 2005
- Montbrial Avocats (cabinet created by Thibault de Montbrial in 1998)
