= Policy Planning Staff =

Policy Planning Staff may refer to:

- Policy Planning Staff (United States), principal strategic arm of the United States Department of State
- Policy Planning Staff (France), known as Centre d'analyse, de prévision et de stratégie
