= Thierry de Montbrial =

French economist (born 1943)

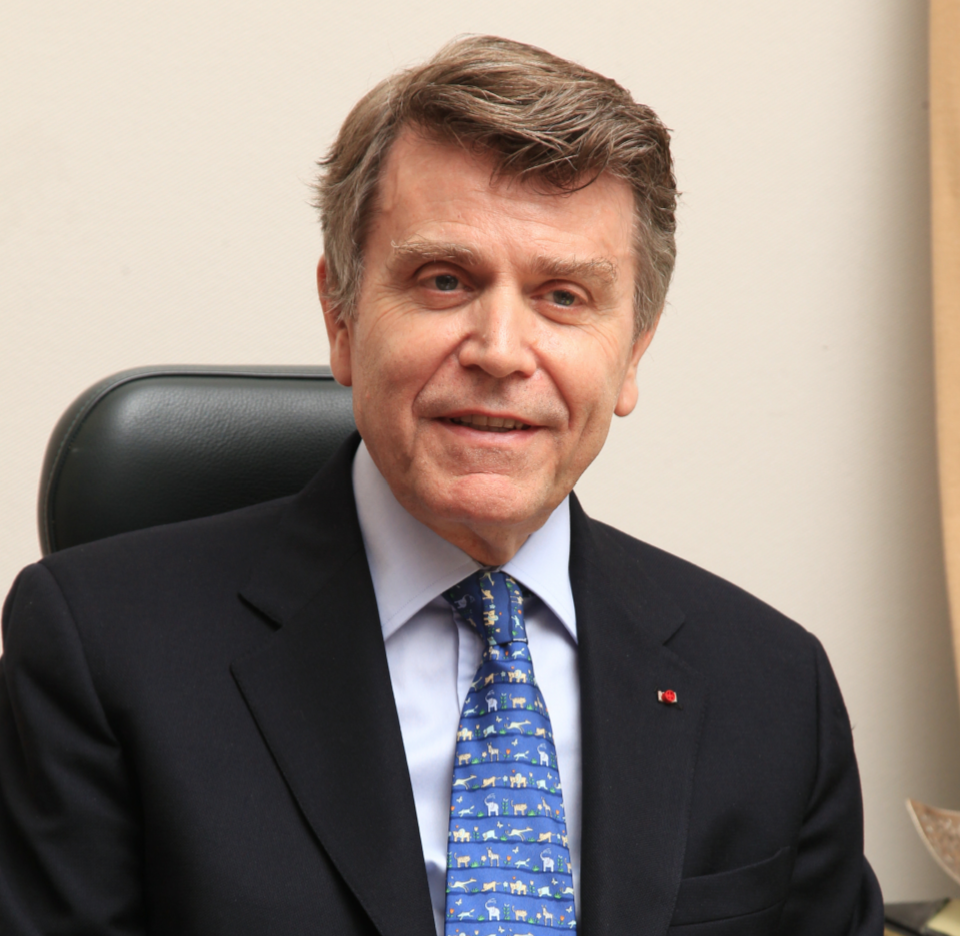
- Thierry de Montbrial in 2016
- Born: Thierry René Henri de Montbrial; 3 March 1943 (age 83); Paris, France
- Education: Ecole polytechnique, Corps des Mines, University of California, Berkeley
- Occupations: Founder and executive chairman of the Institut français des relations internationales, founder and chairman of the World Policy Conference
- Spouse: Marie-Christine de Montbrial (m. 1967)
- Children: Thibault de Montbrial, Alexandra Pilleux-de Montbrial
- Website: www.thierrydemontbrial.com/en/

Thierry René Henri de Montbrial (French pronunciation: [tjɛʁi d(ə) mɔ̃bʁijal]; born 3 March 1943) is the executive chairman of the French Institute of International Relations (IFRI), which he founded in 1979. He is also the founder and chairman of the World Policy Conference (WPC), which he created in 2008. He has been a member of the French Academy of Moral and Political Sciences since 1992. He is an honorary member of numerous foreign academies.

== Biography ==
Montbrial is the son of François, inspector-general of the Bank of France and Monique Lecuyer-Corthis. He married Marie-Christine de Montbrial (née Balling) in 1967, who is a movie producer (StarDance Pictures) and daughter of Charles Balling (born in 1912; graduate from the École polytechnique in 1935). He is the father of lawyer Thibault de Montbrial and Alexandra Pilleux-de Montbrial.

=== Education ===
Montbrial graduated from the École polytechnique (1963) and from the École des Mines (1969) as a general engineer. He received his doctorate in Economics from the University of California, Berkeley in the United States. He wrote his doctoral thesis at Berkeley on the time dimension in the economic theory of general equilibrium, directed by the professor Gérard Debreu (Nobel Prize of Economy, 1983).

=== Career ===
As a Corps des Mines engineer, de Montbrial chaired the department of Economics of the École polytechnique between 1974 and 1992. He was a professor at the Ecole polytechnique (1973–2008) and also chaired the department of Applied Economics and International Relations at the Conservatoire national des arts et métiers (CNAM) between 1995 and 2008. Since then, he has been a Professor Emeritus at the Conservatoire National des Arts et Métiers.

In 1973, Michel Jobert, then Minister of Foreign Affairs of France, put him in charge of setting up the Center of Analysis and Prevision (CAP) for the Ministry of Foreign Affairs. He then became the first Head Director of the Policy Planning Staff until 1979, prior to Jean-Louis Gergorin.

In 1979, de Montbrial created the French Institute of Foreign Relations (Ifri), which publishes – among others – the annual report RAMSES (yearly global report on the economic system and strategies) and the periodical Politique étrangère (foreign policy).

In 2008, Montbrial founded the World Policy Conference (WPC), an annual meeting which addresses global governance issues and which gathers political, economic and social leaders.

de Montbrial was also chairman of the French-Austrian Centre for European Economic Convergence (CFA) between 1985 and 2015. Between 1993 and 2001, he was the inaugural chairman of the Foundation for Strategic Research. He is a regular contributor to the media, and was notably a columnist for the daily Le Monde (2002–2010), after being a columnist for Le Figaro (1989–2001).

de Montbrial is on the boards of several institutions and international companies. He is – among others – member of the international advisory board of Lafarge and chairman of the international advisory board of the Group OCP (Morocco), and member of the board of directors of the Renault Foundation. He was a member of the advisory council of the WTO secretary general, Geneva (2003–2005), member of the Commission Defense and National Security White Paper (2007–2008) and member of the Steering Committee for the Bilderberg Meetings (1976–2011).

de Montbrial is a member of the advisory committee of the Peterson Institute for International Economics (Washington), the Carnegie Moscow Center, the advisory council of the Stanford Institute for International Studies and the editorial board of Russia in Global Affairs (Moscow). He is also a member of the Fondation Ecologie d'Avenir since 2011.

== Academies ==
de Montbrial was elected at the French Academy of Moral and Political Sciences on 29 June 1992. He was Chairman of this academy in 2001 and of the Institut de France at the same time. He is a founding member of the Académie des Technologies (2000). He is also a member of the Academia Europaea (elected in March 1993), the Royal Academy of Belgium (elected in January 1996), the Swedish Royal Academy of Engineering Sciences (elected in 1999), the Romanian Academy (elected in December 1999), the Academy of Science of Russia (elected in May 2003), the Academy of Science of Moldavia (elected in January 2006), the Academy of Science of Bulgaria (elected in July 2006) and in 2010 was accepted as corresponding academician in the Royal Academy of Economics and Financial Sciences of Spain.

de Montbrial is Doctor Honoris Causa of the Romanian Academy for economic studies (1996), the Academy of Science of Azerbaidjan (2002), the University of Brasov, Romania (2003), the University of Galatasaray, Turkey (2004), the State University of Chisinau, Moldavia (2005), the State Institute of International Relations (MGIMO) of Moscow (2007), the University of Bucarest, Romania (2011), Iasi, Romania (2014) and of Sofia University, Bulgaria (2017).

== Distinctions and honours ==
- Grand Officier of the Légion d'honneur (France, 2019)
- Grand Officier of the Ordre national du Mérite (France, 2011)
- Commandeur of the Ordre des Palmes académiques (France, 2003)
- Commandeur of the Ordre des Arts et des Lettres (France, 2023)
- Commandeur of the Ordre du Mérite agricole (France)
- Grand Decoration of Honour in Gold of the Decoration of Honour for Services to the Republic of Austria (Austria)
- Officier of the Order of the Crown (Belgium)
- Commandeur of the Order of the Southern Cross (Brazil)
- Commandeur of the Order of Merit of the Federal Republic of Germany
- Commander's Cross with Star of the Order of Merit of the Republic of Poland (Poland)
- Grand Officier of the Order of the Star of Romania
- Awarded Grand Prix of the Société de Géographie for his collected works (2003).

== Bibliography ==
- L'ère des affrontements. Les grands tournants géopolitiques, Dunod, 2025
- Histoire de mon temps, Académie roumaine, Fondation nationale pour la science et les arts, Bucarest, 2018
- Vivre le temps des troubles, Albin Michel, 2017. English translation Living in Troubled Times, a New Political Era, World Scientific, 2018, and in Bulgarian, édition Académie bulgare des Sciences, 2019.
- Notre intérêt national, (dir. avec T. Gomart), Odile Jacob, 2017
- La pensée et l’action, Académie roumaine, Fondation nationale pour la science et les arts, Bucarest, 2016
- Une goutte d'eau et l'océan - Journal d'une quête de sens, Albin Michel, 2015
- My Romanian Journal, Editura RAO, 2012 (Bilingual edition: in Romanian and French)
- Journal de Russie – 1977 - 2011, 2012
- Vingt ans qui bouleversèrent le monde, édition Dunod, 2008
- Violence : de la psychologie à la politique, (dir. avec S. Jansen), Fondation Singer Polignac, Bruylant, Bruxelles, 2007
- Il est nécessaire d'espérer pour entreprendre, édition des Syrtes, 2006
- Géographie politique, collection "Que Sais-je ?", PUF, 2006
- L’Identité de la France et l’Europe, (dir. avec S. Jansen), Fondation Singer Polignac, Bruylant, Bruxelles, 2005
- La guerre et la diversité du monde, L'Aube - Le Monde, 2004
- Pratiques de la négociation (dir., avec S. Jansen), Bruylant/LGDG, 2004
- Quinze ans qui bouleversèrent le monde, Dunod, October 2003
- Réformes-révolutions - Le cas de la France (dir.), PUF, 2003
- L'action et le système du monde, PUF, February 2002, 2nd edition, collection "Quadrige", October 2003, couronné par le prix Georges Pompidou
- La France du nouveau siècle (dir.), PUF, February 2002
- Dictionnaire de Stratégie (co-directeur avec Jean Klein), PUF, November 2000
- Pour combattre les pensées uniques, Flammarion, 2000
- Introduction à l’économie, Dunod, 1999, 2nd ed. 2002
- Mémoire du temps présent, Flammarion, 1996, awarded the Prix des Ambassadeurs
- Que Faire ? Les grandes manoeuvres du monde, La Manufacture, 1990
- La science économique ou la stratégie des rapports de l'homme vis-à-vis des ressources rares : méthodes et modèles, PUF, 1988
- La revanche de l'Histoire, Julliard, 1985
- L'Energie : le compte à rebours, J.CL. Lattès, 1978
- Le Désordre économique mondial, Calmann-Lévy, 1974
- Essais d'économie parétienne, Ed. CNRS, 1974
- Economie théorique, PUF, 1971

== See also ==
- Institut français des relations internationales (IFRI)
- World Policy Conference (WPC)
