= Politique étrangère =

Politique étrangère is the oldest French journal dedicated to the study of international relations. Created in 1936 by the French Council on Foreign Relations, this quarterly was taken over and published by the Institut français des relations internationales — French Institute for International Relations — when it was founded in 1979.

Open to world debates, Politique étrangère is the first distributor of French analysis for foreign countries. Politique étrangère is a long-term reference for academics, opinion leaders and members of civil society. It aims at highlighting all the key elements as to foreign affairs and offering deep analyses of today's international context.

Each edition offers at least two dossiers about an event or an aspect of the international debate, as well as several articles deciphering the emerging issues. Politique étrangère also places great interest in the latest French and foreign publications dealing with international relations.

Among those who have written articles for Politique étrangère are Raymond Aron, André Beaufre, Jacques Berque, Henry Kissinger, Claude Lévi-Strauss, Louis Massignon and Jean-Paul Sartre.

== Editorial staff ==
- Director of publication: Thierry de Montbrial
- Editors-in-Chief: Dominique David, Marc Hecker
- Editorial board: Denis Bauchard, Bernard Cazes, Etienne de Durand, Thomas Gomart, Jolyon Howorth, Ethan Kapstein, Jean Klein, Jacques Mistral, Khadija Mohsen-Finan, Dominique Moïsi, Philippe Moreau Defarges, Eliane Mossé, Françoise Nicolas, Valérie Niquet, Hans Stark
- Scientific Committee: Thierry de Montbrial, Hélène Carrère d’Encausse, Jean-Claude Casanova, Dominique Chevallier, Gérard Conac, Jean-Luc Domenach, Jean-Marie Guéhenno, François Heisbourg, Jacques Lesourne, Jean-Pierre Rioux, Pierre Rosanvallon, Olivier Roy, Jacques Rupnik, Georges-Henri Soutou, Maurice Vaïsse, Alain Vernay
