= Diana Pinto =

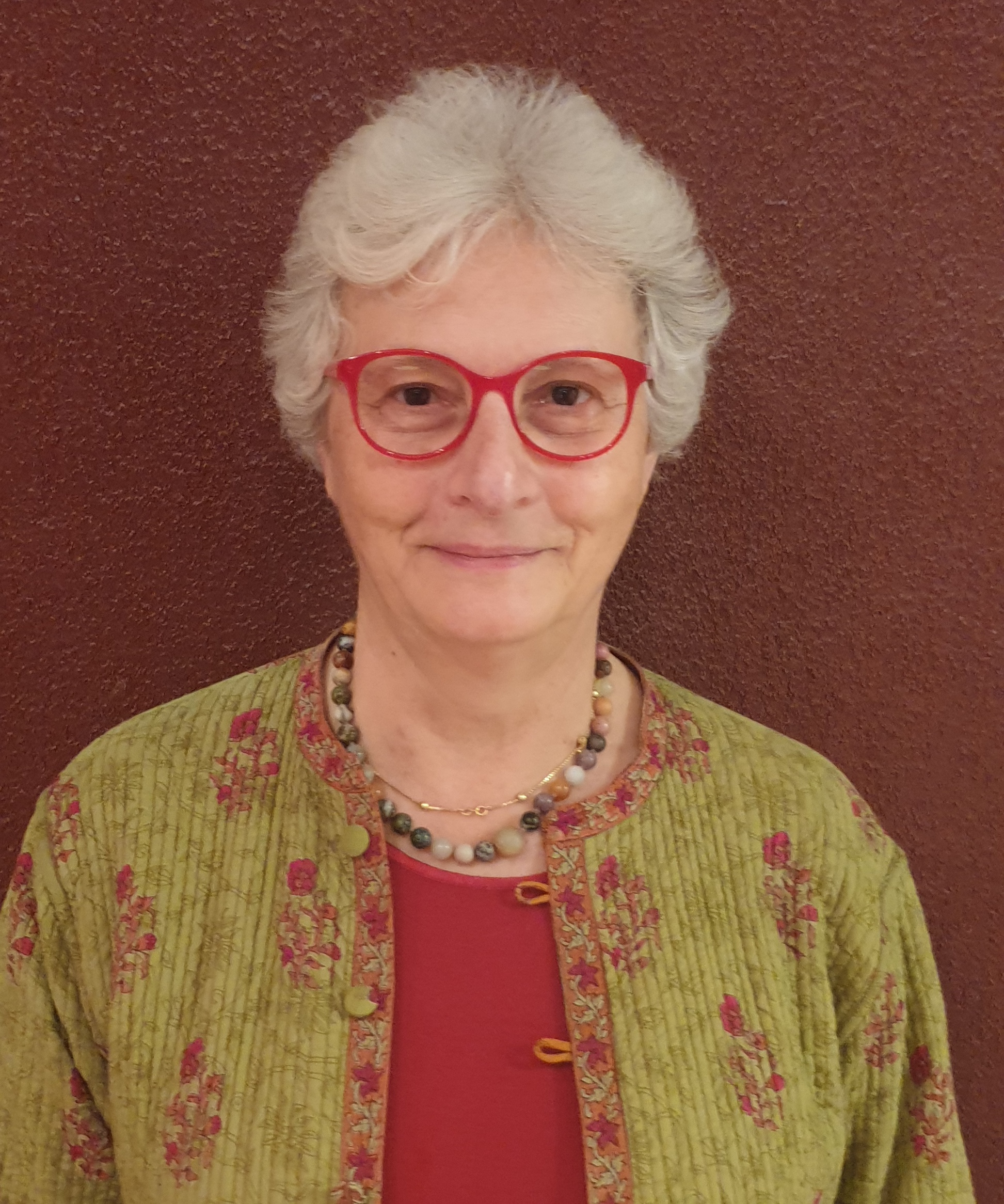
Pinto in 2019

Diana Pinto (born 1949) is an intellectual historian and writer living in Paris.

The daughter of Italian Jewish parents, she is married to the French political scientist Dominique Moïsi and a resident of France.

== Life ==
She was educated in the United States and is a graduate of Harvard University where she obtained her PhD in Contemporary European History.

After the fall of the Berlin Wall, she became the editor-in-chief of Belvédère, France's first pan-European review for a general public. She also worked as a Consultant to the Political Directorate of the Strasbourg-based Council of Europe for its civil society programmes in Eastern Europe and the former Soviet Union.

She has been a Fulbright Fellow, a Fellow of the American Council of Learned Societies, of Collegium Budapest in Hungary and of the Einstein Forum in Potsdam. She is a founder member of the European Council on Foreign Relations.

As a Senior Fellow and a board member of the London-based Institute for Jewish Policy Research she has been working on a project of "Jewish voices for the European res publica".

== Publications ==
Amongst others, Diana Pinto published a reader on Contemporary Italian Sociology (1981) and the autobiographical book Entre deux mondes (Between two worlds, 1991). She has lectured widely on transatlantic issues and on Jewish life in contemporary Europe as a crucial chapter in the continent's pluralist challenges. Her articles have been published across Eastern and Western Europe.

In 1996 she published an internationally debated policy paper on A new Jewish identity for post-1989 Europe, claiming that post-Cold War Europe could be turned "into the third pillar of a world Jewish identity at the cross-roads of a newly interpreted past, and a pluralist and democratic future".

In 2013, Harvard University Press published Pinto's psychological, symbolic portrait of "postmodern" Israeli society, Israel Has Moved.

== Partial bibliography ==
- Contemporary Italian Sociology. A Reader. Cambridge University Press, Cambridge 1981, ISBN 0-521-23738-6
- Entre deux mondes. Édition Odile Jacob, Paris 1991, ISBN 2-7381-0132-1
- The great European sea change. Dædalus 121, 4 (1992), 129–150.
- Israël a déménagé. Editions Stock, Paris 2012, ISBN 978-2-234-07321-0
- The Jewish World’s Ambiguous Attitude toward European Integration. In: Sharon Pardo and Hila Zahavi (Ed.): The Jewish Contribution to European Integration. Lexington Books, Lanham MD 2019, ISBN 978-1-7936-0319-7
