= Jean de Maillard =

French magistrate in Blois (born 1951)

Jean de Maillard (born 15 August 1951 in Saint-Germain-en-Laye, Yvelines) is a French magistrate in Blois.

He wrote several books concerning financial crime. He also co-signed a 9 May 2001 op-ed in Le Monde with Bernard Bertossa, attorney general in Geneva, Benoît Dejemeppe, king's attorney in Bruxelles (procureur du roi), Eva Joly, investigative magistrate in Paris, and Renaud van Ruymbeke, judge in Paris, entitled The 'black boxes' of financial globalization, that supported reporter Denis Robert in his investigations concerning the Clearstream Affair.

== Biography ==
After serving as a Inspection du travail, he joined the judiciary on 21 December 1983.

He has been Vice-President of the Paris Tribunal de Grande Instance since January 2011. Since the early 1990s, his research has focused on the effects of Globalization on the formation of social bonds, notably through the study of criminal forms. His research focuses on "new threats", Organized crime and Financial crime, and security policies. He teaches at Sciences Po, as part of the "International Security" Master's program at the Paris School of International Affairs, specializing in "Intelligence". His course, co-taught with Olivier Chopin, is entitled "Contrôle, surveillance, sécurité face aux nouvelles menaces". He received the Grand Prix Moron (philosophy) from the Académie Française in 1995 for his book "Crimes et lois". His book, "Un monde sans loi. La criminalité financière en images" is a reference work on money laundering. He is a member of the Observatoire géopolitique des criminalités (OGC) and a contributor to the Rue89 website.

== Books ==
- (in French) Les beaux jours du crime. Vers une société criminelle ? Plon, 1992.
- (in French) Un monde sans loi. La criminalité financière en images. Editions Stock, 1999.
