= Carlos Jiménez Villarejo =

Spanish politician (born 1935)

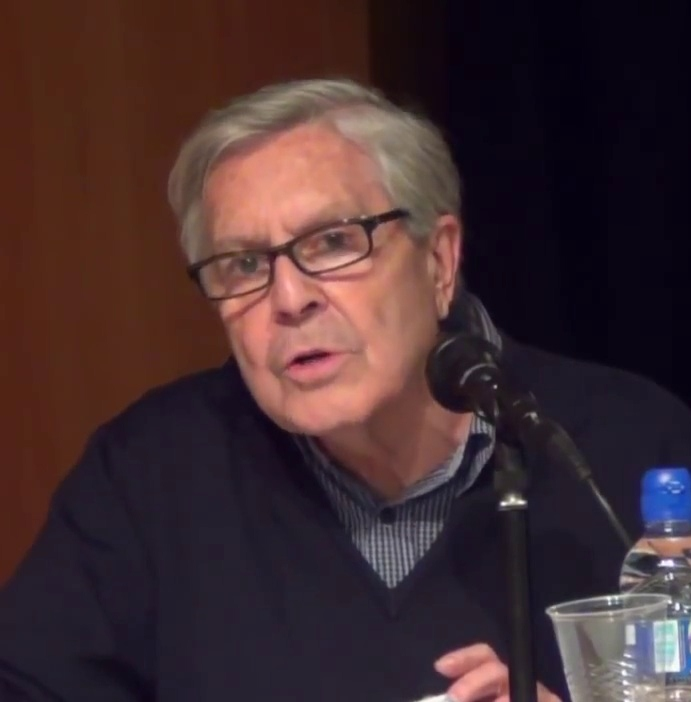
- Villarejo in 2014
- Born: 1935 (88 or 89 years old); Málaga
- Occupation: Prosecutor
- Political party: Podemos

Carlos Jiménez Villarejo (born 1935 in Málaga) is a former Spanish anti-corruption public prosecutor in office between 2000 and 2004. He is specialized in fighting against tax havens. He collaborates with ATTAC's struggle to abolish money-laundering centers.

In 2014 he briefly represented Podemos in the European Parliament. He stopped working with Podemos in 2016.

== Bibliography ==
- (in French) Denis Robert, La justice ou le chaos, Stock, 1996. Interviews and portrait of seven anticorruption judges: Bernard Bertossa, Edmondo Bruti Liberati, Gherardo Colombo, Benoît Dejemeppe, Baltasar Garzon Real, Carlos Jimenez Villarejo, Renaud Van Ruymbeke
