= 2012 Eva Joly presidential campaign =

French Presidential campaign

Eva Joly 2012
- Campaign: Presidential election, 2012
- Candidate: Eva Joly
- Affiliation: Europe Écologie-The Greens
- Key people: Daniel Cohn-Bendit; Noël Mamère; Cécile Duflot
- Slogan: "Le vote juste" (The right vote)

Website
- evajoly2012.fr

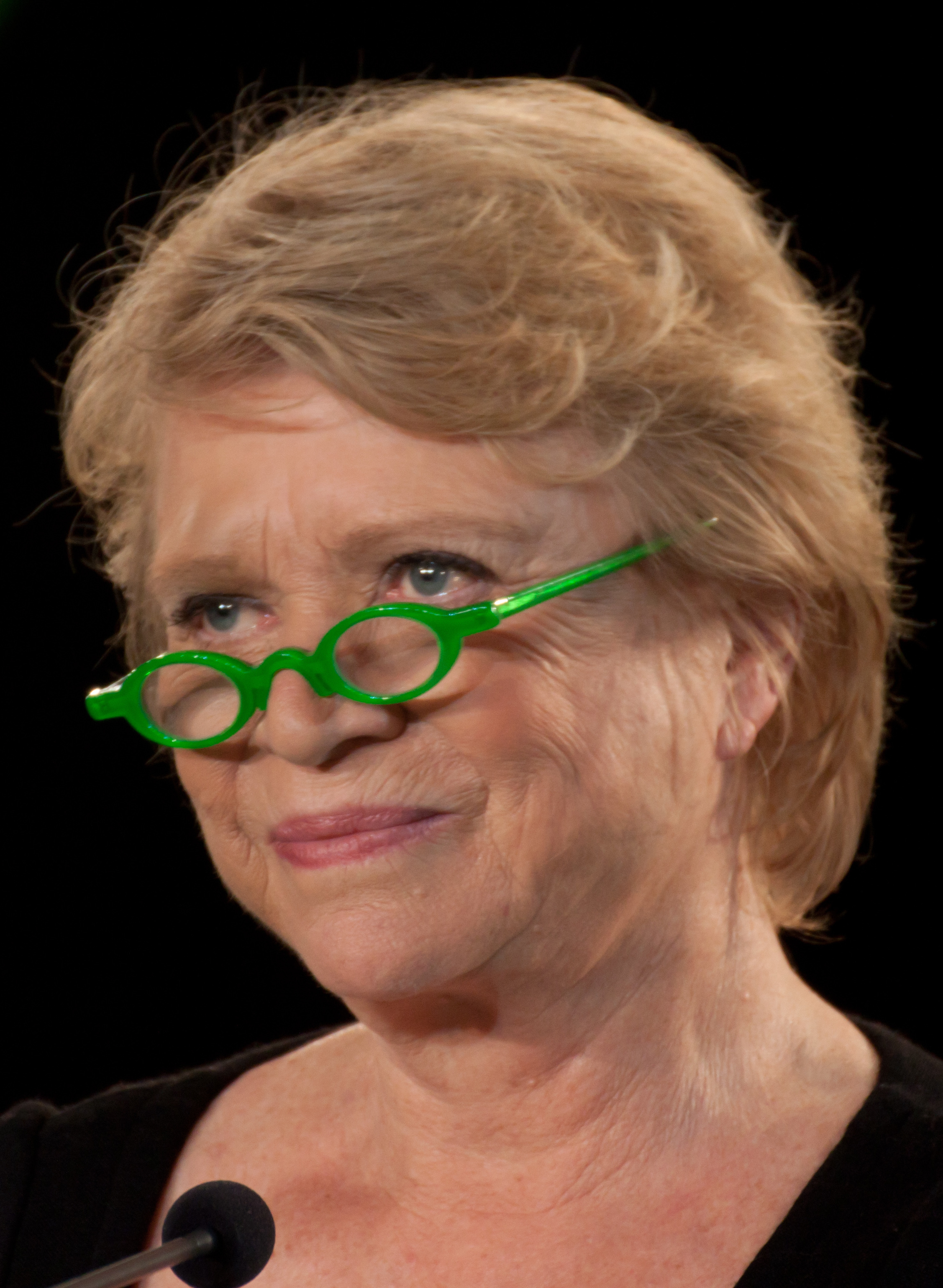
Joly campaigning

French Member of the European Parliament Eva Joly began a campaign for the French Ecologist presidential primary for President of France in May 2011. Eva Joly announced she was running for president in August 2010. On 29 June 2011 she won the ecologist nomination with 58.16% of the votes over the TV presenter Nicolas Hulot after a disputed campaign. At the first round of the presidential election, she received 2.3% of the vote, and subsequently endorsed Socialist Party candidate François Hollande for the second round. Her main campaign promises revolved around ending nuclear power within 20 years and creating a million eco-jobs.

== Political platform ==
- Fight against corruption, banking secrecy and tax havens.
- 30% of reduction of the emissions of greenhouse gases in 2020; stop all nuclear plants in 20 years; produce 40% of electricity with renewables energies by 2020; renovate 1 million homes a year in 2020; invest 4 billion euros a year on the train and public transports.
- Launch an education plan to nature, restore nature, limit the creation of artificial environments, changing the hunting regulations.
- Stop GMOs, the exploitation of shale gas and the building of new highways, abandonment of major projects, close the incinerators.

== Polls ==
After the ecologist primary, in July, she had about 6% of the votes but since March, she is about 3% of the votes.

== See also ==
- 2012 French presidential election
