= World Policy Conference =

World Policy Conference (WPC)
- Formation: 2008
- Type: Annual conference on global governance
- Official language: French, English
- Founder and President: Thierry de Montbrial
- Website: www.worldpolicyconference.com

The World Policy Conference (WPC) is an independent organization whose aim is to contribute to improving all aspects of governance, with a view to promoting a world that is more open, prosperous, fairer and more respectful of the diversity of States and nations. It was launched in 2008, by Thierry de Montbrial, chairman and founder of the French Institute of International Relations (Ifri).

This annual conference revolves around debates gathering economic and political leaders, diplomats, representatives of civil society, experts and journalists from all over the world. It aims at reflecting, debating, and offering constructive solutions to major regional and international issues, in an atmosphere of respect and tolerance.

In 2017, the World Policy Conference ranked 3rd best Think Tank Conference according to The Think Tanks and Civil Societies Program (TTCSP) at the Lauder Institute, University of Pennsylvania '2017 Global Go To Think Tank Index Report'.

== History ==
Launched in 2008 by Thierry de Montbrial, the chairman and founder of the French Institute of International Relations (Ifri), the World Policy Conference (WPC) is the first effort to foster systematic reflection on organizing global governance tailored to 21st century realities, bringing together the highest-level decision-makers, experts and opinion leaders.

The first edition of the conference took place in Evian (France), from October 6-8, 2008.

== The foundations of the WPC ==
The World Policy Conference (WPC) was founded on three complementary ideas:

- The nature of globalisation

The World Policy Conference falls within a context where globalisation and interconnections between countries have never been stronger, whether it is on a political, economic or environmental level. During its first edition in 2008, the conference has addressed the subprime crisis, which had just broken out in the United States and has spared no continents since then.

- International relations are still centered on relations between states

Despite phenomena of globalisation, the world is still organized around political entities, States. They are characterized by a territory, a population and a government. They also share common culture, values, institutions, and have delimited borders.

- The construction of the new international system – or rather of its governance – is not just a matter for states

In order to ensure good global governance, states must reform and cooperate. However, they cannot be the only ones to work to that end. NGOs and think tanks, including the French Institute of International Relations (Ifri), have to take part in this process as well. Each member should be able to express his point of view and influence the choices made via a proper decision-making process. Finally, global institutions (UN), as well as regional (African Union, Arab League) and specialized institutions (IMF, World Bank, International Energy Agency, World Health Organization) have to adjust to the new global order and find adequate solutions.

=== Print publications ===
A report is published after each WPC conference. This report contains the most noteworthy excerpts from the presentations and the profiles of all the participants, as well as a description of all the WPC's partners. Each conference's highlights are illustrated with a large number of images. Thousands of copies of this bilingual (French-English) publication are distributed worldwide every year. The report can also be downloaded in PDF format from the WPC website.

=== Digital media ===
The WPC website provides access not only to all past conferences but also to the latest information on the forthcoming conference.

- WPC TV: WPC TV provides access to interviews with and statements by the participants in the conference.
- Conference proceedings: The proceedings of each conference are published online, with all presentations entirely available in video and text formats.

=== Social networks and sharing ===
The WPC can be followed on Twitter, LinkedIn, Facebook, Instagram and Flickr. Moreover, the whole intellectual content of the event is saved in video format and is available on YouTube.

== Guests ==
Each year, the World Policy Conference gathers political, economic and social leaders: Heads of States and governments, ministers, members of parliaments, ambassadors, CEOs, experts, journalists and NGOs’ members.

Among distinguished guests, one can quote:

- Patrick Achi (Prime Minister of Ivory Coast)
- Masood Ahmed (director of the IMF’s Middle East and Central Asia Department)
- Martti Ahtisaari (former president of the Republic of Finland)
- Khalid Bin Mohammed Al Attiyah (then Minister of Foreign Affairs of the State of Qatar)
- Sheikh Abdullah bin Naser bin Khalifa Al-Thani (Prime Minister of the State of Qatar)
- H.R.H. Prince Turki Al-Faisal (President of King Faisal Center for Research and Islamic Studies)
- Yukiya Amano (Director General of the International Atomic Energy Agency)
- Youssef Amrani (royal cabinet, Morocco)
- Yutaka Aso (President of Aso Group)
- Jean-Marc Ayrault (Minister of Foreign Affairs and International Development, France)
- Robert Badinter (former Minister of Justice, Keeper of the Seals, France)
- Bertrand Badré (then director-general and chief financial officer of the World Bank Group)
- Ban Ki-moon (Secretary-General of the United Nations)
- Ehud Barak (Former prime minister of Israel)
- Sébastien Bazin (chairman and CEO, AccorHotels)
- Marek Belka (president of the National Bank of Poland)
- Charles-Edouard Bouée (CEO, Roland Berger Strategy Consultants)
- Nasser Bourita (minister of foreign affairs and international cooperation)
- Ana Brnabić (Prime Minister of Serbia)
- Christian Bréchot (president of the Pasteur Institute)
- Didier Burkhalter (federal councilor, chief of the federal Department of Foreign Affairs (DFAE), Switzerland)
- Korn Chatikavanij (former minister of finances of Thailand)
- Chey Tae-Won (chairman, SK Group, Republic of Korea)
- Nelson Cunningham (president, McLarty Associates)
- José Angel Cordova Villalobos ( then Minister of Health, Mexico)
- Amadou Gon Coulibaly (then prime minister of Ivory Coast)
- Ahmet Davutoglu (former prime minister of Turkey)
- Kemal Dervis (vice-president of the Brookings Institution, Head of the Global Economy Department)
- Bozidar Djelic (Managing Director, in charge of Central and Eastern Europe, Lazard)
- Saeb Erekat (Palestinian chief negotiator, Palestine)
- Heinz Fischer (President of the Republic of Austria)
- Fu Ying (then Deputy Minister of Foreign Affairs of the Popular Republic of China)
- Cheikh Tidiane Gadio (President of IPS, former Foreign Minister of Senegal)
- Robert Gates (Former United States Secretary of Defense)
- Elisabeth Guigou (President of the French Commission of Foreign Affairs, French National Assembly)
- Abdullah Gül (then president of the Republic of Turkey)
- Angel Gurría (Secretary-General of the OECD)
- Richard Haass (President of Council on Foreign Relations (CFR))
- Han Seung-soo (Former prime minister of the Republic of Korea)
- Riad Hijab (former prime minister, Syria)
- Maria van der Hoeven (then executive director of the International Energy Agency)
- Jaap de Hoop Scheffer (then secretary-general of NATO)
- Mo Ibrahim (founder and president, Mo Ibrahim Foundation)
- Toomas Hendrik Ilves (President of the Republic of Estonia)
- Mugur Isarescu (governor of the National Bank of Romania)
- Vuk Jeremic (President of the Center for International Relations and Sustainable Development (CIRSD))
- Paul Kagame (President of Rwanda)
- John Kerr (Member of the House of Lords)
- Mari Kiviniemi (OECD Deputy Secretary-General)
- Haïm Korsia (Chief Rabbi of France)
- Haruhiko Kuroda (Governor of the Central Bank of Japan)
- Bruno Lafont (co-chairman, LafargeHolcim)
- Pascal Lamy (former director-general of the WTO)
- John Lipsky (Senior Fellow, Foreign Policy Institute, Johns Hopkins University’s Paul H. Nitze School of Advanced International Studies (SAIS))
- Pauline Marois (then premier of Quebec)
- Peter Maurer (President of the International Committee of the Red Cross)
- Dmitri Medvedev (then president of the Russian Federation)
- H.S.H. Prince Albert II (Prince of the Principality of Monaco)
- Mario Monti (former president of the Council of Ministers of the Italian Republic)
- Miguel Angel Moratinos (Former Minister of Foreign Affairs of Spain)
- Igor V. Morgulov (Deputy Minister of Foreign Affairs of the Russian Federation)
- Amr Moussa (then Secretary-General of the League of Arab States)
- Joseph Nye (Professor at the Kennedy School of Government, Harvard University)
- Raila Amolo Odinga (then prime minister of Kenya)
- Arkebe Oqubay (Minister and Prime Minister Advisor of Ethiopia)
- Patrick Pouyanné (CEO and chairman of the executive committee, Total)
- Alassane Ouattara (President of the Republic of Ivory Coast)
- Park Geun-Hye (President of the Republic of Korea)
- Edi Rama (Prime Minister of Albania)
- Guillaume Pepy (chairman of SNCF's Executive Board and chairman and CEO of SNCF Mobilités)
- Didier Reynders (Vice-Prime Minister and Minister of Foreign and European Affairs of Belgium)
- Mary Robinson (Former president of the Republic of Ireland)
- Louise Mushikiwabo (Secretary-General of the International Organisation of La Francophonie)
- Norbert Röttgen (Chairman of the Foreign Affairs Committee, Bundestag, Germany)
- Kevin Rudd (President of the Asia Society Policy Institute in New York City, Australia’s 26th Prime Minister)
- Jin Roy Ryu (CEO of Poongsan Group)
- Nicolas Sarkozy (then President of the French Republic)
- Boris Tadic (then President of the Republic of Serbia)
- Nobuo Tanaka (former Executive Director the International Energy Agency)
- Mostafa Terrab (CEO, OCP)
- Jean-Claude Trichet (Former President of the ECB)
- Hubert Védrine (Former French Minister of Foreign Affairs)
- Wang Jisi (President of the Institute of International and Strategic Studies, Peking University)
- Lionel Zinsou (Former Prime Minister of Benin)

== Editions of the WPC ==
The World Policy Conference usually takes place at the end of the year.

Below, a chart summing up the different WPC editions

Edition	Venue	Dates
1st edition	Évian-les-Bains, France	October 6–8, 2008
2nd edition	Marrakesh, Morocco	October 30 – November 1, 2009
3rd edition	Marrakesh, Morocco	October 15–18, 2010
4th edition	Vienna, Austria	December 9–11, 2011
5th edition	Cannes, France	December 7–10, 2012
6th edition	Monaco	December 13–15, 2013
7th edition	Seoul, South Korea	December 8–10, 2014
8th edition	Montreux, Switzerland	November 20–22, 2015
9th edition	Doha, Qatar	November 20–22, 2016
10th edition	Marrakesh, Morocco	November 3–5, 2017
11th edition	Rabat, Morocco	October 26–28, 2018
12th edition	Marrakesh, Morocco	October 12–14, 2019
13th edition		Not held
14th edition	Abu Dhabi, United Arab Emirates	October 1–3, 2021

== See also ==
- Berlin Global Dialogue
- Thierry de Montbrial
- French Institute of International Relations
