= Steven Everts =

Dutch political scientist and EU official

Director of the European Union Institute for Security Studies
- Incumbent
- Assumed office 1 September 2023
- High Representative: Josep Borrell; Kaja Kallas
- Preceded by: Gustav Lindstrom

Personal details
- Born: 1970 (age 55–56) Netherlands
- Citizenship: Netherlands
- Education: Leiden University (MA); St Antony's College, Oxford (DPhil)
- Profession: Political scientist European civil servant
- Known for: EU foreign, security and defence policy analysis

Steven Everts (born c. 1970) is a Dutch political scientist and European civil servant who has served as Director of the European Union Institute for Security Studies (EUISS) since September 2023.

Everts began his career as an academic at the University of Oxford before working as a policy analyst at the London-based Centre for European Reform (CER), where he directed the transatlantic programme from 1999 to 2004. He subsequently spent almost two decades in EU institutions, serving as Personal Representative for Energy and Foreign Policy to High Representative Javier Solana, as a member of the cabinet of High Representative Catherine Ashton and latterly as Senior Adviser on strategy and communications at the European External Action Service (EEAS).

As EUISS Director he has been a frequent commentator on European strategic autonomy, transatlantic relations under the second Trump administration, deterrence of Russia and the EU's relationship with China.

== Early life and education ==
Everts is a Dutch national. He studied at the Institut d'études politiques de Grenoble in 1988-1989 and obtained an MA in political science from the Faculty of Social Sciences at Leiden University in 1994. As a Chevening Scholar between 1994 and 1997, he undertook doctoral research at the University of Oxford, completing a DPhil in international relations at St Antony's College in 2000.

In addition to Dutch, he speaks English, French and Italian.

== Career ==
=== Academic and think tank work ===
Between 1996 and 1998, Everts held a lectureship in politics at Brasenose College, Oxford, and in 1997 he also tutored for the university's Department for Continuing Education. In 1998 he was a research associate at the Netherlands Institute of International Relations 'Clingendael'.

Everts joined the Centre for European Reform in April 1999 and became a senior research fellow and director of its transatlantic programme, a portfolio covering foreign and security policy, trade and economic cooperation between Europe and the United States. His 1999-2000 Survival article on transatlantic divergence over non-proliferation policy was cited by Robert Kagan in the essay 'Power and Weakness'.

At the CER he wrote the 2002 pamphlet Shaping a Credible EU Foreign Policy, which set out five rules for reform of the Common Foreign and Security Policy, including streamlining decision-making, strengthening the resources of the High Representative and setting and maintaining a small number of priorities. He also published on EU policy towards Iran and the Middle East and co-authored the 2004 report A European Way of War with Lawrence Freedman, Charles Grant, François Heisbourg, Daniel Keohane and Michael O'Hanlon, which argued that Europeans should build a distinctive military approach around peacekeeping, nation-building and counter-insurgency rather than emulating US forces.

=== Council of the European Union (2005-2009) ===
From 2005 to 2009 Everts worked for Secretary-General/High Representative Javier Solana at the General Secretariat of the Council of the European Union, both as a member of his cabinet and as his Personal Representative for Energy and Foreign Policy - one of a small number of horizontal portfolios for which Solana appointed personal representatives. He subsequently worked on EU relations with the United States, Canada and the United Nations.

=== European External Action Service (2010-2023) ===
Everts served as a member of the cabinet of High Representative Catherine Ashton until November 2012, with responsibility for Asia and the Pacific, Turkey and the framing of the EU's relations with its strategic partners.

He then moved to the Asia-Pacific department of the European External Action Service as a senior adviser, acting as the alternate EU Senior Official for the Asia-Europe Meeting (ASEM) process and working on the organisation of the ASEM12 summit held in Brussels in 2018. From November 2016 he was the EU's Governor on the board of the Asia-Europe Foundation, chairing the board in 2019.

Immediately before his EUISS appointment, Everts was Senior Adviser on strategy and communications to the High Representative/Vice-President, then Josep Borrell.

=== Director of the EUISS (2023-present) ===
On 7 July 2023, the Board of the EUISS announced that it had appointed Everts as the Institute's new Director, succeeding Gustav Lindstrom, who had led the agency since January 2018. Everts took up the post on 1 September 2023. Under Council Decision 2014/75/CFSP, the EUISS Director is appointed by the Board from among nationals of the member states on a recommendation from the High Representative, for a three-year term that may be extended once by two years.

The EUISS is the European Union's agency for the analysis of foreign, security and defence policy. Headquartered in Paris with a liaison office in Brussels, it employs around 40 staff and is overseen by a board chaired by the High Representative.

During Everts's tenure the Institute has published a series of collective Chaillot Papers intended to feed into EU strategic debate, including 10 ideas for the new team: how the EU can navigate a power political world (September 2024), co-edited with Bojana Zorić and launched to coincide with the arrival of a new EU leadership; Contestation: the new dynamic driving global politics (2024); Unpowering Russia: how the EU can counter and undermine the Kremlin (May 2025), co-edited with Ondrej Ditrych; Low trust: navigating transatlantic relations under Trump 2.0 (October 2025); and Defending Europe, deterring Russia: resources, readiness and resolve (June 2026), written with Luigi Scazzieri.

Also under his directorship, the EUISS partnered with the Robert Schuman Centre for Advanced Studies at the European University Institute, the Trans European Policy Studies Association and the European Initiative for Security Studies to launch Global Risks to the EU, described as the first continent-wide survey of expert perceptions of conflict-related risks to EU security. The first edition was published in January 2025 and a second in 2026.

Everts has represented the Institute before national and European bodies, including an appearance before the Defence Committee of the French National Assembly in February 2025, and has co-hosted EU-India and Indonesia-EU track 1.5 dialogues.

== Views ==
Everts has argued that the EU's foreign policy machinery was designed for a more peaceful and rule-governed international environment that no longer exists and that it requires a substantial overhaul. He has repeatedly criticised what he describes as European passivity, arguing that the Union too often reacts to decisions taken by Washington and Moscow instead of shaping events, and characterising the problem as a European "psychology of weakness" rooted in a lack of resolve rather than a lack of resources.

On the war in Ukraine and Russian hybrid warfare, he has argued that resilience measures alone are insufficient and that the EU needs a deterrence posture and more proactive countermeasures. On transatlantic relations, he has cautioned against assuming that the second Trump administration resembles the first and against European strategies built around accommodating Washington rather than around Europe's own defence.

He has also warned against treating closer alignment with China as an automatic response to transatlantic friction, argued for expanding the international role of the euro and reducing European financial dependence on the United States and made the case that EU enlargement is a geopolitical necessity requiring new mechanisms such as gradual or trial membership.

== Selected publications ==
=== Books and reports ===
- Everts, Steven (2002). Shaping a Credible EU Foreign Policy. London: Centre for European Reform. ISBN 978-1901229271.
- Everts, Steven; Freedman, Lawrence; Grant, Charles; Heisbourg, François; Keohane, Daniel; O'Hanlon, Michael (2004). A European Way of War. London: Centre for European Reform.
- Everts, Steven; Zorić, Bojana, eds. (2024). 10 ideas for the new team: how the EU can navigate a power political world. Chaillot Paper. Paris: EUISS.
- Ditrych, Ondrej; Everts, Steven, eds. (2025). Unpowering Russia: how the EU can counter and undermine the Kremlin. Chaillot Paper. Paris: EUISS.
- Everts, Steven; Spatafora, Giuseppe; Ekman, Alice, eds. (2025). Low trust: navigating transatlantic relations under Trump 2.0. Chaillot Paper. Paris: EUISS.
- Everts, Steven; Scazzieri, Luigi (2026). Defending Europe, deterring Russia: resources, readiness and resolve. Chaillot Paper. Paris: EUISS.

=== Selected papers and articles ===
- "Unilateral America, Lightweight Europe? Managing divergence in transatlantic foreign policy", CER working paper, 2001.
- "EU foreign policy: from bystander to actor", CER policy brief, 2002.
- "The EU and the Middle East: a call for action", CER working paper, 2003.
- "Why the EU needs a security strategy" (with Heather Grabbe), CER briefing note, 2003.
- "Engaging Iran: a test case for EU foreign policy", CER working paper, 2004.
- "Europe's China temptations", India's World, September 2025.
- "Quiet power in the Indo-Pacific: predictability over military might" (with Lizza Bomassi), ISIS Malaysia Focus, November 2025.

== See also ==
- European Union Institute for Security Studies
- Common Foreign and Security Policy
- Common Security and Defence Policy
- European External Action Service
