= Renaud Van Ruymbeke =

French investigative magistrate (1952–2024)

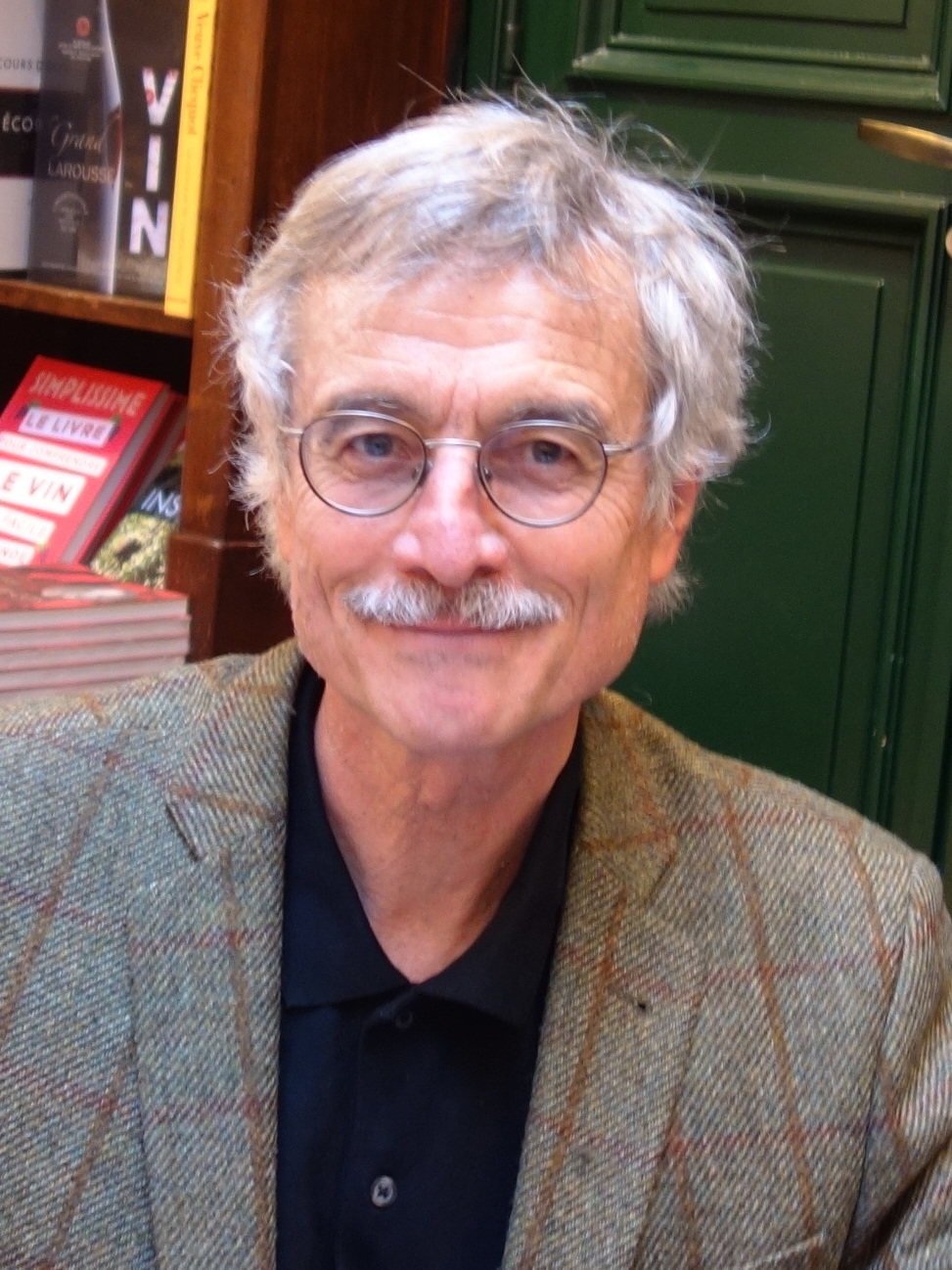
- Van Ruymbeke in 2021
- Born: 10 August 1952; Neuilly-sur-Seine, France
- Died: 10 May 2024 (aged 71); Mordelles, Ille-et-Vilaine, France
- Education: Lycée Lakanal
- Alma mater: École nationale de la magistrature
- Occupation: Magistrate
- Children: 4

Renaud van Ruymbeke (10 August 1952 – 10 May 2024) was a French investigative magistrate, well known for specialising in political and financial corruption cases. He investigated the French-Taiwan Frigates Affair, which was related to the Clearstream case, and the Urba Affair. Van Ruymbeke died of cancer on 10 May 2024 in Mordelles near Rennes at the age of 71.

== Career ==
In February 1975, Renaud Van Ruymbeke began his career as a magistrate. In 1977, after earning a master's degree in law, he graduated from the National School for the Judiciary (École National de la magistrature) and was appointed investigating judge in Caen. From 1983 to 1985, he served as deputy public prosecutor in the financial division of the Caen court. He then left the public prosecutor's office to become an independent judge.

Between December 1985 and December 1988, he served as a lecturer at the National School for the Judiciary. In December 1988, he was appointed judge at the Rennes Court of Appeal and then worked in the investigating chamber of that court at the end of 1991. On the night of February 4–5, 1994, the fire at the historic building housing the Parliament of Brittany left a devastating mark on him. His office was located in the building and he stated at the time: "My investigation is secondary. An extraordinary building has burned down. I am devastated. The rest, you know, isn't the most important ".

In 1996, he signed the Geneva Appeal against corruption with six other judges from different countries. This called for European wide cooperation and harmonisation of practices in the fight against bank secrecy, tax evasion and money laundering.

In April 2000, he joined the Paris High Court (Tribunal de grande instance à Paris) as the first investigating judge in the financial division. In 2013, he was appointed first vice-president in charge of investigations at this court.

On June 28, 2019, he retired and, to mark the occasion, played compositions by Franz Schubert and Franz Liszt on the piano at the Grand Hôtel in Cabourg, Calvados.

== Notable Legal Cases ==
=== Urba Affair ===
In 1992, Renaud Van Ruymbeke conducted a search of the headquarters of the Socialist Party, which, at that time, was part of the ruling coalition. This was the first search in France of a political party in power. According to Daniel Mayer, "the aim is to tarnish [...] the entirety of representative democracy," and for Laurent Fabius, "if he continued to be more anti-socialist than anti-corruption, [there might perhaps] be a Van Ruymbeke affair." Finally, François Mitterrand considered the "procedures rather bizarre." Shocked by the term "indictment," the ruling coalition introduced the term "formal charge" into criminal procedure.

=== Clearstream 2 ===
As the investigating magistrate in the Taiwan frigate affair, Van Ruymbeke received several anonymous letters purporting to provide information on financial crimes committed by numerous political and economic figures. In April 2004, he was drawn into an arrangement by Jean-Louis Gergorin, vice-president of EADS — the group that owns Airbus — that was not authorized by France’s code of criminal procedure: the two men agreed to a secret, unofficial meeting at the office of Thibault de Montbrial, Gergorin's lawyer. The source of the anonymous letters, Gergorin, was therefore known to Van Ruymbeke for some time, who later claimed to have wanted to protect the life of his witness, who asserted that his life was in danger.

After receiving an initial letter of denunciation on May 3, 2004, Van Ruymbeke had EADS vice-president Philippe Delmas arrested in Toulouse, during the inauguration by Jean-Pierre Raffarin of a new Airbus A380 assembly line. Delmas was quickly exonerated. In June 2004, Renaud Van Ruymbeke received a CD-ROM containing 16,121 Clearstream accounts and a second letter entitled "The Scoundrels' Ball." This letter contained a list of 895 accounts allegedly closed by Clearstream. Six accounts at Banca Populare di Sondrio, Italy, were listed, supposedly held by Stéphane Bocsa and Paul de Nagy. This was an allusion to Nicolas Sarkozy, whose full name is Sarközy de Nagy-Bocsa, and whose middle names are Stéphane and Paul. The names of political figures such as Jean-Pierre Chevènement, Alain Madelin, and Dominique Strauss-Kahn were also mentioned. International letters rogatory were sent abroad, particularly to Sondrio, Italy, via the Milan financial prosecutor's office. The Italian response didn't arrive until November 2005: the responses were all negative.

Van Ruymbeke took some time to realise that he was being manipulated. The names of prominent figures were added to the Clearstream lists. The preliminary investigation into the other accounts was closed without further action in May 2005. Proceedings were initiated by accused persons for slander. In early May 2006, it was established that Jean-Louis Gergorin met with Van Ruymbeke outside normal legal procedures. On May 12, 2006, the Minister of Justice, Pascal Clément, initiated a formal process seeking Van Ruymbeke's explanation of his handling of the Clearstream 2 affair. On May 15, 2006, Clément postponed the judge's promotion to the position of presiding judge at the Paris Court of Appeal.

In its report published at the end of January 2007, the General Inspectorate of Judicial Services (IGSJ) was harsh on Van Ruymbeke. The IGSJ identified three grievances that could constitute "a breach of his duties as a magistrate and his duty of loyalty": 1) he should not have questioned Jean-Louis Gergorin outside of official proceedings; 2) he should have informed his colleagues Henri Pons and Jean-Marie d'Huy, who were handling the Clearstream 2 case, that Jean-Louis Gergorin was the author of the anonymous letters received in the Taiwan frigate affair; and 3) he should not have shown documents from his case file to the computer specialist Florian Bourges (an accusation that Van Ruymbeke has always denied).

In early February 2007, Pascal Clément referred Van Ruymbeke to the High Council of the Judiciary (CSM) in a letter stating that the magistrate had "failed in his obligations of prudence and rigor," "loyalty," and "professional discretion." After six years of proceedings and a final hearing before the CSM, the Minister of Justice, Christiane Taubira, announced on October 3, 2012, that she would not seek any sanctions against the judge. Ultimately, the CSM completely exonerated Renaud Van Ruymbeke, confirming the dismissal of all charges against him. The Union of Magistrates, the majority union for magistrates, indicated that it welcomed "the signal this sends. [...] Renaud Van Ruymbeke is one of those magistrates who are being investigated because they are investigating sensitive cases [...]. In this same spirit, we hope that the same will apply to colleagues who have demonstrated independence in their investigations." ».

== Later Years ==
Van Ruymbeke retired in 2019. His status as a retiree offered him more scope to speak freely about his experiences as a judge and about French legal affairs. In 2021, he published *Mémoires d'un juge trop indépendant* (Memoirs of an Overly Independent Judge) in which he discusses his role in the Boulin, Urba, Elf, Clearstream, and Kerviel affairs.

In 2022, he published a second book entitled *Offshore: Dans les coulisses édifiantes des paradis* (Offshore: Behind the Scenes of Tax Havens), in which he revisits his experience with tax fraud during his judicial career.

Van Ruymbeke spent his retirement in Mordelles. He had settled there in 1991 because he was working in Rennes at the time. He made a cameo appearance (photo and voice) in the film *Second Tour*, directed by Albert Dupontel in 2023.

He died of cancer on May 10, 2024 in Rennes.

In 2025, Transparency International France launched the first edition of the Renaud Van Ruymbeke Literary Prize, which recognizes works dedicated to the fight against corruption.

== Publications ==
- Le Juge d'instruction. Que sais-je ? (in French). Presses universitaires de France. 1988. ISBN 978-2715402768.
- Mémoires d'un juge trop indépendant (in French). Paris: Éditions Tallandier. 2021. ISBN 979-1021044081..
- Offshore: dans les coulisses édifiantes des paradis fiscaux (in French). Les Liens qui libèrent. 2022. ISBN 1020911328..
- Le juge d'instruction. Que sais-je ? (in French) (8 ed.). Paris: Presses universitaires de France. 2024 [1988]. ISBN 978-2715422759. ISSN 0768-0066..

== Bibliography ==
- Denis Robert, La justice ou le chaos, Stock, 1996. Interviews and portrait of seven anti-corruption judges: Bernard Bertossa, Edmondo Bruti Liberati, Gherardo Colombo, Benoît Dejemeppe, Baltasar Garzon Real, Carlos Jimenez Villarejo, Renaud Van Ruymbeke
- 9 May 2001 op-ed in Le Monde titled "The black box of financial globalization" with Bernard Bertossa, attorney general in Geneva, Benoît Dejemeppe, king's attorney in Bruxelles (procureur du roi), Eva Joly, judge (juge d'instruction) in Paris, and Jean de Maillard, magistrate in Blois, about the Clearstream scandal, available here.

== See also ==
- Clearstream affair
- fr:Affaire Urba
