= Dominique Moïsi =

French political scientist

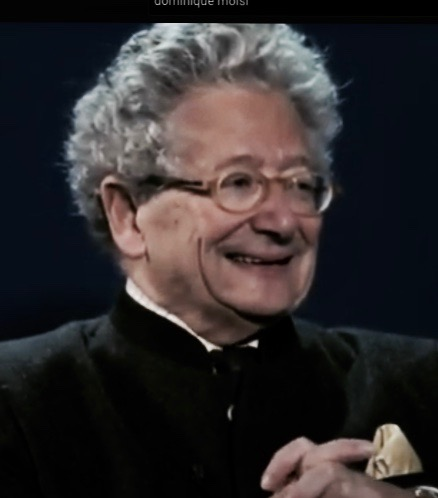

Personal details
- Born: 21 October 1946 (age 79) Neuilly-sur-Seine, France
- Education: Sorbonne; Harvard University; Hebrew University of Jerusalem

Dominique Moïsi (born 21 October 1946) is a French political scientist and writer.

He was a co-founder and is a senior advisor of the Paris-based Institut Français des Relations Internationales (IFRI), Pierre Keller Visiting Professor at Harvard University, and the chairholder for Geopolitics at the College of Europe, the oldest educational institution in European affairs, in Natolin. He is also a Fellow at CEDEP, the European Centre for Executive Development. Moïsi regularly contributes op-ed articles and essays to the Financial Times, Foreign Affairs, the Project Syndicate as well as Die Welt and Der Standard.

Moïsi is married to the historian and writer Diana Pinto. The couple has two sons.

== Life ==
His father Jules Moïsi was an Auschwitz survivor, member of the Mauthausen concentration camp's kommando. Dominique Moïsi studied Political science at the Sorbonne and at Harvard University. He was research assistant to Raymond Aron and taught at the École nationale d'administration (ENA), the École des Hautes Études en Sciences Sociales, and the Institut d’Études Politiques de Paris. He was editor in chief of Politique étrangère.

After the fall of the Berlin Wall in 1989, he aroused attention as one of the first French commentators to welcome the conceivable end of Germany's division as an opportunity for Europe. Many years later Moïsi explained his position by pointing to his father whose fate as an Auschwitz survivor had made him "fall in love with Europe". Like Simone Veil, Jules Moïsi believed that the unification of Europe was the best way of overcoming the "tragedy of the past".

During the 1990s Timothy Garton Ash, Michael Mertes and Dominique Moïsi wrote several "trilateral" (British-German-French) pleas in favour of a combined eastward enlargement and institutional modernisation of the EU.

Moïsi is a member of the International Advisory Council of the Moscow School of Political Studies and of the European Council on Foreign Relations.

In 2008, he published La géopolitique de l’émotion: Comment les cultures de peur, d’humiliation et d’espoir façonnent le monde (English translation 2009).

== Selected bibliography ==
- Le Nouveau Continent: Plaidoyer pour une Europe renaissante (with Jacques Rupnik). Calmann-Lévy, Paris 1991, ISBN 978-2-7021-1961-7
- Les Cartes de la France à l’heure de la mondialisation (based on an interview with Hubert Védrine). Fayard, Paris 2000, ISBN 978-2-213-60422-0
- The Geopolitics of Emotion: How Cultures of Fear, Humiliation, and Hope are Reshaping the World. Anchor Books, New York 2010. ISBN 978-0-307-38737-0
- Un Juif improbable. Flammarion, Paris 2011. ISBN 978-2-08-123674-5
