= Steven Muller =

American academic administrator (1927–2013)

10th President of Johns Hopkins University
- In office 1972–1990
- Preceded by: Milton S. Eisenhower
- Succeeded by: William C. Richardson

Personal details
- Born: 1927
- Died: January 19, 2013 (aged 85–86)

Steven Muller (November 22, 1927 – January 19, 2013) was a German-American professor of political science, author, and the president of the Johns Hopkins University, serving from 1972 to 1990.

He was born in Hamburg, Germany, the son of Marianne (née Hartstein) and Werner A. Muller. His father was Jewish, and, as the Nazis rose to power in Germany, the family suffered increasing persecution. During Kristallnacht in 1938, his father was arrested by the Nazis. Thanks to influential friends, he was released after a short time, but this experience convinced him that he and his family had to leave Germany. His father left first, followed by the rest of the family shortly before the German invasion of Poland in September 1939. After settling briefly in England, the family immigrated to the United States in 1940 and moved to Los Angeles, where his father ran a candy store and Steven sold the Saturday Evening Post on the street. Approached by a Hollywood screenwriter on the street, Muller was introduced to moviemaking and eventually appeared in seven films, including The White Cliffs of Dover. He became a naturalized citizen of the U.S. in 1949.

Choosing higher education over the movie industry, Muller graduated from UCLA in 1948 and received his Ph.D. in Government from Cornell University. From 1949 to 1951 he was a Rhodes Scholar at Oxford University. After serving in the Army Signal Corps during 1954-1955, he was Assistant Professor of Political Science at Haverford College and Assistant Professor of Government at Cornell University. While serving as Vice President for Public Affairs of Cornell University, Muller played a leading role in negotiating the end to the occupation of Willard Straight Hall by African American students on April 20, 1969.

== Tenure at Johns Hopkins ==
In 1971 Muller became Provost at JHU, under President Lincoln Gordon. Shortly after being named Provost, Gordon abruptly resigned from the Hopkins presidency, under pressure from senior faculty, and left town shortly thereafter. Milton S. Eisenhower returned to the presidency in an interim capacity, with Muller serving as Provost. In 1972 he became the University's 10th President, and thereafter was named president of Johns Hopkins Hospital. He was the first person to serve as head of both the University and the Hospital since Daniel Coit Gilman in 1889. Muller was the second longest serving president of JHU, serving until his retirement in 1990. He was president of JHH until 1983.

During his 18-year tenure as president:

- The Peabody Institute began an affiliation agreement with Johns Hopkins (1978), and later became a division of the university (1986)
- The Hopkins Hundreds Campaign raised $109 million from 1973 to 1976, making possible the creation of 26 new endowed professorial chairs
- An FM radio station, WJHU (88.1 FM) was established (1979)
- The GWC Whiting School of Engineering was established in 1979. The previous School of Engineering had been combined with Arts & Sciences in 1966
- An agreement to locate the Space Telescope Science Institute on the JHU campus was concluded (and dedicated in 1983)
- The Hopkins–Nanjing Center was established with the Nanjing University in 1986.
- The Campaign for Johns Hopkins kicked off in 1984 with a goal to raise $450 million. It concluded in 1989 after raising $600 million.

== Academic specialization and other work ==
Muller's specialties were comparative government and international relations, with particular emphasis on political developments in Europe. He has authored a textbook and numerous articles in this field.

At the time of his death, Muller was co-chairman of the American Institute for Contemporary German Studies at JHU; trustee of the German Marshall Fund of the United States; member of the executive committee of the Atlantic Council of the United States.

He was also a trustee for many years on the Board of Trustees of St. Mary's College of Maryland where he played key roles in advancing the school to national prominence.

In June 1990, the main building of the Space Telescope Science Institute in Baltimore was named "Steven Muller Building" after him.

He died on January 19, 2013, at his home in Washington, D.C. He was 85.

== Partial bibliography ==
- From Occupation to Cooperation. The United States and United Germany in a Changing World Order (co-editor, with Gebhard Schweigler). W. W. Norton & Company, New York/London 1992, ISBN 0-393-96254-7
- Universities in the Twenty First Century (editor). Berghahn Books, Providence/Oxford 1996. ISBN 1-57181-026-9
- In Search of Germany (co-editor, with Michael Mertes and Heinrich August Winkler). Transaction Publishers, New Brunswick/London 1996, ISBN 1-56000-880-6
