= Heinrich August Winkler =

German historian (born 1938)

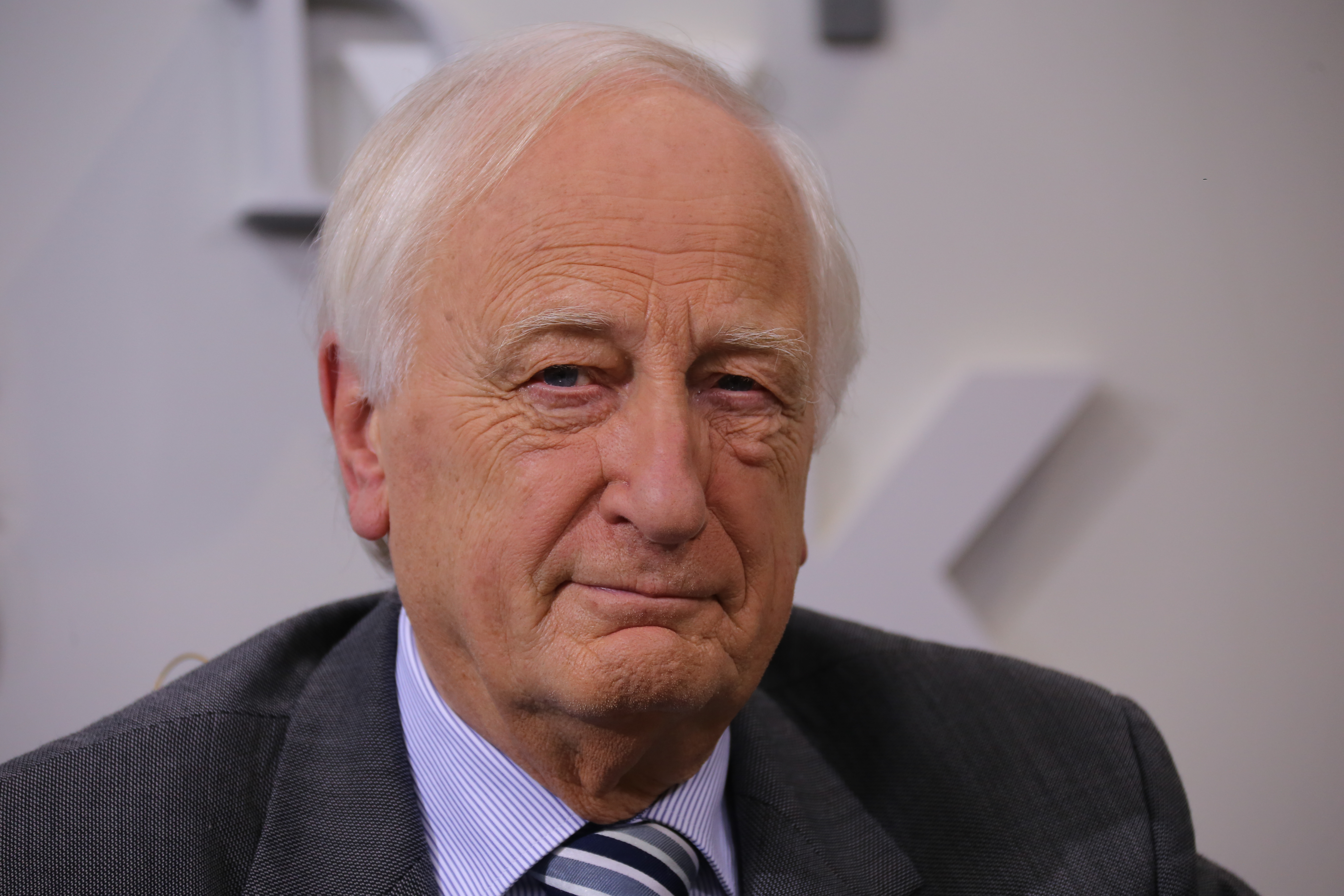
- Winkler in 2014
- Born: 19 December 1938 (age 87); Königsberg, East Prussia, Germany
- Occupation: Historian

Heinrich August Winkler (born 19 December 1938 in Königsberg) is a German historian.

With his mother he joined the westward flight in 1944, after which he grew up in southern Germany, attending a Gymnasium in Ulm. He then studied history, political science, philosophy and public law at Münster, Heidelberg and Tübingen. In 1970 he became professor at the Free University of Berlin. From 1972 to 1991 he was professor at the University of Freiburg. Since 1991 he has held a chair of modern history at the Humboldt University Berlin. He has been a member of the Social Democratic Party of Germany (SPD) since 1962, and has ties to numerous prominent politicians within that party, including former Chancellor Gerhard Schröder. He is the author of a book detailing a comprehensive political history of the Weimar Republic, among others.

During the Historikerstreit, Winkler was a leading critic of Ernst Nolte.

== Selected bibliography ==
- "From Social Protectionism to National Socialism: The German Small-Business Movement in Comparative Perspective", The Journal of Modern History Vol. 48, No. 1, March 1976
- In Search of Germany (with Michael Mertes and Steven Muller). New Brunswick and London: Transaction, 1996, ISBN 1-56000-880-6
- Germany: The Long Road West. Vol. 1: 1789–1933. Oxford: Oxford University Press, Oxford 2006, ISBN 978-0-19-926597-8
- Germany: The Long Road West. Vol. 2: 1933–1990. Oxford: Oxford University Press, Oxford 2007, ISBN 978-0-19-926598-5
- Weimar 1918–1933: Die Geschichte der ersten Deutschen Demokratie. Munich: C. H. Beck, 1993, ISBN 978-3-406-72692-7
