= Institut français des relations internationales =

French think tank

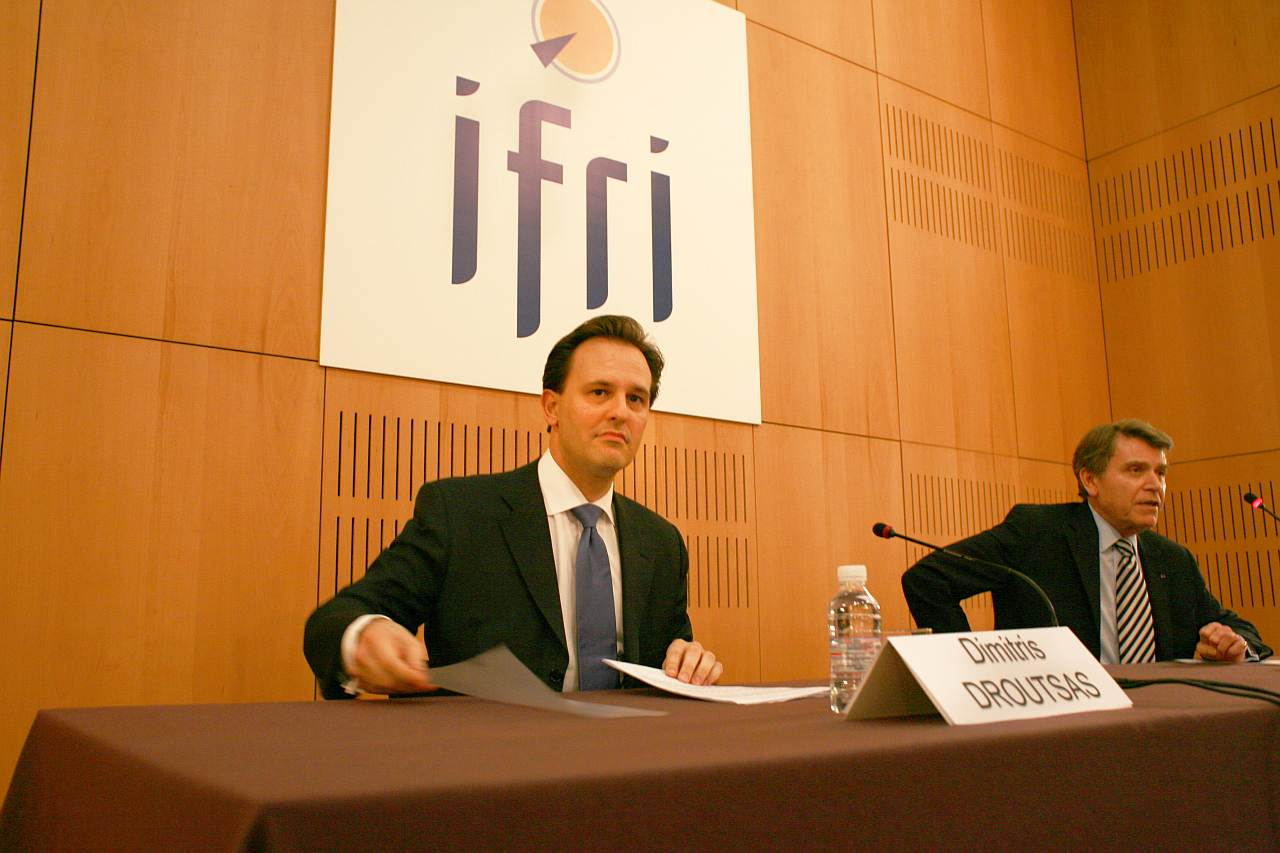
- Dimitris Droutsas and Thierry de Montbrial
- Established: 1979
- President: Thierry de Montbrial
- Location: Paris, France
- Website: www.ifri.org

The Institut français des relations internationales (IFRI, English: French Institute of International Relations) is a think tank dedicated to international affairs, based in Paris, France.

== Overview ==
IFRI was established in 1979 by Thierry de Montbrial, who was inspired by the American model of research institutions. Ifri aims at gathering decision-makers and researchers to develop research and debate on major contemporary international issues.

In 2011, for the fourth consecutive year, Ifri was the only French based research institution to be ranked among the top 50 most influential think tanks worldwide outside of the United States, placing 3rd in Western Europe according to "Global Go-To Think Tanks", a study undertaken by a team of researchers from the University of Pennsylvania, and ranking more than 6,480 institutes located in 169 countries.

IFRI's goal is to:

- Develop applied research in the field of public policy, related to international issues; and
- Foster interactive and constructive dialogue between researchers, professionals, and opinion leaders.

IFRI is independent from all administrative and financial regulatory authorities and has no affiliation with any political party. Its political and intellectual independence is paramount and the Institute chose to diversify its public and private sources of funding. Its budget amounts to about 6.5 million Euros, about 70% of which is from private sources.

IFRI employs 60 people or so, 30 of them being French, and the balance are foreign researchers from various backgrounds. More than half of them are less than 40 years old.

Outside of their research work, every year, IFRI hosts guest speakers from all over the world for them to shed light upon international issues. The Institute organizes about 40 conferences each year in Paris (42 in 2011). Guest speakers from previous years have included, among others: Nicolas Sarkozy, Dmitri Medvedev, Hu Jintao, Jalal Talabani, Hamid Karzai, Vladimir Putin, Mikheil Saakashvili, Abdoulaye Wade, Václav Klaus, Pervez Musharraf, Abdullah Gül, Boris Tadic, Viktor Yanukovych, Paul Kagamé, Herman Van Rompuy, José Manuel Barroso, and Anders Fogh Rasmussen.

== History ==
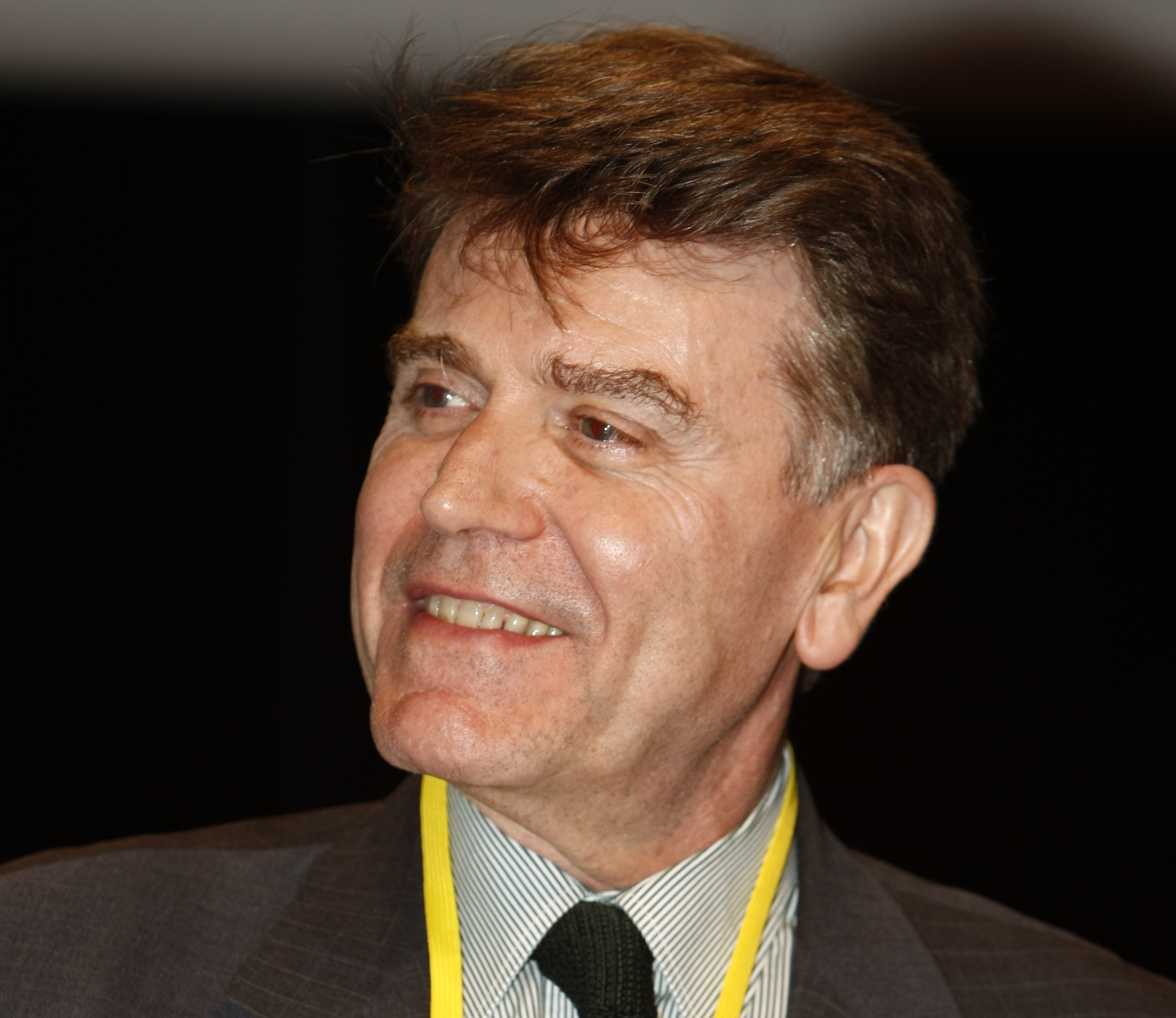
Thierry de Montbrial

In 1973, Minister of Foreign Affairs Michel Jobert under President Georges Pompidou put Thierry de Montbrial in charge of establishing the Centre d’Analyse et de Prévision at the Ministry in order to analyze the international relations system. This encouraged him to imagine an independent research center dedicated to this subject.

In 1979, he founded IFRI with the support of Prime Minister Raymond Barre and Minister of Foreign Affairs Louis de Guiringaud and his successor Jean François-Poncet. Marc Gilbert (in French), ex producer of Italiques (in French) at the Office de Radiodiffusion Télévision Française became the general secretary.

IFRI was established upon an already existing institution, the Centre d’Etudes de Politique Etrangère founded in 1935 by French universities and by the Carnegie Endowment for International Peace.

Today, the Institute has about 80 partner companies and almost 400 members, who are either private individuals or state and NGO institutions. Dominique Moïsi is a special advisor.

== Networks and international influence ==
IFRI works in partnership with its counterparts on a regular basis; the RAND Corporation, the Brookings Institution, the Council On Foreign Relations and the Center for Strategic and International Studies (CSIS), the Carnegie Endowment For International Peace, the Japan Institute for International Affairs (JIIA), the Moscow State Institute of International Relations (MGIMO), the French-Korean Foundation, the Deutsche Gesellschaft für Auswärtige Politik, and others.

IFRI has also had a presence in Brussels since March 2005; Ifri Bruxelles organizes about 30 events each year.

== Missions ==
The policy oriented research advocated by Ifri aims at highlighting the important international events. It is mainly addressed to political and economical decision-makers, academic institutions, opinion leaders as well as representative of civil societies.

To carry out this ambition, its work is divided into research centers which are organized by

- regions (Europe, Asia, Africa, Middle East/Maghreb, contemporary Turkey, the United States of America, Russia/NIS, French-German relations)
- and themes (globalization and global economics, strategic and security issues, migrations and identity issues, energy geopolitics, climate, etc.).

Each center publishes its own collection online, available on the Ifri website.

== Publications ==
Ramsès, an annual collective work and the quarterly magazine Politique Etrangère are the two main editorial activities of IFRI. Since 1981, the annual report Ramsès is dedicated to the main global trends, and its circulation runs about 10,000 copies. Politique Etrangère, which was created in 1936, is the first French magazine on the subject. This quarterly magazine offers a cross-divisional vision of the current international affairs. A special issue was published in 2006 to celebrate the magazine's 70th anniversary.

Along with these two references, Ifri also publishes shorter or more specialized works; Notes de l’Ifri and Les Etudes de l’Ifri, a short magazine named Actuelles de l’Ifri as well as IFRI's online collections – about 10 – and the books written by the IFRI researchers. IFRI publishes its findings in several languages. In 2012, 12 of these books were published, four of which in foreign languages, as well as 130 Notes d'Ifri, half of which in foreign languages – English, German and Russian.

== Funding ==
IFRI's budget amounted to about 6.5 million Euros in 2011. IFRI's sources of funding are various: subsidies or State contracts, private funding from individuals or companies. The members list is available online under the IFRI's Partners section.
