= Bernard Bertossa =

Swiss lawyer

Bernard Bertossa was Geneva's public prosecutor from 1990 to 2002. He signed the 1996 "Appel de Genève" against international money laundering and other financial criminal activities. With French investigative magistrate Eva Joly, Brussels's king's attorney (procureur du roi) Benoît Dejemeppe, Blois' magistrate Jean de Maillard and investigative magistrate Renaud Van Ruymbeke, he signed a 9 May 2001 op-ed in Le Monde newspaper, titled ""The 'black boxes' of financial globalization", which supported investigative reporter Denis Robert in his discovery of the Clearstream Affair.

== See also ==
- Clearstream
