= Foundation for Strategic Research =

French think tank

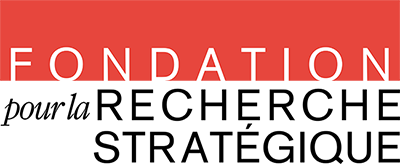
- Logo

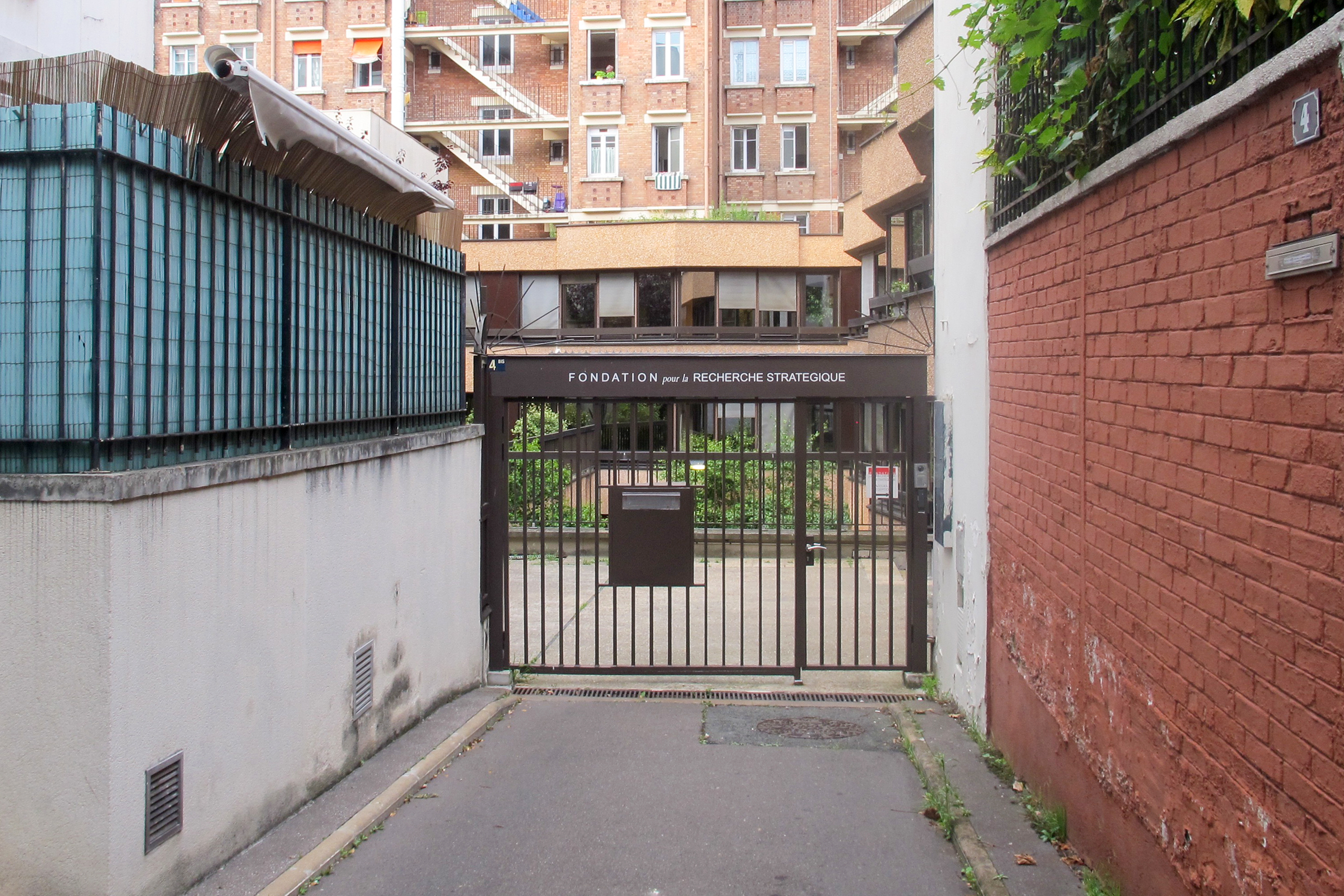
- Predecessor: Fondation pour les Études de Défense or Foundation for Defence Studies (FED); Centre de Recherches et d'Études sur les Stratégies et les Technologies or Centre for Study of Strategies and Technologies (CREST)
- Formation: 1992
- Founder: Pierre Joxe
- Founded at: France
- Type: Think tank
- Fields: National security, defense
- Director: Xavier Pasco
- Board of directors: Bruno Racine (chairman)
- Website: frstrategie.org

The Foundation for Strategic Research (Fondation pour la recherche stratégique or FRS) is an independent French think-tank. It was founded by Pierre Joxe (then Minister of Defence) in 1992-1993 by merging the FED (Fondation pour les Études de Défense or Foundation for Defence Studies) and the CREST (Centre de Recherches et d'Études sur les Stratégies et les Technologies or Centre for Study of Strategies and Technologies).

Its missions are to analyze strategic and international security issues, notably military and defense-related issues, and to contribute to the strategic debate in France as well as to the diffusion of French ideas abroad. It is the only major independent French think-tanks to work exclusively on these questions. It has furthermore been described by Hadrien Desuin as having a neoconservative orientation.

Its experts (44 researchers including 22 permanent ones) cover the whole range of security and defense issues, from international relations to scientific, technological and operational questions, as well as defense industry and economy, the analysis of cross-cutting threats (terrorism, cyberattacks, NBC proliferation…) as well as health and environmental risks.

Its partners are public and private: French government partners include the Ministry of Armed Forces, Ministry of Foreign Affairs and International Development, Prime Minister’s Office, Atomic Energy Commission, National Space Studies Center, National Air & Space Research Office, National Institute for Health and Medical Research; European Union institutions include the European Commission, European External Action Service, European Parliament, European Space Agency, and the European Defense Agency; international organizations include the United Nations and North Atlantic Treaty Organization. The Foundation also works with French and European private sector firms, as well as, for specific projects, the governments of some foreign countries Australia, Finland, Japan, Poland, the United Kingdom, etc.

In 2016, the Foundation's resources amounted to 3.68 million euros. Research funding originated from ministries (64%), EU and international organizations (14%), public agencies (10%), private sector firms (9%), and various sources (3%: projects with other think-tanks).

In November 2019, foundation researcher Valerie Niquet was sued by Huawei after she made comments relating to the company in two television programs in February of that year. Huawei took issue with Niquet asserting that Huawei had ties with the Chinese government. Suits were also filed as defamation lawsuits in March 2019 against a broadcast journalist and a wireless network expert, all of whom commented on television.

== Directors and board ==
The chairman of the board is Bruno Racine.

Directors:

- 1992/93 – 31 May 2005 : François Heisbourg (IEP de Paris & ENA)
- 1 June 2005 – 1 September 2008 : Guillaume Schlumberger (X & ENA)
- 1 September 2008 – 4 October 2016 : Camille Grand (Sciences Po Paris)
- 4 October 2016 – present : Xavier Pasco
