= Sharon Pardo =

Israeli professor (born 1971)

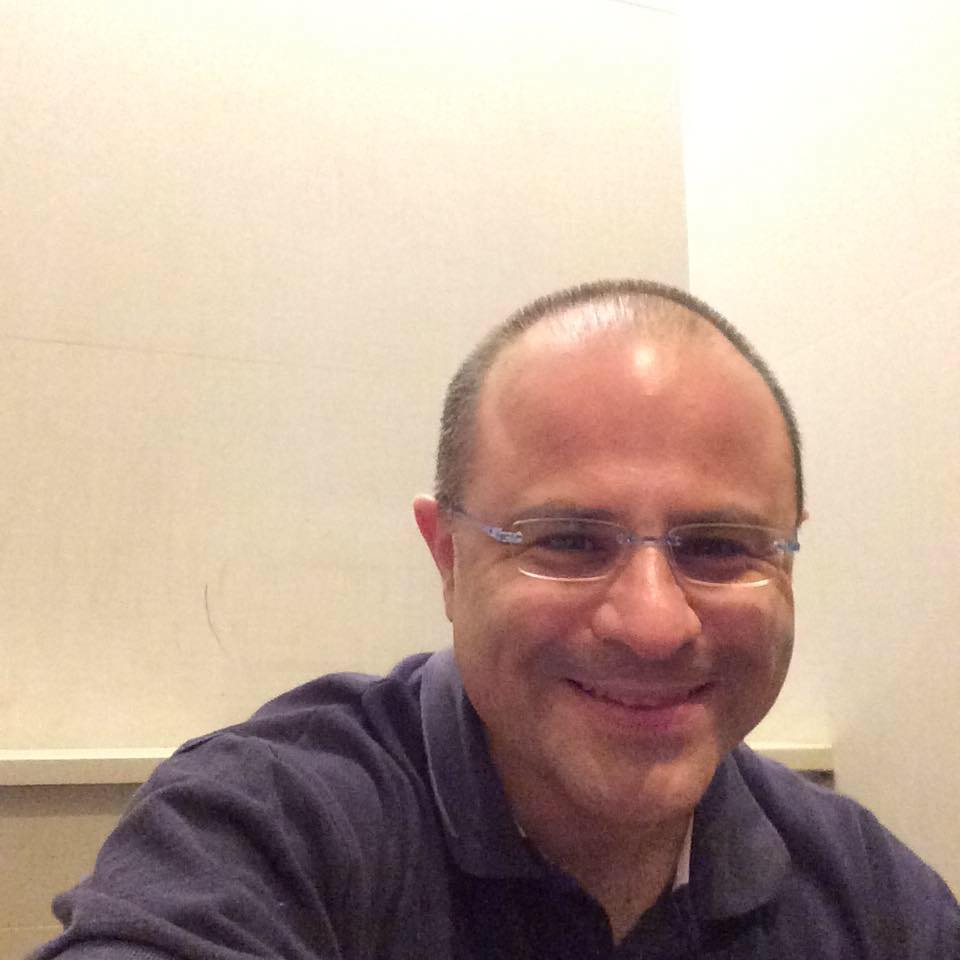
Sharon Pardo

Sharon Pardo (Hebrew: שרון פרדו; born 17 February 1971) is an Israeli Professor of International Relations and a Jean Monnet Chair ad personam in European Studies at Ben-Gurion University of the Negev.

== Biography ==
Pardo was born in Haifa. He received his LL.B. (1996) and his LL.M. (1997) from the University of Sheffield's School of Law, and his Ph.D. (2003) from Ghent University, Faculty of Political and Social Studies. His doctoral thesis dealt with “The Euro-Mediterranean Partnership: From European Unilateralism to Regional Regime.”

Pardo is a senior researcher at The Simone Veil Research Centre for Contemporary European Studies – The National Jean Monnet Centre of Excellence at Ben-Gurion University of the Negev (BGU).

Pardo served as the chairperson of the Department of Politics and Government at BGU from 2016 to 2018. He is a senior adjunct fellow at the National Centre for Research on Europe (NCRE), University of Canterbury, New Zealand, and a member of the board of the Israeli Association for International Studies (IAIS).

Pardo is a member of the board of the Israel Council on Foreign Relations (ICFR), a member of the International Advisory Council of the Konrad Adenauer Foundation, and a Member of the Israel Bar Association. He is the co-editor of Europe and the World book series by Lexington Books.

== Selected bibliography ==
- Uneasy Neighbors: Israel and the European Union (with Joel Peters). Lexington Books, Lanham MD 2010, ISBN 978-0-7391-2755-1
- Israel and the European Union: A Documentary History (with Joel Peters). Lexington Books, Lanham MD 2012, ISBN 978-0-7391-4812-9
- Normative Power Europe Meets Israel: Perceptions and Realities. Lexington Books, Lanham MD 2015, ISBN 978-0-7391-9566-6
- The Jewish Contribution to European Integration (with Hila Zahavi). Lexington Books, Lanham MD 2019, ISBN 978-1-7936-0319-7
