= François Heisbourg =

French diplomat (born 1949)

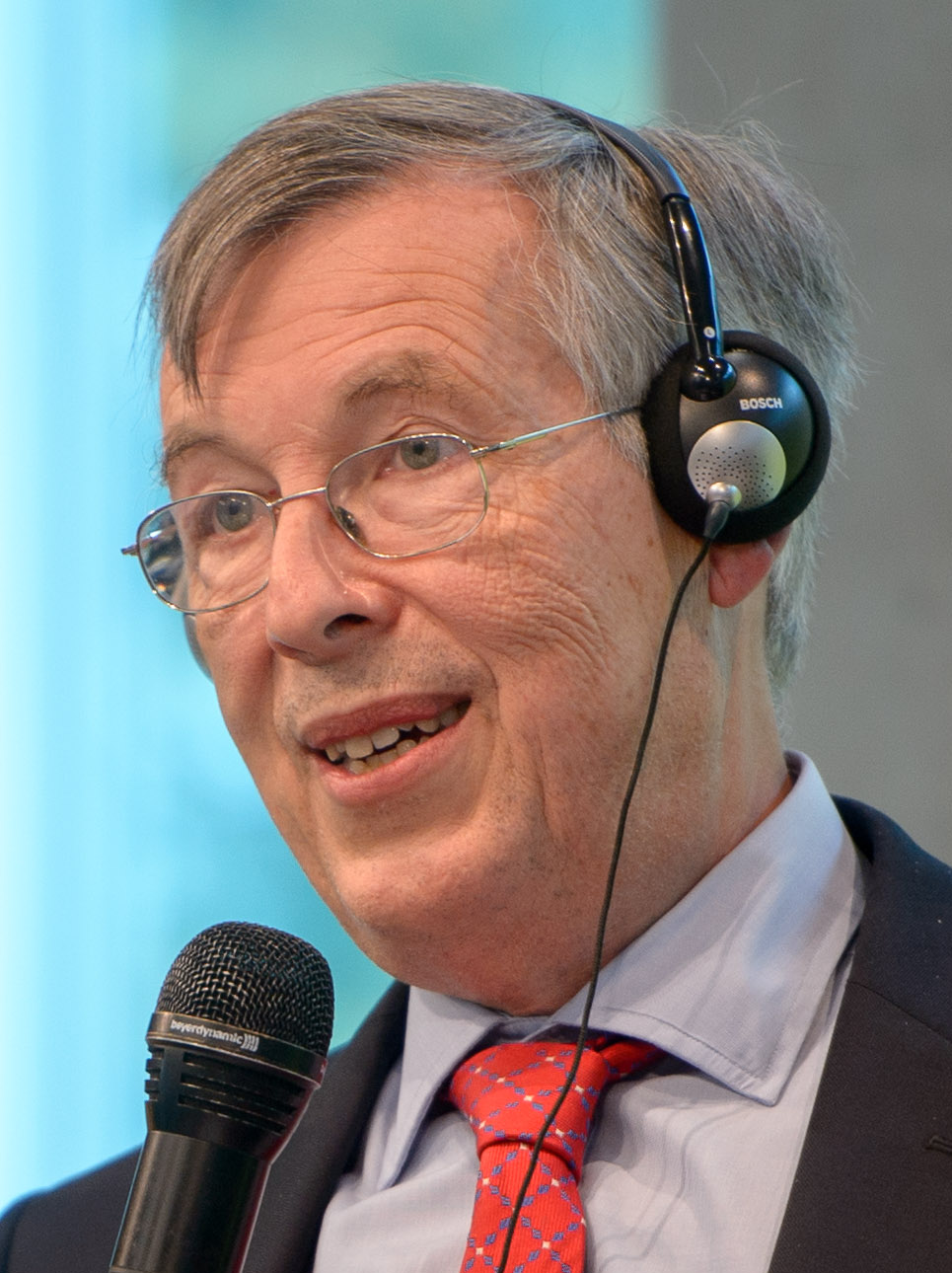
- François Heisbourg in 2015
- Born: 24 June 1949 (age 76); London, United Kingdom
- Education: Sciences Po; École nationale d'administration
- Occupation: Diplomat

François Heisbourg (born 24 June 1949) is currently Senior Advisor for Europe at the International Institute for Strategic Studies (IISS) and Special Advisor at the Paris-based Fondation pour la Recherche Stratégique. He was director of the IISS from 1987 to 1992 and its chairman from 2001 to 2018.

== Publications ==
Books published in France since 2000, by order of publication:

- 2001 : Hyperterrorisme, la nouvelle guerre, (avec la FRS), Éditions Odile Jacob ISBN 978-2-73811-080-0
- 2004 : 11 septembre, rapport de La commission d'enquête, de la Commission nationale sur les attaques terroristes contre les États-Unis (préface), Les Équateurs ISBN 978-2-84990014-7
- 2005 : La Fin de l'Occident. L’Amérique, l'Europe et le Moyen-Orient, Ed. Odile Jacob
- 2006 : Le Terrorisme en France aujourd'hui (avec Jean-Luc Marret), Les Équateurs
- 2007 : L’Épaisseur du monde, Stock
- 2007 : Iran, le choix des armes, Stock
- 2009 : Après Al Qaida - La nouvelle génération du terrorisme, Stock
- 2010 : Vainqueurs et vaincus, lendemains de crise, Stock
- 2010 : Les Conséquences stratégiques de la crise (direction), Ed. Odile Jacob
- 2011 : Les armes nucléaires ont-elles un avenir? (direction), Ed. Odile Jacob
- 2011 : Espace militaire. L’Europe entre souveraineté et coopération (avec Xavier Pasco), Choiseul
- 2012 : Espionnage et Renseignement. Le vrai dossier, Ed. Odile Jacob
- 2013 : La Fin du rêve européen, Stock
- 2015 : Secrètes histoires, Stock
- 2016 : Comment perdre la guerre contre le terrorisme, Stock
- 2025 : Le Suicide de l’Amérique, Odile Jacob
