= Eva Joly =

Norwegian-born French magistrate and politician (born 1943)

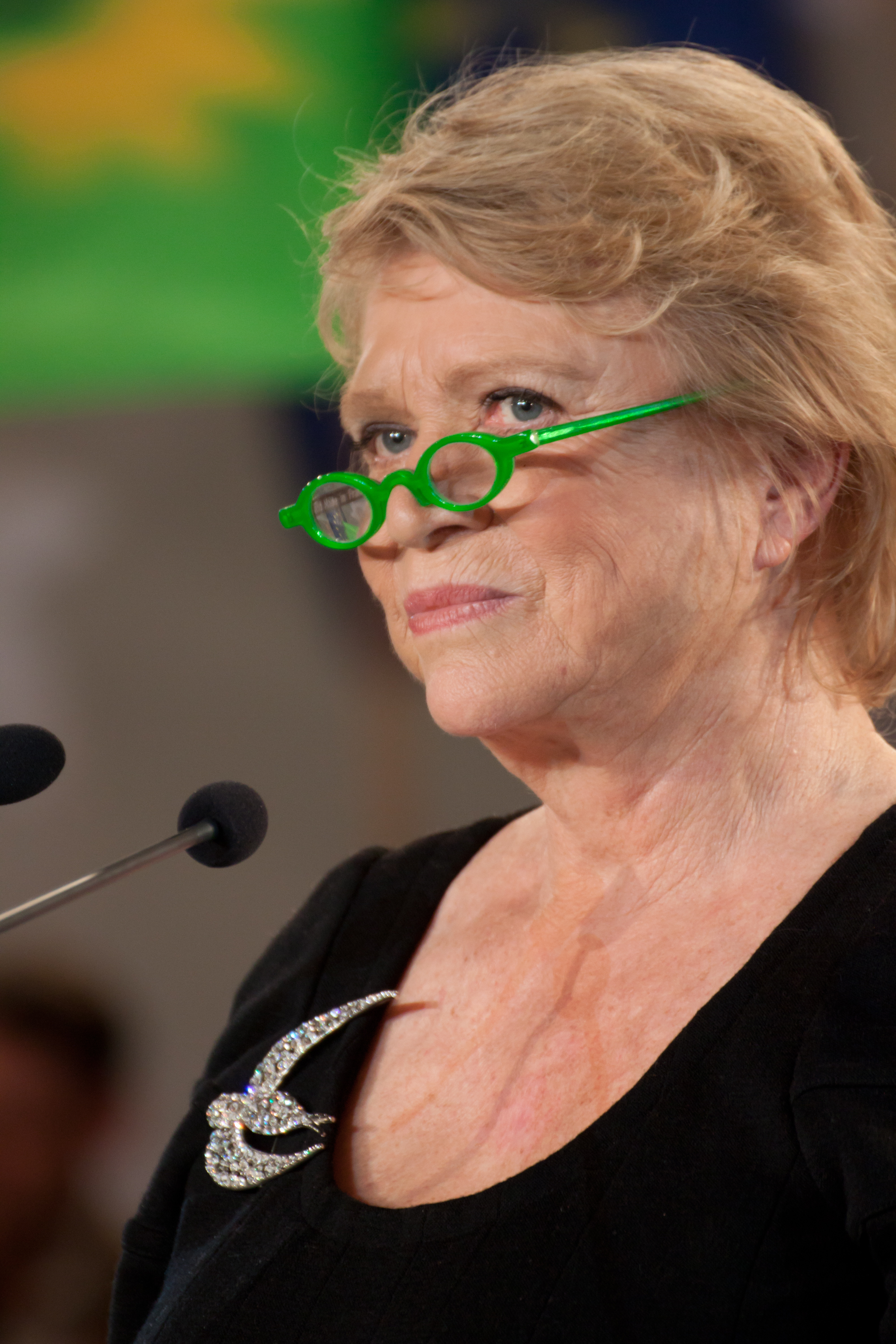

Member of the European Parliament for Île-de-France
- In office 14 July 2009 – 1 July 2019

Personal details
- Born: Gro Farseth; 5 December 1943 (age 82) Grünerløkka, Oslo, Nazi-occupied Norway
- Party: Europe Écologie–The Greens
- Spouse(s): Pascal Joly (m.1967 divorce, deceased 2001)
- Children: Caroline Joly and Julien Joly
- Occupation: Politician, MEP
- Profession: Judge

Eva Joly (French: [eva ʒɔli]; born Gro Eva Farseth; 5 December 1943) is a Norwegian-born French juge d'instruction (magistrate) and politician for Europe Écologie–The Greens. She represented that party as a candidate for the presidency of France in the 2012 elections. She also served as a Member of the European Parliament from 2009 until 2019.

== Early life ==
Born in the neighbourhood of Grünerløkka, Oslo in 1943 during Norway's occupation by Nazi Germany, she was raised by a tailor father and a hairdresser mother and grew up in what was then a working-class district of the inner city. She moved to Paris at 20 to work as an au pair. There she married the son of the family who employed her, Pascal Joly (now deceased), and adopted her middle name 'Eva', which is easier to pronounce in French.

== Career ==
=== Anti-corruption activist ===
While working as a secretary, Joly studied law at night school and became a magistrate when she was 38. Joly specialised in financial affairs, and in 1990, she joined the High Court of Paris (Court of Cassation) as an investigating judge.

She campaigned against corruption, in particular taking on, among others, former minister Bernard Tapie and the bank Crédit Lyonnais. Her best known case, however, was that of France's leading oil company, Elf Aquitaine. In the face of death threats, she carried on the case to uncover several cases of fraud, leading to the conviction of tens of persons involved in the oil business. In 2001, she received for this work the award for integrity from the non-governmental organisation Transparency International.

In 2002, Joly was asked by the Norwegian Minister of Justice, Odd Einar Dørum, to accept a three-year position as a special advisor on corruption. The Anti-Corruption and Money Laundering project involved cooperation between the Ministry of Justice and Police, and the Ministry of Foreign Affairs in Norway. The project worked on issues related to financial crimes and organized crime, with a special focus on strong international cooperation. Collaboration with the Ministry of Finance was also important, in addition to strengthening connections to the private sector. The project has among other things led to a Norwegian focus on corruption in foreign affairs. During the three-year period Joly also initiated the Paris Declaration Against Corruption in 2003.

In 2009, Joly was employed as a special adviser by the Icelandic government to investigate the possibility that white-collar crime may have played a part in the 2008–2011 Icelandic financial crisis. On 10 June 2009, during an interview in Kastljós, Joly criticized the Icelandic government for lack of funding and manpower for the investigation. She further stated her opinion that the Attorney General of Iceland, Valtýr Sigurðsson, should step down due his close family ties to the CEO of Exista. He had previously resigned from all cases involving the Special Prosecutor, Ólafur Þór Hauksson, who handled all cases related to the financial crash. Joly enjoyed widespread trust of the population of Iceland for her work during the stay there.

The French film L'Ivresse du pouvoir (English title "Comedy of Power", 2006) is loosely based on Joly.

=== Member of the European Parliament, 2009–2019 ===
On 7 June 2009, Joly was elected as a French member of the European Parliament on the Ile de France "Europe Écologie" list on which she was second after Daniel Cohn-Bendit.

During her first term in Parliament between 2009 and 2014, Joly held the position of chairwoman of the Committee on Development. After the 2014 European elections, Joly joined the Committee on Civil Liberties, Justice and Home Affairs. She later became vice-chairwoman of the Parliament's special committees created to investigate the Luxleaks scandal in 2015 into the Panama Papers scandal in 2016, respectively. Within the Greens–European Free Alliance parliamentary group, she served as spokesperson on financial policy.

In addition to her committee assignments, Joly was a member of the Parliament's delegations for relations with Afghanistan and to the Parliamentary Assembly of the Mediterranean. She previously served as member of the delegation to the ACP–EU Joint Parliamentary Assembly between 2009 and 2014.

Joly also worked in Afghanistan during July 2012 as part of an UN anti-corruption mission.

When Joly filed a lawsuit in December 2015 on behalf of the company's works council, a preliminary tax inquiry into McDonald's was opened in early 2015. Joly accused the company of understating its earnings to avoid a legal obligation to share profits with employees.

=== Candidate for President, 2011–2012 ===
In 2011, Joly competed in the primaries of Europe Écologie–The Greens against Nicolas Hulot, Stéphane Lhomme and Henri Stoll to represent the party at the 2012 presidential election. She was elected in the second round of voting against Hulot, with 58% of votes. At the first round of the presidential election, she received 2.3% of the vote, and subsequently endorsed Socialist Party candidate François Hollande for the second round.

== Other activities ==
- Global Financial Integrity, member of the advisory board (since 2007)
- Open Society Justice Initiative, Member of the Board
- Norwegian Agency for Development Cooperation (Norad), Counsellor (2005-2009)

== Political positions ==
During her 2012 presidential campaign, Joly called for stopping all nuclear energy production in France by 2020 and deriving 40% of the country's energy needs from renewable sources by that date. She also wanted to replace the Stability and Growth Pact on budget discipline with an Ecological and Social Development Pact, with financial, environmental and social targets.

In addition, Joly promised to increase minimum income benefits by 50%, freeze rents for three years and introduce new tax rates of 60% for those earning 100,000 euros or more a year and 70% for those earning over 500,000 euros. She also demanded a minimum 17% corporate tax rate on multinational companies.

Ahead of the Green movement's primaries in 2021, Joly endorsed Éric Piolle and later Yannick Jadot as the movement's candidate for the French presidential election in 2022.

== Controversies ==
In June 2010, Joly was sent a court summons by Nadine Berthélémy-Dupuis, an investigating magistrate in Paris, following a legal complaint from David Douillet, a retired sportsman and a national member of parliament from France's then-ruling Union for a Popular Movement. Douillet alleged that Joly breached France's defamation laws when she made comments at a public meeting in September 2009 about his banking arrangements.

In November 2011, Joly was criticized for her support of the Greens' deal with the Socialist Party under which they gained safe seats in parliament, in exchange for accepting a slow-motion plan to reduce nuclear energy use to 50 percent of electricity generation by 2025.

During her 2012 presidential campaign, Joly led reporters on a tour of sites linked to bad publicity or sleaze allegations around then-president Nicolas Sarkozy. Her tour included a Champs-Élysées nightspot in which Sarkozy feted his 2007 victory with millionaire friends, and the home of L'Oréal heiress Liliane Bettencourt, at the centre of an investigation into illegal alleged cash contributions to his 2007 campaign.

== Published works ==
- Notre affaire à tous, 2000
- Korrupsjonsjeger: Fra Grünerløkka til Palais de Justice, 2001
- Est-ce dans ce monde-là que nous voulons vivre?, 2003
- 9 May 2001 op-ed in Le Monde, signed with Renaud van Ruymbeke, Bernard Bertossa and other European magistrates or attorneys-general, titled "The black boxes of financial globalization", about the Clearstream scandal (Clearstream has been qualified as a "bank of banks" and accused of being a major platform of global money laundering and tax evasion)

=== Novel ===
- Eva Joly and Judith Perrignon, Les yeux de Lira (Ardennes Editions, 2011) (trans. by Emily Read as The Eyes of Lira Kazan (Bitter Lemon Press, 2012); by Friðrik Rafnsson as Augu Líru (Skrudda, 2012))

== Recognition ==
- 2002 – Peer Gynt Prize
- 2002 – European of the Year
- 2012 – Sophie Prize
