= Jean-Louis Gergorin =

French diplomat

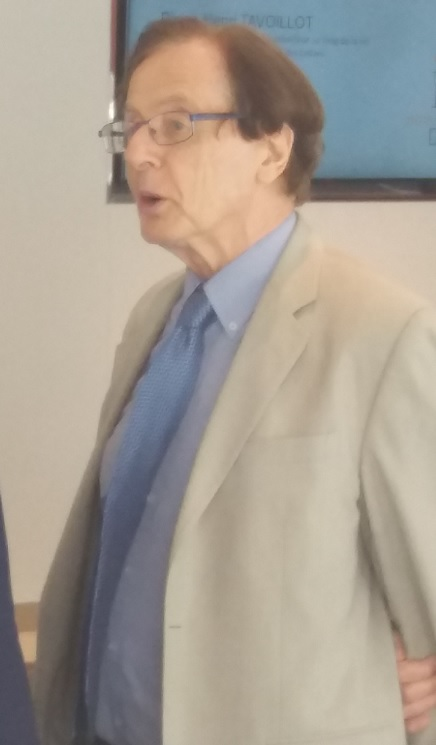
Image of Jean-Louis Gergorin

Jean-Louis Gergorin is a French cybersecurity expert, strategy consultant, former diplomat, and former executive vice president of EADS—the giant European aerospace company that controls and has been subsequently known as Airbus.
He was at the origin of the Clearstream 2 incident in France; a significant occurrence in French political life from 2006 to 2010. He was later found in this case guilty of slanderous denunciation, and use of forgery.

== Education ==
Gergorin was educated at two top French schools, the École Polytechnique and École Nationale d'Administration. Gergorin was also a research fellow at the RAND Corporation and Harvard Kennedy School and is a graduate of the Executive Education Program at Stanford Business School.

== Career ==
In 1973, Gergorin was cofounder and deputy head of the Policy Planning Staff of the French Foreign Ministry. From 1979 to 1984 he was Director of Policy Planning, reporting directly to the French Foreign Minister.

In November 1984 he joined the aerospace group Matra as Senior Vice President for Strategy, starting a close association with CEO Jean-Luc Lagardère that lasted until Lagardère's sudden death in March 2003. Between 1998 and 2000, together with Lagardère and Co-CEO Philippe Camus, Gergorin played a major role in the series of national and transnational mergers that led to the formation of EADS—the world's second largest aerospace company.

During his time at EADS, Gergorin served as Executive Vice President for Strategy, member of the executive committee, and as a member of the Shareholder's Committee (Board of Directors) for its Airbus subsidiary. In this final capacity, Gergorin was particularly active in the expansion of EADS in the U.S. and U.K. markets.

=== Strategy and Cybersecurity Consultant ===
On 26 April 2007, Jean-Louis Gergorin founded the company JLG Strategy, which provides strategy consulting focusing on the fields of aerospace, defense, and cybersecurity. In 2014, he founded and became a member of the steering committee of the French American Cybersecurity Conference. In November 2018, with Léo Isaac-Dognin, he published "Cyber, la guerre permanente", a book which offers a geopolitical analysis of both the main cyber incidents since the beginning of the 2000s and the stakes involved in the attacks. The book was reviewed in the French press at the time of its publication. He was invited to speak on these issues in 2019 and 2021 at the Word Policy Conference, an IFRI initiative; he also spoke at the Normandy World Forum for Peace in 2020 and 2021. In 2020, he joined the scientific committee of the International Cybersecurity Forum. From 2020 through early 2022, he co-authored four op-eds in the newspaper Le Monde with Bernard Barbier, former technical director at DGSE, and admiral Edouard Guillaud, former Chief of the Defense Staff of the French Armed Forces, about the current and future importance of cyber-related issues (e.g., the vital need for a national cyber strategy, the need to implement the concept of cybercoertion as a deterrent, the lack of preparation against cyber threats within Europe—highlighted namely by the Pegasus affair, and the need for Europe to stop being strategically impotent in particular by implementing a proactive deterrence and retaliation strategy against ransomware attacks). He has been quoted by the Washington Post on the Biden administration's evolving cyber doctrine.

== The Affaire Clearstream ==
=== Background ===
In May 2006, Gergorin admitted that he had anonymously sent a list of various political figures and businesspeople who were allegedly involved in a large money laundering scheme to the French Investigating Magistrate, Renaud Van Ruymbeke, in 2004. The case, known as Clearstream 2, was widely followed in the press in France, driven by the fact that the list contained the name of future French President, Nicolas Sarkozy (Sarkozy name was later found to have been added to the list). Gergorin has stated publicly that he and Magistrate Van Ruymbeke met and agreed on this course of action for security concerns.

Gergorin was subsequently put under investigation for transmitting these lists and the investigation proved that many of the names in Gergorin's transmission had been fabricated. This discovery caused Gergorin to leave his position at EADS.

Throughout this matter, Gergorin has maintained that he sent the information to the magistrate in good faith because he was totally convinced of the authenticity of his information and the truthfulness of his source—a mathematician turned computer expert named Imad Lahoud.

In 2007 Gergorin published a book named Rapacités (Greed) in which he publicly articulated his claim to have been a good faith whistleblower who was framed for his desire to understand the causes of the unexpected death of Lagardère.

=== Legal Rulings ===
==== January 28, 2010 Judgement of the Tribunal de Grande Instance (Higher District Court of First Instance) de Paris ====
On October 20, 2009, the public prosecutor requested an 18-month prison sentence and a €45,000 fine against Jean-Louis Gergorin. On January 28, 2010, he was found guilty of slanderous denunciation, use of forgery, concealment of breach of trust and theft, and sentenced to three years in prison—of which 21 months was suspended—and fined €40,000 by the Paris criminal court. Some salient excerpts from the judgment are below:

- "He is the initiator and the principal author of the crimes of slanderous denunciations. He used for this purpose documents of which he knew the fraudulent source and which he knew altered. He acted to satisfy personal interests (... ) it was quickly inhabited by an intention to harm, partly under the pernicious and harmful influence of Imad Lahoud".
- "Whereas JLG has particularly and repeatedly targeted victims who have become targets and otherwise adversaries in industrial rivalry; that his denunciations have considerably increased the devastating, even destructive, effect of the intention to harm him lived (...) and whose choice answered only one logic: that of giving credibility to its fight against a chimerical enemy by the use of data of which it knew the lying character".
- "Whereas JLG has been able to instrumentalize the authorities; that it has staged its steps, giving them an appearance of credibility and legitimacy (..) that the use of emblematic or easily accessible authorities, while knowing that the general Rondot, as the investigating judge acted in secrecy and compartmentalization, enabled JLG, the only one to master the labyrinthine process of slander, to continue his harmful work (...)
- "Whereas Jean-Louis Gergorin must be considered as fully responsible for his actions, which reveal a particularly harmful and disturbing personality due to an exceptional duplicity (...) that the exceptional extent of the scheme did as equal as the relentless determination thanks to which JLG, with the collaboration of Imad Lahoud, built his trap and the deep contempt in which they both held the ministerial and judicial authorities (...) to a prison sentence therefore appears justified"

==== September 14, 2011 ruling by the Paris Court of Appeal ====
The Paris Court of Appeals ruling was largely a confirmation of the first ruling, except regarding Mr. Gergorin. Relevant excerpts from the ruling include:

- The Court of Appeal did not follow the considerations of the first ruling which described him as the initiator and main author of the facts.
- Jean-Louis Gergorin was relieved of the charges of forgery and concealment, but also of the charge of use of slanderous accusation and forgeries concerning the documents delivered to General Rondot.
- The Court, however, confirmed the ruling concerning the charges of concealment of forgeries and slanderous accusation related to the documents sent to judge Renaud Van Ruymbeke after General Rondot failed to confirm the lists were genuine.
- The September 14, 2011 ruling shortened Mr. Gergorin's prison term—the 3-year term was confirmed, but the suspension portion of the sentence was increased to 30 months (from the original 21). The €40,000 fine was confirmed.

Jean-Louis Gergorin attempted to bring the case to the Cour de Cassation or Supreme Court for a final appeal, but the request was dismissed on February 27, 2013, making the September 14 ruling by the Paris Court of Appeal final

== Awards and activities ==
Gergorin has been the recipient of various honors and awards; most notably sharing the 1989 Aviation Week Laureate Award with Jean-Luc Lagardère and Philippe Camus. Gergorin was later inducted into the Aviation Week "Laureates Hall of Fame" at the Smithsonian Institution's National Air and Space Museum.

Gergorin spoke at the 1998 Bilderberg Meeting and was a guest at the 1997, 2002, and 2003 Bilderberg meetings.

Gergorin has also been credited as the organizer of "high-level" discussions concerning France's strained relationship with the United States after the reelection of George W. Bush to the Presidency of the United States.

The talks involved American diplomats including Henry Kissinger and Zbigniew Brzezinski as well as a "similarly illustrious" list of French officials.

== Current ==
Jean-Louis Gergorin has lectured at the Institut d'Études Politiques de Paris.

He is a member of Institut Aspen.
