= William C. Richardson =

President of Johns Hopkins University (1940–2021)

William Chase Richardson (May 11, 1940 – May 18, 2021) received a Bachelor of Arts degree from Trinity College (Connecticut) and a Master in Business Administration degree (1964) and a Ph.D. from the University of Chicago (1971).

Richardson was previously graduate dean and vice provost for research at the University of Washington (1981-1984), executive vice president and provost at Pennsylvania State University (1984–1990), and held various positions at the University of Chicago. He later became president of Johns Hopkins University (1990–1995). Richardson devoted his academic career to researching the financing and organization of health services in the USA.

While at Johns Hopkins, Richardson made efforts to update the curriculum, diversify the student body and faculty, increase cooperation between academic divisions, and secure the school's financial position. Enrollment increased by 1995 to a record 16,330 and a new capital campaign launched, intended to raise $900 million. African-American and Hispanic enrollment doubled in his five years as president.

Richardson left academia to head the Kellogg Foundation (1995–2005) and became chair and co-trustee of The Kellogg Foundation Trust (1996–2007). Richardson has also been a director on the boards of the Kellogg Company (1996–2007), the Bank of New York (1998–2007), Exelon Corporation (2005-2016), CSX Corporation (1992–2008), and Mercantile Bankshares. He was succeeded at the Kellogg Foundation in January 2006 by Sterling Speirn.

He was elected a member of the Institute of Medicine, National Academy of Sciences in 1981. He is best known for his role as chair of the groundbreaking report on medical errors ("To Err Is Human: Building a Safer Health System") and a following report on quality of health care in America ("Crossing the Quality Chasm: A New Health System for the 21st Century"). He won its David Rall Award in 2007. (The David Rall Medal is awarded to a member of the Institute of Medicine who has demonstrated particularly distinguished leadership as a chair of a study committee or other such activities in a manner that was particularly exemplary, demonstrating a commitment substantially above and beyond the usual expectations of a committee chair.)
