= Policy Planning Staff (France) =

French think tank

The Centre for Analysis, Planning and Strategy (Centre d’analyse, de prévision et de stratégie, or CAPS, formerly known as Centre d'analyse et de prévision (or Centre for Analysis and Planning), and then as Direction de la prospective (or Directorate for Foresight) is a think tank within the French Ministry of Foreign Affairs, tasked with making strategic recommendations to the Foreign Minister and ensuring a French presence in European and international debates and institutions. It is the French counterpart to the US State Department’s Policy Planning Staff. It is currently headed by diplomat Manuel Lafont Rapnouil, who was appointed by Foreign Minister Jean-Yves Le Drian in July 2019.

== Status ==
The director of the CAPS reports directly to the Minister and is sometimes a member of his cabinet. The CAPS is tasked with performing three tasks with complete independence of approach and expression:

- analysing the evolutions of international relations and the larger problems which weigh on them in the middle and in the long term, notably economic, religious and demographic issues, all the while seeking to shed light on them from an approach combining multiple social sciences as well as foresight;
- recommending to the Minister, either on his instructions or under its own steam, such action or strategic options as it deems necessary with regard to the development of the international situation in the long term;
- ensuring that the relationship between the administration and the academic world is well oiled, by presenting administration officials with research relevant to their work and also by emphasising the importance of French institutions abroad.

In spite of its small size, the Centre enjoys a solid reputation and has become known internationally for being a source of intellectual and diplomatic talent.

Its PIPA program (Programme d’invitation des personnalités d’avenir – an invitation program for young foreign leaders), established in 1989, which hosts about 75 young leaders (under 45) a year, seeks to present the select few who are chosen with an unvarnished image of contemporary France and establish friendly ties with them. Since its creation, the program has hosted over 2,000 personalities from over 150 countries.

== Independence ==
The CAPS is made quite unique by the diversity of its team: it is made up of career diplomats, but also civil servants from different ministries, most often Defence and Finance, academics and other experts. Its specificity is particularly marked in the manner with which its team handles topics: indeed, its officials frequently assess situations by using data that originates out of the traditional diplomatic channels, whether in universities, think tanks or specialised services at home or abroad. It also has the resources necessary to commission expert analyses from external sources.

This makes it a source of independent and sometimes critical analyses vis-à-vis the government’s policies. It is for instance mentioned for its dissenting analyses, carried out by external consultants, in the Duclert report on France, Rwanda and the Tutsi genocide. Its mission is also to present alternatives and new options and ideas. It has a certain liberty of speech outside of the administration, and its members frequently publish and partake in conferences, activities which serve to heighten its status on the international scene.

== History ==
The Centre d’analyse et de prévision, as it was first called, was set up on 18 May 1974 by then-Foreign Minister Michel Jobert, who wanted to implement some institutionalised out-of-the-box thought. The decree establishing its existence states its purpose as “contributing to the preparation of decisions in foreign affairs” by “analysing current situations” and “conducting attempts at foreseeing future evolutions”. Despite having changed names two times since then, it has remained a constant source of doctrine for ministers.

== Directors ==
The CAPS has a history of renowned directors, either academics or career diplomats.

- Thierry de Montbrial (1974-1978)
- Jean-Louis Gergorin (1979-1984)
- Philippe Coste (1984-1989)
- Jean-Marie Guéhenno (1989-1993)
- Bruno Racine (1993-1995)
- Gilles Andréani (1995-1999, 2002-2004)
- Michel Foucher (1999-2002)
- Pierre Lévy (2005-2010)
- Marie Mendras (2010)
- Joseph Maïla (2010-2013)
- Justin Vaïsse (2013-2019)
- Manuel Lafont Rapnouil (2019-)
