= Claude Lefort =

French philosopher

- Born: 21 April 1924; Paris, France
- Died: 3 October 2010 (aged 86); Paris, France
- Other name: "Claude Montal"
- Political party: See list: PCI – Chaulieu–Montal Tendency (1944–1948); Socialisme ou Barbarie (1949–1958); ILO (1958–1960)

Education
- Education: University of Paris (B.A., 1944); University of Paris I (Ph.D., 1971)
- Doctoral advisor: Raymond Aron
- Other advisors: Henri Gouhier; Maurice Merleau-Ponty

Philosophical work
- Era: Contemporary philosophy
- Region: Western philosophy
- School: Continental philosophy Western Marxism (1942–1958); Libertarian socialism (1946–1958); Anti-totalitarian left (after 1958)
- Institutions: University of São Paulo; University of Paris; University of Caen; EHESS
- Main interests: Political philosophy, phenomenology
- Notable ideas: Criticism of Soviet bureaucracy Democracy as the system characterized by the institutionalization of conflict within society Totalitarianism as the abolition of the separation between state and society

Claude Lefort (/ləˈfɔːr/; French: [ləfɔʁ]; 21 April 1924 – 3 October 2010) was a French philosopher and activist.

He was politically active by 1942 under the influence of his tutor, the phenomenologist Maurice Merleau-Ponty (whose posthumous publications Lefort later edited). In 1944, he joined the Trotskyist Parti Communiste Internationaliste.

Lefort was impressed by Cornelius Castoriadis when he first met him. From 1946, he collaborated with him in the Chaulieu–Montal Tendency, so called after their pseudonyms "Pierre Chaulieu" (Castoriadis) and "Claude Montal" (Lefort). In August 1946, they published "On the Regime and Against the Defense of the USSR", a critique of both Stalinism and the Trotskyist degenerated workers' state theory. They suggested that the USSR was dominated by a social layer of bureaucrats, and that it consisted of a new kind of society as aggressive as Western European societies. By 1948, having tried to persuade other Trotskyists of their viewpoint, they broke away with about a dozen others and founded the libertarian socialist group Socialisme ou Barbarie. Lefort's text "L'Expérience prolétarienne" (1952) was important in shifting the group's focus towards forms of self-organization.

For a time, Lefort wrote for both the journal Socialisme ou Barbarie and for Les Temps Modernes. His involvement in the latter journal ended after a published debate during 1952–54 over Jean-Paul Sartre's article The Communists and Peace. Lefort was for a long time uncomfortable with Socialisme ou Barbarie's "organizationalist" tendencies. In 1958, he, Henri Simon and others left Socialisme ou Barbarie and formed the group Information et Liaisons Ouvrières.

In his academic career, Lefort taught at the University of São Paulo, at the Sorbonne and at the École des Hautes Études en Sciences Sociales (EHESS), being affiliated to the Centre de recherches politiques Raymond Aron. He has written on the early modern political writers Niccolò Machiavelli and Étienne de La Boétie and explored "the Totalitarian enterprise" in its "denial of social division... [and] of the difference between the order of power, the order of law and the order of knowledge".

== Biography ==
Lefort became a Marxist in his youth under the influence of his teacher at the Lycée Carnot in Paris, the phenomenologist Maurice Merleau-Ponty. By 1943, he was organising a Trotskyist clandestine cell at the Lycée Henri-IV in Paris. He then studied at the Sorbonne. In 1944, he wrote his Licence ès lettres (roughly equivalent to a B.A.) thesis on Spinoza under Henri Gouhier.

In 1944, he also joined the Trotskyist Parti Communiste Internationaliste (PCI). In 1946, he met Cornelius Castoriadis who came to Paris from Athens, Greece. Right away, they formed a faction in the PCI called "Chaulieu–Montal Tendency", that left the party and became the Socialisme ou Barbarie group and which, in 1949, started a journal with this name.

Socialisme ou Barbarie considered the USSR to be an example of state capitalism and gave its support to anti-bureaucratic revolts in the Eastern Bloc—especially the uprising in Budapest in 1956. Differences of opinion brought about a schism within Socialisme ou Barbarie, and Lefort sided with Henri Simon, one of the founders of the group Information et Liaisons Ouvrières (ILO; "Workers' Information and Liaisons")—later renamed "Informations et Correspondance Ouvrières" ("Workers' Information and Correspondence")—in 1958. Two years later, he abandoned the idea and ideology of political revolution and ceased his militant activism.

After having worked in other places, in 1947 and 1948 for UNESCO, in 1949 Lefort passed the agrégation in philosophy: he taught at the high school in Nîmes (1950) and in Reims (1951). In 1951, he was recruited as a sociology assistant at the Sorbonne by Georges Gurvitch. In 1952 (following a dispute with Gurvitch), he was detached from the sociology section of the CNRS until 1966, with a break of two years (1953–1954), when he was professor of philosophy at the University of São Paulo (Brazil). As for the CNRS, the support of Raymond Aron (whom he met around 1952) led to his recruitment as a teacher of sociology at the University of Caen, where he worked from 1966 to 1971, the year when he defended his doctoral thesis at the University of Paris I, Le Travail de l'œuvre: Machiavel, which was a commentary on the work of Machiavelli. That same year, he was again hired as a researcher in the sociology section of the CNRS until 1976, when he joined the École des Hautes Études en Sciences Sociales (EHESS), where he stayed until his retirement in 1989.

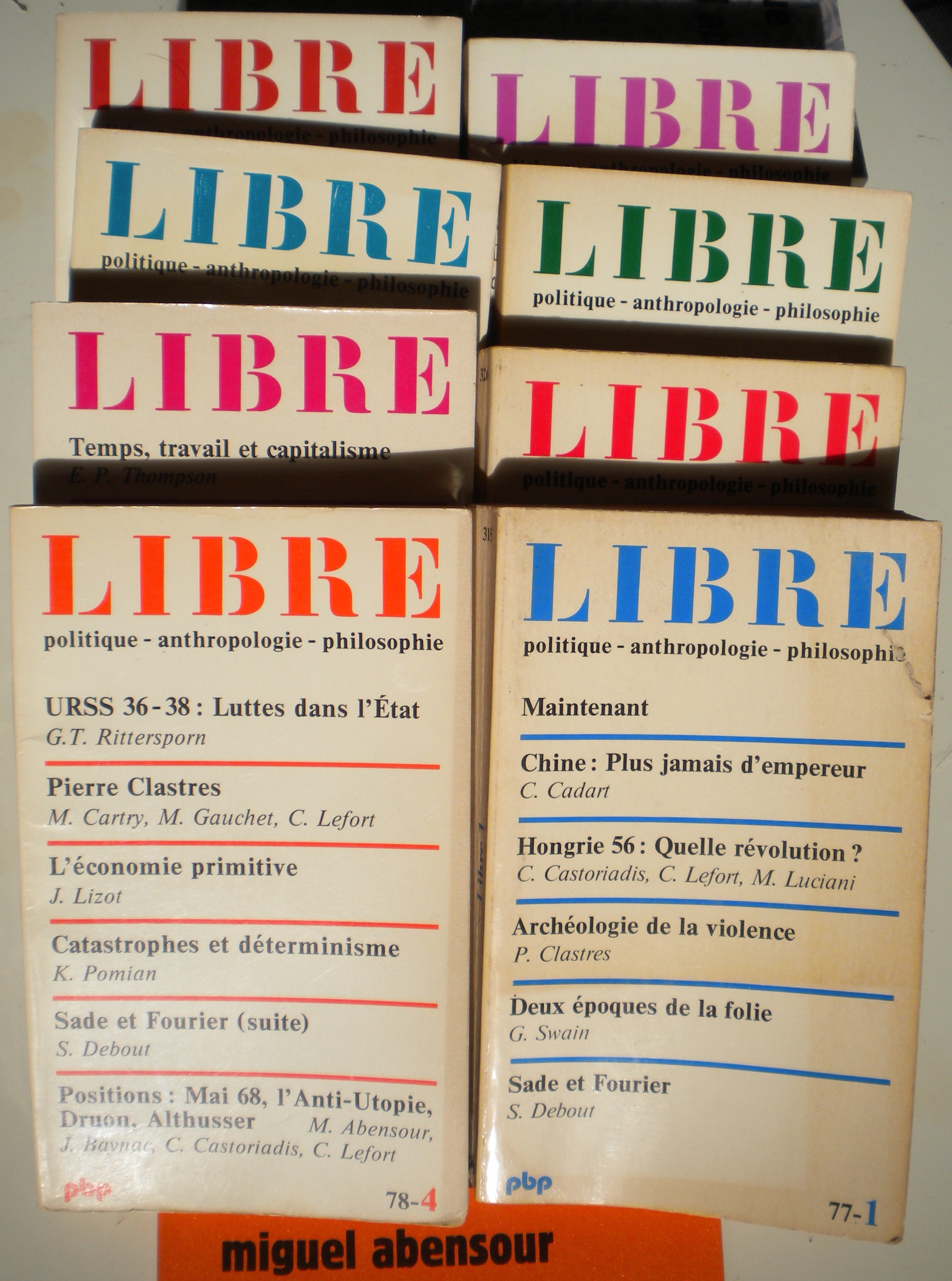
The journal Libre

The intellectual work of Lefort is strongly tied to his participation, often tension-filled, in successive journals. With Les Temps Modernes (introduced to him by Merleau-Ponty), he took part in the "gatherings of collaborators" and wrote from 1945 until his debate with Jean-Paul Sartre in 1953. In Socialisme ou Barbarie (which lasted from 1949 to 1967 and of which he was the co-founder), he was active until 1950, then from 1955 to 1958. He was also involved in the philosophy journal Textures (established in 1969) from 1971 to the end (1975) and there he brought in Castoriadis and Miguel Abensour. With them (as well as Pierre Clastres and Marcel Gauchet), he created the political journal Libre in 1977, which was published up until 1980, when there were some disagreements with Castoriadis as well as with Gauchet. From 1982 to 1984, he led the intellectual review Passé-Present, where, amongst others, Miguel Abensour, Carlos Semprún Maura, Claude Mouchard and Pierre Pachet participated. These last two, as well as Claude Habib, formed the reading committee of the book series Littérature et Politique that Lefort founded for the publisher Éditions Belin in 1987.

No doubt he assigned less importance to the research centers at which he had participated in EHESS: the CECMAS (Centre for the Study of Mass Communications), founded by Georges Friedmann and which welcomed Edgar Morin, then the Centre Aron, which he frequented just before his death.

When Merleau-Ponty died in 1961, Lefort took charge of the publication of his manuscripts. In the 1970s, he developed an analysis of bureaucratic regimes of Eastern Europe. He read The Gulag Archipelago and published a book on Aleksandr Solzhenitsyn. His main ideas on Stalinist totalitarianism were published in 1981 in a collection titled L'Invention démocratique.

== Philosophical work ==
=== Conception of totalitarianism ===
Lefort was part of the political theorists who put forward the relevance of a notion of totalitarianism which was relevant to Stalinism as well as fascism, and considered totalitarianism as different in its essence from the big categories used in the Western world since ancient Greece, like the notions of dictatorship or tyranny. However, contrary to the authors like Hannah Arendt who limited the notion to Nazi Germany and the Soviet Union between 1936 and 1953, Lefort applied it to the regimes of Eastern Europe in the second half of the century, that is, to an era when terror, a central element of totalitarianism for the other authors, had lost its most extreme dimensions.

It is in the study of these regimes, and the reading of The Gulag Archipelago (1973) by Aleksandr Solzhenitsyn, where he developed his analysis of totalitarianism.

==== The double fence society ====
Lefort characterizes the totalitarian system by a "double fence (double clôture). Totalitarianism abolishes the separation between state and society and the political power permeates society, and all preexisting human relations (class solidarity, professional or religious cooperations) tend to be replaced with a one-dimensional hierarchy between those who order and those who obey. This is made possible especially through the association between the state and the party hierarchy which is always very close, so that the party hierarchy becomes the effective power. Lefort, like other theorists, thus identifies the destruction of public space and its fusion with political power as a key element of totalitarianism. Moreover, totalitarianism denies what Lefort calls "the principle of internal divisions of society", and its conception of society is marked by "the affirmation of the totality". Every organization, association or profession is thus subordinated to the planning of the state. The differences of opinion, one of the values of democracy, are abolished so that the entire social body is directed towards the same goal; even personal tastes become politicized and must be standardized. The aim of totalitarianism is to create a united and closed society, in which the components are not individuals and which is defined completely by the same goals, the same opinions and the same practices. Stalinism thus knew the "identification of the people to the proletariat, of the proletariat to the party, of the party to the management, of the management to the 'Égocrate'".

Lefort demonstrates the central difference between totalitarianism and dictatorship: a dictatorship can admit competing transcendental principles, like religion; the ideology of the totalitarian party is religion. A dictatorship does not aim for the destruction and absorption of society, and a dictatorial power is a power of the state against society, that presupposes the distinction of the two; the plan of a totalitarian party is to merge state with society in a closed, united and uniform system, subordinated under the fulfilment of a plan—"socialism" in the case of the USSR. Lefort calls this system "people-one": "The process of identification of power and society, the process of homogenization of the social space, the process of the closing up of society and the authority to enchain it in order to constitute the totalitarian system."

==== The organicist vision of society ====
The totalitarian system, unified and organized, presents itself like a body, the "social body": "dictatorship, bureaucracy and apparatus need a new system of bodies". Lefort returns to the theories of Ernst Kantorowicz on the "two bodies of the king", in which the person of the totalitarian leader, besides his physical and mortal body, is a political body representing the one-people. In order to ensure its proper functioning and to maintain its unity, the totalitarian system requires an Other, "the evil other", a representation of the exterior, the enemy, against which the party combats, "the representative of the forces of the old society (kulaks, bourgeois), [...] the emissary of the stranger, of the imperialistic world".

The division between the interior and the exterior, between the One-people and the Other, is the only division that totalitarianism tolerates, since it is founded upon this division. Lefort insists on the fact that "the constitution of the One-people necessitates the incessant production of enemies" and also speaks of their "invention". For example, Stalin prepared to attack the Jews of the USSR when he died, i.e., designing a new enemy, and in the same way, Mussolini had declared that bourgeois would be eliminated in Italy after World War II.

The relation between the one-people and the Other is a prophylactic command: the enemy is a "parasite to eliminate", a "waste". This exceeds the simple rhetorical effect that was commonly used in the contemporary political discourse, yet in an underlying way, it is part of the metaphorical vision of the totalitarian society as a body. This vision described how the presence of state enemies within the population itself was perceived as a kind of illness. The violence roused against them was, in this organicist metaphor, a fever, a symptom of the fight of the social body against the illness, in the sense that "the campaign against the enemy is feverish: the fever is good, it's the sign, in the society, of the evil to counteract".

The situation of the totalitarian leader within this system is paradoxical and uncertain, for he is at the same time a part of the system (its head, who commands the rest) and the representation of the system (everything). He is therefore the incarnation of the "one-power", i.e., the power executed in all parts of the "one-people".

==== The fragility of the system ====
Lefort didn't consider totalitarianism as a situation of an ideal type, which could potentially be realized through terror and extermination. He rather sees in it a set of processes which have endings that cannot be known, thus their success cannot be determined. If the will of the totalitarian party to realize the perfect unity of the social body controls the magnitude of its actions, this also implies that the goal is impossible to achieve because its development necessarily leads to contradictions and oppositions. "Totalitarianism is a regime with a prevailing sense of being gnawed away by the absurdity of its own ambition (total control by the party) and the active or passive resistance of those subjected to it," summarized the political scientist Dominique Colas.

=== Conception of democracy ===
Claude Lefort formulates his conception of democracy by mirroring his conception of totalitarianism, developing it in the same way by analyzing Eastern European regimes and the USSR. For Lefort democracy is the form of society characterized by the institutionalization of conflict within society, the division of social body; it recognizes and even considers legitimate the existence of divergent interests, conflicting opinions, and visions of the world that are opposed and even incompatible. Lefort's vision makes the disappearance of the leader as a political body—the putting to death of the king, as Kantorowicz calls it—the founding moment of democracy because it makes the seat of power, hitherto occupied by an eternal substance transcending the mere physical existence of monarchs, into an "empty space" where groups with shared interests and opinions can succeed each other, but only for a time and at the will of elections. Power is no longer tied to any specific programme, goal, or proposal; it is nothing but a collection of instruments put temporarily at the disposal of those who win a majority. "In Lefort's invented and inventive democracy," writes Dominique Colas, "power comes from the people and belongs to no one."

Democracy is thus a regime marked by its vagueness, its incompleteness, against which totalitarianism establishes itself. This leads Lefort to regard as democratic every form of opposition and protest against totalitarianism. Opposition and protest, in a way, create a democratic space within the totalitarian system. Democracy is innovation, the start of new social and political movements, the designation of new issues in the struggle against oppression, it is a "creative power capable of weakening, even slaying the totalitarian Leviathan". A Leviathan whose paradoxical frailty Lefort emphasizes.

Lefort does not reject representative democracy, but does not limit democracy to it. For instance, he includes the social movements in the sphere of legitimate political debate.

== Publications ==
- La Brèche, en collaboration avec Edgar Morin, P. Coudray (pseudonym of Cornelius Castoriadis), Fayard, Paris, 1968.
- Éléments d'une critique de la bureaucratie, Droz, Genève, 1971. 2nd edition with Gallimard, Paris, 1979.
- "The Age of Novelty". Telos 29 (Fall 1976). Telos Press, New York.
- Le Travail de l'œuvre, Machiavel, Gallimard, Paris, 1972 (republ., coll. « Tel », 1986).
- Un Homme en trop. Essai sur l'archipel du goulag de Soljénitsyne, Le Seuil, Paris, 1975 (republ., Le Seuil, 1986).
- Les Formes de l'histoire, Gallimard, Paris, 1978.
- Sur une colonne absente. Autour de Merleau-Ponty, Gallimard, Paris, 1978.
- L'Invention démocratique. Les Limites de la domination totalitaire, Fayard, Paris, 1981.
- Essais sur le politique : XIX^{e} et XX^{e} siècles, Seuil, Paris, 1986.
- Écrire à l'épreuve du politique, Calmann-Lévy, Paris, 1992.
- La Complication, Fayard, Paris, 1999.
- Les Formes de l'histoire. Essais d'anthropologie politique, Gallimard, Paris, «Folio Essais», 2000.
- Le Temps présent, Belin, Paris, 2007.

=== English translations ===
- The Political Forms of Modern Society: Bureaucracy, Democracy, Totalitarianism (MIT Press, 1986).
- Democracy and Political Theory (MIT Press, 1989).
- Writing: The Political Test (Duke University Press, 2000).
- Complications: Communism and the Dilemmas of Democracy (Columbia University Press, 2007).
- Machiavelli in the Making (Northwestern University Press, 2012).
- "Proletarian Experience (1952)", Viewpoint Magazine 3 (September 2013).

== Sources ==
- Anonymous (1976). "An interview with Claude Lefort". Telos. 1976 (30): 173–192. doi:10.3817/1276030173. S2CID 219190998.
- Colas, Dominique (1986). "Lefort Claude, 1924– : L'Ιnvention démocratique. Les limites de la domination totalitaire, 1981". In François Châtelet; Olivier Duhamel; Évelyne Pisier (eds.). Dictionnaire des œuvres politiques. Quadrige / Référence. Vol. 329 (4th ed.). Paris: Presses universitaires de France. pp. 585–591. ISBN 2-13-051878-8.
- Le Baut, Hervé (2011). Présence de Maurice Merleau-Ponty. L'Harmattan. ISBN 9782296446670.
- Lefort, Claude (1981). L'Ιnvention démocratique. Les limites de la domination totalitaire. Paris: Fayard.
- Lefort, Claude (2000). "Philosopher?". Writing: The Political Test. Duke University Press. pp. 236–251. ISBN 0-8223-2520-9.
- Merleau-Ponty, Maurice (1968). The Visible and the Invisible. Northwestern University Press. ISBN 2-07-028625-8.
