= Precursors to anarchism =

Forerunners of the anti-authoritarian ideology

Prior to the rise of anarchism as an anti-authoritarian political philosophy in the 19th century, both individuals and groups expressed some principles of anarchism in their lives and writings.

== Antiquity ==
The longest period of human existence - before recorded history - lacked a separate class of established authority or formal political institutions. Long before anarchism emerged as a distinct perspective, human beings lived for thousands of years in self-governing societies without a special ruling or political class. It was only after the rise of hierarchical societies that anarchist ideas were formulated as a critical response to and rejection of coercive political institutions and hierarchical social relationships.

=== Ancient China ===
Taoism, a school of thought which developed in ancient China, has been embraced by some anarchists as a source of anarchistic attitudes. The Taoist sages Lao Tzu (fl. c. 5th century BCE) and Zhuang Zhou (c. 369 to c. 286 BCE) whose philosophy was rather based on an "anti-polity" stance and rejection of any kind of involvement in political movements or organisations, developed a philosophy of "non-rule" in the Zhuang Zhou and the Tao Te Ching, and many Taoists in response lived an anarchic lifestyle. There is an ongoing debate whether exhorting rulers not to rule belongs to the sphere of anarchism. A new generation of Taoist thinkers with anarchic leanings appeared during the chaotic Wei-Jin period of 220 to 420 CE. Among them were Bao Jingyan, who authored the proto-anarchist treatise Neither Lord Nor Subject.

Taoist principles were akin to philosophical anarchism, trying to delegitimate the state and question its morality. Taoism and neo-Taoism were pacifist schools of thought, in contrast with many of their Western anarchist counterparts some centuries later.

=== Ancient Greece ===
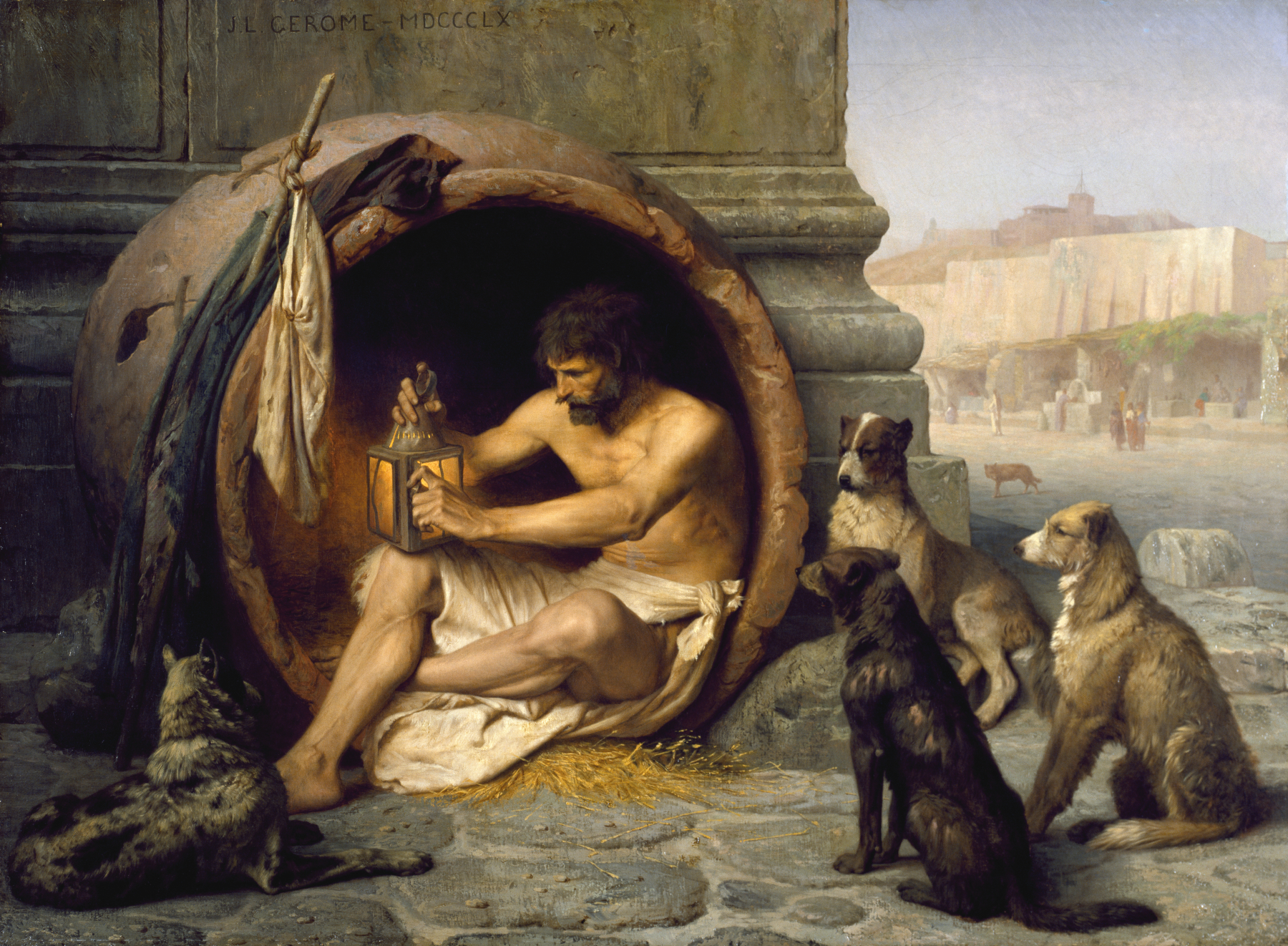
Diogenes of Sinope advocated anarchistic forms of society

Some convictions and ideas deeply held by modern anarchists were first expressed in ancient Greece. The first known political usage of the word anarchy (Note: The usage of the words anarchia and anarchos, both meaning "without ruler", can be traced back to Homer's Iliad and Herodotus's Histories.) appears in the play Seven Against Thebes by Aeschylus, dated to 467 BC. There, Antigone openly refuses to abide by the rulers' decree to leave her brother Polyneices' body unburied as punishment for his participation in the attack on Thebes. Sophocles used the same theme 50 years later, in his tragedy Antigone, where the heroine challenges the established order of Thebes, coming in direct conflict with the established authority of the town.

Ancient Greece also saw the first Western instance of anarchic philosophical ideals, including those of the Cynics and Stoics. The Cynics Diogenes of Sinope (died 323 BCE) and Crates of Thebes (c. 365 – c. 285 BCE) are both supposed to have advocated anarchistic forms of society, although little remains of their writings. Their most significant contribution was the radical approach of nomos (law) and physis (nature). Contrary to the rest of Greek philosophy (which aimed to blend nomos and physis in harmony), Cynics dismissed nomos (and in consequence: the authorities, hierarchies, establishments and moral code of the polis) while promoting a way of life, based solely on physis. Zeno of Citium (c. 334 – c. 262 BCE), the founder of Stoicism, who was much influenced by the Cynics, described his vision of an egalitarian utopian society around 300 BC. Zeno's Republic advocates an anarchic form of society in which there is no need for state structures. He argued that although the necessary instinct of self-preservation leads humans to egotism, nature has supplied a corrective to it by providing man with another instinct, namely sociability. Like many modern anarchists, he believed that if people follow their instincts, they will have no need of law courts or police, no temples and no public worship and will use no money (free gifts taking the place of the exchanges).

Socrates, as appropriate to anarchism, constantly questioned authority and centred his philosophy upon every man's right to freedom of consciousness. Aristippus, a pupil of Socrates and founder of the Hedonistic school, claimed that he wished neither to rule nor be ruled, and also he saw the state as a danger to personal autonomy. Not all in ancient Greece had anarchic tendencies, though. Other philosophers such as Plato and Aristotle used the term 'anarchy' negatively in association with democracy, which they mistrusted as inherently vulnerable and prone to deteriorate into tyranny.

== Middle Ages ==
=== Medieval Asia ===
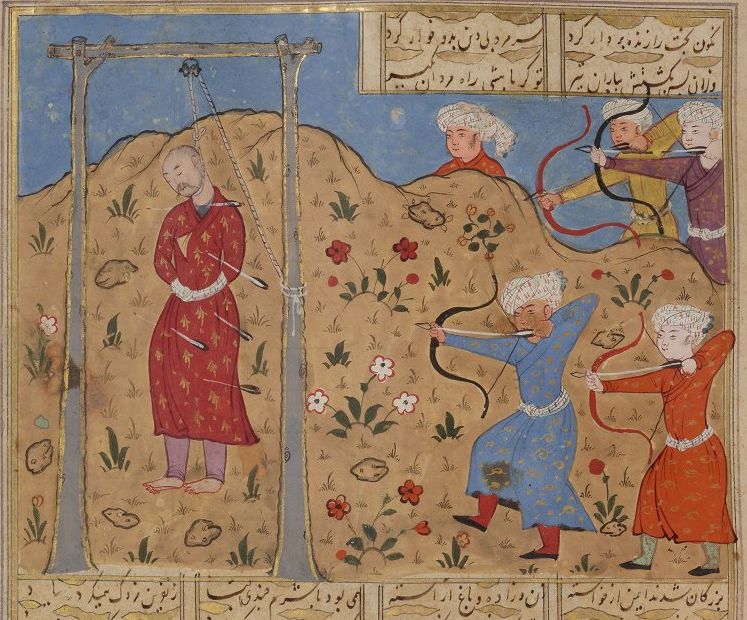
The execution of Mazdak, an anarchist precursor in the Middle East, whose followers faced the same fate

In medieval Persia, Mazdak, a Zoroastrian prophet and heretic now considered a proto-socialist, called for free love, abolition of private property and overthrow of the king. He saw sharing as a religious duty and that no one should have more than others, though sources dispute whether he advocated communal ownership or redistribution. The latter claim being that he gave land, possessions, women and slaves from the rich to the poor. He and his thousands of followers were massacred in 582 CE but his teaching went on to influence Islamic sects of the following centuries.

A theological form on anarchic Islam developed in Basra and Baghdad among Mu'tazilite ascetics and Najdiyya Kharijites. This Islamic tendency was not communist or egalitarian and did not resemble current concepts of anarchism, but preached that the state was harmful, illegitimate, immoral and unnecessary.

=== Medieval Europe ===
In Europe, Christianity was overshadowing all aspects of life. Brethren of the Free Spirit was the most notable example of heretic belief that had some vaguely anarchic tendencies. They held anticleric sentiments and believed in total freedom. Even though most of their ideas were individualistic, the movement had a social impact, influencing riots and rebellions in Europe for years to come. Other anarchistic religious movements in Europe during the Middle Ages, include the Hussites, Adamites and the early Anabaptists.

== Early modern era ==
20th century historian James Joll describes anarchist history as two opposing sides. One, the zealotic and ascitic religious movements of the Middle Ages which rejected institutions, laws, and the established order. The other, the theories of the 18th century based on rationalism and logic. According to Joll, these two currents later blended to form a contradictory movement that nonetheless resonated to a very broad audience.

=== Renaissance ===
With the spread of the Renaissance across Europe, anti-authoritarian and secular ideas re-emerged, in response to the growing centralization of power by absolute monarchies. The most prominent thinkers advocating for liberty, mainly French, were employing Utopia in their works, to bypass strict state censorship. In Gargantua and Pantagruel (1532–1552), François Rabelais wrote of the Abby of Thelema (Greek word meaning "will" or "wish"), an imaginary utopia whose motto was "Do as Thou Will". Around the same time, the French law student Etienne de la Boetie wrote his Discourse on Voluntary Servitude in which he argued that tyranny resulted from voluntary submission and could be abolished by the people refusing to obey the authorities above them. Later, still in France, Gabriel de Foigny perceived a Utopia with freedom-loving people without government and no need of religion, as he wrote in The Southern Land, Known. Geneva authorities jailed Foigny for that book. François Fénelon also used Utopia to project his political views, in a book (Telemaque) that infuriated Louis XIV.

In Italy, Niccolò Machiavelli also is said by Paul McLaughlin to have laid some foundations for modern anarchism, particularly in his development of political science. Machiavelli's subversion of political ethics was adopted by classical anarchists such as Mikhail Bakunin, who explicitly declared "Machiavelli was right". (Note: In The Immorality of the State, Mikhail Bakunin wrote about Machiavelli's understanding "that the great and powerful States could be founded and maintained only by crime", as "what is permitted to the State is forbidden to the individual.") However, anarchism was constructed as a political philosophy to fundamentally question the legitimacy of political systems and offer alternatives, itself raising ethical questions of political justice. Bakunin thus elaborated on this departure of anarchism from Machiavellianism:

we are the sons of the Revolution and we have inherited from it the Religion of Humanity which we have to found upon the ruins of the Religion of Divinity. We believe in the rights of man, in the dignity and necessary emancipation of the human species. We believe in human liberty and human fraternity based upon human justice.

=== Early Protestantism ===
Some Reformation currents (like radical reformist movement of Anabaptists) are sometimes accredited as the religious forerunners of modern anarchism. Even though it was a religious revolution and strengthened the state, it also opened the road for the humanistic values of the French Revolution. During the English Civil War, Christian anarchism found one of its most articulate forerunners in Gerrard Winstanley, who was part of the Diggers movement. Winstanley published a pamphlet calling for communal ownership and social and economic organization in small agrarian communities. Drawing on the Bible, he argued that "the blessings of the earth" should "be common to all" and "none Lord over others". The Levellers and John Lilburne were noted to have opposed authority "in all its forms and aspects", which resulted in Lilburne's exile and later imprisonment by the Protectorate of Oliver Cromwell.

In the New World, religious dissenter Roger Williams founded the colony of Providence, Rhode Island after being run out of the theocratic Puritan Massachusetts Bay Colony in 1636. Unlike the Puritans, he scrupulously purchased land from local American Indians for his settlement. Williams' disciple William Harris, was described by the French individualist anarchist Émile Armand as having "thundered against the immorality of all earthly powers, and against the crime of all punishment," leading Armand to ask if he was "a mystical visionary or an isolated anarchist?" The Quaker sect, mostly because of their pantheism, had some anarchic tendencies—values that would later influence Benjamin Tucker. The first to use the term "anarchy" to mean something other than chaos was Louis-Armand, Baron de Lahontan in his Nouveaux voyages dans l'Amérique septentrionale (New Voyages in Northern America, 1703), where he described the indigenous American society which had no state, laws, prisons, priests or private property as being in anarchy. William Blake has also been said to espouse an anarchistic political position.

=== Age of Enlightenment ===
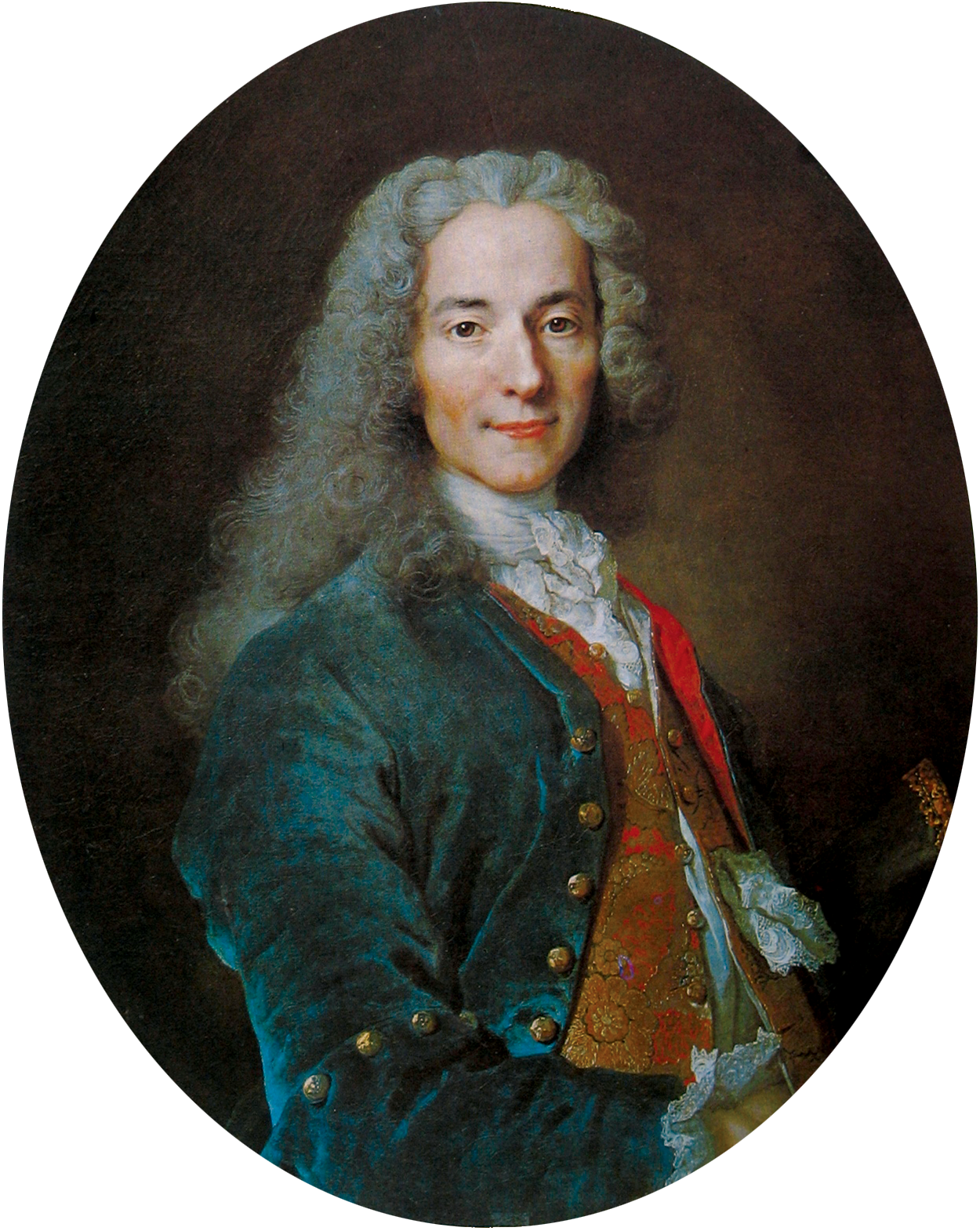
Voltaire

The Scientific Revolution had given thinkers of the time the confidence that humans could reason for themselves and when nature was tamed through science, society could be set free. Developing from the earlier thought of the Renaissance, the Age of Enlightenment saw a further eruption of secular and humanistic thought, spurred on by the foundation of rationalism by René Descartes. The prevailing mood of rationalism at the time was summed up by philosopher Denis Diderot, when he declared: "everything must be examined, everything must be shaken up, without exception and without circumspection." Central to the thought of this new generation of philosophers was the idea of man's inherently progressive nature, that people were not bound by sin and could improve in the right circumstances, namely through education. Inspired by the liberalism of John Locke, the French philosopher Voltaire openly opposed absolutism and advocated instead for constitutionalism. Voltaire's anti-authoritarianism was carried further by Denis Diderot, who privately mused on societies without laws or governments, and Jean-Jacques Rousseau, who argued that human nature was fundamentally good and that people had only become corrupted by unjust institutions.

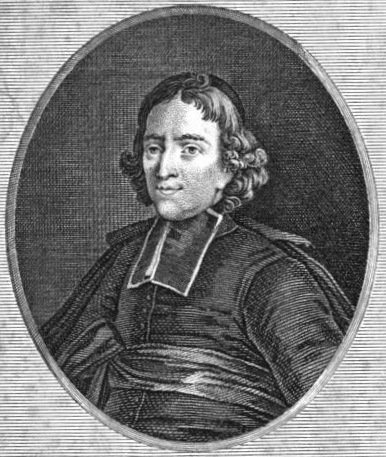
Jean Meslier

Ideas approaching anarchism were developed by Jean Meslier and Étienne-Gabriel Morelly, who extended the enlightenment criticisms of absolutism to all institutions. Meslier, a Catholic priest, privately wrote a Testament that denounced all religion as being actively harmful to people, espousing a revolutionary atheist philosophy that called for the abolition of economic inequalities and coercive laws. "More of an anarchist than an atheist", he analyzed the troubles of humankind as being due to individuals' desire to command and control others, either from political or clerical positions, and called for the poor to overthrow both church and state in a violent social revolution. The Testament went on to influence Voltaire, who expanded on Meslier's anti-clerical critiques in his Dictionnaire philosophique and on his anti-authoritarianism in Candide. These critiques found further expression in The System of Nature by Baron d'Holbach, who put forward a materialistic philosophy that rejected religion and upheld the scientific method, which he believed would lead to the maximization of happiness. In later works, he advocated the minimization of government and the establishment in its place of a utilitarian social contract between citizens.

In his Code de la nature, Morelly denounced the systems of private property and social stratification as unnatural. He believed in the goodness of human nature, which he argued had been corrupted by institutions that transformed an individual's enlightened self-interest into selfishness. He concluded by advocating for a return from man-made laws to natural law, and for the restitution of communal and personal property rights. In his argument for the abolition of private property, Morelly espoused an early form of communism. His communist society, governed by "natural law", mandated compulsory education and labor, centered the role of the family in society, and had a minimal government in place solely to oversee the economy and punish dissenters. Morelly's communism went on to inspire the revolutionary François-Noël Babeuf and utopian Charles Fourier, as well as the anarchists Pierre-Joseph Proudhon and Peter Kropotkin.

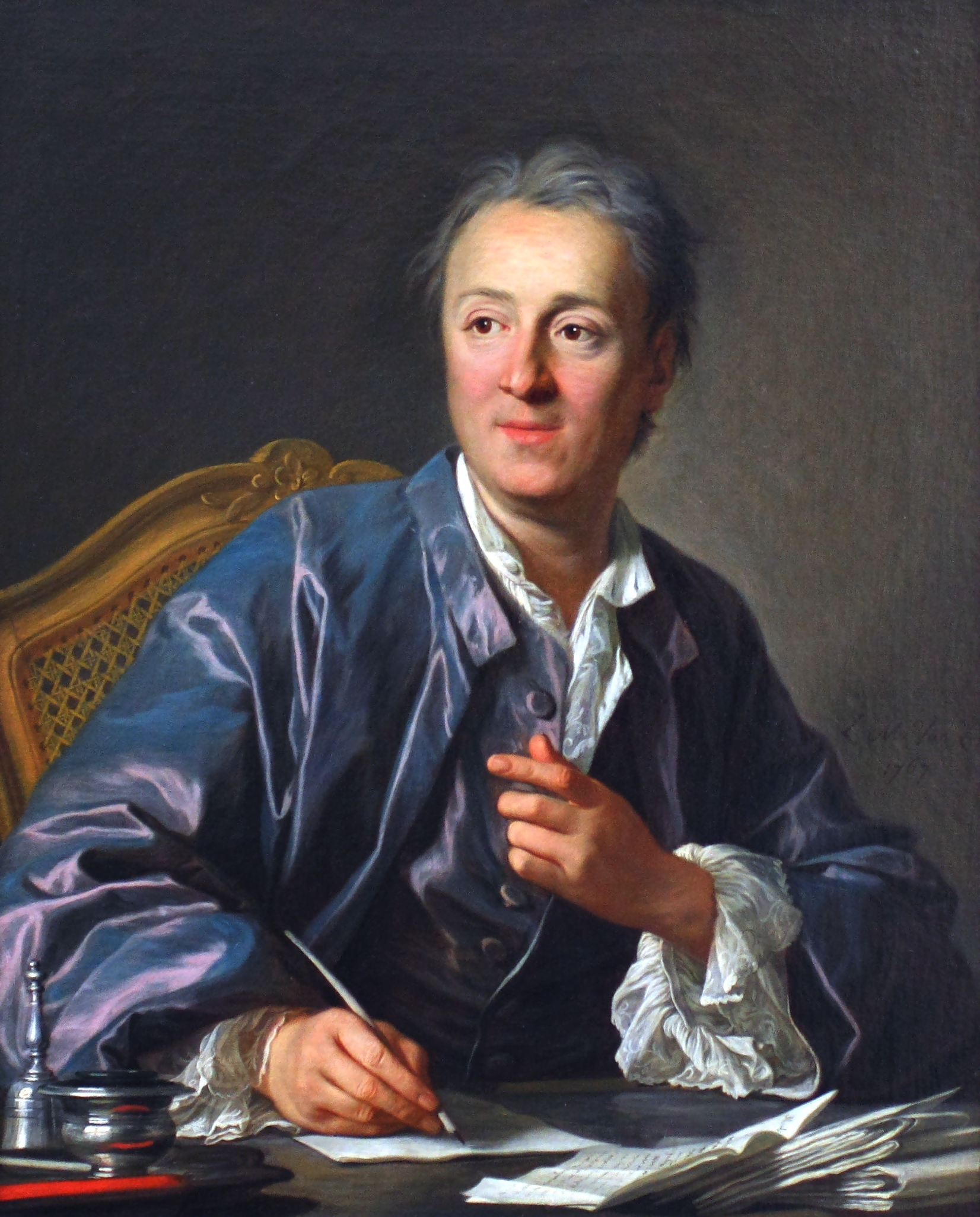
Denis Diderot

As an encyclopaedist, Denis Diderot believed in the progress of humankind through the expansion of free and accessible education. He publicly advocated for enlightened absolutism through the formation of a social contract between a monarch and their subjects, which would ensure the passage of utilitarian policy that would reflect the general will of the people. In his novel Jacques the Fatalist, Diderot argued for a form of determinism while also criticising the abdication of moral responsibility. In his dialogue Rameau's Nephew, he reveled in hedonism while still holding strongly to virtue ethics, encouraging natural legislation that would "encourage and apply the [passions of men] to both public and private interest." But in private, Diderot's thought was far more radical, believing that "nature gave no man the right to rule over others". At parties, he openly expressed a love of individual freedom and declared that "nature has made neither servant nor master; I neither want to give nor receive laws!" Diderot also believed in replacing man-made laws with natural ones, in one of his works depicting children rebelling against their strict father, one of them justifying themselves by saying "there are no laws at all for the wise". In his Supplement to the Voyage of Bougainville, Diderot depicted Tahiti as utopian stateless society, one characterised by common ownership, free love and leisure. Following a "rational code of conduct", Diderot's Tahitians argued for the maximization of liberty and utility through an appeal to nature. Diderot directly criticised the Western civilization that had been imposed on Tahiti by French colonization, responding with a call for the abolition of both civic and religious institutions, claiming that "to order things is always to make oneself master of others by disturbing them".

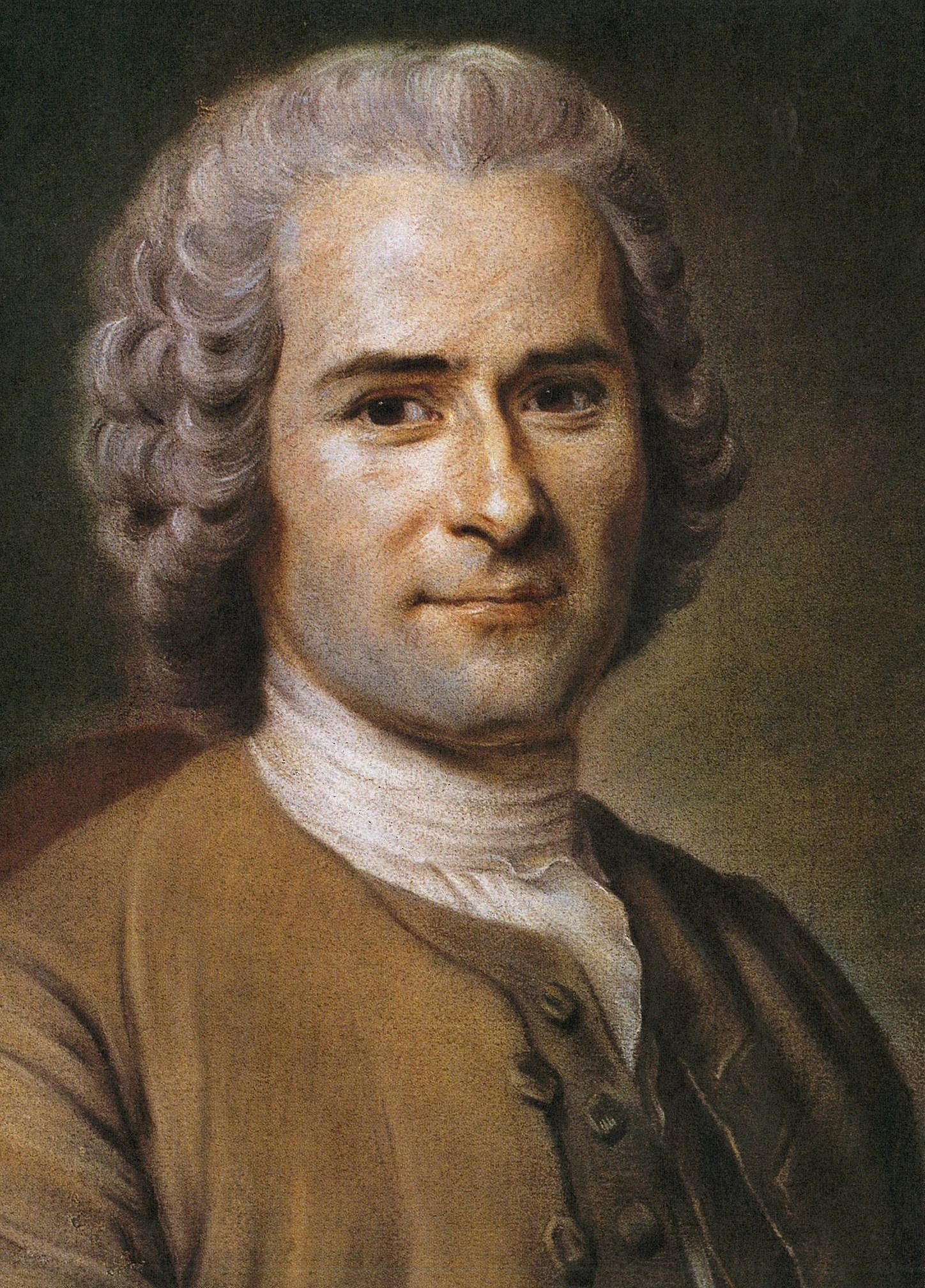
Jean-Jacques Rousseau

The early work of Jean-Jacques Rousseau was noted for its libertarianism, summed up in his famous line: "man is born free; and everywhere he is in chains." In his Discourse on Inequality, he developed on the idea of the inherent goodness of human nature and its corruption by existing institutions, analyzing that it was the emergence of private property that had been the main cause of the development of social inequality. He argued that after the foundation of private property, government was established to enforce them and began a process of developing towards autocracy. Although Rousseau's analysis of the rise of inequality had inspired anarchists such as William Godwin, who declared that "government, however formed, was little capable of affording solid benefit to mankind", Rousseau himself did not call for the abolition of government. His call for a liberatory form of education in Emile also inspired later anarchists, despite his authoritarian view of the teacher. It was Rousseau's publication of The Social Contract that marked the beginning of his turn from libertarian to authoritarian tendencies, particularly with his theory of a "general will" of the people. Rousseau's conception of the state was totalitarian, proposing a corporate state where the individual was completely subordinate to society, where a dictatorial elite would work to interpret "general will" and implement it, executing anyone that dissented. Rousseau's shift from a lover of individual liberty to an apologist for totalitarian democracy was noted by anarchists, with Mikhail Bakunin decrying him as "the true creator of modem reaction. To all appearance the most democratic writer of the eighteenth century, he bred within himself the pitiless despotism of the statesman. He was the prophet of the doctrinaire State, as Robespierre, his worthy and faithful disciple, tried to become its high priest." Despite this, the historian Peter Marshall said that the earlier work of Rousseau "deserves a prominent place in the anarchist tradition", due to his historical analysis of social inequality, his praise for the state of nature and the natural goodness of humanity, and his defense of egalitarianism and popular democracy.

The end of the Enlightenment with the outbreak of the Atlantic Revolutions brought about the first clear expression of anarchist ideas, with the work of William Godwin. In his Enquiry Concerning Political Justice, Godwin argued against the legitimacy of government and called for the expansion of education, under the belief that individual reason alone was sufficient to replace the law and establish a system of decentralized direct democracy in place of the state: "there will be no war, no crimes, no administration of justice, as it is called, and no government." In order for this rationalism to flourish, Godwin called for the maximization of individual liberty and social equality. He believed that to achieve a rational society it would be necessary to eliminate poverty, chiefly through the distribution of property equally among all people. Peter Kropotkin would later claim Godwin to be a forerunner of anarcho-communism.

== Late modern era ==
=== French Revolution ===
The Storming of the Bastille inspired generations of anarchists

The French Revolution has been a landmark in the history of anarchism. The use of revolutionary violence by masses to achieve political ends has been in the imaginary of anarchists of the forthcoming centuries and events as Women's March on Versailles, the Storming of the Bastille or the Réveillon riots were seen as the revolutionary archetype. In his "Manifesto of the Equals", Sylvain Maréchal looked forward to the disappearance, once and for all, of "the revolting distinction between rich and poor, of great and small, of masters and valets, of governors and governed". Anarchists would identify themselves with the enrages or sans-culottes. The Enragés (Enraged Ones) opposed revolutionary government as a contradiction in terms. Denouncing the Jacobin dictatorship, Jean Varlet wrote in 1794 that "government and revolution are incompatible, unless the people wish to set its constituted authorities in permanent insurrection against itself". French Revolution depicted in the common subconscious of anarchists that as soon as the rebels seize power, they would become the new tyrants, something that was evident by the State orchestrated violence of the Reign of Terror. The proto-anarchist groups of enrages and sans-culottes were ultimately erased at the edge of the guillotine.

The debate of the effects of the French Revolution to the anarchist causes spans to our days. For anarchist historian Max Nettlau, French revolutions did nothing more than re-shaping and modernizing the militaristic state, while Kropotkin traced the origins of the anarchist movement in the struggle of the revolutionaries. In a more moderate approach, Sean Sheehan points out that the French Revolution proved that even the strongest political establishments can be overthrown.

== Bibliography ==
- Armand, Émile (1933). Les précurseurs de l'anarchisme [The Precursors of Anarchism] (PDF) (in French). Paris: Éditions de l'En dehors. OCLC 608380044. English translation
- Barclay, Harold B. (1990). People without government: an anthropology of anarchy. Kahn & Averill. ISBN 978-1-871082-16-6.
- Crone, Patricia (1991). "Kavad's Heresy and Mazdak's Revolt" (PDF). Iran: Journal of the British Institute of Persian Studies. 29: 21–40. Archived from the original (PDF) on November 2, 2019.
- Crone, Patricia (2000). "Ninth-Century Muslim Anarchists" (PDF). Past & Present (167): 3–28. doi:10.1093/past/167.1.3. Archived from the original (PDF) on August 28, 2020.
- D'Agostino, Anthony (2019). "Anarchism and Marxism in the Russian Revolution". In Levy, Carl; Adams, Matthew S. (eds.). The Palgrave Handbook of Anarchism. Springer. ISBN 978-3-319-75620-2.
- de Acosta, Alejandro (2009). "Two undecidable questions for thinking in which anything goes". In Randall Amster (ed.). Contemporary Anarchist Studies: An Introductory Anthology of Anarchy in the Academy. Luis Fernandez, Abraham DeLeon. Routledge. ISBN 978-0-415-47402-3.
- Fiala, Andrew (October 3, 2017). "Anarchism". Stanford Encyclopedia of Philosophy.
- Foster, William E. (1886). Town government in Rhode Island. Baltimore: Johns Hopkins Press.
- Goodway, David (2006). Anarchist Seeds Beneath the Snow: Left-libertarian Thought and British Writers from William Morris to Colin Ward. PM Press. ISBN 978-1-60486-221-8.
- Graham, Robert (2005). "Preface". Anarchism: a Documentary History of Libertarian Ideas: from Anarchy to Anarchism. Montréal: Black Rose Books. ISBN 978-1-55164-250-5.
- Joll, James (1975). The anarchists. Επίκουρος(Greek edition). ISBN 9780674036413.
- Jun, Nathan J.; Wahl, Shane (2010). New Perspectives on Anarchism. Rowman & Littlefield. ISBN 978-0-7391-3241-8.
- Lehning, Arthur (2003). "Anarchism". Dictionary of the History of Ideas. Archived from the original on September 9, 2006.
- Long, Roderick T. (2013). Gerald F. Gaus; Fred D'Agostino (eds.). The Routledge Companion to Social and Political Philosophy. Routledge. ISBN 978-0-415-87456-4.
- Marshall, Peter H. (2008) [1992]. "Part Two: Forerunners of Anarchism". Demanding the Impossible: A History of Anarchism. London: Harper Perennial. pp. 51–139. ISBN 978-0-00-686245-1. OCLC 218212571.
- McKinley, C. Alexander (2019). "The French Revolution and 1848". In Levy, Carl; Adams, Matthew S. (eds.). The Palgrave Handbook of Anarchism. Cham: Springer Publishing. pp. 307–324. doi:10.1007/978-3-319-75620-2_18. ISBN 978-3-319-75620-2. OCLC 7704845112. S2CID 158876153.
- McLaughlin, Paul (2007). "The Historical Foundations of Anarchism". Anarchism and Authority: A Philosophical Introduction to Classical Anarchism. Burlington: Ashgate Publishing. pp. 101–116. ISBN 978-0-7546-6196-2. OCLC 85766067.
- Nettlau, Max (1996). A Short History of Anarchism. Freedom Press. ISBN 978-0-900384-89-9.
- Rapp, John A. (August 9, 2012). Daoism and Anarchism: Critiques of State Autonomy in Ancient and Modern China. A&C Black. ISBN 978-1-4411-3223-9.
- Ross, Carne (2019). "Preface". In Levy, Carl; Adams, Matthew S. (eds.). The Palgrave Handbook of Anarchism. Springer. ISBN 978-3-319-75620-2.
- Schofield, Malcolm (July 1999). The Stoic Idea of the City. University of Chicago Press. ISBN 978-0-226-74006-5.
- Sheehan, Seán (2003). Anarchism. Reaktion Books. ISBN 978-1-86189-169-3.
- Woodcock, G. (1962). Anarchism: A History of Libertarian Ideas and Movements. Melbourne: Penguin.
