= Chris Pallis =

Anglo-Greek neurologist and socialist

Christopher Agamemnon Pallis (2 December 1923 – 10 March 2005) was an Anglo-Greek neurologist and libertarian socialist intellectual. Under the pen names Martin Grainger and Maurice Brinton, he wrote and translated for the British group Solidarity from 1960 until the early 1980s. As a neurologist, he produced the accepted criteria for brainstem death, and wrote the entry on death for Encyclopædia Britannica.

== Life ==
Chris Pallis was born in Bombay, British Raj, to a prominent Anglo-Greek family, "of whose intellectual achievements he was always extremely proud". The poet Alexandros Pallis was a great-uncle, and so the writers Marietta Pallis and Marco Pallis were also relatives. His father Alex was general manager of the family firm of merchant bankers, Ralli Brothers; when he retired, he returned from India to settle in Switzerland. Educated there, Chris Pallis became fluent in French, English and Greek.

In 1940, the family managed to take the last boat out of France, and settled in England. Pallis went on to study medicine at Balliol College, Oxford in 1941. He joined the Communist Party of Great Britain, but he was quickly expelled for criticising its policy on the Second World War, and became a member of the Trotskyist Revolutionary Communist Party.

For the next 20 years he combined a distinguished medical career under his real name with pseudonymous revolutionary socialist writing and translation. After he was outed for his use of the name Martin Grainger in such left-wing journals as the New Statesman he changed his pseudonym. Subsequently his boss, Christopher Booth, defended him from further press criticism, saying that he was a fine neurologist entitled to his own political views.

Pallis's published works include several eyewitness accounts of key moments in European left politics, such as the Belgian general strike of 1960–1961, the May 1968 events in France, and Portugal's Carnation Revolution in 1974–75; a substantial body of English translations of works by Cornelius Castoriadis, the main thinker of the French group Socialisme ou Barbarie; and two short books of his own: The Bolsheviks and Workers' Control (1970) and The Irrational in Politics (1974), which is largely concerned with sexual politics.
