= Bao Jingyan =

Chinese libertarian/anarchist philosopher and Taoist

Bào Jìngyán
- 鮑敬言
- Citizenship: Jin Empire
- Occupations: Philosopher, Taoist
- Known for: Taoism, proto-anarchism
- Notable work: Neither Lord Nor Subject

Bao Jingyan or Pao Ching-yen (Chinese: 鮑敬言; pinyin: Bào Jìngyán) was a Chinese libertarian/anarchist philosopher and Taoist who lived somewhere between the late 200's AD and before 400 AD.

== Dating ==
Hong Kong sinologist Xiogan Liu placed Bao Jingyan before 363 AD, but considered it an open question, and was not a dedicated study of his dating.

== Political thought ==
John Rapp has speculated that Bao Jingyan was probably a part of the aristocratic class. A successor of Laozi and Zhuang Zhou strain of libertarian Taoism, Pao Ching-yen was, according to Etienne Balazs, "China's first political anarchist." Xiaogan Liu considered the philosophy as primarily developing out of "anarchist" strains in the Zhuangzi.

Bao Jingyan was the author of the treatise "Neither Lord Nor Subject" (無君論 or 無君無臣). It is preserved in the Waipian (part of the Baopuzi) of the Taoist Ge Hong, though the latter works to refute Bao's essay. Bao was the first in China to place utopia in the field of politics. Influenced by Zhuangzi's thought, he opposed despotic absolutism. Drawing on Chapter 9 of the Zhuangzi, Bao Jingyan argued against the idea of a natural order of where one group ruled over another, instead saying that government exercises force to the benefit of the ruling class.

Bao Jingyan framed the origin of the state as an institution which was created and maintained by an oppressive dominant class. In one text, he wrote:

The Confucian literati say: 'Heaven gave birth to the people and then set rulers over them.' But how can High Heaven have said this in so many words? Is it not rather that interested parties made this their pretext? The fact is that the strong oppressed the weak and the weak submitted to them; the cunning tricked the innocent and the innocent served them.It was because there was submission that the relation of lord and subject arose, and because there was servitude that the people, being powerless, could be kept under control. Thus servitude and mastery result from the struggle between the cunning and innocent, and Blue Heaven has nothing whatsoever to do with it.

Given the obscurity of Bao Jingyan's person, Jean Levi hypothesized that he could have been the pen name of Ge Hong, who would thus pass subversive theses without taking too many risks, or at the very least that Ge felt a certain sympathy towards these theses. But this claim does not fit well with his Confucian-legalist political philosophy and criticisms of the disorderly political consequences of Lao-Zhuang political discourse.

Bao Jingyan's thought concerning the idea that crime has its origin in government, particuarly the way governments enact punishments and harsh laws, has been compared to the later ideas of the 19th century Russian anarchist Mikhail Bakunin.

== See also ==
- No gods, no masters, a similar anarchist slogan

== Bibliography ==
- Balazs, Etienne (1967). Chinese Civilization and Bureaucracy: Variations on a Theme. Yale University Press. ISBN 978-0-300-09456-5.
- Balazs, Étienne (1968). La Bureaucratie céleste: Recherches sur l'économie et la société de la Chine traditionnelle. Bibliothèque des sciences humaines (in French). Paris: Gallimard. OCLC 462847510.
- Graham, Robert (2005). "1. Bao Jingyan: Neither Lord Nor Subject (300 CE)". Anarchism. A Documentary History of Libertarian Ideas. Vol. One: From Anarchy to Anarchism (300CE to 1939). Montreal: Black Rose Books. ISBN 1-55164-250-6.
- Knapp, Keith (n.d.). "Ge Hong". Internet Encyclopedia of Philosophy.
- Levi, Jean (2004). Éloge de l'anarchie par deux excentriques chinois (in French). Paris: Éditions de l'encyclopédie des nuisances. p. 92. ISBN 2-910386-23-6. Éloge.
- Needham, Joseph (1991) [1956]. Science and Civilisation in China: Volume 2, History of Scientific Thought (Corrected reprint ed.). Cambridge University Press. ISBN 978-0-521-05800-1.
- Rapp, John A. (2012). Daoism and Anarchism: Critiques of State Autonomy in Ancient and Modern China. A&C Black. ISBN 978-1-4411-3223-9.
