= John Rupp =

John Rupp may refer to:

- John Rupp, a guard who played for the Buffalo All-Americans during the inaugural season of the National Football League; see List of players who appeared in only one game in the NFL (1920–1929) § 1920
- John Rupp, director off The Way International

== See also ==
- John Rapp
