= The Southern Land, Known =

1676 novel by Gabriel de Foigny

The Southern Land, Known (French: Les aventures de Jacques Sadeur dans la découverte et le voyage de la terre Australe) is a French adventure novel authored by Gabriel de Foigny in 1676. The story is about the protagonist Jacques Sadeur, from his birth to the departures from the hypothetical southern continent of Terra Australis. In this book, Foigny utilizes utopian fiction to describe an egalitarian society without government and people without the need of religion.

== Context ==
The novel depicts a Utopia with freedom-loving people without government and no need of religion With the spread of the Renaissance across Europe, anti-authoritarian and secular ideas re-emerged, in response to the growing centralization of power by absolute monarchies. These ideas were precursors to anarchism.

== Bibliography ==
- Marshall, Peter H. (2008) [1992]. "Part Two: Forerunners of Anarchism". Demanding the Impossible: A History of Anarchism. London: Harper Perennial. pp. 51–139. ISBN 978-0-00-686245-1. OCLC 218212571.
