= Solidarity (UK) =

- Spokesperson: Chris Pallis
- Founded: 1960
- Dissolved: 1992
- Split from: Socialist Labour League
- Succeeded by: World Revolution; Communist Workers' Organisation
- Newspaper: Solidarity
- Ideology: Libertarian socialism Council communism
- Political position: Far-left
- French sister organisation: Socialisme ou Barbarie

Solidarity was a small libertarian socialist organisation from 1960 to 1992 in the United Kingdom. It published a magazine of the same name. Solidarity was close to council communism in its prescriptions and was known for its emphasis on workers' self-organisation and for its radical anti-Leninism.

== History ==
Solidarity was founded in 1960 by a small group of expelled members of the Trotskyist Socialist Labour League. It was initially known as Socialism Reaffirmed. The group published a journal, Agitator, which after six issues was renamed Solidarity, from which the organisation took its new name. Almost from the start it was strongly influenced by the French Socialisme ou Barbarie group, in particular by its intellectual leader Cornelius Castoriadis, whose essays were among the many pamphlets Solidarity produced.

In 1961, it occupied the Russian embassy in London to protest the USSR's nuclear programme.

The group was never large, but its magazine and pamphlets were widely read, and group members played a major part in several crucial industrial disputes and many radical campaigns, from the Committee of 100 in the early-1960s peace movement to the Polish Solidarity Campaign of the early 1980s. In the mid-1970s, a number of Solidarity's members left to form the left communist group, the Communist Workers' Organisation.

Solidarity existed as a nationwide organisation with groups in London and many other cities until 1981, when it imploded after a series of political disputes. Solidarity the magazine continued to be published by the London group until 1992; other former Solidarity members were behind Wildcat in Manchester and Here and Now magazine in Glasgow.

The intellectual leader of the group was Chris Pallis, whose pamphlets (written under the name Maurice Brinton) included Paris May 1968, The Bolsheviks and Workers' Control 1917-21 and The Irrational in Politics. Other key Solidarity writers were Andy Anderson (author of Hungary 1956), Ken Weller (who wrote several pamphlets on industrial struggles and oversaw the group's Motor Bulletins on the car industry), Joe Jacobs (Out of the Ghetto), John Quail (The Slow-Burning Fuse), Phil Mailer (Portugal: The Impossible Revolution) John King (The Political Economy of Marx, A History of Marxian Economics), George Williamson (writing as James Finlayson, Urban Devastation – The Planning of Incarceration), David Lamb (Mutinies) and Liz Willis (Women in the Spanish Revolution).

== Ideology ==
Membership of Solidarity was open to anyone who agreed with the statement As We See It, later elaborated in As We Don't See It, some key points of which were:

During the past century the living standards of working people have improved. But neither these improved living standards, nor the nationalisation of the means of production, nor the coming to power of parties claiming to represent the working class have basically altered the status of the worker as worker....

Nor have they given the bulk of mankind much freedom outside of production. East and west, capitalism remains an inhuman type of society where the vast majority are bossed at work and manipulated in consumption and leisure. Propaganda and policemen, prisons and schools, traditional values and traditional morality all serve to reinforce the power of the few and to convince or coerce the many into acceptance of a brutal, degrading and irrational system. The ‘communist’ world is not communist and the ‘free’ world is not free....

A socialist society can therefore only be built from below. Decisions concerning production and work will be taken by workers' councils composed of elected and revocable delegates. Decisions in other areas will be taken on the basis of the widest possible discussion and consultation among the people as a whole. This democratisation of society down to its very roots is what we mean by ‘workers power'.

Solidarity rejected what it saw as the economic determinism and elitism of most of the Marxist left and committed itself to a view of socialism based on self-management. Supporting those who were in conflict with bureaucratic capitalist society "in industry and elsewhere", the group tried to generalise their experiences to develop a mass revolutionary consciousness, which it believed was essential for a total transformation of society. Crucially, the group did not see itself as another political leadership. On the contrary, it believed that the workers themselves should decide on the objectives of their struggles. Control and organisation should remain firmly in their own hands.

In accordance with this, Solidarity had no confidence in the traditional organisations of the working class, the political parties and the trade unions, which it said had become parts of the bureaucratic capitalist pattern of exploitation. The group stressed that socialism was not just the common ownership and control of the means of production and distribution: it also meant equality, real freedom, reciprocal recognition and a radical transformation in all human relations.

Solidarity argued that what it called the "trad revs", i.e., 'traditional revolutionaries' -- among whom it included social democrats, trade unionists, Communists and Trotskyists—had failed to understand that in modern capitalist societies (in which it included Soviet-type societies) the key class division was between order-givers and order-takers and that self-management was now the only viable socialism.

== Practice ==
In workplace politics, Solidarity took a strong line in defence of shop stewards against trade union bureaucrats (and subsequently argued that too many shop stewards had been co-opted by official trade unionism). The group did not put forward candidates for election to union posts (though many Solidarity members became shop stewards and some became officials). It nevertheless played a significant role in several industrial disputes in the 1960s and 1970s by offering its services to those involved.

But it was always also otherwise engaged. The group played an important part in the direct action wing of the early-1960s peace movement (including the Committee of 100 and Spies for Peace), in local and national agitation on housing policy and in squatting throughout the 1960s and 1970s, in protests and actions against the Greek colonels and other right-wing dictatorships in the same period, in the anti-Vietnam war movement, in support of dissidents in the Soviet Union, eastern Europe and China, and in the feminist movement. In later years, Solidarity members tended to get involved in whatever took their fancy, though there were several concerted interventions, the last of them to help set up the Polish Solidarity Campaign in the early 1980s.

The group's distinctive features in its interventions were its rejection of the leftist fashions both for "respectability" – the bugbear of first-wave CND as it saw it – and for supporting "national liberation struggles" in the third world and, closer to home, Ireland. Solidarity was also anti-Zionist (in Brinton's 1974 essay "The Malaise on the Left" Zionism is described as "anti-Arab" and "anti-socialist"). Solidarity was corruscating in its criticisms of Leninist organisational practice, of the "lifestyle" left that saw "liberation" in personal terms, and of fellow libertarian socialists who fetishised action for its own sake.

Solidarity consistently privileged first-person participant accounts of activism in its industrial and campaigning politics and was equally consistently critical of the process of grassroots political activity. Time and again the group produced documented case studies of how left orthodoxy had let down workers in struggle or radical campaigns. Critics accused it of sectarianism and argued that it operated – contrary to its professed anti-elitism – as an informal "structureless tyranny" with Pallis/Brinton at the centre of a clique of friends. David Widgery's 1973 survey noted:

"Mascot is a hedgehog: small, prickly and doesn't like being interfered with."

— David Widgery,

== Publications ==
For all Solidarity's engagement in struggle "in industry and elsewhere", its main activity was as a publications group. It produced regular magazines from 1960 to 1992. Agitator (1960–61), which became Solidarity for Workers' Power (1961–1977), was published by the London Solidarity group; there were also various short-lived Solidarity magazines published outside London, including the north-west and Glasgow. Solidarity for Self-Management (1977–78) and Solidarity for Social Revolution (1978–81) were both magazines of the national group. The final manifestation of the magazine, called simply Solidarity (1982–92), was published by the London group.

The group also specialised in pamphlets, of which it produced more than 60. Many of them were texts by Cornelius Castoriadis from Socialisme ou Barbarie, published under Castoriadis's pen-name, Paul Cardan, among them Modern Capitalism and Revolution, From Bolshevism to the Bureaucracy, Redefining Revolution, The Meaning of Socialism and Workers' Councils and the Economics of a Self-Managed Society. Other pamphlets include: Solidarity's platforms, As We See It and As We Don't See It; Maurice Brinton's The Bolsheviks and Workers' Control 1917-21, Paris, May 1968 and The Irrational in Politics; and Andy Anderson's Hungary 1956. Solidarity also reprinted many pamphlets associated with the Workers' Opposition in Russia, such as Ida Mett's The Kronstadt Commune and Alexandra Kollontai's The Workers' Opposition. Many of the pamphlets are accessible online.

== Bibliography ==
Former members of Solidarity are contributing accounts of their experiences with the group to John Quail, who is writing a history. Louis Robertson (the pen-name of a Solidarity member of the late 1970s from the Midlands, who joined the group with a handful of other fellow former dissident members of the Socialist Party of Great Britain) has published an account on the web of his time in Solidarity. He says:

Solidarity was heavily influenced by Socialisme ou Barbarie among other things. Actually, looking back, the influences were probably more eclectic.... Solidarity published many pamphlets, they fell into a number of categories which probably reflect the different influences on and within the group.

One effort was to republish the works of Castoriadis into English.... It was from this trend that Solidarity's ideas of society being divided into order givers and order takers came, rather than a working and a capitalist class. This was not a view held by everyone and anyway many simply seemed to see the ideas of order givers and order takers as being another way of talking about the working and a capitalist class. Others took it far more seriously and I think that these ideas still linger on in the anarchist movement in the politics of Class War and Andy Anderson et al.:...

A second strand was rediscovering important moments of revolutionary working-class history. This saw many excellent pamphlets, including Brinton's The Bolsheviks and Workers' Control. Without Solidarity's efforts we would all be much less knowledgeable in Britain.

A third effort was in publishing industrial accounts which gave voice to what workers were doing during important periods of struggle, particularly in the late sixties. In the late seventies we tried to continue this in the magazine with a couple of special motor supplements. We were able to do this because some of the original members had an industrial background.

Robertson also describes the group as he first encountered it in the early 1970s:

At that time (1972) Solidarity had autonomous groups in a number of British cities and was bringing out more than one paper.... It was a time of mass industrial struggle and each issue carried fascinating commentaries and analysis of what was going on, combined with what workers were saying.

He continues on the mid-1970s:

Membership fluctuated around the 80 to 100 mark. There were groups in London, Aberdeen, Manchester, Glasgow, Leeds, Liverpool, Oxford and probably some other places too. We held conferences every quarter and brought out the magazine Solidarity for Social Revolution at the same interval. Whilst we were never a membership organisation as such, people still had to be known by others and be accepted into membership which depended on agreement with As We See It.

In fact there were two London groups: the original North London group and a West London group that focused on industrial agitation in West London.

Robertson goes on to describe how Solidarity played midwife to various minor left-wing groups, among them the left-communist groups World Revolution and the Communist Workers' Organisation. He concludes:

In my opinion, Solidarity was one of the most important organisations in post-war Britain. Apart from the syndicalists, every group in Britain today owes something to their ideas."
