= Discourse on Voluntary Servitude =

1577 essay

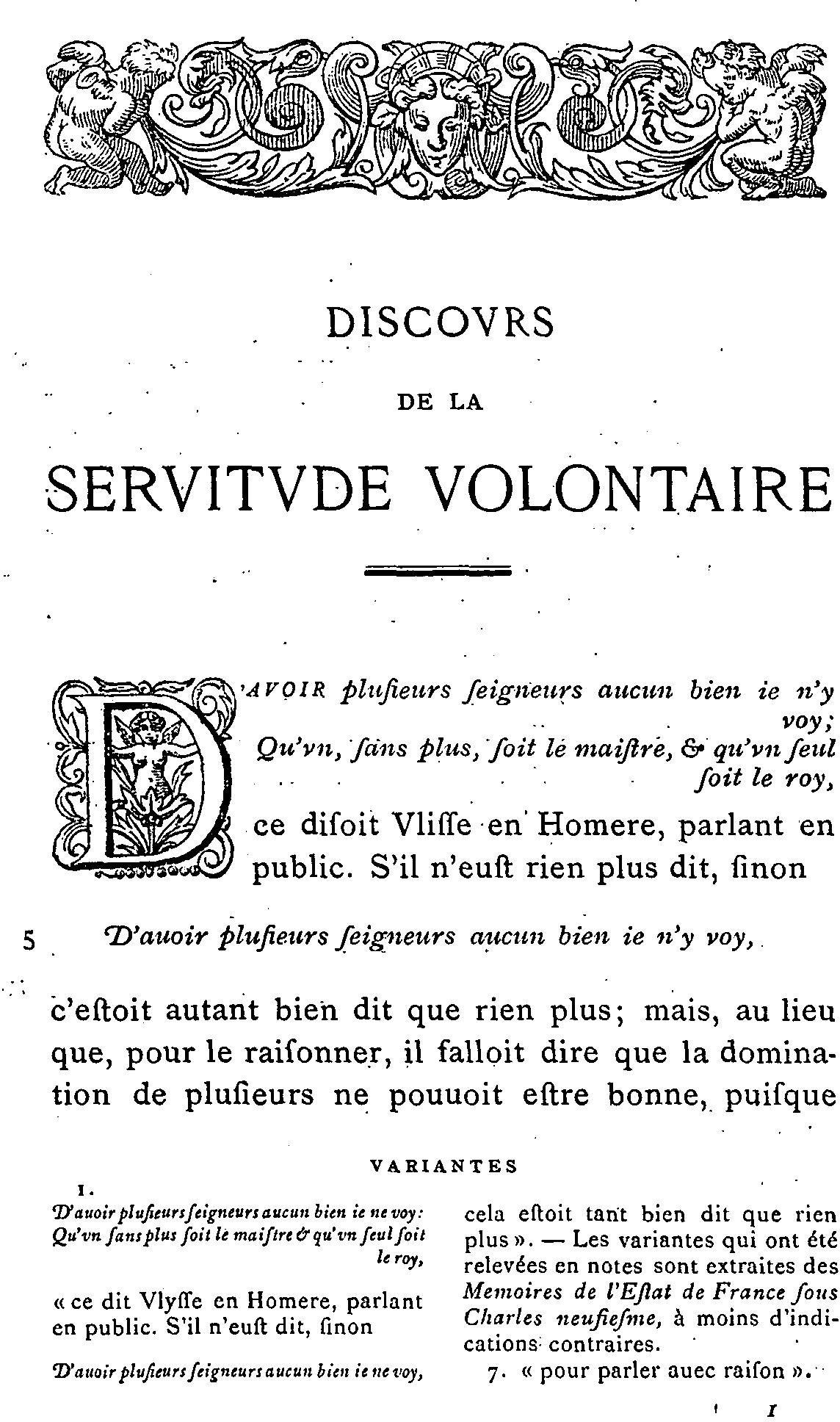
- Author: Étienne de La Boétie
- Original title: Discours de la servitude volontaire
- Language: Middle French
- Genre: Essay
- Publication date: 1577
- Publication place: Kingdom of France

The Discourse on Voluntary Servitude (French: Discours de la servitude volontaire), also known in French as "le Contr'Un" [against (the power of) one, i.e. tyranny], is an essay by Étienne de La Boétie. The text was published posthumously and clandestinely in 1577. The essay, although rather short, has had a lasting influence on political thought.

== Composition ==
As it remained unpublished long after its composition, the date of preparation of the Discourse on Voluntary Servitude is uncertain. According to La Boétie's closest friend, Michel de Montaigne, it was written when La Boétie was 16–18 years old. Recent studies suggest that La Boétie wrote the Discourse between 1552 and 1553, while he was about 22 years old and was studying at university. After La Boétie's death in 1563, Montaigne came into possession of the manuscript, but he refused to publish it.

== Content ==
The Discourse on Voluntary Servitude poses the question of why people submit to authority. La Boétie believed that government was unnecessary, and that the only requirement for it to be abolished was that the people who allowed themselves to be ruled engage in civil disobedience. He asserted that, while liberty was an inherent part of human nature, slavery was not a natural law but was enforced solely through habit. La Boétie proposed that if people lived only by their natural rights, they would be obedient to their own parents and follow their own reason but would not allow themselves to be subordinate to anybody else.

As government still existed, La Boétie concluded that people did not truly desire liberty and instead had voluntarily accepted their own servitude. He then clarified that, as this servitude was voluntary rather than accepted through a social contract, they could also disobey their rulers and remove them whenever they considered it necessary. La Boétie's view was an early articulation of popular sovereignty, in which political power emanated from the people.

La Boétie celebrated liberty as an inherent good and said that, when it was lost, it gave way to evil and any good that remained was "corrupted by servitude". He also condemned tyrants, which he categorised into three types: those elected by the people; those who took power by force; and those who were brought to power by order of succession. Although he held that elected tyrants were the most justifiable, he nevertheless believed that all three types of tyranny were problematic, as they all involved people giving up their freedoms for servitude.

La Boétie posited that people continued to voluntarily accept servitude because they were born and brought up in servitude. He said that, in most cases, tyranny was maintained by the self-interest of people that sought to profit from their own domination, rather than it being maintained through force. To reverse this process, he called for people to engage in civil disobedience and take back the power they had given to their rulers.

== Legacy ==
In 1576, the Discourse entered circulation among exiled Huguenots in the County of Holland. It was largely forgotten until the Age of Enlightenment, when it was read by Jean-Jacques Rousseau. During the French Revolution, the Discourse was recognised as a classic of political theory and republished for the first time in two centuries. Centuries after its publication, the Discourse on Voluntary Servitude has been widely recognised by various contemporary political traditions. Its advocacy of civil disobedience gave it a place among pacifists, with Ralph Waldo Emerson dedicating a poem to La Boétie, and Leo Tolstoy translating it into the Russian language. Anarchists – including Gustav Landauer, Bart de Ligt, Max Nettlau, Rudolf Rocker, and Nicolas Walter – considered it to be a notable precursor to anarchism, due to its depiction of a stateless society. Its emphasis on personal development and initiative also inspired right-wing libertarians such as Murray Rothbard.

== Publication history ==
French original

- Œuvres complètes, Editions William Blake & Co., 1991. ISBN 2-905810-60-2
- Discours de la servitude volontaire, Editions Flammarion, 1993. ISBN 2-08-070394-3
- Discours de la servitude volontaire, Editions Mille et une nuits, 1997. ISBN 2-910233-94-4

English translation

- The Politics of Obedience: The Discourse of Voluntary Servitude, translated by Harry Kurz and with an introduction by Murray Rothbard, Free Life Editions, 1975. ISBN 0-914156-11-X
- The Politics of Obedience: The Discourse of Voluntary Servitude, translated by Harry Kurz and with an introduction by Murray Rothbard, Montrèal/New York/London: Black Rose Books, 1997. ISBN 1-55164-089-9

== See also ==
- The Prince

== Bibliography ==
- Abensour, Miguel (2011). "Is there a proper way to use the voluntary servitude hypothesis?". Journal of Political Ideologies. 16 (3): 329–348. doi:10.1080/13569317.2011.607299. ISSN 1356-9317.
- Keohane, Nannerl O. (1977). "The Radical Humanism of Étienne de la Boétie". Journal of the History of Ideas. 38 (1): 119–130. doi:10.2307/2708844. JSTOR 2708844. LCCN 0022-5037.
- Marshall, Peter H. (2008) [1992]. "The French Renaissance and Enlightenment". Demanding the Impossible: A History of Anarchism. London: Harper Perennial. pp. 108–128. ISBN 978-0-00-686245-1. OCLC 218212571.
- Mazzocchi, Paul (2018). "Desire, Friendship, and the Politics of Refusal: The Utopian Afterlives of La Boétie's Discourse on Voluntary Servitude". Utopian Studies. 29 (2): 248–266. doi:10.5325/utopianstudies.29.2.0248. ISSN 1045-991X.
- Newman, Paul (2022a). "La Boétie and republican liberty: Voluntary servitude and non-domination". European Journal of Political Theory. 21 (1): 134–154. doi:10.1177/1474885119863141. ISSN 1474-8851.
- Newman, Paul (2022b). "Power, Freedom and Obedience in Foucault and La Boétie: Voluntary Servitude as the Problem of Government". Theory, Culture & Society. 39 (1): 123–141. doi:10.1177/02632764211024333. ISSN 0263-2764.
- Presley, Sharon (2008). "La Boétie, Étienne de (1530–1563)". In Hamowy, Ronald (ed.). The Encyclopedia of Libertarianism. Thousand Oaks, CA: SAGE; Cato Institute. p. 277. doi:10.4135/9781412965811.n165. ISBN 978-1-4129-6580-4. LCCN 2008009151. OCLC 750831024.
- Romele, Alberto; Gallino, Francesco; Emmenegger, Camilla; Gorgone, Daniele (2017). "Panopticism is not Enough: Social Media as Technologies of Voluntary Servitude". Surveillance & Society. 15 (2): 204–221. doi:10.24908/ss.v15i2.6021. ISSN 1477-7487.
- Rothbard, Murray (1975). "The Political Thought of Étienne de La Boétie". The Politics of Obedience: "The Discourse of Voluntary Servitude". Free Life Editions. pp. 9–42. ISBN 0-914156-10-1. LCCN 75-10120. OCLC 1974998.
