= Anarchist Studies =

Academic journal on anarchism

- Cover of Volume 15, no. 2, 2007
- Discipline: Political science
- Language: English
- Edited by: Ruth Kinna

Publication details
- History: 1993–present
- Publisher: Lawrence and Wishart (United Kingdom)
- Frequency: Biannually
- License: CC BY-NC-ND

Standard abbreviations
- ISO 4: Anarch. Stud.

Indexing
- ISSN: 0967-3393
- OCLC no.: 163567083

Links
- Journal homepage

Anarchist Studies is a biannual academic journal on anarchism. It takes an interdisciplinary approach, examining the history, culture, and theory of anarchism. The journal was established in 1993 and is edited by Ruth Kinna and published by Lawrence and Wishart.

== Overview ==
The journal focusses on three broad themes: the re-evaluation of anarchist history, with regard to issues of culture, philosophy, and political action; the potential future of anarchism as a form of critical political action; and the application of anarchist ideas as an instrument of scholarly research. The journal publishes special issues on topics which have included sexuality, science-fiction, and "anarchism after September 11," as well as historical research on Leo Tolstoy, Taoism, John Locke, and post-structuralism. More recently, a central focus of the journal has been anarchism's relation to globalisation.
