= Étienne Balazs =

French sinologist (1905–1963)

- Born: Balázs István; 24 January 1905; Budapest, Austria-Hungary
- Died: 29 November 1963 (aged 58); Paris, France

Academic background
- Education: University of Berlin

Academic work
- Discipline: Chinese history
- Institutions: University of Paris; École pratique des hautes études

Chinese name
- Traditional Chinese: 白樂日
- Simplified Chinese: 白乐日
Transcriptions
Standard Mandarin
- Hanyu Pinyin: Bái Lèrì

Étienne Balazs (born István Balázs; 24 January 1905 – 29 November 1963) was a Hungarian-born French sinologist.

== Major works ==
- Le traité économique du "Soueichou", (Leiden: Brill, 1953). Google Books.
- Le traité juridique du "Soueichou", 1954.
- Chinese Civilization and Bureaucracy; Variations on a Theme. (New Haven: Yale University Press, 1964). Translated by H. M. Wright. Edited by Arthur F. Wright. Google Books. Reprints a selection from Balazs' major articles:

Pt I INSTITUTIONS: • Significant Aspects of Chinese Society • China as a Permanently Bureaucratic Society • Chinese Feudalism • The birth of capitalism in China • Fairs in China • Chinese Towns • Marco Polo in the Capital of China • Evolution of Landownership in Fourth and Fifth Century China • Landownership from the Fourth to the Fourteenth Century

Pt II HISTORY • History as a Guide to Bureaucratic Practive • Tradition and Revolution in China
PT III THOUGHT • Two Songs by Ts' ao Ts' ao • Political Philosophy and Social Crisis at the end of the Han Dynasty • Nihilistic Revolt or Mystical Escapism • A Forerunner of Wang Anshi.

- Political Theory and Administrative Reality in Traditional China. (London: School of Oriental and African Studies, University of London, 1965). With an Introduction by Denis Twitchett
- Histoire et institutions de la Chine ancienne des origines au XIIe siècle après J. C., 1967 (with H. Maspero).
- La Bureaucratie Céleste, Recherches Sur L'économie Et La Société De La Chine Traditionnelle. (Paris: Gallimard, Bibliothèque Des Sciences Humaines, 1968). Revised translation of a collection of articles originally published as Chinese civilization and bureaucracy.
- Françoise Aubin, Balazs Etienne. Etudes Song. In Memoriam Etienne Balazs. (Paris: Mouton, 1970). ISBN 2713203724.
- with Yves Hervouet. A Sung Bibliography. (Hong Kong: The Chinese University Press, 1978). ISBN 9622011586.

== Bibliography ==
- Paul Demiéville, "Étienne Balazs (1905-1963)," T'oung Pao 51.2/3 (1964): 247–261.JSTOR
- Harriet T Zurndorfer, "Not Bound to China: Etienne Balazs, Fernand Braudel and the Politics of the Study of Chinese History in Post-War France," Past & Present 185.1 (2004): 189–221.
- Conrad Schirokauer, "Balazs on China." Journal of the History of Ideas 26.4 (1965): 593–597. JSTOR
- Wolfgang Franke, "Etienne Balazs in Memoriam," Oriens Extremus XII (1965).
