= Henri Gouhier =

French philosopher (1898–1994)

Henri Gouhier (French: [guje]; 5 December 1898 – 31 March 1994) was a French philosopher, a historian of philosophy, and a literary critic.

== Biography ==
Born in Auxerre, Yonne, Gouhier's studies led to a doctorate in 1926. He served as the Professor of philosophy at a lycée in Troyes from 1925 to 1928. Then he taught at the Faculty of Arts at the University of Lille between 1929 and 1940; subsequently, he taught at the University of Bordeaux during 1940 and 1941.

Gouhier was a professor at the Sorbonne for twenty-seven years from 1941 to 1968. In 1979 he was elected to the Académie française and in 1988 was awarded the Prix mondial Cino Del Duca.

Gouhier supervised the undergraduate dissertation of famed sociologist Pierre Bourdieu, a translation of and commentary on Leibniz's Animadversions. He also was a teacher of Michel Foucault and was the chair of his thesis jury.

He died in Paris.

== Honours ==
- Commander of the Legion of Honor
- Grand Officer of the Ordre National du Mérite
- Commander of the Ordre des Arts et des Lettres
