= John Rapp =

John A. Rapp (born 1952) is an American political science professor teaching at Beloit College, USA since 1986. He primarily specialises in "Chinese politics, Communist and post-Communist systems, comparative democracies and electoral systems, and Chinese and comparative political thought."

He contributes regularly to both the publication and the conferences of the Anarchist Studies group. In 2012 Continuum published his book Daoism and Anarchism: Critiques of State Autonomy in Ancient and Modern China as part of their Contemporary Anarchist Studies series. The book won appraise for its contribution to advancing the political context of Daoism and the Dao. He is currently working on a biography project on Issachar J. Roberts, the 19th century southern Baptist China missionary who served as mentor and advisor to the leaders of China’s Taiping Rebellion.

He received his PhD from the University of Wisconsin–Madison.

== Bibliography ==
- Daoism and Anarchism: Critiques of State Autonomy in Ancient and Modern China (New York: Continuum)
- Anarchism or Nihilism?: The Buddhist-Influenced Thought of Wu Nengzi, in Alexandre Christoyannopoulos (ed.), Religious Anarchism: New Perspectives (Newcastle upon Tyne, England: Cambridge Scholars Publishing, 2009)
- Autocracy and China's Rebel Founding Emperors: Comparing Chairman Mao and Ming Taizu (coauthored with Anita Andrew) (Lanham, MD: Rowman & Littlefield Press, 2000)
- Clashing Dilemmas: Hong Rengan, Issachar Roberts, and a Taiping 'Murder' Mystery, Journal of Historical Biography 4 (Autumn 2008): pages 27-58, online at https://www.ufv.ca/jhb/Volume_4/Volume_4_Rapp.pdf
- Daoism as Utopian or Accommodationist: Radical Daoism Reexamined in Light of the Guodian Manuscripts, in Laurence Davis and Ruth Kinna (eds.), Anarchism and Utopianism (University of Manchester Press, 2009)
- Maoism and Anarchism: Mao Zedong's Response to the Anarchist Critique of Marxism, Anarchist Studies 9 (2001): 3-28; "Daoism and Anarchism Reconsidered," Anarchist Studies 6: 2 (October 1998): pages 123-152
- The Fate of Marxist Democrats in Leninist Party-States: China's Debate on the Asiatic Mode of Production, Theory and Society 16 (1987): pages 709-740.
- Utopian, Anti-Utopian, and Dystopian Ideas in Philosophical Daoism, Comparative Asian Development 2:2 (Fall 2003): pages 211-231
