= Gabriel de Foigny =

Gabriel de Foigny (ca. 1630–1692), born in Picardy, is the author of an important utopia, The Southern Land, Known, 1676.

== Life ==
All that is known about Foigny, including his identity (the book was printed without his name), is based exclusively on the second edition of Pierre Bayle's Dictionnaire historique et critique (1701, under "Sadeur"). He was born in Lorraine and became a Franciscan, but left the order. He moved near Geneva, now as a Protestant, and made a living as a tutor. The Southern Land, Known was printed at Geneva, as if from Vannes.

== In English ==
- Gabriel de Foigny. The Southern Land, Known (La Terre Australe connue, 1676). Trans. and ed. David Fausett. Syracuse UP, 1993

== Bibliography ==
- Everett F. Bleiler. French Voyages into Imaginary Lands, in: Science Fiction Studies # 63 = Volume 21, Part 2 = July 1994
- Geoffroy Atkinson, The Extraordinary Voyage in French Literature Before 1700, 1920 (reissue 1966, AMS Press, Columbia University studies in Romance philology and literature; also in Google books)
- Marrone Caterina, Le lingue utopiche Nuovi Equilibri, Viterbo, 2004 [1995], p. 338, ISBN 88-7226-815-X
