= Socialisme ou Barbarie =

French socialist group known for their magazine of the same name

Socialism or Barbarism Socialisme ou Barbarie
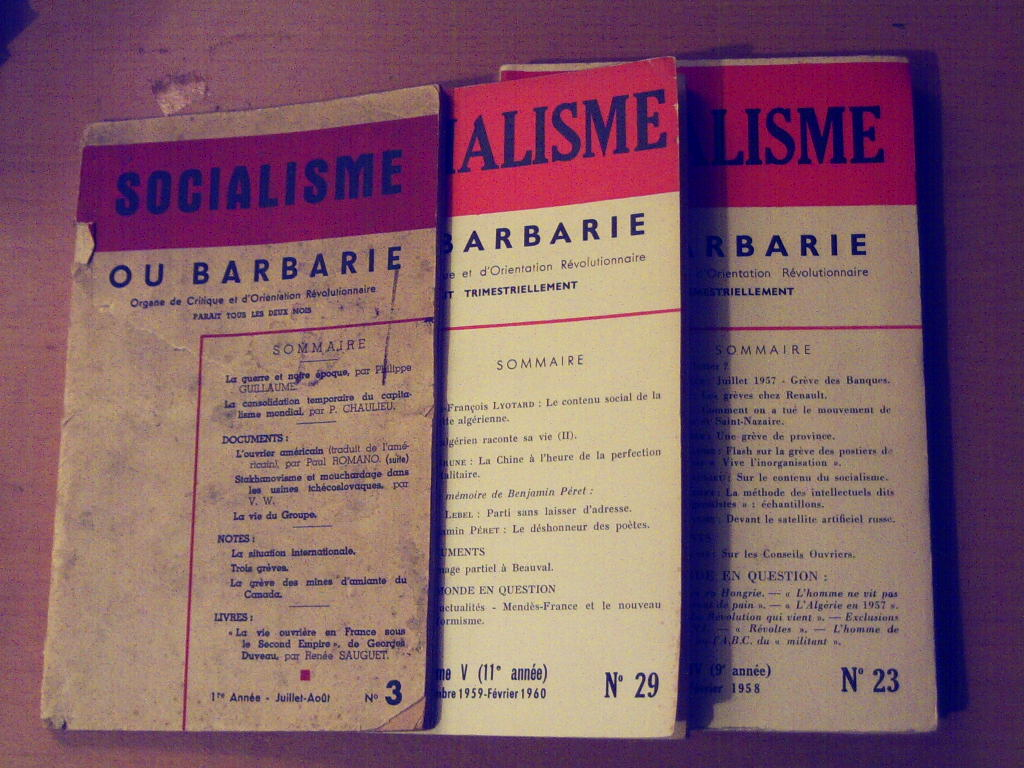
- Copies of the journal Socialisme ou Barbarie
- Abbreviation: SouB
- Leader: Cornelius Castoriadis
- Founders: Cornelius Castoriadis; Claude Lefort; Jean Laplanche
- Founded: 1948
- Dissolved: June 1967
- Split from: Internationalist Communist Party
- Newspaper: Socialisme ou Barbarie
- Membership (1960): 100
- Ideology: Libertarian socialism Council communism
- Political position: Far-left
- British sister organisation: Solidarity

Socialisme ou Barbarie (Note: French: [sɔsjalizm u baʁbaʁi]) (SouB; "Socialism or Barbarism") was a French-based radical libertarian socialist group of the post-World War II period whose name comes from a phrase which was misattributed to Friedrich Engels by Rosa Luxemburg in the Junius Pamphlet, but which probably was most likely first used by Karl Kautsky. It existed from 1948 until 1967. The animating personality was Cornelius Castoriadis, also known as "Pierre Chaulieu" or "Paul Cardan." Socialisme ou Barbarie (S ou B) is also the name of the group's journal.

The group was defined as an "enterprise of revolutionary critique and orientation" and was occupied with "combatting exploitation and alienation."

== History ==
The group originated in the Trotskyist Fourth International, where Castoriadis and Claude Lefort constituted a Chaulieu–Montal tendency – so called after their pseudonyms "Pierre Chaulieu" (Castoriadis) and "Claude Montal" (Lefort) – in the French Parti Communiste Internationaliste in 1946. Castoriadis had links with the group known as the Johnson–Forest Tendency (a 1945–1962 Trotskyist tendency in the United States associated with the Soviet-critical theorists C. L. R. James and Raya Dunayevskaya).

In 1948, the group experienced their "final disenchantment with Trotskyism", leading them to break away to form Socialisme ou Barbarie, whose journal began appearing in March 1949. Castoriadis later said of this period that "the main audience of the group and of the journal was formed by groups of the old, radical left: Bordigists, council communists, some anarchists and some offspring of the German 'left' of the 1920s."

SouB developed parallel to, and were in dialogue with, the Johnson–Forest Tendency, which developed as a body of ideas within American Trotskyist organisations; one faction of this group later formed Facing Reality (1962–1970). The early days also brought debate with Anton Pannekoek and an influx of ex-Bordigists (such as Alberto Masó) into the group.

The group was composed of both intellectuals and workers, and agreed with the idea that the main enemies of society were the bureaucracies which governed modern capitalism. They documented and analysed the struggle against that bureaucracy in the group's journal. The thirteenth issue (January–March 1954), as an example, was devoted to the East German revolt of June 1953 and the strikes which erupted amongst several sectors of French workers that summer. Following from the belief that what the working class was addressing in their daily struggles was the real content of socialism, the intellectuals encouraged the workers in the group to report on every aspect of their working lives.

Socialisme ou Barbarie was critical of Leninism, rejecting the idea of a revolutionary party, and placing an emphasis on the importance of workers' councils. While some members left to form other groups, those remaining became more and more critical of Marxism over time. Jean Laplanche, one of the group's founding members, recalls the early days of the organization:

the atmosphere soon became impossible. Castoriadis exerted hegemony over the journal (he wrote the main articles) and his central idea in the mid-1950s was that a third world war was inevitable. This was very hard for people in the group to stand: to continue our lives, while thinking there would be an atomic explosion in a few years' time. It was an apocalyptic vision.

The Hungarian Revolution and other events of the mid-1950s led to a further influx into the group. By this time, they were proposing the fundamental point as

the necessity for capitalism on the one hand to reduce workers to simple executors of tasks, and on the other hand, in its impossibility to continue functioning if it succeeds in so doing. Capitalism needs to achieve mutually incompatible objectives: the participation and the exclusion of the worker in production – as of all citizens in relation to politics.

This became characterised as a distinction between the dirigeant and exécutant in French, usually translated as order-givers and order-takers. This perspective enabled the group to extend its understanding to the new forms of social conflict emerging outside the realm of production as such. That was also the case for the 1960–1961 Winter General Strike in Wallonia.

=== Post-1958 splits and influence ===
After the May 1958 crisis and an influx of new meeting attendees, disagreements on the organisational role of a political group led to the departure of some prominent members including Claude Lefort and Henri Simon to form Information et Liaisons Ouvrières – ILO ("Workers' Information and Liaisons"; 1958–1960), which represented the anti-vanguardist pole against the Castoriadis-majority line. After Lefort's departure in 1960, that group became Informations et Correspondance Ouvrières – ICO ("Workers' Information and Correspondence"; 1960–1973).

By 1960, SouB had grown to around 100 members and had developed new international links, primarily in the emergence of a sister organisation in Britain called Solidarity.

In June 1963, disputes within the group around Castoriadis' increasing rejection of Marxism led to the departure of the group around the Pouvoir Ouvrier (PO; Worker Power) journal; the group of the same name (whose members included Jean-François Lyotard) existed from 1963 to 1969 and believed that a revolutionary organisation was necessary to help bring about the establishment of workers' councils.

The SouB journal continued publishing until a final edition in 1965, after which the group became dormant and announced its indefinite suspension in June 1967.

The Situationist International (1957–1972) was influenced by Socialisme ou Barbarie through Guy Debord (who was a member of both), as too was Socialisme ou Barbarie influenced by Debord and the Situationists. The Italian social movement of Autonomia was also influenced, but less directly. Castoriadis' ideas as expressed in SouB were a significant influence on participants in May 68 – a fact acknowledged by Daniel Cohn-Bendit.

In 1975, Simon was involved in ICO's successor group Échanges et mouvement (Exchanges and Movement) or simply Échanges. After Simon's death, Échanges disbanded in 2025.

== Members ==
Members of Socialisme ou Barbarie included:

- Gilles Lipovetsky, b. 1944.
- Vincent Descombes, b. 1943.
- Danièle Auffray, b. 1943. Left SouB around 1965.
- Daniel Blanchard (as Pierre Canjuers) (1934–2024). SouB: 1957–1965.
  - Pierre Canjuers, Guy Debord: Preliminaires pour une définition de l'unité du programme révolutionaire, Paris (July 20), 1960 (4 p.).
  - Transl. in: Ken Knabb, Situationist International Anthology, Berkeley, 1981, p. 305ff.
- Cornelius Castoriadis (as Pierre Chaulieu or Paul Cardan) (1922–1997).
  - Various reprints, Union Génerale d'Éditions, 10/18 series, 7 Vols., 3 in 2 books, Paris, 1973 to 1979; Political and Social Writings, David Ames Curtis (editor, transl.), 3 Vols., Minneapolis, 1988, 1993.
- Hubert Damisch (1928–2017). SouB: 1953–1958.
- Guy Debord (1931–1994). SouB: One year from 1960 to 1961. Programmatic statement, with Daniel Blanchard.
- Jacques Gautrat (as Daniel Mothé), (1924-2026). SouB from 1952. As Daniel Mothé: Journal d'un ouvrier, 1956-1958, Éditions de Minuit, Paris, 1959.
- Gérard Genette (1930–2018). SouB: 1957–1958.
- Pierre Guillaume (1941–2023). SouB: 1960–1963 (PO).
- Alain Guillerm (1944–2005). SouB: 1962–1967.
- Jean Laplanche (as Marc Foucault) (1924–2012).
- Claude Lefort (as Claude Montal) (1924–2010). SouB until 1958.
- Jean-François Lyotard (as François Laborde) (1924–1998). SouB: 1954–1963 (PO).
- Alberto Masó (as Albert Véga or R. Maille) (1918–2001). Spanish former member of POUM. SouB: 1950–1963 (PO). La Bataille socialiste Masó page.
- Edgar Morin (1921–2026) (some sources have him as a member in the early 1950s).
- Henri Simon (1922–2024). SouB: 1952–1958.
- Ngo Van (1913–2005).
- Pierre Souyri (as Pierre Brune) (1925–1981). SouB: 1954–1963 (PO). La Bataille socialiste Souyri page.
- Benno Sternberg (as Hugo Bell, Sarel, Barois), member from 1949 to 1967. He died in 1971. As Benno Sarel: La classe ouvrière en Allemagne orientale, Éditions Ouvrières, Paris 1958 (Turin, 1959; Munich, 1975).
- Translated for SouB: Paul Romano and Ria Stone: The American Worker, Bewick, Detroit, 1947.

Source: Andrea Gabler: Arbeitsanalyse und Selbstbestimmung. Zur Bedeutung und Aktualität von "Socialisme ou Barbarie", Göttingen, 2006. This is a dissertation for the Doktor (Ph.D.) in social sciences from the Georg-August-Universität Göttingen. Her many biographies are in Anhang C, pp. 210–223.

== Editions ==
- The forty issues of Socialisme ou barbarie have been digitised and there have been numerous reprints of SouB articles under the name of their authors, especially of Castoriadis' texts.
- A Socialisme ou Barbarie Anthology: Autonomy, Critique, and Revolution in the Age of Bureaucratic Capitalism. London: Eris: 2018. A complete translation of the 2007 Acratie Anthologie, plus additional translations of Socialisme ou Barbarie texts dealing with American and British workers' struggle.

== See also ==
- Potere Operaio

== Bibliography ==
- Di Pierro, Mattia (2023). "Socialisme ou Barbarie". Claude Lefort's Political Philosophy. Political Philosophy and Public Purpose. Palgrave Macmillan. pp. 19–49. doi:10.1007/978-3-031-36378-8_2.
- Hastings-King, Stephen (1997). "On the Marxist Imaginary and the Problem of Practice: Socialisme Ou Barbarie, 1952-6". Thesis Eleven. 49 (1): 69–84. doi:10.1177/0725513697049000006.
- Hastings-King, Stephen (1999). "L'Internationale Situationniste, Socialisme ou Barbarie, and the Crisis of the Marxist Imaginary". SubStance. 28 (3): 26–54. doi:10.1353/sub.2006.0007.
- Hastings-King, Stephen (2014). Looking for the Proletariat: Socialisme ou Barbarie and the Problem of Worker Writing. Brill. ISBN 978-90-04-23536-6.
- Papadimitropoulos, Evangelos (2016). "Socialisme ou Barbarie: From Castoriadis' project of individual and collective autonomy to the collaborative commons". TripleC: Communication, Capitalism & Critique. Open Access Journal for a Global Sustainable Information Society. 14 (1): 265–278. ISSN 1726-670X.
- Starr, Peter (1995). Logics of Failed Revolt: French Theory After May '68. Stanford University Press. ISBN 0-8047-2445-8.
- van der Linden, Marcel (1997). "Socialisme ou barbarie: a French revolutionary group (1949-65)". Left History: An Interdisciplinary Journal of Historical Inquiry and Debate. 5 (1): 7–37. doi:10.25071/1913-9632.5323.
