= Henri Simon (Marxist) =

French Marxist militant (1922–2024)

Henri Simon (French: [ɑ̃ʁi simɔ̃]; pseudonym: Roger Berthier; 25 November 1922 – 16 December 2024) was a French Marxist militant and advocate of council communism.

Born in Rozay-en-Brie, he participated in Socialisme ou Barbarie (SouB) and Informations et Correspondance Ouvrières (ICO), and, from 1975 onward, was involved in ICO's successor group Échanges et mouvement (Exchanges and Movement) or simply Échanges.

Simon turned 100 on 25 November 2022 and died on 16 December 2024 in Visan, at the age of 102.

After Simon's death, Échanges disbanded in 2025.

== Works ==
- Une expérience d’organisation ouvrière. Le Conseil ouvrier|Conseil du personnel des Assurances Générales-Vie, 1957 (2nd ed.: 2002).
- Le 25 juin 1976 en Pologne : travailleurs contre capital, Spartacus, 1977.
- (with Cajo Brendel), De l'anti-franquisme à l'après-franquisme. Illusions politiques et lutte de classe, Spartacus, 1979, 172 p.
- Pologne 1980-82, lutte de classes et crise du capital, Spartacus, 1982.
- To the bitter end: Grève des mineurs en Grande-Bretagne (mars 1984-mars 1985), Acratie, 1987.
