= Ruth Kinna =

British political scientist (born 1961)

Ruth Kenna
- Born: Ruth Ellen Kinna; March 1961 (age 65)
- Occupation: Professor of political philosophy

Academic background
- Education: Queen Mary University of London (BA); University of Oxford (DPhil)

Academic work
- Discipline: Political philosophy; Anarchist studies
- Institutions: Loughborough University (1992–present)
- Website: Ruth Kinna publications on Academia.edu

Ruth Ellen Kinna (born March 1961) is a British historian and theorist of anarchism. She is Professor of Political Philosophy in the Department of Politics, History and International Relations of Loughborough University. She is also one of the two co-editors of the journal Anarchist Studies.

Kinna holds a BA in history and politics from Queen Mary University of London and a D.Phil in politics from the University of Oxford on Kropotkin's theory of mutual aid. She joined Loughborough University in 1992, where she initially focused on the socialist thought of William Morris (1834–1896).

She has written and co-written many articles, books and contributions to books; also she has edited and co-edited several books on the history and theory of anarchism.

== Publications ==
=== Articles ===
- Kinna, Ruth (1992). "Kropotkin and Huxley". Politics. 12 (2): 42–47.
- —— (1995). "Kropotkin's theory of mutual aid in historical context" (PDF). International Review of Social History. 40 (2): 250–283.
- —— (2000). "William Morris: Art, Work, and Leisure" (PDF). Journal of the History of Ideas. 61 (3): 493–512.
- —— (2007). "Fields of vision: Kropotkin and revolutionary change" (PDF). SubStance. 36 (2): 67–86.
- (With Alex Prichard) —— (2019). "Anarchism and non-domination". Journal of Political Ideologies. 24 (3): 221–240. doi:10.1080/13569317.2019.1633100. hdl:10871/30200.
- (With Alex Pritchard and Thomas Swann) —— (2019). "Occupy and the constitution of anarchy" (PDF). Global Constitutionalism. 8 (2): 357–390.
- —— (2021). "What is anarchist internationalism?". Nations and Nationalism. 27 (4): 976–991. doi:10.1111/nana.12676.
- (With José A. Gutiérrez) —— (2023). "Introduction. Anarchism and the national question—historical, theoretical and contemporary perspectives". Nations and Nationalism. 29 (1): 121–130. doi:10.1111/nana.12891.

=== Chapters ===
- (With Alex Pritchard) Kinna, Ruth (2009). "Anarchism: Past, present, and utopia". In Amster, Randall; DeLeon, Abraham; Fernandez, Luis A.; Nocella II, Anthony J.; Shannon, Deric (eds.). Contemporary Anarchist Studies An introductory anthology of anarchy in the academy. Abingdon, Oxfordshire: Routledge. ISBN 978-0-415-47401-6.
- —— (2016). "Utopianism and prefiguration". In Chrostowska, S.D.; Ingram, James D. (eds.). Political uses of utopia New Marxist, anarchist, and radical democratic perspectives. New York: Columbia University Press. ISBN 9780231179584.
- —— (2018). "Anarchism and feminism". In Jun, N.J. (ed.). Brill's Companion to Anarchism and Philosophy. Leiden, The Netherlands: Koninklijke Brill. ISBN 978-90-04-35688-7.

=== Books ===
- Kinna, Ruth (2000). William Morris: The Art of Socialism. Cardiff: University of Wales Press. ISBN 978-0-70831-582-8.
- —— (2005). Anarchism - A Beginners Guide. Oxford: Oneworld Publications. ISBN 1-85168-370-4.
- —— (2016). Kropotkin: Reviewing the Classical Anarchist Tradition. Edinburgh University Press. ISBN 978-0-7486-4229-8.
- —— (2020). The government of no one The theory and practice of anarchism. London: Pelican Books. ISBN 978-0241396551.
- (With Colin Harper) —— (2020). Great Anarchists. www.dogsection.org: Dog Section Press | Active Distribution. ISBN 9781916036567.
- (With Alex Pritchard, Thomas Swann and Seeds for Change) —— (2023). Anarchic agreements A field guide to building groups and coalitions. Oakland, California: PM Press. ISBN 978-1-62963-963-5.
- (With Colin Ward) —— (2023). Anarchism: People and ideas (Second ed.). Nottingham: Five Leaves Publications. ISBN 978-1915434029.
- (With Peter Kropotkin) —— (2023). Mutual aid A factor of evolution. warblerpress.com: Warbler Press. ISBN 978-1-959891-42-0.

=== Editorships ===
- Kinna, Ruth (2012). The Continuum companion to anarchism (PDF). London: Continuum. ISBN 978-1-4411-4270-2.
- (With Alex Pritchard, Saku Pinta and David Berry) —— (2017). Libertarian Socialism: Politics in black and red. Oakland, California: PM Press. ISBN 978-1-62963-390-9.
- (With Uri Gordon) —— (2019). Routledge Handbook of Radical Politics. New York, NY: Routledge. ISBN 9781315619880.
- (With Laurence Davis) —— (2024) [originally 2009]. Anarchism and utopianism. Manchester: Manchester University Press. ISBN 978-0-7190-9667-9.
