= Sens & Tonka =

French publishing house

Sens & Tonka is a French publishing house that was founded in 1994 by Jeanne-Marie Sens and Hubert Tonka. Publications are typically about relatively serious subjects such as architecture, the arts and politics. Authors include Jean-Marie Apostolidès, Miguel Abensour, Marcel Gauchet, Olivier Jacquemond, Mehdi Belhaj Kacem, Sylvère Lotringer, Philippe Di Folco, Günther Anders, Jean Baudrillard, Auguste Blanqui, Pierre Clastres, Gilles Clément, Chloé Delaume, Édouard Dor, Lawrence Ferlinghetti, Olivier Jacquemond, Louis Janover, Franck Laroze, Fréderic Neyrat, Léo Scheer, and Paul Virilio.
