= Michel Cartry =

French anthropologist

Michel Cartry (1931–2008) was a French Africanist and anthropologist of religion.

== Life ==
Cartry studied philosophy at the Sorbonne in Paris, where he met Félix Guattari in June 1952 and was "initiated [...] into Trotsky" by him. He also came to know Gilles Deleuze, taking his class on Hume in 1957. He was one of several young philosophers - including Alfred Adler, Pierre Clastres and Lucien Sebag - who left the French Communist Party after 1956 and turned towards anthropology, attending the seminar of Claude Lévi-Strauss. Georges Balandier found him a job monitoring research literature on Africa at the Centre d'Etudes et de Recherches Internationales (CERI) at Sciences Po, where he was joined by Pierre Bonnafé and Emmanuel Terray. After travelling to Upper Volta in 1962, he developed a particular interest in religion, studying ritual and divination. He worked as a researcher at the CNRS before succeeding Germaine Dieterlen as Director of Studies at the Ecole Pratique des Hautes Etudes. As a Director of CNRS-EPHE, he led a research programme into 'Systems of Thought in Black Africa' until 1991.

== Works ==
- L'Afrique au sud du Sahara, Paris: Fondation nationale des sciences politiques, 1962
- 'Note sur les signes graphiques du géomancien gourmantché', Journal de la Société des Africanistes, 1963
- (with Alfred Adler) 'La transgression et sa dérision', L'Homme, July 1971.
- 'Clans, lignages et groupements familiaux chez les Gour- mantché,' L'Homme
- (ed.) La notion de personne en Afrique noire, 1973
- Sous le masque de l'animal : essais sur le sacrifice en Afrique noire, Paris : Presses universitaires de France, 1987
- 'From one rite to another: the memory in ritual and the ethnologist's recollection', in Daniel de Coppet, Understanding rituals, Routledge, 1992, pp. 26–51
- (ed. with Marcel Detienne) Destins de meurtriers, Paris : Ecole pratique des hautes études (section des sciences religieuses), 1996. Systèmes de pensée en Afrique noire 14.
- 'De la divination au sacrifice: la métaphore de l’attache', in Architecturer l’invisible. Autels, ligatures, écritures, Turnhout, Brepols, 2009.
