= Ethnology =

Branch of anthropology

Ethnology (from the Ancient Greek: ἔθνος, ethnos meaning 'nation') is an academic field and discipline that compares and analyzes the characteristics of different peoples and the relationships between them (compare cultural, social, or sociocultural anthropology).

== Scientific discipline ==
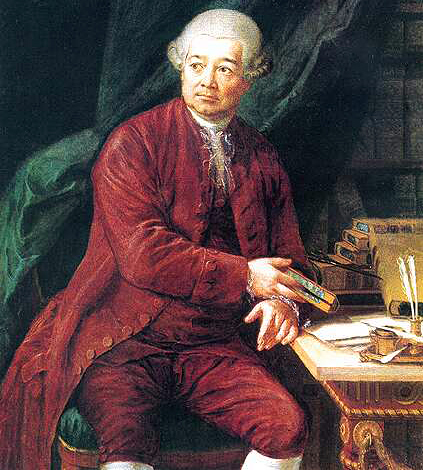
Adam František Kollár, 1779

Compared to ethnography, the study of single groups through direct contact with the culture, ethnology takes the research that ethnographers have compiled and then compares and contrasts different cultures.

The term ethnologia (ethnology) is credited to Adam Franz Kollár (1718–1783) who used and defined it in his Historiae ivrisqve pvblici Regni Vngariae amoenitates published in Vienna in 1783. as: "the science of nations and peoples, or, that study of learned men in which they inquire into the origins, languages, customs, and institutions of various nations, and finally into the fatherland and ancient seats, in order to be able better to judge the nations and peoples in their own times."

Kollár's interest in linguistic and cultural diversity was aroused by the situation in his native multi-ethnic and multilingual Kingdom of Hungary and his roots among its Slovaks, and by the shifts that began to emerge after the gradual retreat of the Ottoman Empire in the more distant Balkans.

Among the goals of ethnology have been the reconstruction of human history, and the formulation of cultural invariants, such as the incest taboo and culture change, and the formulation of generalizations about "human nature", a concept which has been criticized since the 19th century by various philosophers (Hegel, Marx, structuralism, etc.). In some parts of the world, ethnology has developed along independent paths of investigation and pedagogical doctrine, with cultural anthropology becoming dominant especially in the United States, and social anthropology in Great Britain. The distinction between the three terms is increasingly blurry. Ethnology has been considered an academic field since the late 18th century, especially in Europe and is sometimes conceived of as any comparative study of human groups.

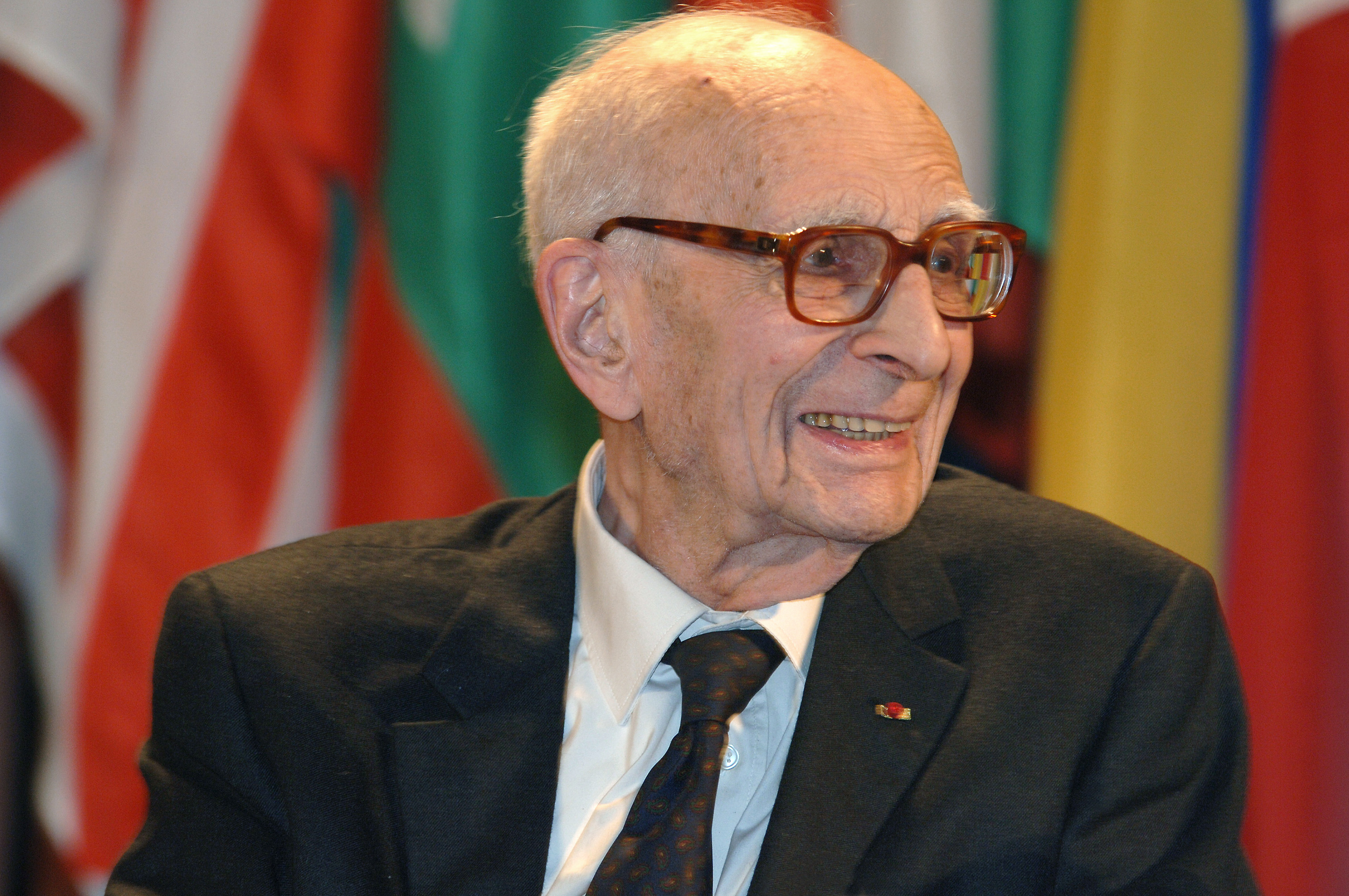
Claude Lévi-Strauss

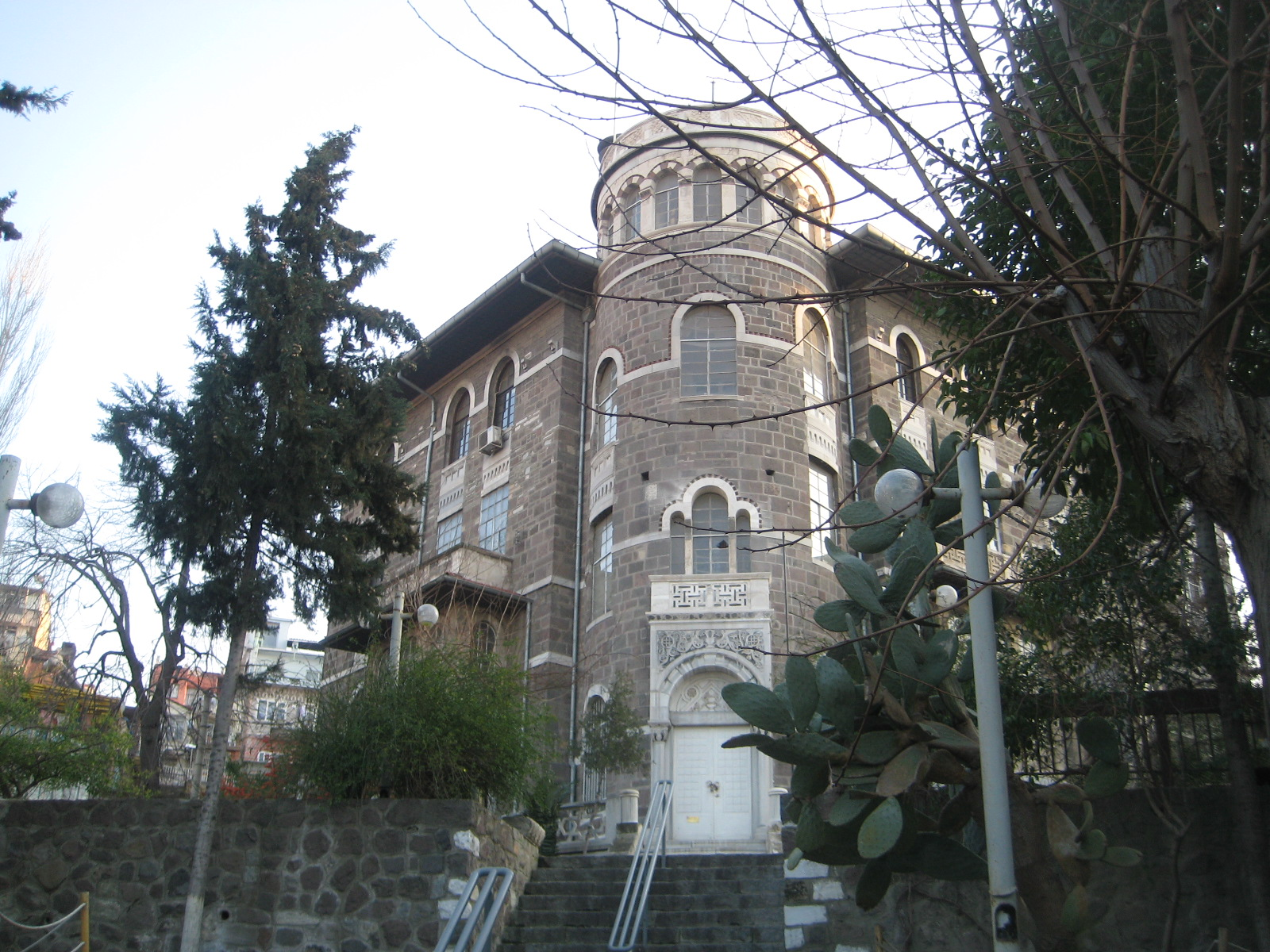
İzmir Ethnography Museum seen from the courtyard

The 15th-century exploration of America by European explorers had an important role in formulating new notions of the Occident (the Western world), such as the notion of the "Other". This term was used in conjunction with "savages", which was either seen as a brutal barbarian, or alternatively, as the "noble savage". Thus, civilization was opposed in a dualist manner to barbary, a classic opposition constitutive of the even more commonly shared ethnocentrism. The progress of ethnology, for example with Claude Lévi-Strauss's structural anthropology, led to the criticism of conceptions of a linear progress, or the pseudo-opposition between "societies with histories" and "societies without histories", judged too dependent on a limited view of history as constituted by accumulative growth.

Lévi-Strauss often referred to Montaigne's essay on cannibalism as an early example of ethnology. Lévi-Strauss aimed, through a structural method, at discovering universal invariants in human society, chief among which he believed to be the incest taboo. However, the claims of such cultural universalism have been criticized by various 19th- and 20th-century social thinkers, including Marx, Nietzsche, Foucault, Derrida, Althusser, and Deleuze.

The French school of ethnology was particularly significant for the development of the discipline, since the early 1950s. Important figures in this movement have included Lévi-Strauss, Paul Rivet, Marcel Griaule, Germaine Dieterlen, and Jean Rouch.

== See also ==
- Anthropology
- Comparative cultural studies
- Cross-cultural studies
- Ethnography
- Folklore studies
- Ethnocentrism
- Intangible cultural heritage
- Scientific racism
- Structural anthropology
- Structural functionalism
- Ethnic studies
- Cultural studies

== Bibliography ==
- Forster, Johann Georg Adam. Voyage round the World in His Britannic Majesty's Sloop, Resolution, Commanded by Capt. James Cook, during the Years 1772, 3, 4, and 5 (2 vols), London (1777).
- Lévi-Strauss, Claude. The Elementary Structures of Kinship, (1949), Structural Anthropology (1958)
- Mauss, Marcel. originally published as Essai sur le don. Forme et raison de l'échange dans les sociétés archaïques in 1925, this classic text on gift economy appears in the English edition as The Gift: The Form and Reason for Exchange in Archaic Societies.
- Maybury-Lewis, David. Akwe-Shavante society (1967), The Politics of Ethnicity: Indigenous Peoples in Latin American States (2003).
- Clastres, Pierre. Society Against the State (1974).
- Pop, Mihai and Glauco Sanga. "Problemi generali dell'etnologia europea", La Ricerca Folklorica, No. 1, La cultura popolare. Questioni teoriche (April 1980), pp. 89–96.
