= Miguel Abensour =

French philosopher (1939–2017)

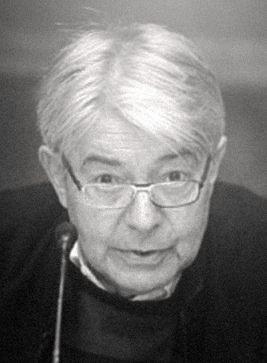
- Miguel Abensour
- Born: 13 February 1939; Paris, France
- Died: 22 April 2017 (aged 78); Paris, France

Philosophical work
- School: Continental philosophy Libertarian socialism
- Institutions: University of Paris VIII
- Main interests: Political philosophy, history of ideas, democracy, emancipation, revolution, totalitarianism, utopia
- Notable works: Democracy Against the State (1997)
- Notable ideas: New utopian spirit, insurgent democracy

Miguel Abensour (French: [abɑ̃suʁ]; 13 February 1939 – 22 April 2017) was a French philosopher specializing in political philosophy.

Beginning his academic career as a professor of political science at Dijon, then at the University of Reims, before teaching political philosophy at the Paris Diderot University (Jussieu), where he became emeritus professor. Founder and director of the editorial collection "Critique de la politique" at Payot and president of the Collège international de philosophie from 1985 to 1987, he is generally viewed as a left-libertarian thinker and as a theoretician of radical democracy.

With thinkers such as Claude Lefort, Pierre Clastres, Cornelius Castoriadis, and Marcel Gauchet, Abensour greatly contributed to the renewal of French political philosophy in the post-war period. Aware of the many controversies surrounding the legacy, history, and historiography of the French Revolution in France, he examined the contradictions of the French revolutionaries and commented their texts (especially Saint-Just). In the wake of the rediscovery of Karl Marx, notably his early writings, Abensour aimed to distinguish Marx's own thought from Marxism. After the advent of the Nazi regime and the Shoah, the Italian fascism and against Soviet totalitarianism, Abensour questioned the nature of those totalitarian experiences in which he sees the blossoming of domination and the vanishing of politics. Moreover, while several political leaders in France and worldwide have advocated for liberal democracy, Abensour emphasized the distinction between representative government and democracy.

In the same spirit of critique, Abensour has offered many studies on Theodor W. Adorno, Hannah Arendt, and Emmanuel Levinas. He examined the history of utopia and identified in it a "new utopian spirit." Finally, Abensour has developed a conception of democracy that he refers to as "insurgent democracy." This complex idea, akin to other theories of radical democracy, insists on the dissolution of the State-form and political domination as the authentic democratic moment per excellence.

Whether in his work as an editor, as a thinker, or as a public intellectual, Miguel Abensour always reflected on the emancipation of the oppressed. Acting as the guiding thread of his thought, the question posed by Étienne de La Boétie never left him: "why does the majority of the oppressed not revolt?" Eventually, he reframed this fundamental question with the terms set by Baruch Spinoza: "why do men fight for their servitude as if it were for their own salvation?"

== Biography ==
=== Early life ===
Born in February 1939 to parents who came to France from French Algeria only a few months before the beginning of World War II, Abensour had to live in hiding during the Occupation, as his father was Jewish. The family left Paris and settled in a village in the Lower Pyrénées. Reflecting on this period of his life in a lengthy interview conducted by Michel Enaudeau, he stated:

We lived in a small village, and my parents had pointed out to me the houses that we had to avoid and the people not to talk to. It's undoubtedly extremely unsettling for a child to realize that the world in which they live every day is divided in two and includes dangerous places and people.

— Miguel Abensour, La Communauté politique des "tous uns", p. 12 [translation]

After the war, his father worked as a German interpreter at the Nuremberg trials. In the same interview with Enaudeau, the philosopher recounted another disquieting episode from his childhood:

Around the age of twelve, I searched through his bookshelf and found, mixed in with the trial documents, a volume of related photographs about the death camps. This book suddenly introduced me to an unsuspected universe that defied all thought. I remember the photos of deportees, whose gazes called out to me as if they were from another planet; I remember heaps, actual piles of glasses several meters high, poignant images of mass killings. These images have never left me.

— Miguel Abensour, La Communauté des "tous uns", p. 376 [translation]

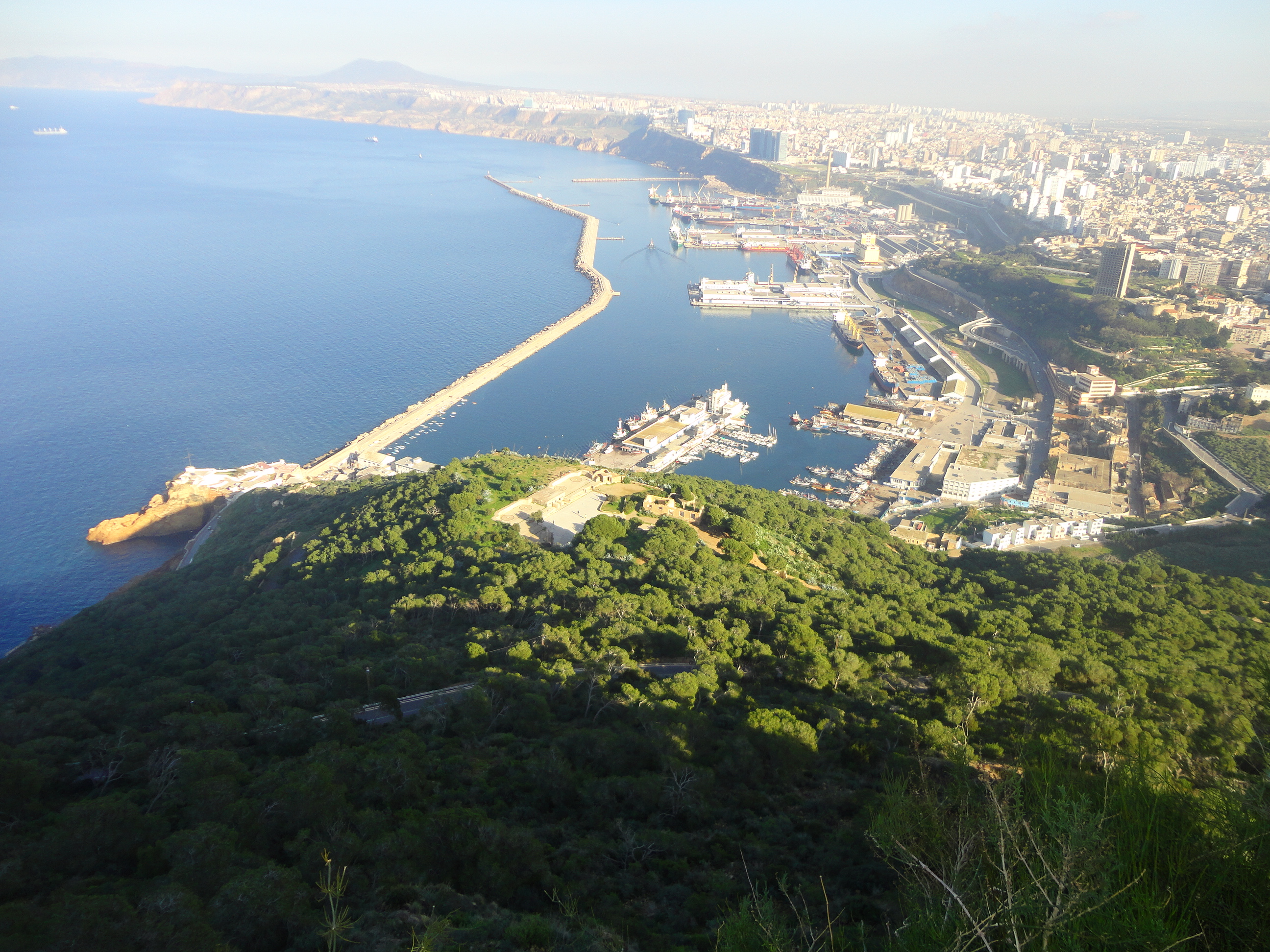
Picture of the city of Oran (Algeria), taken from Mount Aïdour (2013).

Abensour was also deeply marked by the period of the Algerian War, "especially the idea that torture was commonly practiced, even by people who had been part of the [French] resistance.^{[fr]}" In 1957, he spent part of the summer in Oran: "An atmosphere of widespread hatred prevailed there. All communities despised each other. I could also observe the humiliations that Algerians endured daily from the French colonizers.^{[fr]}"

=== Academic career ===
Holding an agrégation in political science, Abensour began his teaching career as a professor of this discipline at Dijon during the 1960s. Later, he spent some time at the CNRS. In 1973, he obtained a PhD in political science after successfully defending in 1973 a thèse d'État on utopia in the 19th century, first supervised by Charles Eisenmann and later by Gilles Deleuze.

During the 1970s, when a doctorate program in political theory was established, he was appointed as a professor of political science at the University of Reims. He established there the Centre de philosophie politique, where Claude Lefort and Pierre Clastres came to present their works. In 1990, he joined the University of Paris VII-Denis Diderot, where he taught until the end of his career and eventually became professor emeritus of political philosophy. Within this university, he took part in the adventure of the Centre de sociologie des pratiques et des représentations politiques and its affiliated journal, Tumultes.

As a professor, he supervised the doctoral theses of several influential figures in the renewal of political philosophy in France, including Luc Ferry, Philippe Raynaud, Jean-Michel Besnier, and Étienne Tassin.

=== Intellectual journey ===
==== From journal to journal ====
Miguel Abensour was "an active figure in the world of journals.^{[fr]}" His first published article, appearing in two installments in the Annales historiques de la Révolution française, was dedicated to Saint-Just. Subsequently, alongside his academic and teaching pursuits, Abensour engaged with various journals such as Textures and Libre. According to Franck Berthot, those two journals played a significant role in the resurgence of political philosophy in France during the turning point of the 1980s with critical discussion of the themes of democracy and totalitarianism, emancipation and domination.

His involvement within these journals was intense, and the debates among collaborators in the various journals were quite lively. In a 2007 interview with Jean-Claude Poizat, reflecting on his journey, Abensour stated, "I am more of a journal-oriented person. I participated in Textures, Libre, Passé-Présent, Tumultes; the practice of writing has the merit of introducing distance between the members of the journal.^{[fr]}"

In the early 1970s Abensour became involved with the journal Textures, created and led by the Belgian phenomenologist Marc Richir. In 1977, along with Cornelius Castoriadis, Pierre Clastres, Marcel Gauchet, Claude Lefort, and Maurice Luciani, he co-founded the journal Libre under the Payot editions.

From 1982 to 1984, he collaborated with the journal Passé-Présent, created and led by Claude Lefort. In the mid-1990s, he contributed to the journal Tumultes, published by the Centre de sociologie des pratiques et des représentations politiques at Paris VII, under the direction of Sonia Dayan-Herzbrun. He also participated, as part of the editorial board, in the journal Épokhé, created and led by Marc Richir.

Finally, in 2017, just before his passing, he co-founded the journal Prismes with Michèle Cohen-Halimi, Anne Kupiec, Géraldine Muhlmann, Katia Genel, and Gilles Moutot. The inaugural volume of Prismes was published in 2018.

==== The Collège international de philosophie ====
In the 1980s, Abensour was involved with the Collège international de philosophie. He chaired its collegial assembly from November 1985 to December 1987, succeeding Jacques Derrida and Jean-François Lyotard. According to Élisabeth de Fontenay, "[Abensour] displayed genuine inventiveness in democratically and effectively directing an institution that was still in the fragility and instability of its nascent state." She points out that he was the one who "established the principle of voting, and it was under the guidance of the executive committee he chaired that the program directors were installed, and thus the new institution of the collegial assembly.^{[fr]}" She also notes that he initiated the "Bibliothèque du Collège international de philosophie" collection with Aubier editions and was the driving force behind the creation of the Cahiers of the Collège international de philosophie, a journal that collected contributions both from within and outside the university, following a model similar to that of the Frankfurt School.

Furthermore, his presidency is remembered for the "Heidegger. Questions ouvertes" colloquium held in March 1987, where Emmanuel Levinas agreed to express his profound ambivalence toward the German philosopher and his implication in the Nazi regime. In a conversation about the history of the Collège international de philosophie, Derrida revisits this colloquium organized by Éliane Escoubas and Abensour: "The example of the Heidegger colloquium—we could cite many others if we had the time—was particularly remarkable in this respect because it took place during the height of the 'Heidegger affair.' I remember interventions where, on one hand, there was evidence of competence in interpreting Heidegger's texts, and on the other hand, various ways of disagreeing with Heidegger were demonstrated, posing questions, especially political ones, to his texts and thoughts without succumbing to media trials and hasty methods that dominated the public scene.^{[fr]}"

==== Conflicts and intellectual friendships ====
Abensour experienced rifts with two founders of the journal Libre: Claude Lefort and Marcel Gauchet. With Lefort, the disagreement arose in the 1990s when Lefort proposed a critique of the French Revolution through the lens of totalitarianism and thus aligned with historian François Furet's interpretation, tendentious in Abensour's eyes.

In the case of Gauchet, the break officially occurred when Gauchet, former friend and colleague, accused Abensour of being a leader of "revoltism". Gauchet used this term to describe the paradoxical stance of a certain anti-totalitarian far-left that struggled to reconcile its love for democracy with an ultracritical posture. According to Gauchet, the aesthetics of intransigence and the cult of rupture don't coexist easily with the idea of collective self-governance. In his response, Abensour dismissed Gauchet's criticisms and embraced the label of "revoltist". While Gauchet, following the decline of the revolutionary horizon and the establishment of a certain liberal reality, saw democracy and revolution as opposed, Abensour argued that this opposition is null since, following the insight of the young Karl Marx in his critique of Hegelian political right, the essence of democracy can only be understood as a continuous effort of resistance and even destruction of the State-form, making democracy the revolutionary regime per excellence.

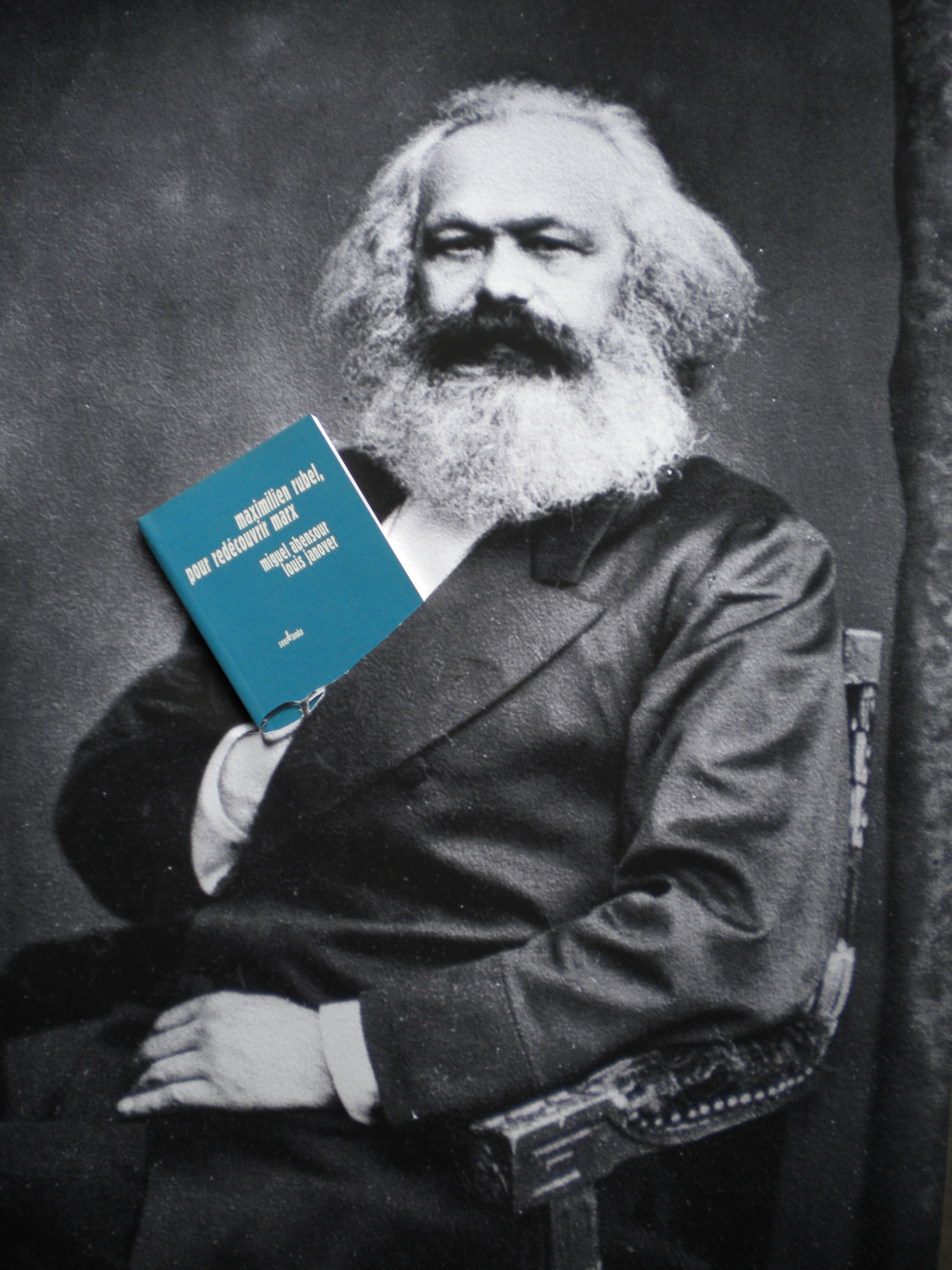
Photomontage of Karl Marx holding the cover of Miguel Abensour and Louis Janover's book, Maximilien Rubel. Pour redécouvrir Marx.

Abensour shared a path with Maximilien Rubel, publishing Rubel's Marx, critique du marxisme in his "Critique de la politique" collection. Upon the publication of Marx's complete works in the Pléiade, Abensour wrote an article titled "Pour lire Marx," defending Rubel's editorial work. He also shared with Rubel "the thesis of a Marx engaged in a unitary critique of bourgeois society, oriented toward a project of radical emancipation.^{[fr]}" When launching a new "Critique de la politique" collection at Klincksieck editions, Abensour republished one of Rubel's books: Karl Marx, essai de biographie intellectuelle.

Abensour also formed a deep friendship and a true intellectual companionship with Louis Janover, who was, among other things, a collaborator with Rubel on the edition of Marx's complete works in the Pléiade. In memory of Rubel, Abensour and Janover published Maximilien Rubel. Pour redécouvrir Marx.

=== Death ===
Abensour died on 22 April 2017, at the age of 78, in Paris. His body rests at the Père-Lachaise Cemetery.

== Life as an editor ==
=== Transmitting works ===
Abensour has been a tireless conveyor of texts. According to Lucia Sagradini, "Miguel Abensour's entire intellectual life has been intertwined with embodying a philosophical thought that has intersected with reading, writing books, as well as the work of transmission, involving authors of Critical theory, whose reception he facilitated in French, and also through his work as a professor throughout the years.^{[fr]}" As such, Abensour ensured the transmission of a considerable number of texts: over a hundred titles in his "Critique de la politique" collection at Payot. Among many of his feats, he published the complete works of Louis Antoine de Saint-Just, he edited a Cahier de L'Herne dedicated to Emmanuel Levinas containing numerous unpublished materials, he organized a colloquium focused on the work of Hannah Arendt at the Collège international de philosophie, he is the one who initiated the French translation of Edward P. Thompson's The Making of the English Working Class, and, as his first editorial effort, he published some texts of Auguste Blanqui.

Moreover, Abensour took it upon himself to keep alive the "Copernican Revolution" that Pierre Clastres introduced into anthropological thought. In May 1982, he organized a two-day colloquium titled "À partir de l’œuvre de Pierre Clastres : anthropologie et politique", with the proceedings published in 1987 in the book L'Esprit des lois sauvages. In November 2009, he directed a colloquium titled "Pierre Clastres et nous. La révolution copernicienne et la question de l'État." Some of the contributions from this colloquium were compiled in 2011 in an edited volume titled Pierre Clastres, which includes letters from André Du Bouchet and Paul Auster. It also features translations of Bento Prado Junior's preface to the Brazilian edition of Clastres' collection of texts Archeology of Violence, Tânia Stoize Lima & Marcio Goldman's preface to Society Against the State, and Paul Auster's introduction to Chronicle of the Guayaki Indians. Lastly, two unpublished texts by Clastres are included in this volume: "Les sauvages sont-ils heureux ?" and "Les derniers Indiens d'Amazonie."

To gauge the amount of texts that have passed through Abensour's hands, one should consult the contributions presented at two colloquia centered around his work; as well as the testimonials gathered in a collective work, Critique de la politique. Autour de Miguel Abensour, and in an issue of the journal Lignes paying homage to him. One should also explore La bibliothèque de Miguel Abensour; in this book, all the books from his personal library are listed, including those he lent to his students.

=== Heading a collection ===
Abensour was the founder of the "Critique de la politique" collection at Payot publishers (from 1974 to 2015). After an editorial dispute, he continued the collection at Klincksieck publishers from 2016 until his passing in 2017, still under the name "Critique de la politique." The collection is now directed by Michèle Cohen-Halimi.

With the expression of "critique de la politique" (or "critique of politics" in English), Abensour, according to Nicolas Poirier, aimed to "designate a constellation of thinkers driven by a shared desire for freedom, as well as practices and events that demonstrate that humans can find within themselves the means to escape servitude.^{[fr]}" Antonia Birnbaum describes the creation of this collection as follows: "A young man, inspired by his readings, returns from the US and proposes to a publisher, Payot, to create an anti-textbook using critical texts from political philosophy. After some difficulty in obtaining rights, the publisher makes him another offer: 'Wouldn't you prefer to create a collection instead?' M. Abensour accepts.^{[fr]}"

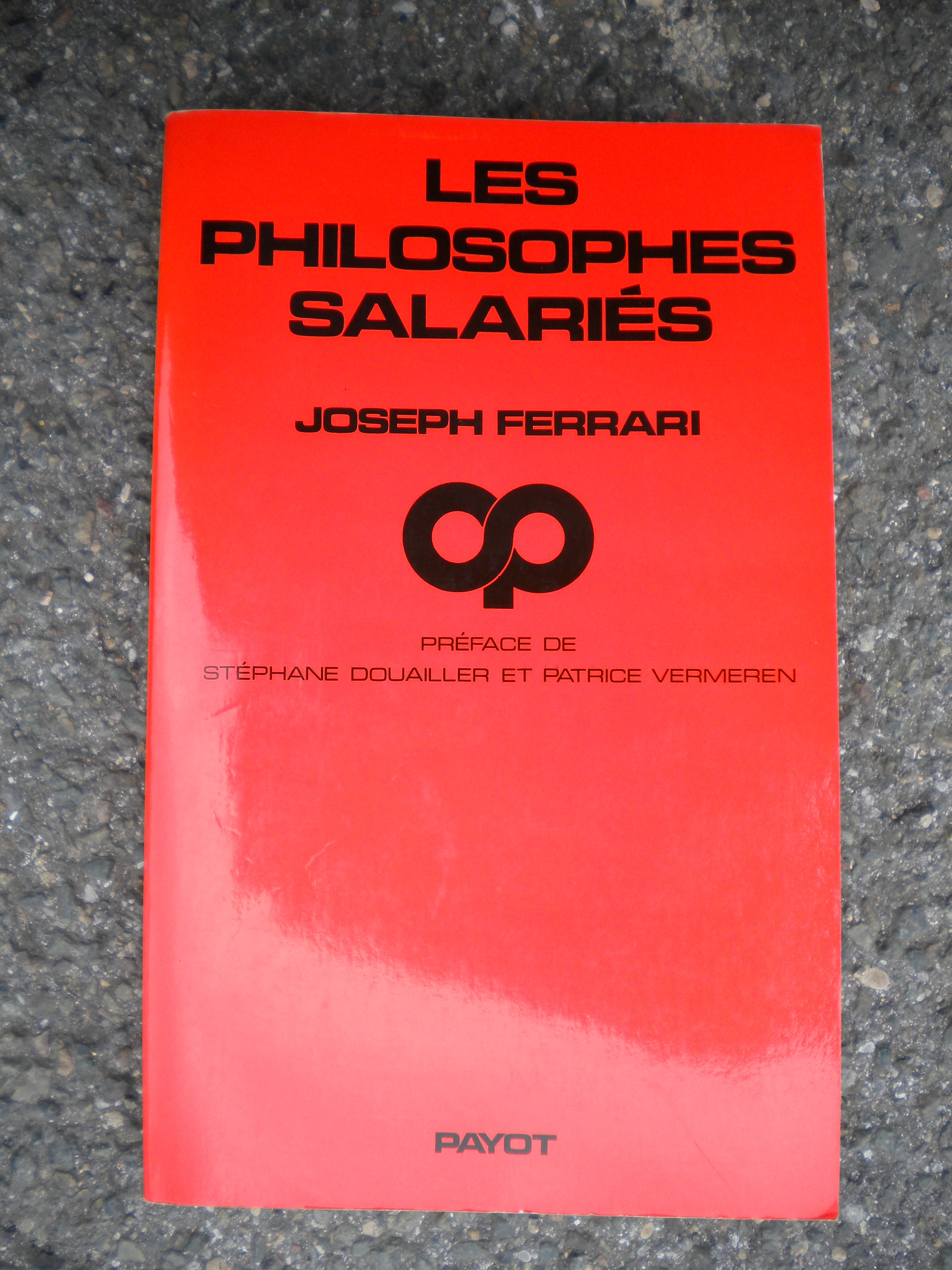
Front cover of Giuseppe (Joseph) Ferrari's book Les philosophes salariés, edited by Abensour in 1983 in his collection "Critique de la politique" (with the logo "CP" appearing beneath the author's name).

In addition to reissuing works by lesser-known authors (Giuseppe Pelli Bencivenni, Jean-Baptiste Cousin de Grainville, or Ferdinand Domela Nieuwenhuis) and publishing the theses of young researchers (Étienne Tassin, Géraldine Muhlmann, Blaise Bachofen, Martin Breaugh, or Nicolas Poirier), Abensour contributed to the dissemination of the writings of the Frankfurt School founders in France by offering translations of their works, such as the first title in the collection with Max Horkheimer's Eclipse of Reason. Later on, he had books translated from Theodor W. Adorno, Franz Neumann, Jürgen Habermas, and Oskar Negt, as well as authors closely associated with the Frankfurt School like Ernst Bloch, Walter Benjamin, or Siegfried Kracauer.

According to Antonia Birnbaum, "It's the connection with emancipation that motivates Miguel Abensour's relationship with books.^{[fr]}" For Nicolas Poirier, "M. Abensour was a publisher for whom the act of publication was an act of thought in its own right.^{[fr]}" Indeed, his editorial activity was an integral part of his philosophical work, and the texts of the authors he published were at the core of his reflection, as seen in this excerpt: "To consider the return of political matters," writes Abensour, "an inquiry is necessary into the relationship between critical theory (Theodor W. Adorno, Max Horkheimer, Herbert Marcuse) and political philosophy. While critical theory tends toward catastrophism, meaning an association between domination and politics, political philosophy, on the contrary, sometimes tends to erase the phenomenon of domination in favor of a political space conceived on the model of an exchange among equal participants. A critical political philosophy should take into account, following La Boétie, especially the fact that domination tends to arise within the political realm.^{[fr]}"

The edition of Étienne de La Boétie's Discourse on Voluntary Servitude has been a "symbolic and inaugural work" of the "Critique de la politique" collection; a clear-cut example of a "critical political approach towards domination.^{[fr]}" This edition, in which future contributors to the journal Libre (Gauchet, Lefort, and Clastres) were involved, was conceived and realized by Abensour.

== Research and works ==
Disseminated throughout numerous articles, intertwined with reflections on utopias, and driven by an "insurgent" conception of democracy, Abensour's thought constitutes a "critical-utopian political philosophy" aimed at emancipation. Below, among the many inquiries pursued by Abensour, his critique of political philosophy, his approach to revolution, his unveiling of an alternative utopia, his concern regarding totalitarianism, and his conception of democracy are discussed

=== Critique of political philosophy ===
Abensour was interested in identifying the essence of politics and its conditions of possibility. He examined the moments when individuals come together to take action or associate for a specific purpose, e.g., a revolt, a revolution, a strike, the creation of councils, etc. Delving into the diversity of political phenomena, he explored their limits, whether in the form of domination, apoliticism, or totalitarianism. Furthermore, he reflected on many kinds of political institutions that embody aspects of political activity such as workers' councils, leadership, assembly, democracy, or the State. He was concerned with determining whether a particular political activity or institution is truly political and what contribution can it make to emancipation. For instance, can totalitarianism, which denies its population any uniqueness, initiative, and ultimately, plurality, be regarded as a political regime?

Furthermore, Abensour questioned the relationship between philosophical activity and political engagement. Abensour believed that political philosophy, both as a lineage of thought and as an academic discipline, tended to subordinate the politics to principles distinct from its own. Drawing inspiration from Hannah Arendt's insights, Abensour asserted that the shift in political philosophy took place during Plato's era, and since then, as an academic discipline, it consistently imposed its own categories and objectives onto "political things" (les choses politiques in English). In other words, Abensour's argument is that political philosophy has inadvertently perpetuated systems of domination while inhibiting the pursuit of genuine emancipation.

=== The French Revolution: a guiding light ===
Abensour was drawn early to the study of revolutionary events: "I began my doctorate around 1965," Abensour stated. "Originally, I planned to study Jacobinism. But I realized it was unfeasible and abandoned the idea.^{[fr]}" Despite abandoning this particular focus, the writings and actions of French Revolutionaries, as well as the interpretation of their endeavors, continued to intrigue him. Indeed, questions about the French Revolution and, on a broader scale, revolutions, resurfaced regularly within Abensour's work. This was evident in his editorial collection "Critique de la politique," interviews, and texts. Above all, for Abensour, the notion of revolution "more than any other event, takes part in the core of history.^{[fr]}"

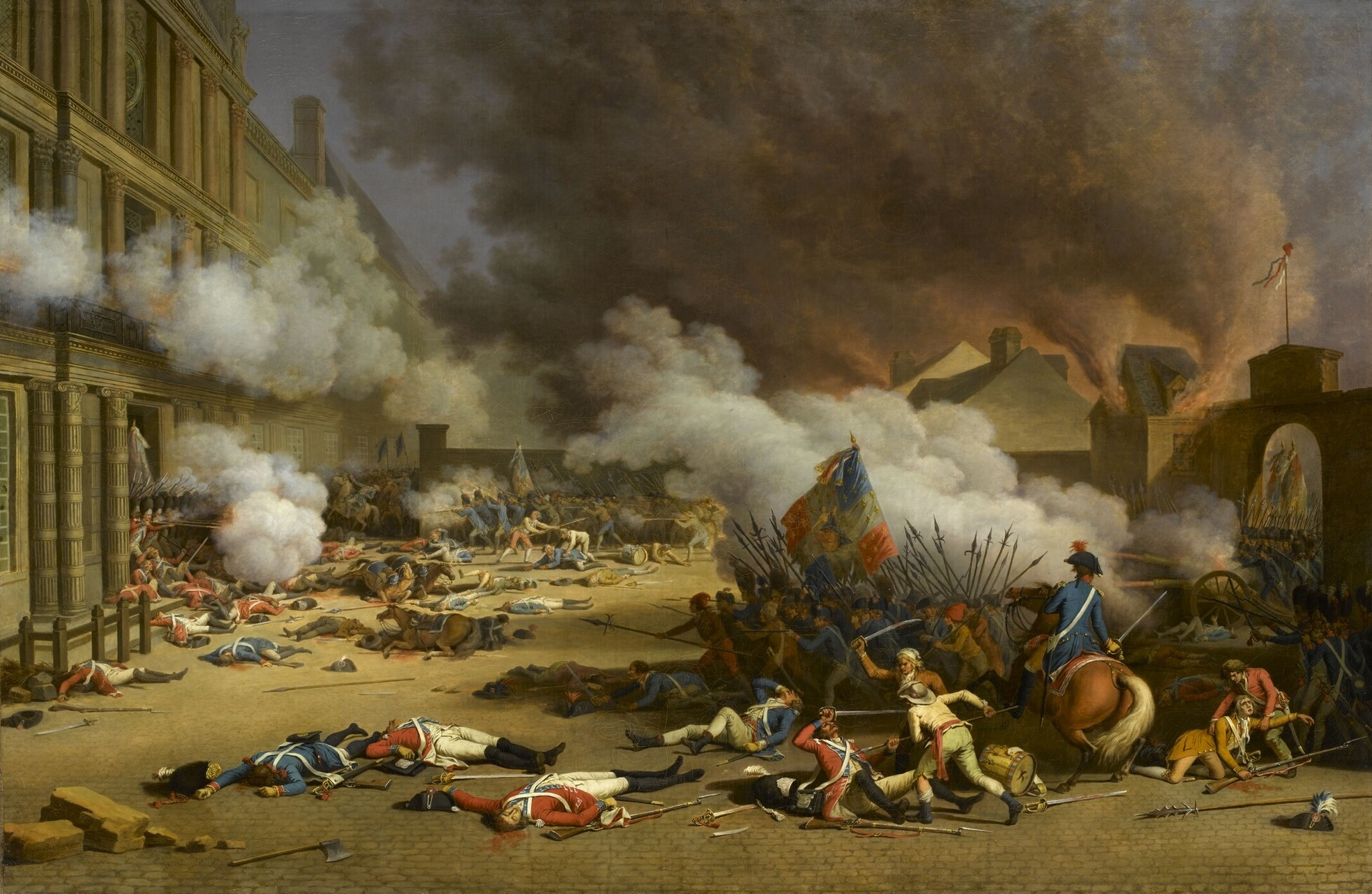
Jean Duplessis-Bertaux's painting, Storming of the Tuileries on 10. Aug. 1792 during the French Revolution (1793).

In the constellation of thinkers discussed by Abensour, Louis Antoine de Saint-Just occupies a pivotal place. Abensour presented the French revolutionary as a perfect illustration of what he saw as the enigma of the French Revolution: "When we talk about Saint-Just, the enigma is all the more daunting because it's the enigma of the Revolution itself, and perhaps of all revolutions.^{[fr]}" Saint-Just's writings, speeches, and sometimes ambiguous actions encapsulated specific moments, ideas, and events of the French Revolution. On one hand, there's the desire to abolish the Ancien Régime, while on the other, a certain conservative persistence. Thus, when Abensour explores the French Revolution through the lens of Saint-Just: "It's more about questioning the strange transformation of the Revolution into supreme authority, pondering how the Revolution metamorphoses into a new absolute.^{[fr]}"

Abensour also approached the Revolution from the perspective of heroism. According to him, heroism went hand in hand with the Revolution, and can perhaps be said to be a feature of every revolution: "As for me, I considered heroism a primary datum, a constitutive dimension of the Revolution. I claim the centrality of heroism, which can be seen as the essential element of the Revolution in the strong sense of the term, meaning it is an environment in which the actors are immersed"^{[fr]}.

However, Abensour took care to distinguish the modern hero from the ancient hero; furthermore, he established a typology of modern heroism: "anti-heroic heroism," "heroism of sincerity," "heroism of mastering appearances". For Abensour, the modern revolutionary hero has tended to substitute an ethical aim for their political purpose. Consequently, the Revolution would no longer be political but ethical and, as a result, it would lose its primary goal, i.e., changing the organization of the political community. Even more concerning, according to Abensour, many revolutionary heroes wanted to use the Revolution to actually put an end to politics, considered as essentially conflictual and violent. This last aspect of heroism is especially disastrous as it aims nothing less than to deny the existence of political things and, consequently, create a space where domination can occur.

Nonetheless, Abensour still linked heroism to freedom: "The experience of the Revolution, as an experience of freedom, involved extreme peril; anyone who didn't know this knew nothing of it.^{[fr]}"

=== Rethinking utopia ===
Abensour devoted his thèse d'État to utopia in the 19th century: "Les formes de l'utopie socialiste-communiste. Essai sur le communisme critique et l'utopie (1973, two volumes never published). In it, according to Mona Ozouf, "Miguel Abensour undertakes, against a certain Marxism but with the assistance of a certain Marx, the rehabilitation of utopia.^{[fr]}" Starting with utopian socialists and a re-reading of Karl Marx, he considered utopia to be multifaceted and distinguished different periods of utopia in the 19th century:

- "utopian socialism," with leading figures such as Claude-Henri de Rouvroy de Saint-Simon, Charles Fourier, Robert Owen;
- "neo-utopianism," represented by orthodox disciples, for example, Victor Considerant in the case of Fourier;
- the "new utopian spirit" of Pierre Leroux, William Morris, Edward Bellamy, Joseph Déjacque, or Ernest Cœurderoy.

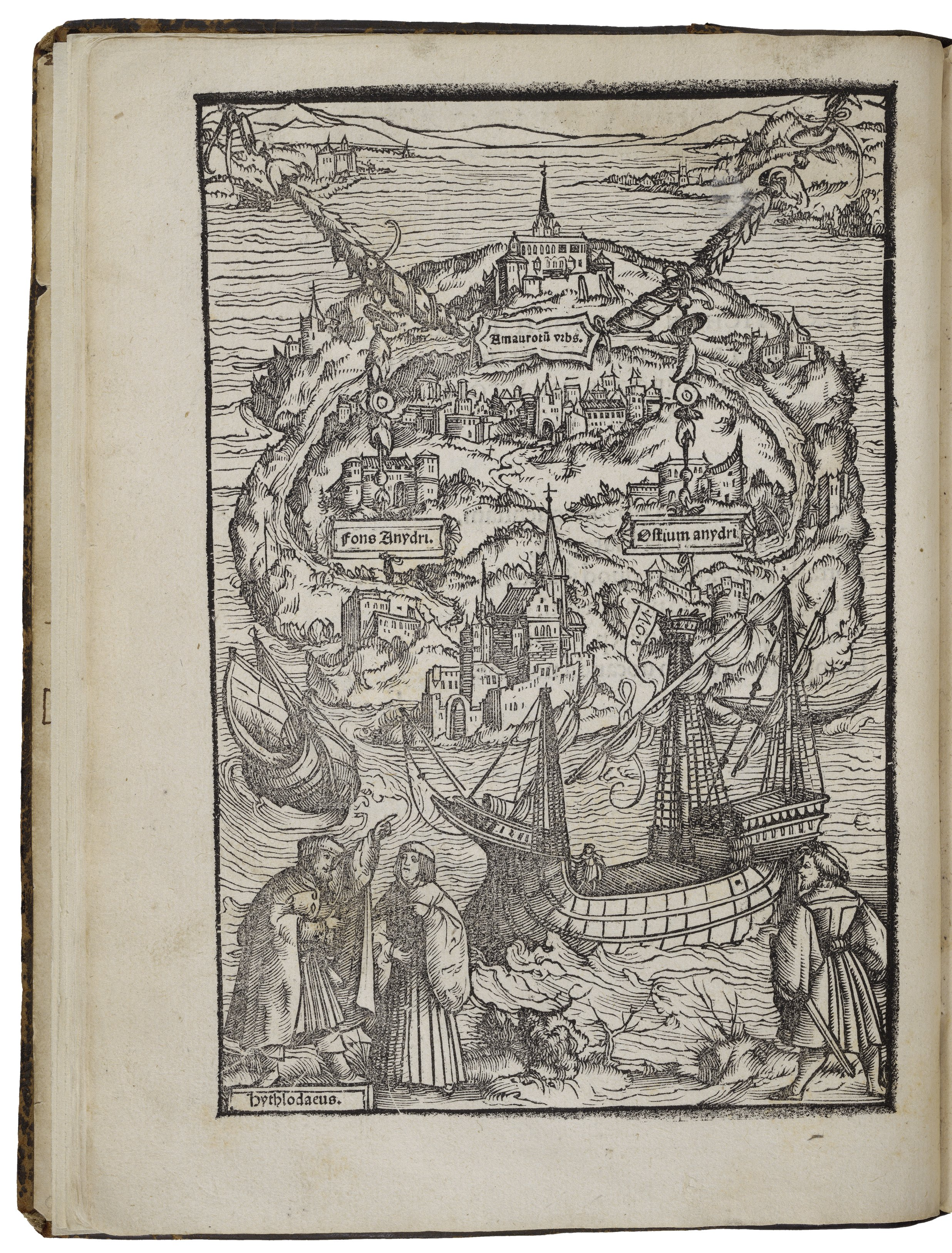
Engraving by Ambrosius Holbein of the map of the island of Thomas More's Utopia for the edition of November 1518.

This last period, this "new utopian spirit," continued into the 20th century, and took on a new form: "the particularity of the new utopian spirit is to produce not utopias but a discourse on utopia, a renewed thinking of utopia. The prominent names are Ernst Bloch, Martin Buber, critical theory (Marcuse, Adorno, Walter Benjamin), and also Emmanuel Levinas, [...]. One must also consider certain directions of surrealism, especially in André Breton's relationship with Fourier, and certain directions of the avant-garde, such as situationism or the Utopie magazine in France.^{[fr]}"

More generally, Abensour believed that "just as it's mistaken to reduce utopia to a literary genre at the risk of disconnecting it from the sociopolitical and only considering it from the perspective of literary history, it's equally absurd to read utopia as if it were a portrayal of a historical society or a travelogue of a particular existing political community.^{[fr]}" Against these reductions and interpretations of utopia, Abensour put forth a "plurality of perspectives" in his editorial collection "Critique de la politique." Among some of them, Abensour asserted that Thomas More "truly invented, with Utopia, a new rhetorical device and thus attempted an unprecedented intervention in the political field^{[fr]}"; he viewed Pierre Leroux as "a utopian activist with a long utopian practice^{[fr]}"; he believed that Karl Marx accomplished a "rescue by transference" of utopia; he considered that Walter Benjamin was "chasing down the mythology or delirium" that inhabits or ruins the utopias of the 19th century; or he detected in Emmanuel Levinas another way of thinking utopia, a "Thought of utopia under the sign of the Encounter.^{[fr]}"

On a deeper level, Abensour envisioned humans as "utopian animals": "[This expression] is an attempt to situate the human, the intricacies of the human, perhaps unsituable, unlocatable, evading assignment to a specific place and thereby gesturing towards a non-place. It's also in this sense that the human is utopian or that Levinas could speak of a utopia of the human.^{[fr]}" And he added: "Shouldn't we go further? Isn't it because the human is anarchic that it forges connections with the non-place of utopia?^{[fr]}" Finally, Abensour saw in utopia "an obstinate impetus towards freedom and justice, which, despite all failures, all denials, all defeats, is reborn in history, resurfaces, which, even in the darkest of catastrophes, makes itself heard, resists, as if the catastrophe itself gives rise to a new utopian summoning.^{[fr]}"

=== Totalitarianism: an existential threat for politics ===
Abensour was deeply concerned by the emergence of totalitarianism, by these attempts to put an end to the political, especially the Nazi regime and the Soviet regime.

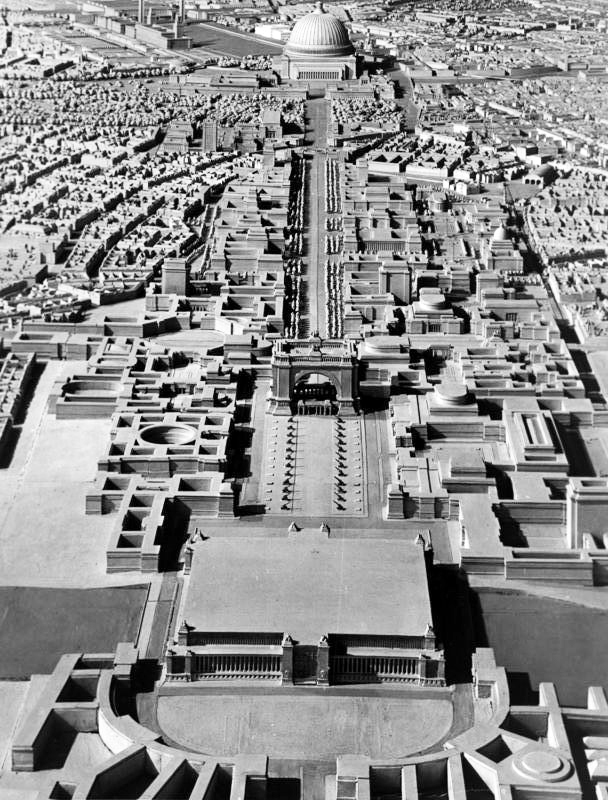
Albert Speer's plan for building a new capital, "Germania," for Nazi Germany at the demand of Adolf Hitler.

Abensour believed that totalitarianism is a complete novelty in socio-historical terms and a pivotal fact of the 20th century: "A double novelty, one might say: totalitarianism is the new element of our century, and as such, it is its 'core' (Hannah Arendt); in the history of domination, it represents a radically new form in that it aims to do nothing less than erase the political condition of human beings.^{[fr]}" Thus, for Abensour, totalitarianism is a form of "unprecedented, incomparable domination, and due to its incommensurable nature, it is irreducible to other forms of domination that have appeared in history, whether despotism, tyranny, or fascism, as there are fascisms that are not necessarily totalitarian.^{[fr]}"

Furthermore, according to Abensour, another characteristic of totalitarianism is the way it generates apoliticism. Totalitarianism shouldn't be understood as an "excess of politics," but rather as the "destruction of politics" as it directly attacks the very conditions of possibility of politics.

Abensour's examination of Albert Speer, a Nazi architect, perfectly illustrates the irreparable wound caused by totalitarianism to politics. Abensour contends that all architecture (whether it is a house, a building, a private or institutional structure, a square, or even urban planning, etc.) varies according to political regimes and ways of instituting politics. In the case of totalitarianism: "Architecture, as a constitutive element of a totalitarian regime—where its arché, its command, unfolds—establishes a space that is neither public nor political .^{[fr]}" The monuments designed and created by Albert Speer embodied this negation of politics. Moreover, they aimed to unite the German people indivisibly: "Nazi monumentality, both the gigantism of the masses (the 'human walls') and the gigantism of the buildings, instead of creating the 'public,' produces the massive and the 'compact,' seeking absolute cohesion.^{[fr]}"

== Posterity ==
=== France ===
Firstly, Abensour bequeathed to posterity his "Critique de la politique," an editorial collection with an "astonishing catalog". In his obituary, Robert Maggiori wrote: "This collection is, one might say, his 'opus.'^{[fr]}" This judgment aligns with that of Jean Birnbaum, who, in a 2006 article dedicated to Abensour's collection, wrote: "Rarely, indeed, have intellectual vocation and editorial adventure converged so remarkably in a single path of ideas.^{[fr]}" On his part, Florent Perrier emphasized that this collection has been "one of the most important in the Francophone world in the broader field of political philosophy.^{[fr]}" Others, like Emmanuel Renault and Yves Sintomer, writing the "Introduction" of a work dedicated to Critical Theory, or like Jean-François Kervégan, questioned about the lasting impact of Habermas' introduction in French philosophy, recognized the importance of this collection for the French reception of the writings of theorists from the Frankfurt School. Louis Pinto, acknowledging Abensour's role as a mediator in the reception of Critical theory, argued that Abensour "contributed to inventing a new intellectual style in the philosophical field, a kind of 'avant-garde academism' that claimed pretensions of radical rupture distinct from those of the philosophical avant-garde of the previous generation, sometimes referred to as 'postmodern'.^{[fr]}"

Furthermore, among Abensour's works and research, two poles have particularly attracted commentary and commentators: the utopian pole and the democratic pole. Regarding the first pole, Louis Janover recalled the context of Abensour's research and work: "It is up to him, indeed, not only to have unearthed forgotten authors at a time when utopia had been banished to that undefined space known as pre-Marxism but also to have reintroduced them into the genealogy of the labor movement.^{[fr]}" In the same issue of the journal Lignes, Michèle Cohen-Halimi and Sophie Wahnich wrote: "Miguel Abensour has thus heroically become one of the greatest thinkers of utopia, one of the greatest conveyors of utopias of all times, from Thomas More to Walter Benjamin.^{[fr]}"

The democratic pole of Abensour's research and work has gathered much attention, as his idea of "insurgent democracy" aligns with certain theoretical conceptions democracy (notably those of Claude Lefort, Cornelius Castoriadis, Jacques Rancière, Ernesto Laclau, and Chantal Mouffe) now collectively referred to as "radical democracy". According to Monique Rouillé-Boireau, "in Miguel Abensour's savage or 'insurgent' democracy, the aim is to maintain the idea of pluralities within the political community, and this takes place within an agonistic framework of struggle against the State, of resistance to the State.^{[fr]}" In the same spirit, Max Blechman wrote, "In true democracy, the abstract political State is dissolved as it is reduced to the essentials: a constitutional objectification, nothing more, and it is important to emphasize, nothing less than the political moment of the overall self-determination of the entire demos.^{[fr]}" However, Abensour's "insurgent democracy" is not without its critiques. For instance, Martin Deleixhe has argued that conceiving democracy against the State, that is, opposing the entirety of the people to the institutional form of the State, implies envisioning the people as a kind of totality "whose unity is both the goal and the principle of true democracy.^{[fr]}" Similarly Audric Vitiello remarked, "One can question the concrete outcome of such a conception hostile to all institutionalization: if every institution leads to the arkhè, [...], if democracy always emerges 'against the State,' it seems difficult, if not impossible, to establish a genuinely democratic regime.^{[fr]}"

== Works ==
=== In French ===
- Instructions pour une prise d'armes. L'éternité par les astres. Hypothèse astronomique et autres textes d'Auguste Blanqui établis et présentés par Miguel Abensour et Valentin Pelosse, Paris, Tête de Feuilles, 1973; re-edited by Sens & Tonka in 2000.
- De la compacité : architecture et régimes totalitaires, Paris, Sens & Tonka, 1997.
- L'Utopie de Thomas More à Walter Benjamin, Paris, Sens & Tonka, 2000. [English translation: Utopia from Thomas More to Walter Benjamin, Minneapolis, Univocal Publishing, 2017].
- Le Procès des maîtres rêveurs, Arles, Sulliver, 2000.
- La Démocratie contre l'État : Marx et le moment machiavélien, Paris, Le Félin, 2004. [English translation: Democracy against the State: Marx and the Machiavellian Moment, Cambridge, Polity, 2011].
- Rire des lois, du magistrat et des dieux : l'impulsion Saint-just, Lyon, Horlieu, 2005.
- Hannah Arendt contre la philosophie politique ?, Paris, Sens & Tonka, 2006.
- Maximilien Rubel, pour redécouvrir Marx, in collaboration with Louis Janover, Paris, Sens & Tonka, 2008.
- Pour une philosophie politique critique, Paris, Sens & Tonka, 2009.
- L'Homme est un animal utopique / Utopiques II, Arles, Les Editions de La Nuit, 2010.
- Le Procès des maîtres rêveurs (nouvelle édition augmentée) / Utopiques I, Arles, Les Éditions de La Nuit, 2011.

=== Translated texts ===
- Abensour, Miguel. A Politics of Emancipation: The Miguel Abensour Reader. Edited by Martin Breaugh and Paul Mazzocchi. Albany: SUNY Press, 2024.
- Abensour, Miguel. Democracy Against the State: Marx and the Machiavellian Moment. Translated by Max Blechman and Martin Breaugh. Cambridge: Polity Press, 2011 [1997].
- Abensour, Miguel. "‘Savage Democracy’ and ‘Principle of Anarchy’ [1994]." Translated by Max Blechman. Philosophy & Social Criticism 28, no. 6 (2002): 703–26. https://doi.org/10.1177/019145370202800606
- Abensour, Miguel. "Utopia and Democracy [1997]." In The Weariness of Democracy: Confronting the Failure of Liberal Democracy, edited by Obed Frausto, Jason A. Powell, and Sarah Vitale, translated by Matthew Lorenzen, 27–38. London: Palgrave Macmillan, 2020.
- Abensour, Miguel. Utopia from Thomas More to Walter Benjamin. Translated by Raymond N. MacKenzie. Minneapolis: Univocal, 2017 [2000].
