= Lucien Sebag =

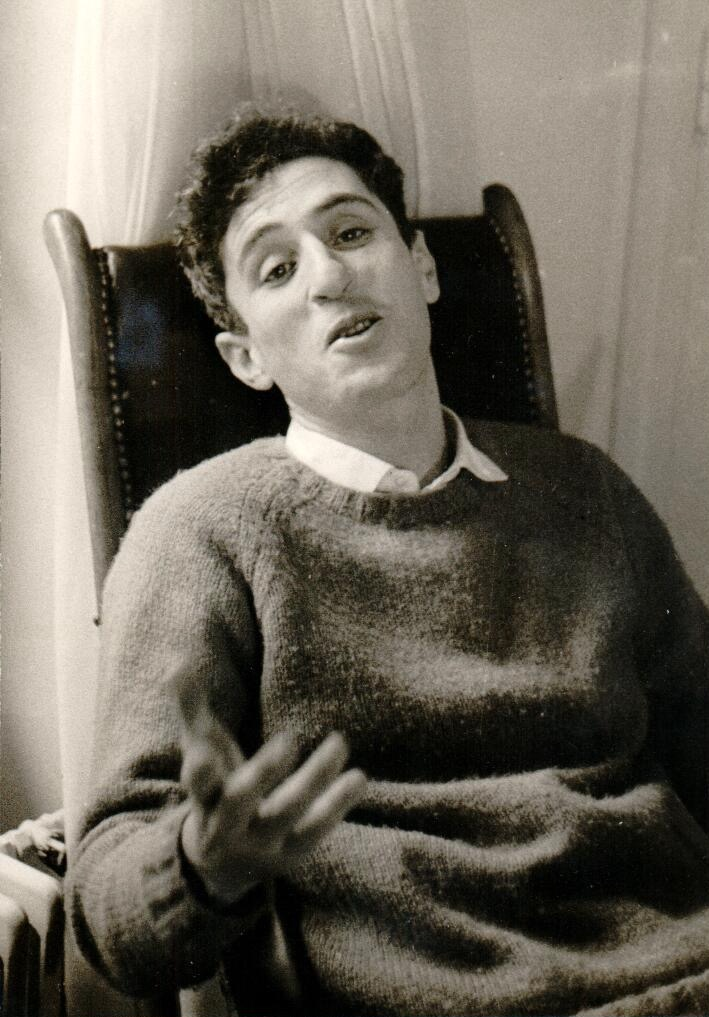
Lucien Sebag

Lucien Sebag (1933, Tunis – 1965, Paris) was a French Marxist anthropologist, a student of Claude Lévi-Strauss.

Sebag was a member of the Francophone community of Tunisian Jews. A researcher at the Centre national de la recherche scientifique, he became known for trying to reconcile structuralism and marxism in a book precisely entitled Marxisme et structuralisme (1964). Of suicidal temperament, he was followed by the psychoanalyst Jacques Lacan. In 1965, he committed suicide after falling in love with Judith, the daughter of Lacan.

== Politics and ideas ==
Initially a member of the Union of Communist Students, Sebag became an anti-Stalinist after 1956 and abandoned the French Communist Party. Along with fellow UEC member and Levi-Strauss disciple, Pierre Clastres, he was influenced by the libertarian socialist group Socialisme ou Barbarie. In François Dosse's words, for the adherents of Lévi-Strauss's Structural anthropology, "it was a matter of locating societies that had been sheltered from the unitary map of Hegelian Marxist thinking, societies that were not classified in Stalinist handbooks."

Sebag was very close to Levi-Strauss, who considered him his likely successor. Sebag's book-length study of the cosmogonic myths of the Pueblo Indians, published posthumously in 1971, was intended to further Levi Strauss' analysis of myth. Sebag was influenced by psychoanalysis; one of his papers analyzed the dreams of Baipurangi, a young woman of the Aché people. Sebag visited during periods which overlapped with Pierre Clastres' ethnography among them, but then settled among the Ayoreo of the Chaco for his own fieldwork, which he did not complete before his death.

Sebag and Clastres had "the ambition to re-read modern social philosophy in light of the teachings of Lévi-Strauss's anthropology". Sebag focused on myths and dreams, "the discourses of human fabulation".

== Publications ==
- 1964: Marxisme et structuralisme, Paris, Payot
- Sebag, Lucien (1965a). "Le chamanisme ayoréo". L'Homme (in French). 5 (1). Paris: 5–32. doi:10.3406/hom.1965.366686.
- Sebag, Lucien (1965b). "Le chamanisme ayoréo (II)". L'Homme (in French). 5 (2). Paris: 92–122. doi:10.3406/hom.1965.366715.
- 1971: L'Invention du monde chez les Indiens Pueblos, introduction by Jacqueline Bolens, Paris, Éditions Maspero, (posthumous)
- 1977: Les Ayoré du Chaco septentrional. Étude critique à partir des notes de Lucien Sebag, by Carmen Bernand-Munoz

== Bibliography ==
- Dossier, directed by Salvatore D'Onofrio, devoted to Lucien Sebag in the journal Gradhiva, Paris, fascicule no 2, 2005. Texts by Salvatore D'Onofrio, Bruno Karsenti, Pierre Clastres, Violeta and Enrique Bruchegger, etc.

=== Sources ===
- Gottraux, Philippe (1997). "Socialisme ou Barbarie": un engagement politique et intellectuel dans la France de l'après-guerre (in French). Paris: Payot Lausanne. ISBN 9782601032192.
- Moyn, Samuel (2004). "Of Savagery and Civil Society: Pierre Clastres and the Transformation of French Political Thought". Modern Intellectual History. 1: 55–80. doi:10.1017/S1479244303000076. S2CID 145643749.
- Viveiros de Castro, Eduardo (2010). "The Untimely, Again". Archeology of Violence. Ashley Lebner (translator). Los Angeles: Semiotext(e). pp. 9–52. ISBN 978-1-58435-093-4.
