= Olivier Jacquemond =

French novelist, essayist and poet (born 1980)

Olivier Jacquemond (born 1980) is a French novelist, essayist and poet.

His novel, New York Fantasy, was published by Mercure de France (part of the Éditions Gallimard publishing group) in 2009. The protagonist is a young Frenchman who comes to New York. Jacquemond says that he wrote, "a novel about 9/11 that never speaks directly about 9/11".

He is also the author of two collections of poetry ("Toit, Twin Towers" (Le Regard du texte, 2008) and "Blanchatre" (Centre Vendôme pour les Arts plastiques, 2003), and a series of essays ("The Three Secrets", published by Sens & Tonka 2004, 2006), and a novel called "Acrylique" (Sens + Tonka, 2002), also published in Italian.

The French daily Le Figaro noted that "Jacquemond's writing works because it is sincere, a style that finds the right distance between melancholy and lucidity."

Jacquemond has a doctorate in philosophy from the University of Paris (L'Université Paris 7) on the subject of friendship and was a visiting researcher at Columbia University in New York. He currently writes and teaches in Paris.
