= Hubert Tonka =

French sociologist and urban planner

- Born: 1943 (age 82–83)
- Occupation: Sociologist
- Known for: Utopie magazine

Hubert Tonka (born 1943) is a French sociologist and urban planner who edited the Utopie magazine, and was one of the leaders of the Utopie movement in the late 1960s and early 1970s.

== Career ==
For family reasons, Tonka had to start work at a very young age. In Paris around 1960, he was taking night classes for a diploma in urban planning while working in the day, where he met other members of what would become the Utopie group. He worked as a plasterer during the day. He became the assistant of Henri Lefebvre, who was a professor at the University of Paris's institute of urban planning. He was an aesthete and a refined typographer. By the end of 1966, he was a member of the editorial committee of Melp!, the École Nationale Supérieure des Beaux-Arts student association's review, along with Jacques Barda, Roland Castro, Pierre Granveaud and Antoine Grumbach. Melp! helped to articulate the dissatisfaction of students in the lead-up to the protests of 1968. Tonka was co-founder of the Vincennes department of urbanism.

The Utopie group originated from a meeting at Lefebvre's house in 1966. It included the architects Jean Aubert, Jean-Paul Jungmann and Antoine Stinco, the landscape architect Isabelle Auricoste (his wife) and the sociologists Jean Baudrillard, René Lourau and Catherine Cot. Utopie, review de sociologie de l'urbain first appeared in May 1967, with Tonka as managing editor. Tonka created L'Imprimerie Quotidienne, which printed the magazine. Tonka edited and promoted collections of Baudrillard's essays, helping to draw the attention of the public to his views, which were at first Marxist but later moved towards the centre.

Tonka became a Director at the French Institute of Architecture (1987) and a professor of architecture and contemporary art in Bordeaux and Angers (1994). In the 1990s, Tonka and singer, songwriter and author Jeanne-Marie Sens founded the publishing house Sens & Tonka. Tonka and Sens co-authored and published several books on architecture.

== Views ==
Tonka gave life to the Pneumatic concepts of the Utopie group, which advocated ephemeral, inflatable structures. Tonka held extreme left opinions, close to the anarchists, that could be traced back to Rosa Luxemburg and Mikhail Bakunin. Talking of the intellectual roots of the Utopie group, Tonka said:

I have a whole culture which comes from Batavian Marxism, that is to say Anton Pannekoek and Herman Gorter, and it has nothing to do with French Marxism. I discovered this culture in working in the Institute of Social History in Amsterdam... I discovered "secrets" from Lefebvre, who did not want to widen that membership ... there was also Archigram, there was also the Situs [situationists], and then there was everything that was around and that we saw: there was Arguments, Socialisme ou Barbarie...

In a 1971 interview, Tonka said, "To imagine ... that it is possible to act politically through urbanism, architecture, and the detournement of either is a dream." He believed that only a revolution could change society, and this could only happen in spite of architecture, which is by definition repressive.

== Selected bibliography ==
- Jeanne-Marie Sens; Dominique Perrault; Hubert Tonka; Georges Fessy (1991). L'Hôtel industriel Berlier, Paris 13e arrondissement, France, de Dominique Perrault, architecte. Pandora. p. 56.
- Jeanne-Marie Sens; Massimiliano Fuksas; Hubert Tonka; Doriana O. Mandrelli (1991). Là & ailleurs: Massimiliano Fuksas : vingt-cinq années d'architecture en Italie, en France, et en Allemagne. Pandora. p. 104.
- Jeanne-Marie Sens; Hubert Tonka; Massimiliano Fuksas; Doriana O. Mandrelli (1992). Locus & Beyond: Massimiliano Fuksas : Twenty-five Years of Architecture in Italy, France, and Germany. Pandora Editions. p. 104. ISBN 9782742100248.
- Hubert Tonka; Jean Nouvel; Sens, Jeanne-Marie Sens (1994). "Le bateau ivre" de Jean Nouvel: immeuble Cartier, 261 boulevard Raspail à Paris. Sens & Tonka. p. 95. ISBN 9782910170547.
- Hubert Tonka (1994). Une maison particulière à Floirac (Gironde) de Anne Lacaton & Jean-Philippe Vassal, architectes. Sens & Tonka. p. 44. ISBN 2910170152.
- Hubert Tonka; Rudy Ricciotti; Jeanne-Marie Sens (1995). "Rouge & noir": le stadium à Vitrolles de Rudy Ricciotti, architecte. Sens & Tonka. p. 70. ISBN 9782910170127.
- Jeanne-Marie Sens; Hubert Tonka (1997). Les ateliers du parc: école d'architecture de Normandie à Rouen de Patrice Mottini, architecte. Sens & Tonka. p. 70. ISBN 9782910170264.
- Brigitte David; Jeanne-Marie Sens; Hubert Tonka; Dominique Perrault (2002). Dominique Perrault: morceaux choisis : exposition itinérante, 2002. Sens & Tonka. p. 141.
