= Society Against the State =

1974 book by Pierre Clastres

- Author: Pierre Clastres
- Subject: Anthropology
- Published: 1974
- English publication date: 1977 (Urizen Books)

Society Against the State (French: La Société contre l'État) is a 1974 ethnography of power relations in South American rainforest native cultures written by French anthropologist Pierre Clastres and best known for its thesis that tribal societies reject the centralization of coercive power. It is considered Clastres' major work for introducing the concept of "Society against the State". In it, Clastres challenged the idea that all cultures evolve through Westernization to adopt coercive leadership, seeing this as a popular, ethnocentric myth.

== Contents and publication ==
La Société contre l'État. Recherches d'anthropologie politique was first published by Les Éditions de Minuit in 1974. When it was first translated by Urizen Books in 1977 as Society Against the State: The Leader as Servant and the Human Uses of Power Among the Indians of the Americas, however, it did not receive major attention. In 1989, Zone Books republished it as Society Against the State: Essays in Political Anthropology.

It is a collection of eleven essays: "Copernicus and the Savages", "Exchange and Power: Philosophy of the Indian Chieftainship", "Independence and Exogamy", "Elements of Amerindian Demography", "The Bow and the Basket", "What Makes Indians Laugh", "The Duty to Speak", "Prophets in the Jungle", "Of the One Without the Many", "Of Torture in Primitive Societies", and the title article "Society Against the State". "Exchange and Power" was originally published in the journal L'Homme in 1962. In the same journal were published "Independence and Exogamy" in 1963, "The Bow and the Basket" in 1966, "Elements of Amerindian Demography" and "Of Torture in Primitive Societies" in 1973. "What Makes Indians Laugh" was originally published in Les Temps modernes in 1967, and "Copernicus and the Savages" was published in Critique in 1969. "Prophets in the Jungle" and "Of the One Without the Many" were both published in L'Éphémère in 1969 and 1972 respectively. In 1973, "The Duty to Speak" was released on Nouvelle Revue de Psychanalyse.

== See also ==
- Tristes Tropiques – 1955 memoir by Claude Lévi-Strauss
- Europe and the People Without History – 1982 book by Eric Wolf
- Seeing Like a State – Non-fiction book by James C. Scott
- The Art of Not Being Governed – 2009 book by James C. Scott
