= Jeanne-Marie Sens =

- Born: December 8, 1937 (age 88); Paris, France
- Occupations: Singer; songwriter; author; editor
- Years active: 1972–present

Jeanne-Marie Sens (born 8 December 1937) is a French singer, songwriter, author and editor.

== Biography ==
Jeanne-Marie Sens began recording in the early 1970s, including adopting the Giani Esposito song Les Clowns in 1972, released by the Warner label the following year. Her inspiration is, at times, melancholic, poetic, and refractory in the face of an increasingly dehumanized world. In 1973, her protest song En plein cœur, in which her lyrics are set to music by Jean-Pierre Pouret, achieved success and notoriety. The following year brought her another hit with the prescient and sad portrait of a child cooped up in the city: L’Enfant du 92e, for which she co-wrote the lyrics with Lowery, set to the music of Belgian singer-interpreter Pierre Rapsat.

Jeanne-Marie Sens gives the impression that she prefers to live in a world of imagination and fantasy, which is more beautiful than reality, and the many records she aimed at a child audience tend to confirm this. A song from an album of children's songs, Chansons pour de vrai, Volume 2 (1977), brought her the most significant popular success: Tant et tant de temps (So many times), with music composed by Jean-Pierre Castelain. From then on, she worked almost exclusively with this composer. Despite their successful and talented association, however, her popularity declined.

In 1981, she signed a plea for acceptance of homosexuality, Il a la tête d’un poète, and she incorporated the petition created that year by Jean-Pierre Castelain for the coming presidential elections, Je donnerai ma voix with a text by Maxime Piolot. After that, she ceased making albums. Her last two 45s have the last beautiful works of the Sens-Castelain partnership: Au jardin un dimanche (1983) and Jalousie and Donne-moi ton sourire (1984).

In the early 1990s, she and Hubert Tonka co-founded the Sens & Tonka publishing house.

== Partial discography ==
45 Recordings

- Éditions Gamma référence: CED 22011, 1972.

"Les Clowns"
Lyrics and music: Giani Esposito
"L'Hautil"
Lyrics: J.P. Orfino
Music: M. Bonnecarrère

- Éditions Atlantic/WEA référence: 10970, 1977.

"Tant et tant de temps"
"Quelques mots pour lui"
Lyrics: Jeanne-Marie Sens
Music: Jean-Pierre Castelain

LP 33 Albums

- "Chansons pour de vrai, vol.1."

Editions: Warner/Atlantic référence: 50099B distribution Wea/Filipachi music. 1974.
Lyrics: Jeanne-Marie Sens
Music: Jean-Pierre Castelain
Produced by Jean Pierre Orfino.

- "Chansons pour de vrai, vol.2."

Editions Warner/Atlantic référence: 50416 distribution Wea/Filipachi music. 1977.
Lyrics: Jeanne-Marie Sens
Music: Jean-Pierre Castelain
Produced by Jean Pierre Orfino.

- "Chansons pour de vrai, vol.3."

Editions Warner/Atlantic référence: 50543SE distribution Wea/Filipachi music. 1978.
Lyrics: Jeanne-Marie Sens
Music: Jean-Pierre Castelain
Produced by Jean Pierre Orfino.

Compilation

- Les Plus belles chansons de Jeanne-Marie Sens (1 CD Warner)

== Bibliography ==
Essays

- Locus & Beyond, Massimiliano Fuksas : Twenty-five years of architecture in Italy, France and Germany, Éditions Pandora, 1992, ISBN 2742100245
- With Jean-Loup Sieff, Les Mots tout court, Éditions Sens & Tonka, Paris, 1994, ISBN 2910170063
- With Hubert Tonka, Le Bateau Ivre de Jean Nouvel, Éditions Sens & Tonka, Paris, 1994, ISBN 2910170098
- Trait d'union, Éditions Sens & Tonka, Paris, 1997, ISBN 2910170314
- Le Roman de dix jours, Éditions Sens & Tonka, Paris, 1997, ISBN 291017042X
- Bateau ivre, maison particulière, rouge et noire, Éditions Sens & Tonka, Paris, 1997, ISBN 2910170543
- Les Murs de Rome, le Trastevere, Éditions Sens & Tonka, Paris, 1999, ISBN 2845340109
- Que je sais d'elle, Éditions Sens & Tonka, Paris, 2000, ISBN 284534001X
- Opus cul : dix petites pièces en forme de figue, Éditions Sens & Tonka, Paris, 2002, ISBN 284534032X
- With Hubert Tonka, Les Simagrées de l'art urbain ou Comment ne pas meubler la ville comme on décore un salon, Éditions Sens & Tonka, Paris, 2002, ISBN 2910170225

Anthologies

- With Hubert Tonka (Collectif), X : Cent auteurs pour un anniversaire : Dix ans donc ! (2 volumes), Éditions Sens & Tonka, Paris, 2005, ISBN 2845341180

Novels

- Commencer quelque chose un lundi de novembre, Éditions Sens & Tonka, Paris, 2002, ISBN 2845340516
- La Ligne contrainte, Éditions Sens & Tonka, Paris, 2005, ISBN 284534127X

Other

- La Mouche sous un verre, Éditions Sens & Tonka, Paris,1994, ISBN 2910170136
- Effets indésirables, Éditions Sens & Tonka, Paris, 2003, ISBN 2845340656
- Vive moi !!, Éditions Sens & Tonka, Paris, 2004, ISBN 2845340842
