= Jean-Marie Apostolidès =

French writer (1943–2023)

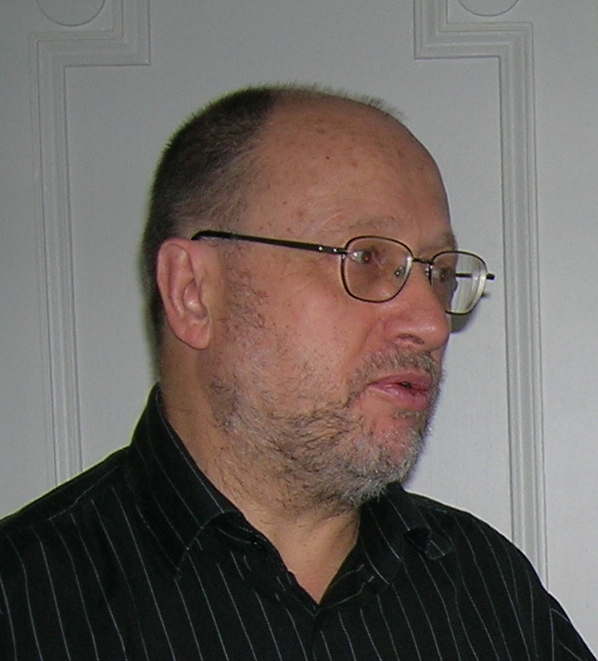
- Born: 27 November 1943; Saint-Bonnet-Tronçais, German-occupied France
- Died: 22 March 2023 (aged 79)
- Occupations: Novelist; essayist; playwright; theater director; professor
- Writing career
- Period: 1968–2023
- Notable works: Cyrano: Qui fut tout et qui ne fut rien, Héroïsme et victimisation, Les Métamorphoses et Tintin, L’Audience
- Website: fsi.stanford.edu/people/jeanmarie_apostolidès/

Jean-Marie Apostolidès (French: [apɔstɔlidɛs]; 27 November 1943 – 22 March 2023) was a French novelist, essayist, playwright, theatre director, and university professor.

== Biography ==
Apostolidès was born during World War II in the village of Saint-Bonnet-Tronçais in Auvergne. His grandfather, Evangel Apostolidès, was a Greek doctor from Asia Minor. After his studies in France, Evangel did not return home because of the rise to power of Mustafa Kemal. The childhood of Jean-Marie Apostolidès was profoundly marked by religion and its dogma; when his father Paul found out his parents had lived together without being married, he was horrified, and decided to "pay for their sins" by becoming a fervent Catholic. His work is marked by the themes of maintaining order through religion and implacable desire for social promotion.

Apostolidès grew up in Troyes, a traditional and bourgeois French town. His autobiographical novel, L’Audience, recounts his upbringing in this provincial city and paints a memorable picture of French life in the 1950s-1960s. This work centers on the author's life-altering encounter with Pope Pius XII, a “minor episode” that led him to abandon religion and devote himself to theater.

Following his “first vocation,” Apostolidès studied theater in Paris with Tania Balachova, then moved on to the study of psychology and the social sciences, obtaining a master in psychology in Nanterre, in 1968. He then moved to Canada (Toronto, then Montreal) where he taught psychology. In 1972 his first play "Bobby Boom" was directed by Olivier Reichenbach, set design by Guy Neveu, at the Théâtre du Gèsu in Montreal. In 1972 he returned to France and undertook a doctorate in sociology with Jean Duvignaud as director. During this period, while teaching at the university of Tours, Apostolidès founded a production company and directed short films with Bertrand Renaudineau. He defended his thesis and obtained his doctorat d’état in literature and the social sciences in 1977. From 1981 to 1982, Apostolidès worked with Jean Gascon, French-Canadian theater director, on adapting Oedipus Rex for the National Arts Centre in Ottawa.

Apostolidès taught in the United States from 1979, first at Stanford University (1979–1981), then at Harvard (1981–1987). In 1987 he returned to Stanford where he was the William H. Bonsall Professor of French. He taught literature and drama.

Apostolidès was the theorist of iconomy, a new field of study of images and of their effects on people.

Apostolidès died in California, on 22 March 2023, at the age of 79.

== Oeuvre ==
Apostolidès’ oeuvre focuses on theater and social history. The author draws on his knowledge of psychoanalysis, anthropology, sociology, and literature aiming to “tap into what cannot be discerned by social actors.” His first two books – Le Roi-Machine (1981), Le Prince sacrifié (1985) – deal with spectacle and court pageantry under the reign of Louis XIV. Another work in line with Le Roi-Machine is his essay Cyrano. Qui fut tout et qui ne fut rien, a literary and political analysis of Edmond Rostand's 1897 play Cyrano de Bergerac.

Apostolidès wrote a number of plays, which have been staged in France, Canada, and the United States. Among his theatrical works are: Bobby Boom (1972), La Nauf des fous (1980 and 1988) and Il faut construire l'hacienda (2006). As a theater director, he developed the approach of mise-en-tableaux, a method of mise en scène intended to enhance the spectators’ emotional involvement with the action presented on stage.

Apostolidès was a well-known expert on The Adventures of Tintin, a subject on which he published extensively – from Les Métamorphoses et Tintin in 1984, to L’Archipel Tintin in collaboration with Benoît Peeters, to Tintin et le mythe du surenfant, to one of his last works entitled Dans la peau de Tintin (2010). In this essay, he studied Hergé's psychology, undertaking an in-depth analysis of elements touched upon in his earlier works (Les Métamorphoses et Tintin; Tintin et le mythe du surenfant).

His interest in avant-garde movements, i.e. the Situationist International and the Lettrist International, as well as in the personalities who founded them, lead to the publication of the essay Les Tombeaux de Guy Debord and the play Il faut construire l’hacienda. Apostolidès also authored multiple studies and collective editions on the avant-garde: in collaboration with Boris Donné, a biography of Ivan Chtcheglov, Ivan Chtcheglov, profil perdu; an edition of Chtcheglov texts, Écrits retrouvés; and three books of Patrick Straram – Les bouteilles se couchent, La veuve blanche et noire un peu détournée, Lettre à Guy Debord.

Apostolidès translated into French the manifestos of terrorist Ted Kaczynski, known as the Unabomber: Le Manifeste de 1971 (1996) and L’avenir de la société industrielle (in 2009). Apostolidès also authored an essay on the Unabomber: L’Affaire Unabomber (1996).

Apostolidès considered three of his works particularly important. The first of these is his only novel to date, L’Audience, a family narrative published in 2001 and augmented in 2008. This autobiographical text is the author's most personal work because in it he shared his sufferings, incomprehensions, hopes, and loves. Through the story of one family, L’Audience covers half a century of life in provincial France. Second, Cyrano: Qui fut tout et qui ne fut rien, an essay on Edmond Rostand's play Cyrano de Bergerac, is an attempt to discover why, a hundred years after its creation, this play still fascinates so many people. Apostolidès sensed that the secret of Rostand's play was associated with the paternal figure and that the work's significance extended far beyond its literary qualities. Finally, Héroïsme et victimisation (2003), constitutes, as the subtitle notes, a “history of sensibility” in the West. In this essay, Apostolidès analyzed the events of May 1968 and their consequences on French society at the beginning of the 21st century. He showed how the longstanding culture of heroism was gradually replaced by a culture of victimization, thus leading to the birth of a new type of society. A new edition of this work appeared in 2011.

== Bibliography ==
=== Novel ===
L'audience (Exils, 2001), édition revue et complétée (Les Impressions Nouvelles, 2008.)

=== Theater ===
La Nauf des fous (Albin Michel, 1982)
Il faut construire l'hacienda (Les Impressions nouvelles, 2006).

=== Essays ===
Le Roi-machine. Spectacle et politique au temps de Louis XIV (Minuit, 1981)
Les Métamorphoses de Tintin (Seghers, 1984; Exils, 2003; Flammarion, 2006)
Le Prince sacrifié. Théâtre et politique au temps de Louis XIV (Minuit, 1985)
L'Affaire Unabomber (Le Rocher, 1996)
Les Tombeaux de Guy Debord, précédé de "Guy-Ernest en jeune libertin" (Exils, 1999; Flammarion, 2006)
Héroïsme et victimisation. Une histoire de la sensibilité. (Exils, 2003); Editions du Cerf, 2011. (ISBN 978-2-204-09469-6)
Tintin et le mythe du surenfant (Moulinsart, 2003)
Cyrano. Qui fut tout et qui ne fut rien (Les Impressions nouvelles, 2006)
Dans la peau de Tintin (Les Impressions nouvelles, 2010)
Debord: Le naufrageur (Flammarion, 2016)

=== Collective editions ===
L'Archipel Tintin, with Albert Algoud, Benoît Peeters, Pierre Sterckx et Dominique Cerbelaud (Les Impressions nouvelles, 2004)
Ivan Chtcheglov, profil perdu, with Boris Donné (Allia, 2006)
Ecrits retrouvés, on Ivan Chtcheglov, with Boris Donné (Allia, 2006)
Lettre à Guy Debord : Précédée d'une Lettre à Ivan Chtcheglov by Patrick Straram (Allia, 2006), with Boris Donné
La veuve blanche et noire un peu détournée, by Patrick Straram, with Boris Donné (Sens & Tonka, 2006)
Little Nemo, 1905-2005, un siècle de rêves, by Apostolidès, Baetens, Ciment, Fresnault-Deruelle, Groensteen, Maresca, Peeters, Samson, Smolderen, Sterckx, Tisseron et Van Lier.

=== Translation ===
Theodore Kaczynski, Le Manifeste de 1971 and L'avenir de la société industrielle with a preface. (Paris, Éditions Climats, 2009)
