= Géraldine Muhlmann =

French political journalist

- Education: École normale supérieure; Sciences Po; New York University
- Occupations: Political scientist; Political journalist; Professor, Paris 2; Member of the jury, PhiloMonaco
- Years active: 1995—
- Known for: Producing Avec philosophie podcast on France Culture
- Notable work: Pour les faits (Les Belles Lettres, 2023)

Géraldine Muhlmann is a French political scientist and political journalist. She is a former host of the France 5 program C politique (Fr) and, since 2023, produces the Avec philosophie podcast on the France Culture public radio channel.

== Education and positions ==
Muhlmann received the 1er accessit in the philosophy concours général in 1989.

Muhlmann attended the École normale supérieure in Paris, earning an Agrégation in philosophy in 1994 and one in political science in 2003, and a doctorate in political science in 2001. She also studied public service at the Sciences Po, in the class of 1995. In 1996, Muhlmann obtained a graduate degree in journalism from New York University.

== Career ==
In 1995, Muhlmann participated in the electoral campaign of Lionel Jospin in the 1995 French presidential election. In 1996, after graduating with a degree in journalism, Muhlmann began working with the American journalist Charlie Rose on the television channel PBS. Muhlmann then became an instructor at the University of Paris II Panthéon-Assas in the Center for the study of administrative science (Fr), and also at Paris-Sud University.

From 1998 to 1999, Muhlmann was a project manager in the office of Martine Aubry, who at the time was France's Minister of Labour. Muhlmann continued to work as a political commentator, with regular appearances on radio and television shows including On refait le monde (fr) on RTL, Frédéric Ferney's Le Bateau livre (fr) on France 5, Le Rendez-vous des Politiques on France Culture, and Les Matins de France Culture. In 2008 she was a host on Paris Première, including the talk show Cactus produced by Emmanuel Chain.

In 2011, Muhlmann replaced Nicolas Demorand on the France 5 politics program C politique, when Demorand was hired to manage the newspaper Libération. She remained there until 2012.

In 2014, Muhlmann joined Franz-Olivier Giesbert on Les Grandes Questions on France 5. Muhlmann has also been one of the main presenters on the France 2 news show On n'est pas couché. Since 2023, Muhlmann is the producer of the France Culture podcast Avec philosophie. She is also a member of the jury deciding three annual awards that are presented by Les Rencontres Philosophiques de Monaco, also known as PhiloMonaco.

== Works ==
- Une histoire politique du journalisme, XIXe-XXe siècles (Éditions Points, 2007) ISBN 9782757803929
- Histoire des idées politiques (PUF, 2011) ISBN 9782130586883
- Du journalisme en démocratie (Klincksieck, 2017) ISBN 9782252040904
- L'imposture du théologico-politique (Les Belles Lettres, 2022) ISBN 9782251453576

=== English-translated ===
- Political History of Journalism, trans. Jean Birrell, (Polity Press, 2008) ISBN 9780745635743
- The Theological-Political Turn: A Critique, trans. Andrew Brown, (Polity Press, 2026) ISBN 9781509567324
