= Pierre Clastres =

French anthropologist and ethnologist (1934–1977)

- Born: 17 May 1934; Paris, France
- Died: 29 July 1977 (aged 43); Gabriac, France
- Education: University of Paris
- Known for: Society Against the State; Archeology of Violence
- Scientific career
- Fields: Anthropology
- Workplaces: Centre national de la recherche scientifique (1961–1975); École pratique des hautes études (1971–1977)
- Thesis: La vie social d'une tribu nomade: les Indiens Guayaki du Paraguay (1965)

Pierre Clastres (French: [pjɛʁ klastʁ]; 17 May 1934 – 29 July 1977) was a French anthropologist, ethnographer, and ethnologist. He is best known for his contributions to the field of political anthropology, with his fieldwork among the Guayaki in Paraguay and his theory of stateless societies. He mostly researched Indigenous peoples of the Americas in which the power was not considered coercive and chieftains were powerless.

With a background in literature and philosophy, Clastres started studying anthropology with Claude Lévi-Strauss and Alfred Métraux in the 1950s. Between 1963 and 1974 he traveled five times to South America to do fieldwork among the Guaraní, the Chulupi, and the Yanomami. Clastres mostly published essays and, because of his premature death, his work was unfinished and scattered. His signature work is the essay collection Society Against the State (1974) and his bibliography also includes Chronicle of the Guayaki Indians (1972), Le Grand Parler (1974), and Archeology of Violence (1980).

== Life and career ==
Clastres was born on 17 May 1934, in Paris, France. He studied at the Sorbonne, obtaining a licence in Literature in 1957, and a Diplôme d'études supérieures spécialisées in Philosophy the following year. He began working in Anthropology after 1956 as a student of Claude Lévi-Strauss, working at the Laboratory of Social Anthropology of the French National Centre for Scientific Research during the 1960s. He was also a student of Alfred Métraux at the École pratique des hautes études (EPHE) in 1959.

Clastres's first published article was released in 1962, a year before Clastres went into an eight-month trip to a Guayaki community in Paraguay with the help of Métraux. The Guayaki's study served as base to an article for Journal de la Société des Américanistes, to his 1965 doctoral thesis in ethnology—Social Life of a Nomadic Tribe: The Guayaki Indians of Paraguay (Note: The title used is the translation by Bowman in The Routledge Dictionary of Anthropologists. Its original title is La vie social d'une tribu nomade: les Indiens Guayaki du Paraguay.)—, to "The Bow and the Basket", as well as to his first book, Chronicle of the Guayaki Indians (1972).

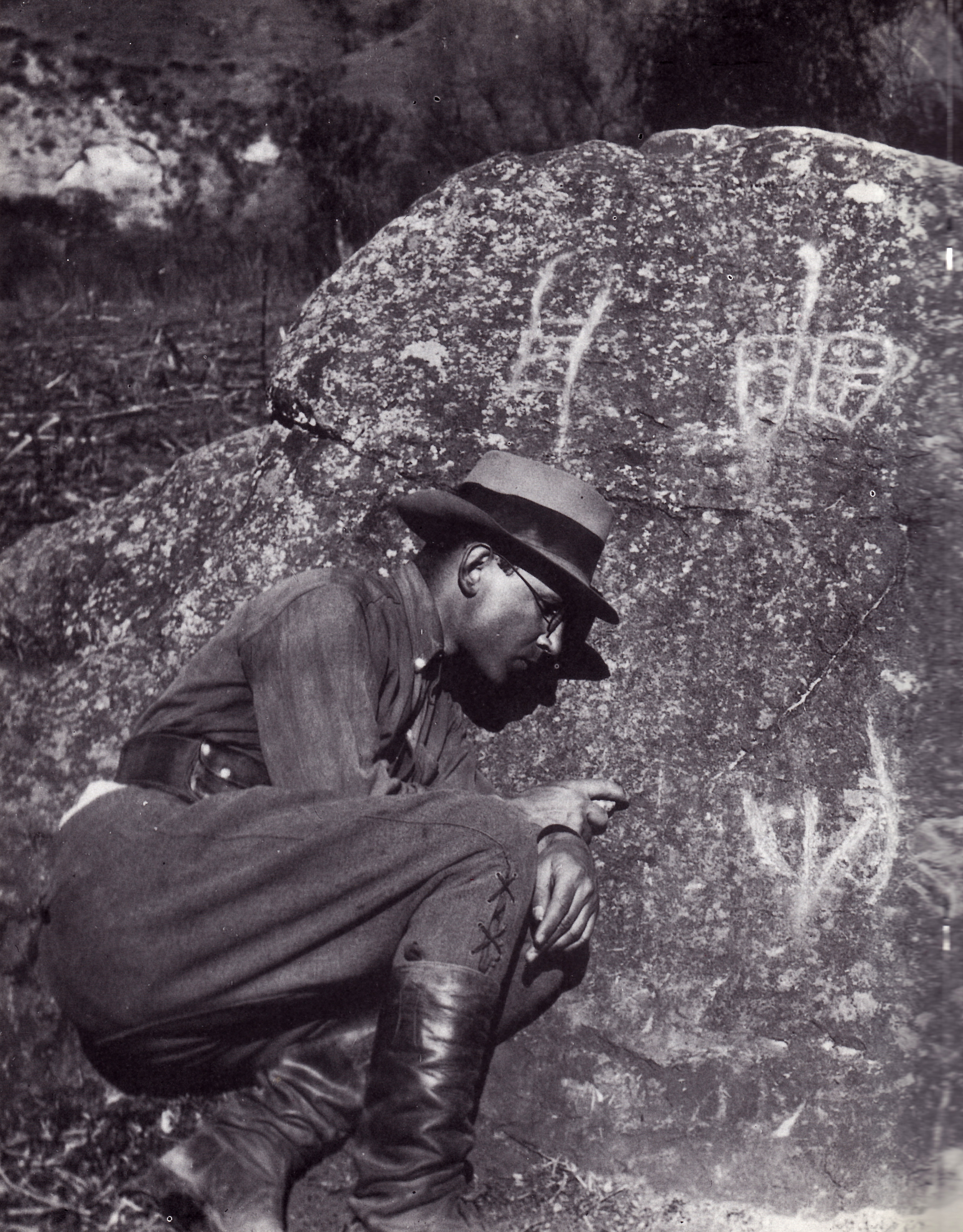
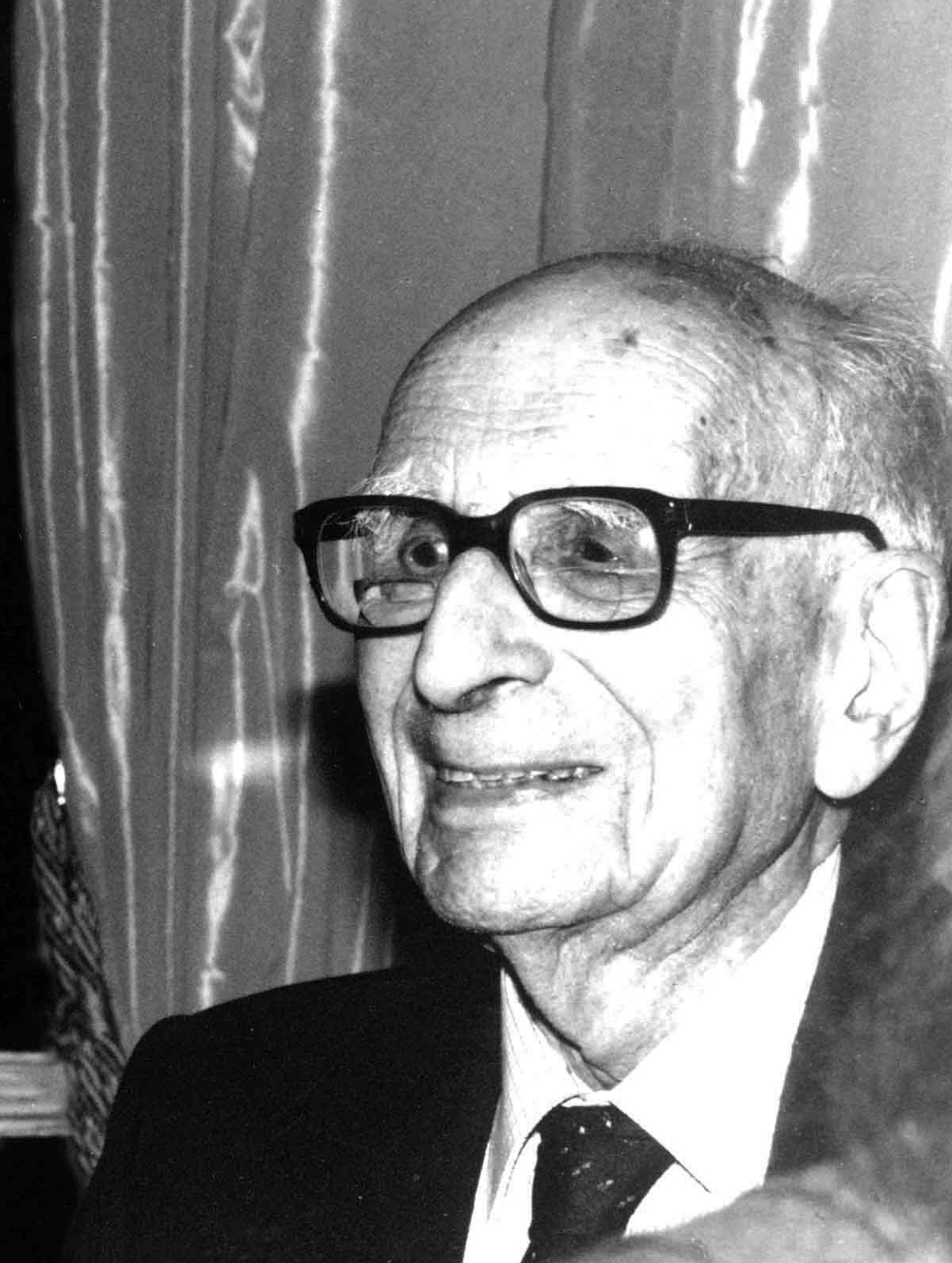
Clastres was student of the anthropologists Alfred Métraux (left) and Claude Lévi-Strauss (right), whose ideas influenced him.

In 1965 Clastres returned to Paraguay and he met the Guaraní—this encounter led him to write Le Grand Parler (1974). In 1966 and 1968 Clastres went into expeditions to the Gran Chaco region of Paraguay, where he studied groups of Chulupi people. This experience was used to produce the essays What Makes Indians Laugh and Sorrows of the Savage Warrior. In his fourth expedition Clastres travelled to Venezuela, where he observed the Yanomami people from 1970 to 1971, and wrote The Last Frontier. He briefly visited the Guaraní which migrated from Paraguay to Brazil in his last expedition in 1974.

In 1971 he became lecturer at the fifth section of the EPHE, and was promoted to director of studies of the religion and societies of South American Indigenous peoples in October 1975. That same year he left his office as researcher of the Laboratory of Social Anthropology—which he occupied since 1961—after conflicts over Lévi-Strauss's theories. In 1977 he took in part in the establishment of the journal Libre alongside the former members of Socialisme ou Barbarie Miguel Abensour, Cornelius Castoriadis, Marcel Gauchet, Claude Lefort, and Maurice Luciani. Later that year, Clastres, aged 43, died in Gabriac, Lozère, on 29 July, in a car accident.

== Works ==
=== Chronicle of the Guayaki Indians ===
Clastres's first book was originally published in France by Plon in 1972 under the title Chronique des indiens Guayaki: ce que que savent les Aché, chasseurs nomades du Paraguay (Chronicle of the Guayaki Indians: The Knowledge of the Aché Hunter Nomads of Paraguay). He was interested in Guayaki because there was little research on them since Alfredo Stroessner's dictatorship forced them to live under territorial restriction and launched a pacifying campaign between 1959 and 1962. In the book, the author describes Guayaki culture with a focus on their cycle of life and their "daily struggles for survival." He describes their mores on rites of passage, marriage, hunting, warfare, and death, as well as their relation with non-Indian people and nature. In 1976 Paul Auster, then a "penniless unknown", translated the book into English but it was only published in 1998 by Zone Books. Auster translated the work because he was fascinated by Clastres's prose, which "seemed to combine a poet's temperament with a philosopher's depth of mind."

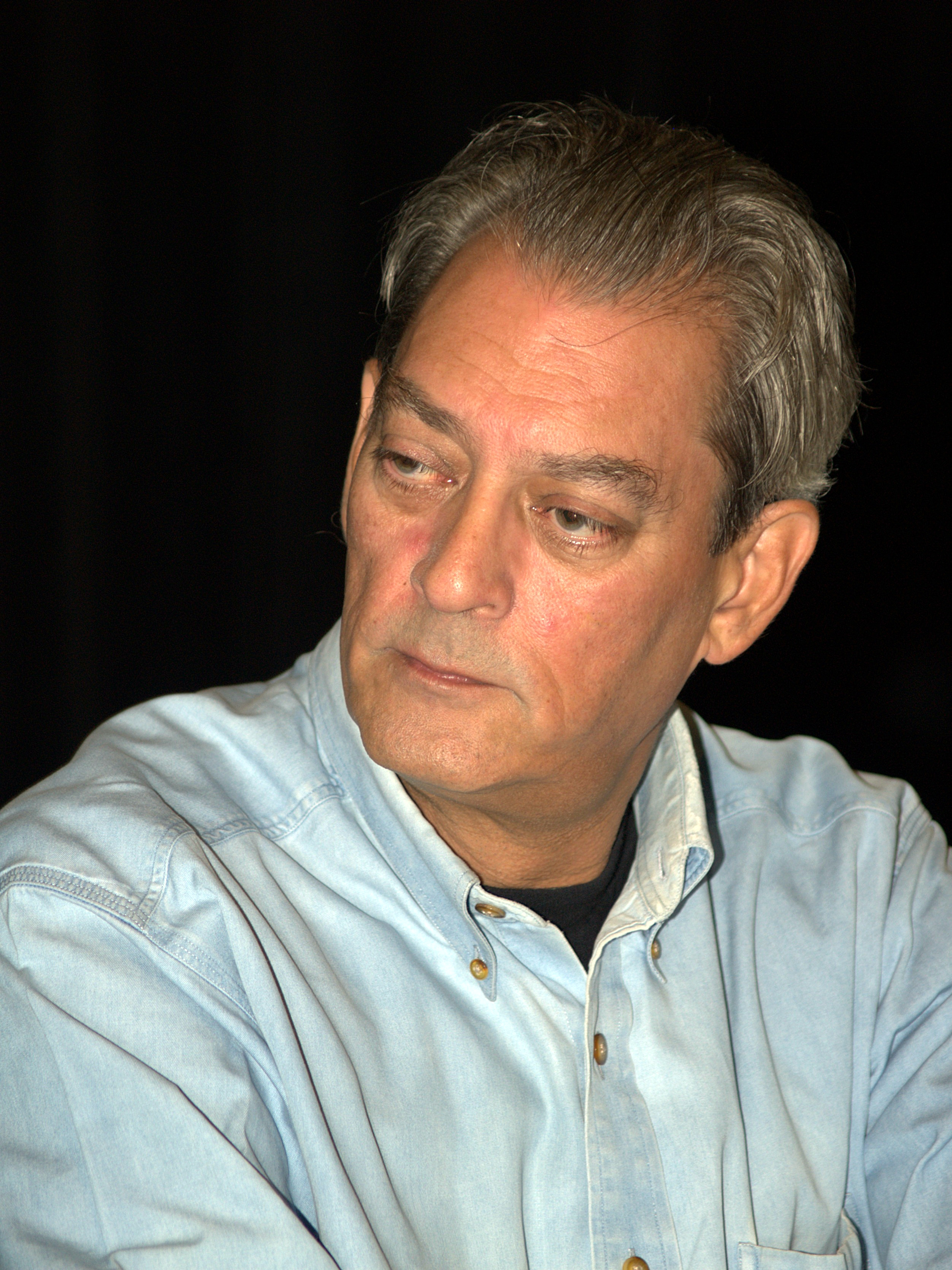
Chronicle of the Guayaki Indians's literary qualities attracted novelist Paul Auster; critics, however, qualified it as a "romantic" work.

Although its literary qualities have been what attracted Auster, the work has been criticized as "romantic". Anthropologist Clifford Geertz said Clastres had a "Rousseauian primitivism, the view that 'savages' are radically different from us, more authentic than us, morally superior to us, and need only to be protected, presumably by us, from our greed and cruelty." Bartholomew Dean, writing for the journal Anthropology Today, declared, "Clastres' ahistoricism, rhetorical romanticism, and museumification sadly obscures the ongoing challenges facing indigenous peoples like the Guayaki."

In opposition to Geertz and Dean, David Rains Wallace said it was an "unsettling" work because it "is not quite the nostalgic view of primitive life that now prevails in literary circles." Wallace asserted Clastres's "might have misinterpreted" the Guayaki's relation with nature because "he was predisposed to see stronger oppositions between culture and nature" as a Structuralist. However, he wrote "Whatever the validity ... of Clastres' interpretation of Guayaki thought, his evocation of their lost lives has great charm, an attraction that arises automatically from our civilized fascination with wild people who seem so strange at first, dodging naked through the forest, but who prove to be so much like us in feelings if not in thought and habits."

In Anthropology Today, Jon Abbink explained the historical context in which Clastres wrote the book and argued, "in presenting them as 'indigenes' with specific cultural values and identity, he has also tried to ground their presence and their historical rights". Abbink also refused the idea it had not a critical perspective; Clastres's focus on the problems Western society could bring to the Guayaki is against "the arrogant idea ... that they should be reformed in our image and respond to our models of social and economic life".

=== Society Against the State ===
Considered his major work for introducing the concept of "Society against the State", La Société contre l'État. Recherches d'anthropologie politique was first published by Les Éditions de Minuit in 1974. When it was first translated by Urizen Books in 1977 as Society Against the State: The Leader as Servant and the Human Uses of Power Among the Indians of the Americas, however, it did not receive major attention. In 1989, Zone Books republished it as Society Against the State: Essays in Political Anthropology. It is a collection of eleven essays: "Copernicus and the Savages", "Exchange and Power: Philosophy of the Indian Chieftainship", "Independence and Exogamy", "Elements of Amerindian Demography", "The Bow and the Basket", "What Makes Indians Laugh", "The Duty to Speak", "Prophets in the Jungle", "Of the One Without the Many", "Of Torture in Primitive Societies", and the title article "Society Against the State".

=== Le Grand Parler ===
In France, Le Grand Parler. Mythes et chants sacrés des Indiens Guaraní was published by Éditions du Seuil in 1974. The book was never officially translated into English; Moyn calls it The Great Speech: Myths and Sacred Chants of the Guarani Indians, while The Routledge Dictionary of Anthropologists referred to it as The Oral Treasury: Myths and Sacred Song of the Guarani Indians. Clastres had the help of Paraguayan ethnologist León Cadogan to come in contact with the Guaraní and to translate his ethnographic material. In the book, the focus was towards the "beautiful words" in the paeans they used to worship their gods.

In addition to his translation from Guarani, the exegesis Clastres offered of these texts was criticized in two ways: either he saw subtlety where there was none, or he missed the true political philosophy of the karai (i.e., the prophets). In his analysis of the Great Speech, the Paraguayan anthropologist Ruiz Zubizarreta, a specialist in Guarani culture, highlights the place of this book within Pierre Clastres’ theoretical framework. He explains that it is the prophetic speech of the pre-Columbian era that drew the French anthropologist’s interest. In Society Against the State, Clastres states that in the 15th century, there were, on one side, the chiefs, and on the other, and opposed to them, the prophets — and that during this pre-Columbian period, 'the prophetic machine functioned perfectly.' However, the Paraguayan anthropologist points out that Clastres may have stripped the Guarani texts of all colonial and Christian influences in order to align them with his theories.

=== Archeology of Violence ===
Recherches d'anthropologie politique, posthumously published in France by Éditions du Seuil in 1980, was first translated into English by Semiotext(e) in 1994 as Archeology of Violence. The book collects the chapters of a work Clastres started writing before his death—the two last chapters of Archeology of Violence—and Clastres's last essays. Ranging from articles about ethnocide and shamanism to "primitive" power, economy and war, it is composed by twelve essays: "The Last Frontier", "Savage Ethnography", "The Highpoint of the Cruise", "Of Ethnocide", "Myths and Rites of South American Indians", "Power in Primitive Societies", "Freedom, Misfortune, the Unnameable", "Primitive Economy", "The Return to Enlightenment", "Marxists and Their Anthropology", "Archeology of Violence: War in Primitive Societies", and "Sorrows of the Savage Warrior".

"The Last Frontier" and "The Highpoint of the Cruise" were originally published in Les Temps modernes in 1971. "Savage Ethnography" and "Of Ethnocide" were published in L'Homme in 1969 and 1974 respectively. For Flammarion's Dictionnaire des mythologies et des religions (1981), Clastres wrote "Myths and Rites of South American Indians". Interrogations was the journal in which "Power in Primitive Societies" was released in 1976. "Freedom, Misfortune, the Unnameable" was written for a 1976 scholarly edition of Étienne de La Boétie's Discourse on Voluntary Servitude. "Primitive Economy" was the title given to the preface Clastres wrote for the French edition of Marshall Sahlins's Stone Age Economics. "The Return to Enlightenment" was released in Revue Française de Science politique in 1977. Both "Archeology of Violence: War in Primitive Societies" and "Sorrows of the Savage Warrior" were published in Libre in 1977, and "Marxists and Their Anthropology" was published on the same journal in 1978.

== Thought ==
=== Structuralism, Marxism, and anarchism ===
Initially a member of the Union of Communist Students, Clastres became disenchanted with Communism after the raising of Stalinism and abandoned the French Communist Party after 1956, seeking for a new point of view. Along with fellow UEC member and Levi-Strauss disciple, Lucien Sebag, he was influenced by the libertarian socialist group Socialisme ou Barbarie. In François Dosse's words, for Clastres and other adherents of Lévi-Strauss's Structural anthropology, "it was a matter of locating societies that had been sheltered from the unitary map of Hegelian Marxist thinking, societies that were not classified in Stalinist handbooks." Although initially adept of Structuralism, Abensour wrote that "Clastres is neither Structuralist, nor Marxist." Similarly, Eduardo Viveiros de Castro declared Society Against the State and Archeology of Violence can be considered "the chapters of a virtual book that could be named Neither Marxism nor Structuralism." For Clastres, in Viveiros de Castro's words, "both privileged economic rationality and suppressed political intentionality."

According to Samuel Moyn, Clastres's first article, Exchange and Power, "exhibited a vestigial structuralism" that he would abandon on subsequent essays. On "Marxists and Their Anthropology" Clastres criticised structuralist perspective on myth and kinship because it ignores their place of production—the society. He said that, for structuralism, kinship only has the function to prohibit incest. "This function of kinship explains that men are not animals, [but] does not explain how primitive man is a particular man." It neglects that "kinship ties fulfill a determined function, inherent in primitive society as such, that is, an undivided society made up of equals: kinship, society, equality, even combat." On myths, Clastres said, "The rite is the religious mediation between myth and society: but, for structuralist analysis, the difficulty stems from the fact that rites do not reflect upon each other. It is impossible to reflect upon them. Thus, exit the rite, and with it, society."

With Structuralism's crisis in the later 1960s, Marxist anthropology became an alternative to it. Clastres, however, was critical of it because Marxism was developed on the context of capitalist societies and anthropologists were using it to analyse non-capitalist societies. On Clastres's perspective, according to Viveiros de Castro, "historical materialism was ethnocentric: it considered production the truth of society and labor the essence of the human condition." However, it is not true for primitive societies since they live in a subsistence economy, in which not only they do not have to produce an economic excess but they refuse to do it. In opposition to Marxist's economic determinism, for Clastres, politics was not superstructure; instead it was sui generis, which enabled Amerindian societies to refuse power and statehood. Clastres wrote,

When, in primitive society, the economic dynamic lends itself to definition as a distinct and autonomous domain, when the activity of production becomes alienated, accountable labor, levied by men who will enjoy the fruits of that labor, what has come to pass is that society has been divided into rulers and ruled ... Society's major division ... is the new vertical ordering of things between a base and a summit; it is the great political cleavage between those who hold the force ... and those subject to that force. The political relation of power precedes and founds the economic relation of exploitation. Alienation is political before it is economic; power precedes labor; the economic derives from the political; the emergence of the State determines the advent of classes.

— Clastres, "Society Against the State"

In refusing both Structuralism and Marxism, Clastres, in Moyn's words, "presented his own 'political anthropology' as the more plausible sequel or complement to structuralist analysis." Because of his analysis of power and the State, several commentators say Clastres posites an "anthropological anarchism" or exhibits anarchist influences.

=== On power and coercion ===
In his 1969 article "Copernicus and the Savages", Clastres reviewed J. W. Lapierre's Essai sur le fondement du pouvoir politique, in which he said primitive societies were societies without power based on Max Weber's "definition of power as the state-based monopoly on legitimate violence". Clastres, however, argued that power does not imply either coercion or violence, and proposed a "Copernican revolution" in political anthropology: "In order to escape the attraction of its native earth and attain real freedom of thought, in order to pull itself away from the facts of natural history in which it continues to flounder, reflection on power must effect a 'heliocentric' conversion."

In another essay, Exchange and Power, he argued that South American Indigenous chieftains are powerless chiefs; they are chosen on the basis of their oratorical talent. And while they have the exclusive right to be polygamous, they have to be generous and offer gifts to their people. However, it was not an exchange: they give and receive each independently; Clastres wrote, "this relationship, by denying these elements an exchange value at the group level, institutes the political sphere not only as external to the structure of the group, but further still, as negating that structure: power is contrary to the group, and the rejection of reciprocity, as the ontological dimension of society, is the rejection of society itself." Clastres then concluded that "the advent of power, such as it is, presents itself to these societies as the very means for nullifying that power." In Le Grand Parler, he argued that "the society itself, not its leader, is the real site of power" and then they can avoid the concentration of power.

=== On torture and war ===
On their struggle against the State, on keeping their society an egalitarian one, however, they use violent methods: torture and warfare. Moyn said that Clastres "reinterpret[ed] the violence in primitive society as internal and essential to its self immunization against the rise of the state" and "compare[d] it favorably to the grandiose horrors of the statist, modern world." To the first topic, he dedicated "Of Torture in Primitive Societies"; Clastres did not think on it as cruel practice and using Soviet Union penal tattoos on Anatoly Marchenko as example, Clastres affirmed: "It is proof of their admirable depth of mind that the Savages knew all that ahead of time, and took care, at the cost of a terrible cruelty, to prevent the advent of a more terrifying cruelty." Instead he argued torture in rites of passage had the function of prohibiting inequality:

The law they come to know in pain is the law of primitive society, which says to everyone: You are worth no more than anyone else; you are worth no less than anyone else. The law, inscribed on bodies, expresses primitive society's refusal to run the risk of division, the risk of a power separate from society itself, a power that would escape its control. Primitive law, cruelly taught, is a prohibition of inequality that each person will remember.

— Clastres, "Of Torture in Primitive Societies"

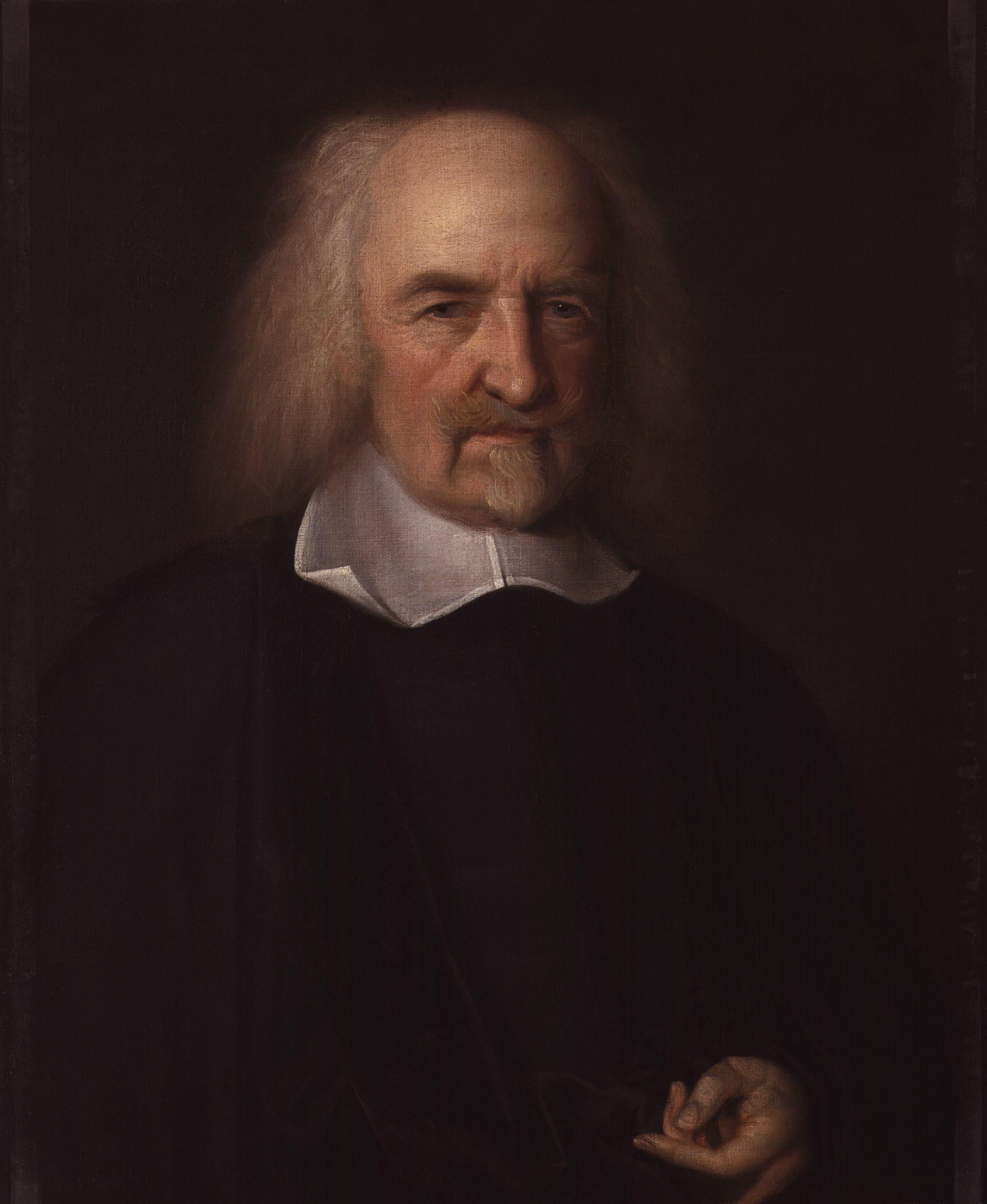
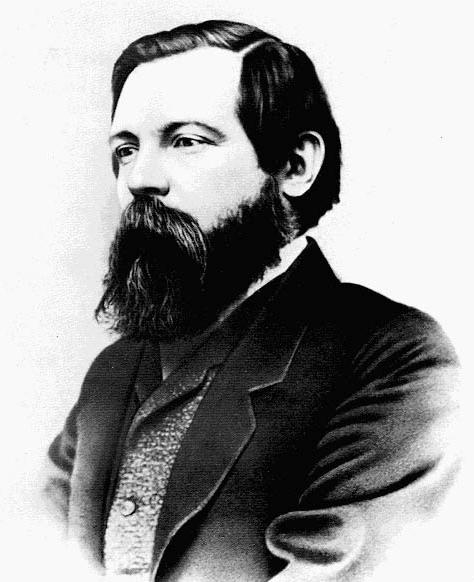
For its perspective on war, Archeology of Violence was said to be "an anti-Hobbes book" (left). However, it also criticized Engels's perspective on the origin of the State, and his idea of State as the ultimate destiny of society. It would lead it to be described as "more anti-Engels, a manifesto against the forced continuism of World History".

On a similar fashion, Clastres argued that war could not be seen as a problem but that it had a political reason. He pointed it was not a constant state of war like the Hobbesian proposition but that it occurred only between different groups. He argued that internal war was purposeful and kept the group segmented, non-hierarchized; according to Viveiros de Castro: "perpetual war was a mode of controlling both the temptation to control and the risk of being controlled. War keeps opposing the State, but the crucial difference for Clastres is that sociality is on the side of war, not of the sovereign." Clastres stated:

For [Hobbes], the social link institutes itself between men due to "a common Power to keep them all in awe:" the State is against the war. What does primitive society as a sociological space of permanent war tell us in counter-point? It repeats Hobbes's discourse by reversing it; it proclaims that the machine of dispersion functions against the machine of unification; it tells us that war is against the State.

— Clastres, "Archeology of Violence: War in Primitive Societies"

=== On the State ===
For Clastres, primitive societies possessed a "sense of democracy and taste for equality," and thus intentionally discourage the rise of a State. That is why these societies are not merely characterized as societies without a State, but societies against the State. Viveiros de Castro explained the meaning of "Society against the State" as "a modality of collective life based on the symbolic neutralization of political authority and the structural inhibition of ever-present tendencies to convert power, wealth and prestige into coercion, inequality and exploitation." By affirming it, Clastres criticised both the evolutionist and Marxist ("especially Engelsian") notion that the State would be a necessity and the ultimate destiny in all societies. For him, the State does not emerge because of the complexification of productive or political forces but it rises when a community reaches a certain number of members.

On the other hand, his vision of tribal societies without conflict was deemed "romantic" by critics such as Marcus Colchester and Samuel Moyn. Moyn wrote: "Many took Clastres's own words"—as in the affirmation that Amerindian societies "could predict the future" and avoid State—"to convict him of primitivism."

== Legacy ==
In Moyn's opinion: "Clastres's romanticized vision of society against the state not only failed to fulfill the primary need of his (but not only his) time—a theory of democratization in which society and state are complementary—but imposed an obstacle to its fulfillment." First, his arguments implied in "a kind of paralyzed mourning" because his "primitivist nostalgia" made people distant from reforms in the present. "In this way, Clastres's anti- but not yet genuinely post-Marxist perception that the state in all its forms is corrupted by a 'neo-theology of history with its fanatic continuism' prevented him from presenting a viable stance for those who are unable to escape the circumstances of Western modernity—which is to say, in a globalized world, everyone."

According to Moyn, another consequence was that it provided a base for thinkers like Marcel Gauchet, who openly do homages to Clastres's work. Clastres was also a major influence for French philosophers Gilles Deleuze and Félix Guattari's Anti-Oedipus and A Thousand Plateaus. His view that totalitarianism was a constant danger in modern societies "makes the security of freedoms against the state the only realistic achievement in a politics without illusions." On the other hand, his effect on left thinkers was that it gave rise to the belief that democracy is primarily a matter of civil society and thus prompted a dichotomy between society and the state, overshadowing the role of the state in the development of an active civil society. While Moyn considered Clastres had "an important role in the rise in contemporary theory of the importance of civil society", his theory "not only forced an excessive burden onto civil society alone as the locus of freedom; it also neutralized a theory of the state, condemned and feared in all its forms". Differently, Warren Breckman concluded Clastres's view on State helped the antitotalitarian current of 1970s French thought.

James C. Scott's The Art of Not Being Governed proposes that Zomia inhabitants were intentionally "using their culture, farming practices, egalitarian political structures, prophet-led rebellions, and even their lack of writing systems to put distance between themselves and the states that wished to engulf them". His thesis sparked some controversy and although he affirmed he made "bold claims" none of them were totally original, attributing some of them to Clastres. Scott commented on how Clastres influenced him: "The reason it was useful for me... is that he was the first person to understand that modes of subsistence are not just grades on some evolutionary scale--from hunting and gathering to swiddening, foraging, agriculture, and so on--but rather that the choice of a mode of subsistence is in part a political choice about how you want to relate to existing state systems".

The influence of Clastres on the philosophers Divya Dwivedi and Shaj Mohan in their philosophical and political writings has been noted. Dwivedi and Mohan have interpreted the political thought of M. K. Gandhi through the works of Pierre Clastres in their book Gandhi and Philosophy: On Theological Anti-politics. They propose that Gandhi's concept of non-violence requires the formation of the state as per Clastres, "We will need to make a detour through the great anarchist anthropologist himself – Pierre Clastres – in order to find the steps which will lead us unto the Gandhian temple of non-violence". Permanence of war in primitive societies holds off the formation of the state and the appearance of the concept of violence. Following Clastres they argue that it is the state that makes the distinction between good force and bad force. Dwivedi and Mohan also note that for Clastres the state is the recording apparatus of memories which does not allow any deviation from the state's version of the past. They say that new possibilities for politics are to be found behind the curtain of the state according to Clastres: "At the beginning, in the days spent without records of memory, lost behind the obscure curtain before which the state arrives, lies an epoch without functional isolations: the reign of pure polynomia which grants all possibilities with no realizations. All homologies here remain revealed as nature is pure voluptuousness without any spans to reach it."

== Selected works ==
- Chronicle of the Guayaki Indians (Chronique des indiens Guayaki), 1972
- Society Against the State (La Société contre l'État. Recherches d'anthropologie politique), 1974
- Le Grand Parler. Mythes et chants sacrés des Indiens Guaraní, 1974
- Archéologie de la violence. La guerre dans les sociétés primitives, 1977
- Archeology of Violence (Recherches d'anthropologie politique), 1980

== See also ==
- Endemic warfare
