= François Dosse =

French historian and philosopher

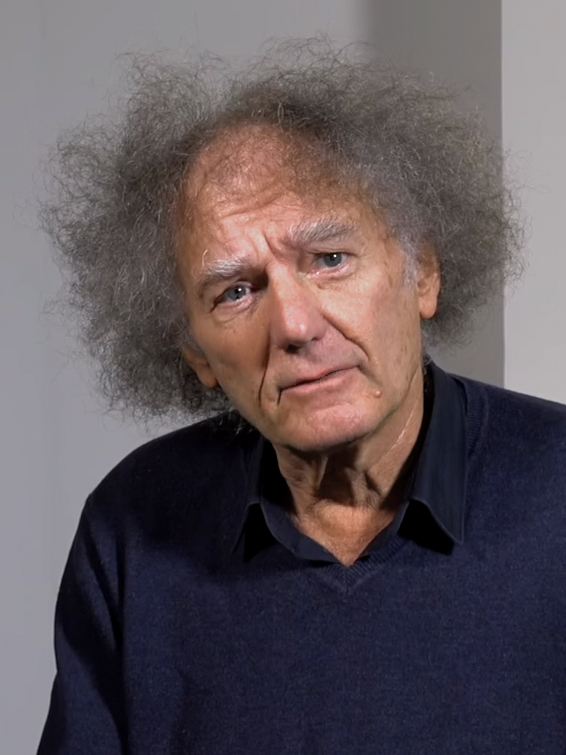
- Dosse in 2018
- Born: 22 September 1950 (age 76); Paris, France

Education
- Education: Paris Diderot University

Philosophical work
- Era: Contemporary philosophy
- Region: Western philosophy

François Dosse (French: [dos]; born 22 September 1950) is a French historian and philosopher who specializes in intellectual history.

== Biography ==
After devoting his doctoral thesis (1983) to the Annales School, Dosse turned his research interests to structuralism, the philosopher Paul Ricœur (his biography, Paul Ricœur. Les sens d'une vie (published in 1997), has become the standard authority) and the historian Michel de Certeau. François Dosse is one of the founders of the journal EspacesTemps. In 2007, he published Gilles Deleuze et Félix Guattari, biographie croisée (English trans. Gilles Deleuze and Félix Guattari: Intersecting Lives [2010]), where he advocated the rehabilitation of Guattari in an intellectual history that had made place only for Deleuze. In 2011 he published a biography on the French historian Pierre Nora and in 2014 on the Greek-French philosopher Cornelius Castoriadis.

Dosse is Professor of Contemporary History at the Institut Universitaire de Formation des Maîtres at Créteil.

== Publications ==
- L'Histoire en miettes. Des "Annales" à la "nouvelle histoire", Paris, La Découverte, 1987 (2nd edition : Presses Pocket, "Agora", 1997).
- Histoire du structuralisme. Tome 1 : Le champ du signe, Paris, La Découverte, 1991. [English translation: "History of Structuralism; The Rising Sign 1945-1966"]
- Histoire du structuralisme. Tome 2 : Le chant du cygne, Paris, La Découverte, 1992. [English translation: "History of Structuralism; The Sign Sets 1967-Present"]
- L'Instant éclaté. Entretien avec Pierre Chaunu, Paris, Aubier, 1994.
- L'Empire du sens. L'humanisation des sciences humaines, Paris, La Découverte, 1995.
- Paul Ricœur. Les sens d'une vie, Paris, La Découverte, 1997.
- L'Histoire, Paris, Armand Colin, 2000.
- Michel de Certeau. Le marcheur blessé, Paris, La Découverte, 2002.
- La Marche des idées. Histoire des intellectuels, histoire intellectuelle, Paris, La Découverte, 2003.
- Le Pari biographique. Écrire une vie, Paris, La Découverte, 2005, 2011.
- Paul Ricœur, Michel de Certeau. Entre le dire et le faire, Paris, Cahiers de l'Herne, 2006.
- Paul Ricœur et les sciences humaines, Paris, La Découverte, 2007.
- Gilles Deleuze et Félix Guattari, biographie croisée, Paris, La Découverte, 2007. [English translation: "Gilles Deleuze and Félix Guattari: Intersecting Lives"]
- Historicités, co-edited by Christian Delacroix and Patrick Garcia, Paris, La Découverte, 2009.
- Renaissance de l'événement, Paris, PUF, coll. « Le nœud gordien », 2010.
- Pierre Nora. Homo Historicus, Paris, Perrin, 2011.
- Castoriadis. Une vie, Paris, La Découverte, 2014.
- Les hommes de l'ombre : Portraits d'éditeurs, Paris, Perrin, 2014.
- Le Philosophe et le Président, Paris, Stock, 2017.
- La saga des intellectuels français I: À l'épreuve de l'histoire (1944-1968), Paris, Gallimard, 2018.
- La saga des intellectuels français II: L’avenir en miettes (1968-1989), Paris, Gallimard, 2018.
- Pierre Vidal-Naquet. Une vie, Paris, La Découverte, 2020.
- Amitiés philosophiques, éditions Odile Jacob, 2021.
- Macron ou les illusions perdues - Les larmes de Paul Ricœur, Le Passeur, 2022.
- Les vérités du roman : Une histoire du temps présent, éditions Le Cerf, 2023.
- Vincennes. Heurs et malheurs de l'université de tous les possibles, Paris, Payot, 2024.
