= Louis Janover =

French essayist, translator and publisher

Louis Janover (born 1937) is a French essayist, translator and publisher. He is a theorist of council communism.

In 1956, he signed a leaflet drafted mainly by André Breton with the surrealist group, Hongrie, soleil levant, supporting the Hungarian Revolution of 1956.

He was member of the Spartacus group (1961-1963) alongside Roger Langlais and Bernard Pécheur. In 1961, he signed the "Manifesto of the 121" in the first and only issue of the surrealist magazine Sédition, which was also signed by André Breton, Michèle Bernstein and Guy Debord.

Following the dissolution of the Spartacus group, he created and directed from 1963 to 1969 the magazine Front Noir, where he collaborated with Gaëtan Langlais, a member of the Letterist International, and Jacques Moreau, a painter and engraver close to Guy Debord. Fiercely opposed to the theories of the Situationist International, he published many council communist texts in his magazine and proposes to develop a radical critique of the concept of the avant-garde.

Close to Maximilien Rubel, he was co-director of the journal Études de marxologie.

In addition to the publication of his own essays, he is a scientific editor and collection director for Éditions Gallimard, the Bibliothèque de la Pléiade, Paris-Méditerranée, the Éditions Sulliver, and the Éditions de La Nuit.
