= L'Homme =

French anthropological journal

- Discipline: Anthropology
- Language: French
- Edited by: Cléo Carastro and Caterina Guenzi

Publication details
- History: 1961-present
- Publisher: École des hautes études en sciences sociales (France)
- Frequency: Quarterly

Standard abbreviations
- ISO 4: Homme

Indexing
- ISSN: 0439-4216
- OCLC no.: 1752231

Links
- Journal homepage

L'Homme. Revue française d'anthropologie, is a French anthropological journal established in 1961 by Émile Benveniste, Pierre Gourou, and Claude Lévi-Strauss at the École pratique des hautes études, as a French counterpart to Man and American Anthropologist.

In 1996 the editorship passed from Jean Pouillon, who had held the post from the journal's inception, to Jean Jamin. Since 2016, Cléo Carastro and Caterina Guenzi are the two editors of the journal.
