= History of anarchism =

According to different scholars, the history of anarchism either goes back to ancient and prehistoric ideologies and social structures, or begins in the 19th century as a formal movement. As scholars and anarchist philosophers have held a range of views on what anarchism means, it is difficult to outline its history unambiguously. Some feel anarchism is a distinct, well-defined movement stemming from 19th-century class conflict, while others identify anarchist traits long before the earliest civilisations existed.

The first traces of formal anarchist thought can be found in ancient Greece and China, where numerous philosophers questioned the necessity of the state and declared the moral right of the individual to live free from coercion. During the Middle Ages, some religious sects espoused libertarian thought, and the Age of Enlightenment, along with the attendant rise of rationalism and science, signalled the birth of the modern anarchist movement.

Alongside Marxism, modern anarchism was a significant part of the workers' movement at the end of the 19th century. Modernism, industrialisation, reaction to capitalism and mass migration helped anarchism to flourish and to spread around the globe. Major anarchist schools of thought sprouted up as anarchism grew as a social movement, particularly anarcho-collectivism, anarcho-communism, anarcho-syndicalism, and individualist anarchism. As the workers' movement grew, the divide between anarchists and Marxists grew as well. The two currents formally split at the fifth congress of the First International in 1872. Anarchists participated enthusiastically in the Russian Revolution, but as soon as the Bolsheviks established their authority, anarchist movements, most notably the Makhnovshchina and the Kronstadt rebellion, were harshly suppressed.

Anarchism played a historically prominent role during the Spanish Civil War, when an anarchist territory was established in Catalonia. Revolutionary Catalonia was organised along anarcho-syndicalist lines, with powerful labor unions in the cities and collectivised agriculture in the country, but ended in the defeat of the anarchists.

In the 1960s, anarchism re-emerged as a global political and cultural force. In association with the New Left and Post-left tendencies, anarchism has influenced social movements that espouse personal autonomy and direct democracy. It has also played major roles in the anti-globalization movement, Zapatista revolution, and Rojava revolution.

== Background ==
There has been some controversy over the definition of anarchism and hence its history. One group of scholars considers anarchism strictly associated with class struggle. Others feel this perspective is far too narrow. While the former group examines anarchism as a phenomenon that occurred during the 19th century, the latter group looks to ancient history to trace anarchism's roots. Anarchist philosopher Murray Bookchin describes the continuation of the "legacy of freedom" of humankind (i.e. the revolutionary moments) that existed throughout history, in contrast with the "legacy of domination" which consists of states, capitalism and other organisational forms.

The three most common forms of defining anarchism are the "etymological" (an-archei, without a ruler, but anarchism is not merely a negation); the "anti-statism" (while this seems to be pivotal, it certainly does not describe the essence of anarchism); and the "anti-authoritarian" definition (denial of every kind of authority, which over-simplifies anarchism). Along with the definition debates, the question of whether it is a philosophy, a theory or a series of actions complicates the issue. Philosophy professor Alejandro de Acosta proposes that anarchism is "a decentralized federation of philosophies as well as practices and ways of life, forged in different communities and affirming diverse geohistories".

== Precursors ==
=== Prehistoric and ancient era ===
Many scholars of anarchism, including anthropologists Harold Barclay and David Graeber, claim that some form of anarchy dates back to prehistory. The longest period of human existence, that before the recorded history of human society, was without a separate class of established authority or formal political institutions. Long before anarchism emerged as a distinct perspective, humans lived for thousands of years in self-governing societies without a special ruling or political class. It was only after the rise of hierarchical societies that anarchist ideas were formulated as a critical response to, and a rejection of, coercive political institutions and hierarchical social relationships.

Taoism, which developed in ancient China, has been linked to anarchist thought by some scholars. Taoist sages Lao Tzu and Zhuang Zhou, whose principles were grounded in an "anti-polity" stance and a rejection of any kind of involvement in political movements or organisations, developed a philosophy of "non-rule" in the Tao Te Ching and the Zhuangzi. Taoists were trying to live in harmony with nature according to the precepts of their religion by doing this. There is an ongoing debate whether exhorting rulers not to rule is somehow an anarchist objective. A new generation of Taoist thinkers with anarchic leanings appeared during the chaotic Wei-Jin period. Taoism and neo-Taoism had principles more akin to a philosophical anarchism—an attempt to delegitimise the state and question its morality—and were pacifist schools of thought, in contrast with their Western counterparts some centuries later. Former professor emeritus of history at California State University Milton W. Meyer has stated that in his opinion, early Taoists were "early anarchists" who believed in concepts often found in states such as anti-intellectualism and "laissez-faire". Taoist anarchists did not believe in religious traditions such as rituals and the concepts of morality and good and evil.

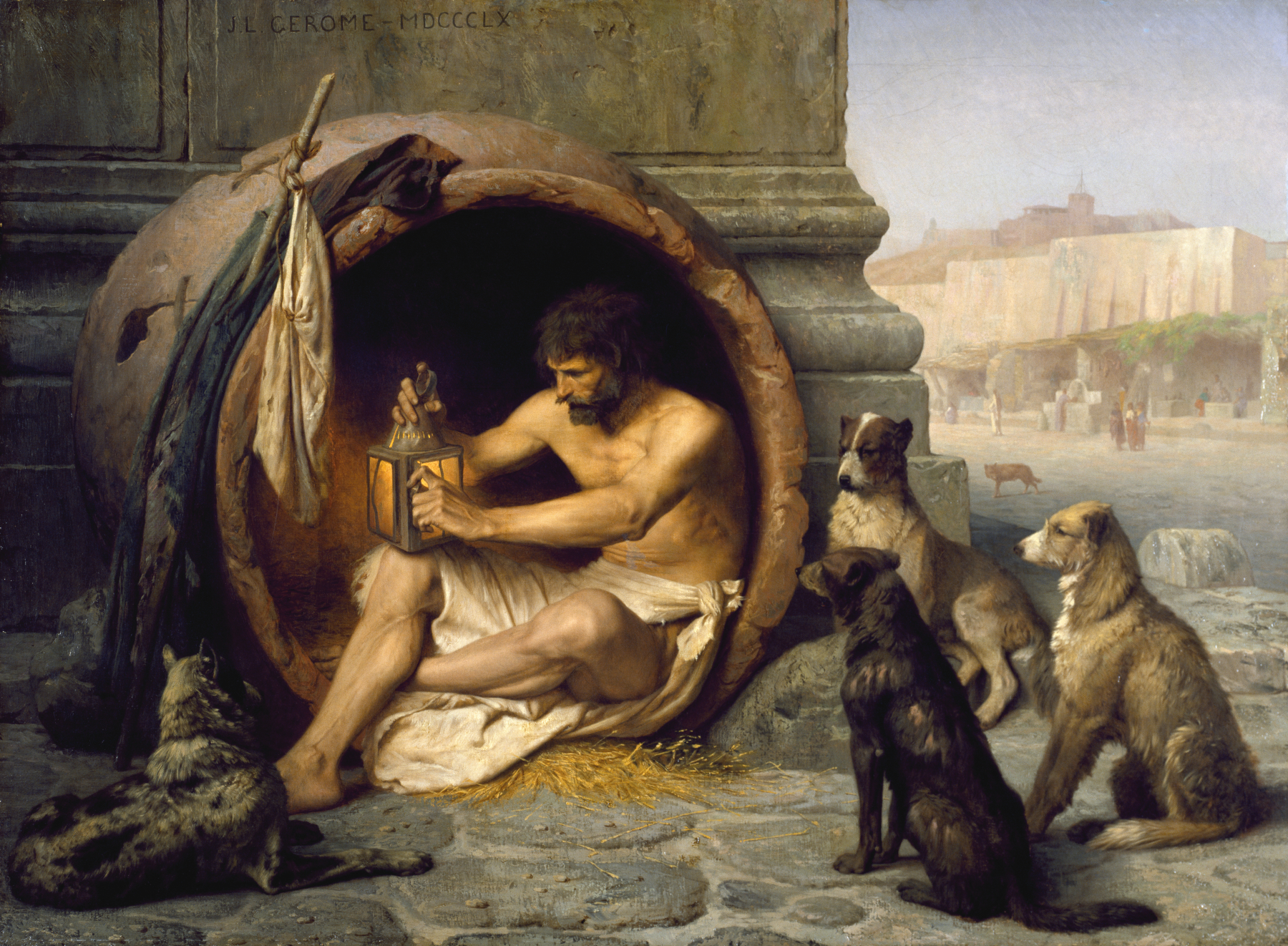
Diogenes of Sinope advocated anarchistic forms of society

Some convictions and ideas deeply held by modern anarchists were first expressed in ancient Greece. The first known political usage of the word anarchy (Ancient Greek: ἀναρχία) appeared in plays by Aeschylus and Sophocles in the fifth century BC. Ancient Greece also saw the first Western instance of anarchy as a philosophical ideal mainly, but not only, by the Cynics and Stoics. The Cynics Diogenes of Sinope and Crates of Thebes are both supposed to have advocated for anarchistic forms of society, although little remains of their writings. Their most significant contribution was the radical approach of nomos (law) and physis (nature). Contrary to the rest of Greek philosophy, aiming to blend nomos and physis in harmony, Cynics dismissed nomos (and in consequence: the authorities, hierarchies, establishments and moral code of polis) while promoting a way of life, based solely on physis. Zeno of Citium, the founder of Stoicism, who was much influenced by the Cynics, described his vision of an egalitarian utopian society around 300 BC. Zeno's Republic advocates a form of anarchic society where there is no need for state structures. He argued that although the necessary instinct of self-preservation leads humans to egotism, nature has supplied a corrective to it by providing man with another instinct, namely sociability. Like many modern anarchists, he believed that if people follow their instincts, they will have no need of law courts or police, no temples and no public worship, and use no money—free gifts taking the place of monetary exchanges.

Socrates expressed some views appropriate to anarchism. He constantly questioned authority and at the centre of his philosophy stood every man's right to freedom of consciousness. Aristippus, a pupil of Socrates and founder of the Hedonistic school, claimed that he did not wish either to rule or be ruled. He saw the State as a danger to personal autonomy. Not all ancient Greeks had anarchic tendencies. Other philosophers such as Plato and Aristotle used the term anarchy negatively in association with democracy which they mistrusted as inherently vulnerable and prone to deteriorate into tyranny.

Among the ancient precursors of anarchism are often ignored movements within ancient Judaism and Early Christianity. As more contemporary literature shows, anti-state and anti-hierarchy positions can be found in the Tanakh as well as in New Testament texts.

=== Middle Ages ===
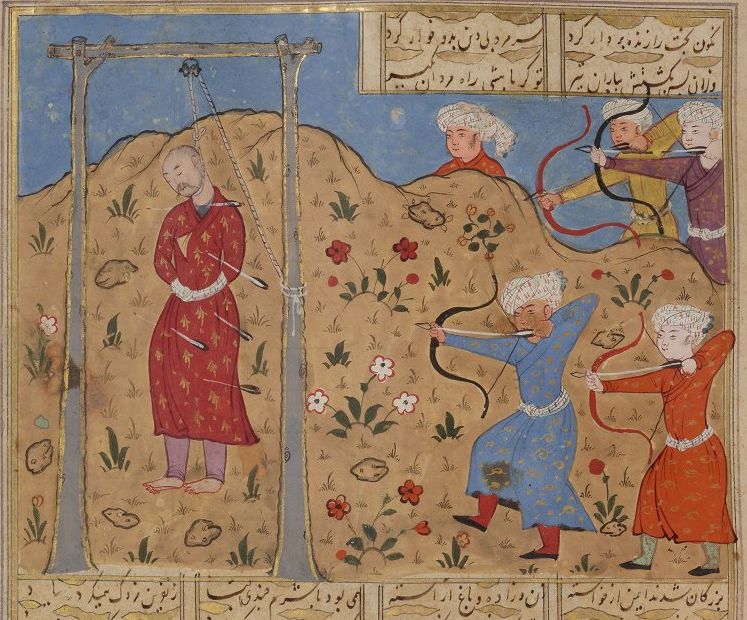
The execution of Mazdak, an anarchist precursor in the Middle East whose followers faced the same fate

In Persia during the Middle Ages a Zoroastrian prophet named Mazdak, now considered a proto-socialist, called for the abolition of private property, free love and overthrowing the king. He and his thousands of followers were massacred in 582 CE, but his teaching influenced Islamic sects in the following centuries. A theological predecessor to anarchism developed in Basra and Baghdad among Mu'tazilite ascetics and Najdat. This form of revolutionary Islam was not communist or egalitarian. It did not resemble current concepts of anarchism, but preached the State was harmful, illegitimate, immoral and unnecessary.

In Europe, Christianity was overshadowing all aspects of life. The Brethren of the Free Spirit was the most notable example of heretic belief that had some vague anarchistic tendencies. They held anticleric sentiments and believed in total freedom. Even though most of their ideas were individualistic, the movement had a social impact, instigating riots and rebellions in Europe for many years. Other anarchistic religious movements in Europe during the Middle Ages included the Hussites and Adamites.

20th-century historian James Joll described anarchism as two opposing sides. In the Middle Ages, zealotic and ascetic religious movements emerged, which rejected institutions, laws and the established order. In the 18th century another anarchist stream emerged based on rationalism and logic. These two currents of anarchism later blended to form a contradictory movement that resonated with a very broad audience.

=== Renaissance and early modern era ===
With the spread of the Renaissance across Europe, anti-authoritarian and secular ideas re-emerged. The most prominent thinkers advocating for liberty, mainly French, were employing utopia in their works to bypass strict state censorship. In Gargantua and Pantagruel (1532–1552), François Rabelais wrote of the Abby of Thelema (from Koine Greek: θέλημα; meaning "will" or "wish"), an imaginary utopia whose motto was "Do as Thou Will". Around the same time, French law student Etienne de la Boetie wrote his Discourse on Voluntary Servitude where he argued that tyranny resulted from voluntary submission and could be abolished by the people refusing to obey the authorities above them. Later still in France, Gabriel de Foigny perceived a utopia with freedom-loving people without government and no need of religion, as he wrote in The Southern Land, Known. For this, Geneva authorities jailed de Foigny. François Fénelon also used utopia to project his political views in the book Les Aventures de Télémaque that infuriated Louis XIV.

Some Reformation currents (like the radical reformist movement of Anabaptists) are sometimes credited as the religious forerunners of modern anarchism. Even though the Reformation was a religious movement and strengthened the state, it also opened the way for the humanistic values of the French Revolution. During the English Civil War, Christian anarchism found one of its most articulate exponents in Gerrard Winstanley, who was part of the Diggers movement. He published a pamphlet, The New Law of Righteousness, calling for communal ownership and social and economic organisation in small agrarian communities. Drawing on the Bible, he argued that "the blessings of the earth" should "be common to all" and "none Lord over others". William Blake has also been said to have espoused an anarchistic political position.

In the New World, the first to use the term "anarchy" to mean something other than chaos was Louis-Armand, Baron de Lahontan in his Nouveaux voyages dans l'Amérique septentrionale, 1703 (New Voyages in Northern America). He described indigenous American society as having no state, laws, prisons, priests or private property as being in anarchy.

The Quaker sect, mostly because of their ahierarchical governance and social relations, based on their beliefs of the divine spirit universally within all people and humanity's absolute equality, had some anarchistic tendencies; such values must have influenced Benjamin Tucker the editor and publisher of the individualist anarchist periodical Liberty.

== Early anarchism ==
=== Developments of the 18th century ===
Modern anarchism grew from the secular and humanistic thought of the Enlightenment. The scientific discoveries that preceded the Enlightenment gave thinkers of the time confidence that humans can reason for themselves. When nature was tamed through science, society could be set free. The development of anarchism was strongly influenced by the works of Jean Meslier, Baron d'Holbach, whose materialistic worldview later resonated with anarchists, and Jean-Jacques Rousseau, especially in his Discourse on Inequality and arguments for the moral centrality of freedom. Rousseau affirmed the goodness in the nature of men and viewed the state as fundamentally oppressive. Denis Diderot's Supplément au voyage de Bougainville (The Supplement to the Voyage of Bougainville) was also influential.

The Storming of the Bastille inspired generations of anarchists

The French Revolution stands as a landmark in the history of anarchism. The use of revolutionary violence by masses would captivate anarchists of later centuries, with such events as the Women's March on Versailles, the Storming of the Bastille and the Réveillon riots seen as the revolutionary archetype. Anarchists came to identify with the Enragés (lit. '"enraged ones"') who expressed the demands of the sans-culottes (lit. '"without breeches"'; commoners) who opposed revolutionary government as a contradiction in terms. Denouncing the Jacobin dictatorship, Jean Varlet wrote in 1794 that "government and revolution are incompatible, unless the people wish to set its constituted authorities in permanent insurrection against itself". In his Manifeste des Égaux (Manifesto of the Equals) of 1801, Sylvain Maréchal looked forward to the disappearance, once and for all, of "the revolting distinction between rich and poor, of great and small, of masters and valets, of governors and governed". The French Revolution came to depict in the minds of anarchists that as soon as rebels seize power they become the new tyrants, as evidenced by the state-orchestrated violence of the Reign of Terror. The proto-anarchist groups of Enragés and sans-culottes were ultimately executed by guillotine.

The debate over the effects of the French Revolution on the anarchist cause continues to this day. To anarchist historian Max Nettlau, the French revolution was a turning point in anarchistic thought, as it promoted the ideals of "Liberty, Fraternity, and Equality". Yet he felt that the outcome did nothing more than re-shape and modernise the militaristic state. Russian revolutionary and anarchist thinker Peter Kropotkin, however, traced the origins of the anarchist movement further back, linking it to struggles against authority in feudal societies and earlier revolutionary traditions. In a more moderate approach, independent scholar Sean Sheehan points out that the French Revolution proved that even the strongest political establishments can be overthrown.

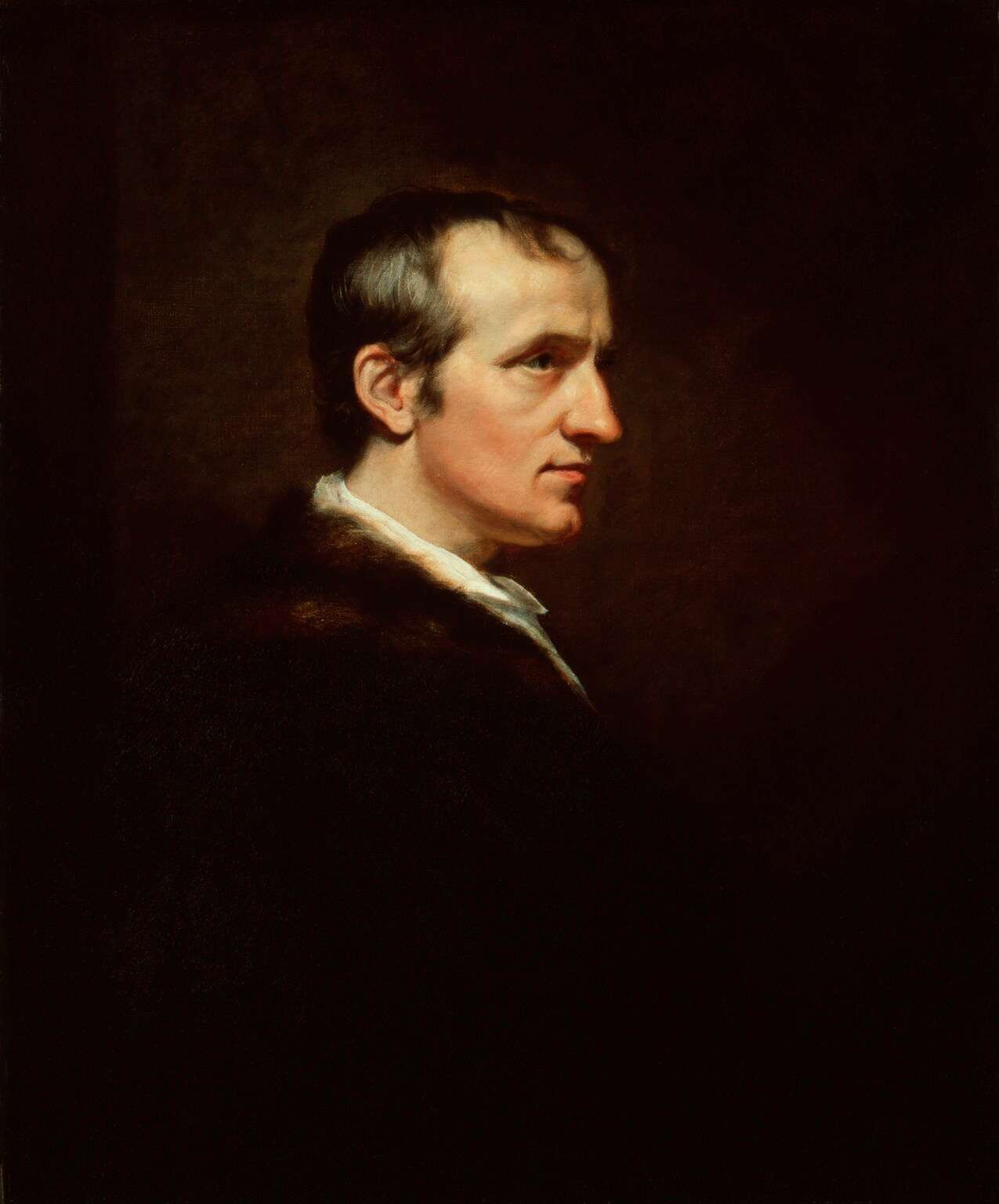
William Godwin, a founder of modern anarchist theory

William Godwin in England was the first to develop an expression of modern anarchist thought. He is generally regarded as the founder of the school of thought known as philosophical anarchism. He argued in Political Justice (1793) that government has an inherently malevolent influence on society, and that it perpetuates dependency and ignorance. He thought the spread of the use of reason to the masses would eventually cause the government to wither away as an unnecessary force. Although he did not accord the state with moral legitimacy, he was against the use of revolutionary tactics for removing a government from power. Rather, he advocated for its replacement through a process of peaceful evolution. His aversion to the imposition of a rules-based society led him to denounce, as a manifestation of the people's "mental enslavement", the foundations of law, property rights and even the institution of marriage. He considered the basic foundations of society as constraining the natural development of individuals to use their powers of reasoning to arrive at a mutually beneficial method of social organisation. In each case, government and its institutions are shown to constrain the development of one's capacity to live wholly in accordance with the full and free exercise of private judgement.

=== Proudhon and Stirner ===
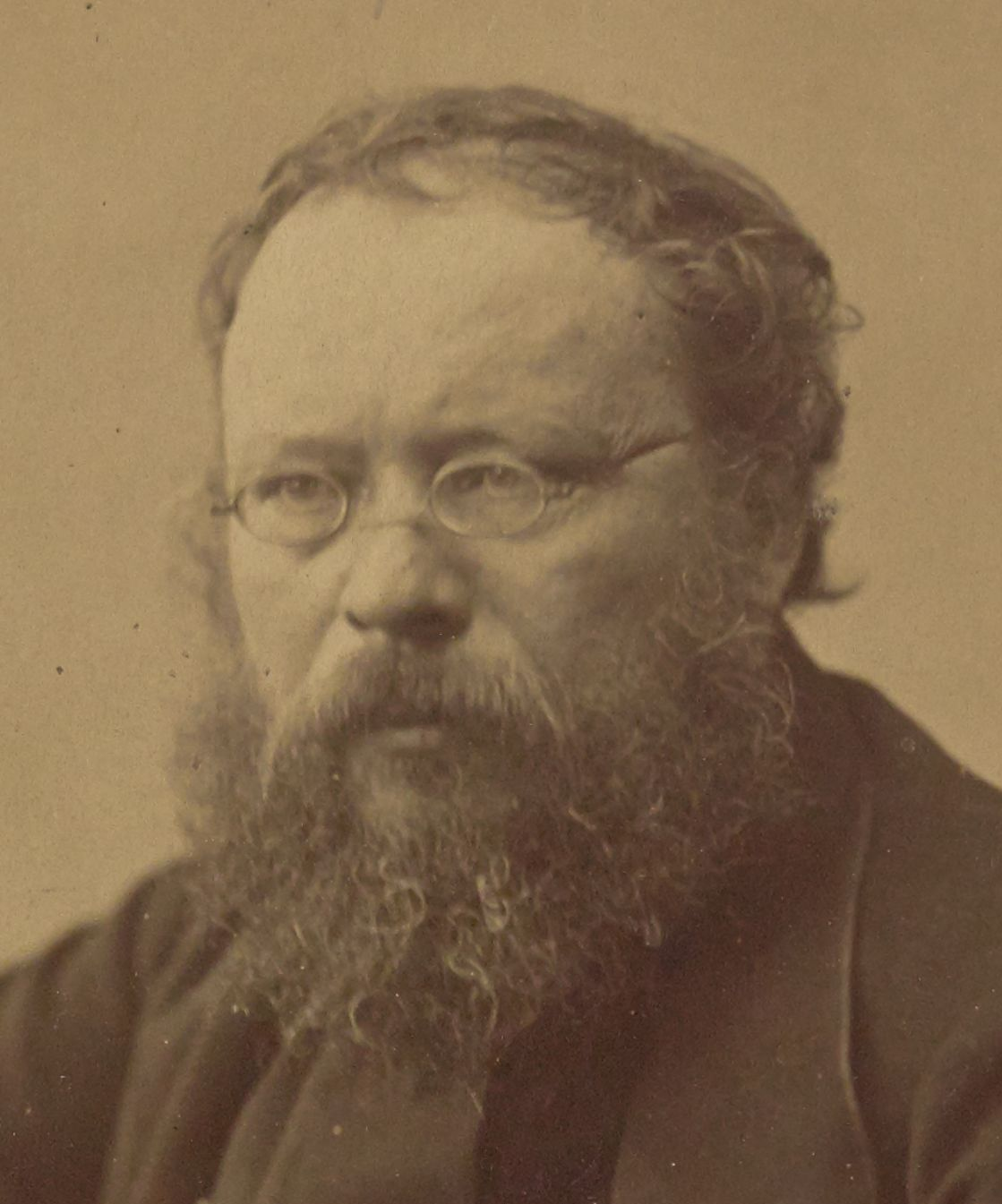
Pierre-Joseph Proudhon, the first self-described anarchist and founder of mutualism

Frenchman Pierre-Joseph Proudhon is regarded as the founder of modern anarchism, a label he adopted in his groundbreaking work What is Property? Or, an Inquiry into the Principle of Right and Government (French: Qu'est-ce que la propriété? Recherche sur le principe du droit et du gouvernement) published in 1840. In it he asks "What is property?", a question that he answers with the famous accusation "Property is theft". Proudhon's theory of mutualism rejects the state, capitalism, and communism. It calls for a co-operative society in which the free associations of individuals are linked in a decentralised federation based on a "Bank of the People" that supplies workers with free credit. He contrasted this with what he called "possession", or limited ownership of resources and goods only while in more or less continuous use. Later, Proudhon also added that "Property is liberty" and argued that it was a bulwark against state power.

Mutualists would later play an important role in the First International, especially at the first two Congresses held in Geneva and Lausanne, but diminished in European influence with the rise of anarcho-communism. Instead, Mutualism would find fertile ground among American individualists in the late 19th century.

In Spain, Ramón de la Sagra established the anarchist journal El Porvenir in La Coruña in 1845 which was inspired by Proudhon's ideas. Catalan politician Francesc Pi i Margall became the principal translator of Proudhon's works into Spanish. He would later briefly become president of Spain in 1873 while leader of the Democratic Republican Federal Party, where he tried to implement some of Proudhon's ideas.

An influential form of individualist anarchism called egoism or egoist anarchism, was expounded by one of the earliest and best-known proponents of individualist anarchism, German philosopher Max Stirner. Stirner's The Ego and Its Own (German: Der Einzige und sein Eigentum; also translated as The Individual and his Property or The Unique and His Property), published in 1844, is a founding text of the philosophy. Stirner was critical of capitalism as it creates class warfare where the rich will exploit the poor, using the state as its tool. He also rejected religions, communism and liberalism, as all of them subordinate individuals to God, a collective, or the state. According to Stirner the only limitation on the rights of the individual is their power to obtain what they desire, without regard for God, state, or morality. He held that society does not exist, but "the individuals are its reality". Stirner advocated self-assertion and foresaw unions of egoists, non-systematic associations continually renewed by all parties' support through an act of will, which proposed as a form of organisation in place of the state. Egoist anarchists claimed that egoism will foster genuine and spontaneous union between individuals. Stirner was proposing an individual rebellion, which would not seek to establish new institutions nor anything resembling a state.

=== Revolutions of 1848 ===
Europe was shocked by another revolutionary wave in 1848 which started once again in Paris. The new government, consisting mostly of Jacobins, was backed by the working class but failed to implement meaningful reforms. Pierre-Joseph Proudhon and Russian revolutionary Mikhail Bakunin were involved in the events of 1848. The failure of the revolution shaped Proudhon's views. He became convinced that a revolution should aim to destroy authority, not grasp power. He saw capitalism as the root of social problems and government, using political tools only, as incapable of confronting the real issues. The course of events of 1848, radicalised Bakunin who, due to the failure of the revolutions, lost his confidence in any kind of reform.

Other anarchists active in the 1848 Revolution in France include Anselme Bellegarrigue, Ernest Coeurderoy and the early anarcho-communist Joseph Déjacque, who was the first person to call himself a libertarian. Unlike Proudhon, Déjacque argued that "it is not the product of his or her labour that the worker has a right to, but to the satisfaction of his or her needs, whatever may be their nature". Déjacque was also a critic of Proudhon's mutualist theory and anti-feminist views. Returning to New York, he was able to serialise his book in his periodical Le Libertaire, Journal du Mouvement social. The French anarchist movement, though self-described as "mutualists", started gaining pace during 1860s as workers' associations began to form.

== Classical anarchism ==
The decades of the late 19th and the early 20th centuries constitute the Belle Époque of anarchist history. In this "classical" era, roughly defined as the period between the Paris Commune of 1871 and the Spanish Civil War of 1936 to 1939 (or the 1840s/1860s through 1939), anarchism played a prominent role in working-class struggles (alongside Marxism) in Europe as well as in the Americas, Asia, and Oceania. Modernism, mass migration, railroads and access to printing all helped anarchists to advance their causes.

=== First International and Paris Commune ===
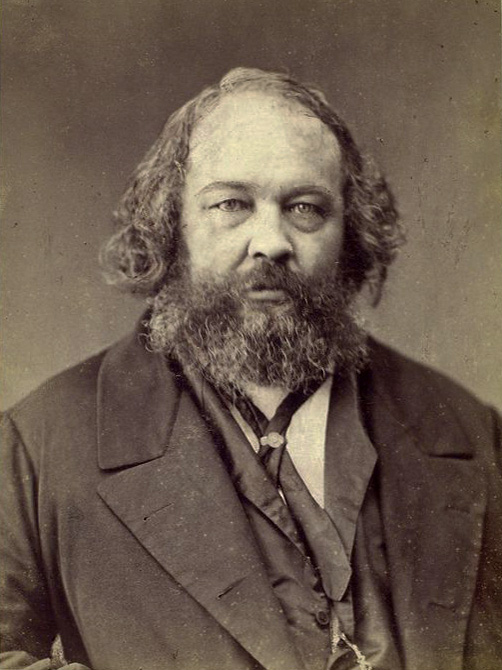
Mikhail Bakunin, a leading collectivist anarchist who clashed with Karl Marx at the Hague Congress of 1872, causing a schism in the First International

In 1864, the creation of the International Workingmen's Association (IWA, also called the "First International") united diverse revolutionary currents - including socialist Marxists, trade unionists, communists and anarchists. Karl Marx, a leading figure of the International, became a member of its General Council.

Four years later, in 1868, Mikhail Bakunin joined the First International with his collectivist anarchist associates. They advocated the collectivisation of property and the revolutionary overthrow of the state. Bakunin corresponded with other members of the International, seeking to establish a loose brotherhood of revolutionaries who would ensure that the coming revolution would not take an authoritarian course, in sharp contrast with other currents that were seeking to get a firm grasp on state power. Bakunin's energy and writings about a great variety of subjects, such as education and gender equality, helped to increase his influence within the IWA. His main line was that the International should try to promote a revolution without aiming to create a mere government of "experts". Workers should seek to emancipate their class with direct actions, using cooperatives, mutual credit, and strikes, but avoid participation in bourgeois politics. At first, the collectivists worked with the Marxists to push the First International in a more revolutionary socialist direction. Subsequently, the International became polarised into two camps, with Marx and Bakunin as their respective figureheads. Bakunin characterised Marx's ideas as centralist. Because of this, he predicted that if a Marxist party came to power, its leaders would simply take the place of the ruling class they had fought against. Followers of Pierre-Joseph Proudhon, the mutualists, also opposed Marx's state socialism, advocating political abstentionism and small property holdings.

Meanwhile, an uprising after the Franco-Prussian War of 1870 to 1871 led to the formation of the Paris Commune in March 1871. Anarchists had a prominent role in the Commune, next to Blanquists and - to a lesser extent - Marxists. The uprising was greatly influenced by anarchists and had a great impact on anarchist history. Radical socialist views, like Proudhonian federalism, were implemented to a small extent. Most importantly, the workers proved they could run their own services and factories. After the defeat of the Commune, anarchists like Eugène Varlin, Louise Michel, and Élisée Reclus were shot or imprisoned. The French Third Republic persecuted socialist supporters for a decade. Leading members of the International who survived the bloody suppression of the Commune fled to Switzerland, where the Anarchist St. Imier International would form in 1872.

In 1872, the conflict between Marxists and anarchists climaxed. Marx had, since 1871, proposed the creation of a political party, which anarchists found to be an appalling and unacceptable prospect. Various groups (including Italian sections, the Belgian Federation and the Jura Federation) rejected Marx's proposition at the 1872 Hague Congress. They saw it as an attempt to create state socialism that would ultimately fail to emancipate humanity. In contrast, they proposed political struggle through social revolution. Finally, anarchists were expelled from the First International. In response, the federalist sections formed their own International at the St. Imier Congress, adopting a revolutionary anarchist programme.

=== Emergence of anarcho-communism ===
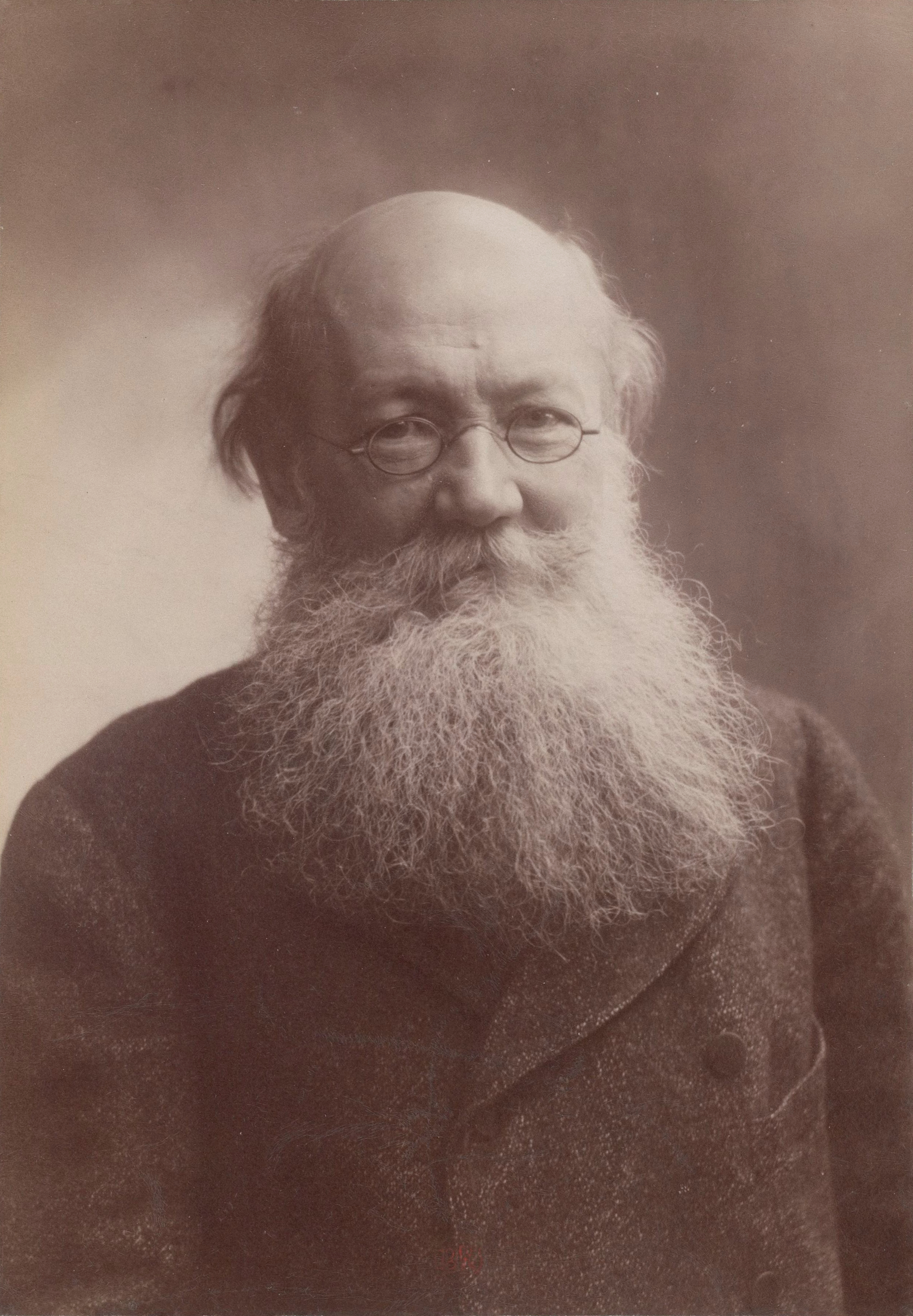
Peter Kropotkin, a prominent anarcho-communist thinker who aimed to ground anarchism in scientific theory

Anarcho-communism developed out of radical socialist currents after the 1789 French Revolution but was first formulated as such in the Italian section of the First International. It was the convincing critique of Carlo Cafiero and Errico Malatesta that paved the way for anarcho-communism to surpass collectivism; they argued that collectivism would inevitably end in competition and inequality. Essayist Alain Pengam comments that between 1880 and 1890 the perspective of a revolution was thought to be closed. Anarcho-communists had anti-organisational tendencies, opposed political and trade-union struggles (such as the eight-hour day) as being overly reformist, and in some cases favoured acts of terrorism. Finding themselves increasingly isolated, they opted to join the workers' movements after 1890.

With the aid of Peter Kropotkin's optimism and persuasive writing, anarcho-communism became the major anarchist current in Europe and abroad—except in Spain where anarcho-syndicalism prevailed. The theoretical work of Kropotkin and Malatesta grew in importance later as it expanded and developed pro-organisationalist and insurrectionary anti-organisationalist sections. Kropotkin elaborated on the theory behind the revolution of anarcho-communism saying, "it is the risen people who are the real agent and not the working class organised in the enterprise (the cells of the capitalist mode of production) and seeking to assert itself as labour power, as a more 'rational' industrial body or social brain (manager) than the employers".

=== Organised labour and syndicalism ===
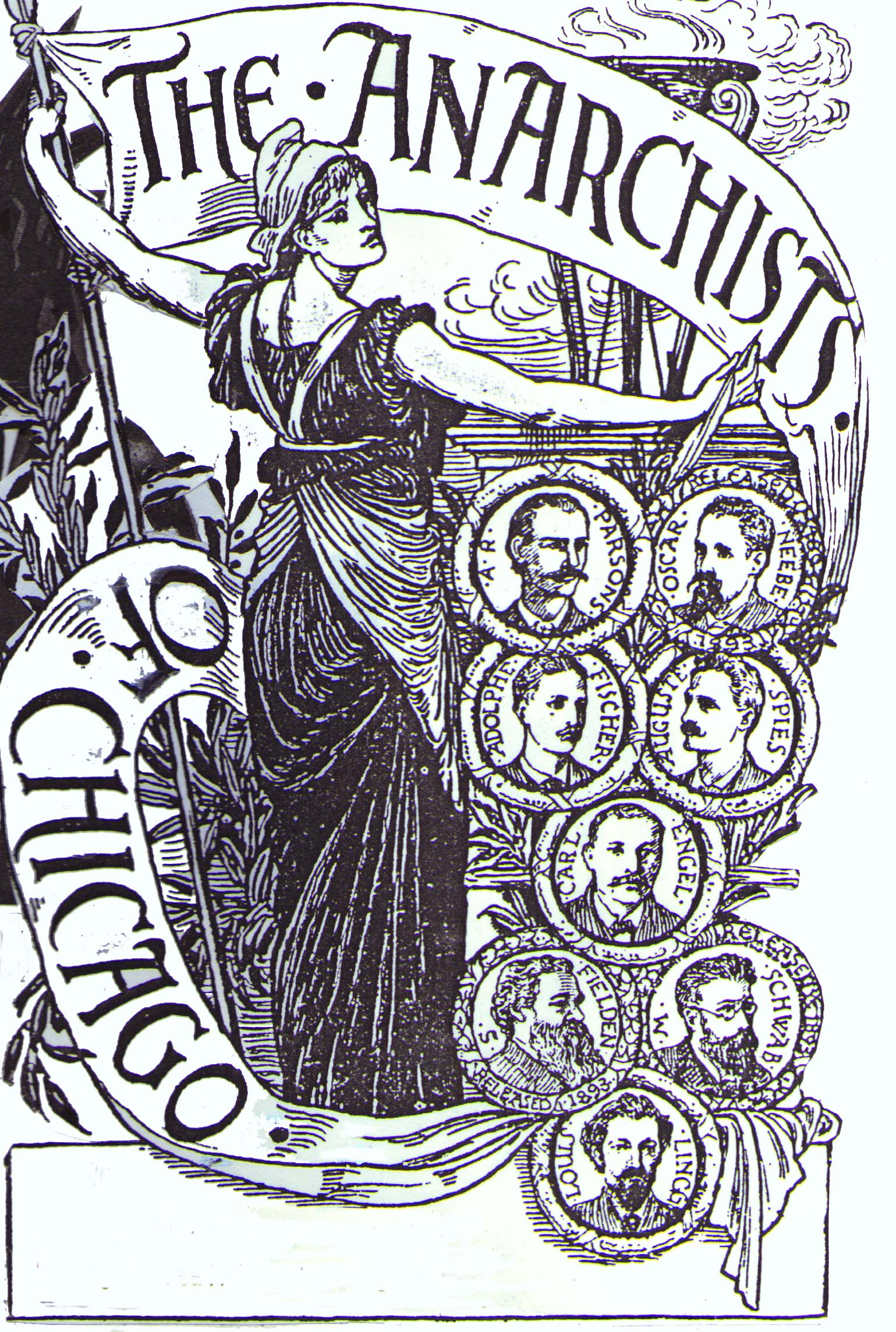
A sympathetic engraving by Walter Crane of the Chicago anarchists executed following the Haymarket affair, a highly significant event for international May Day observances

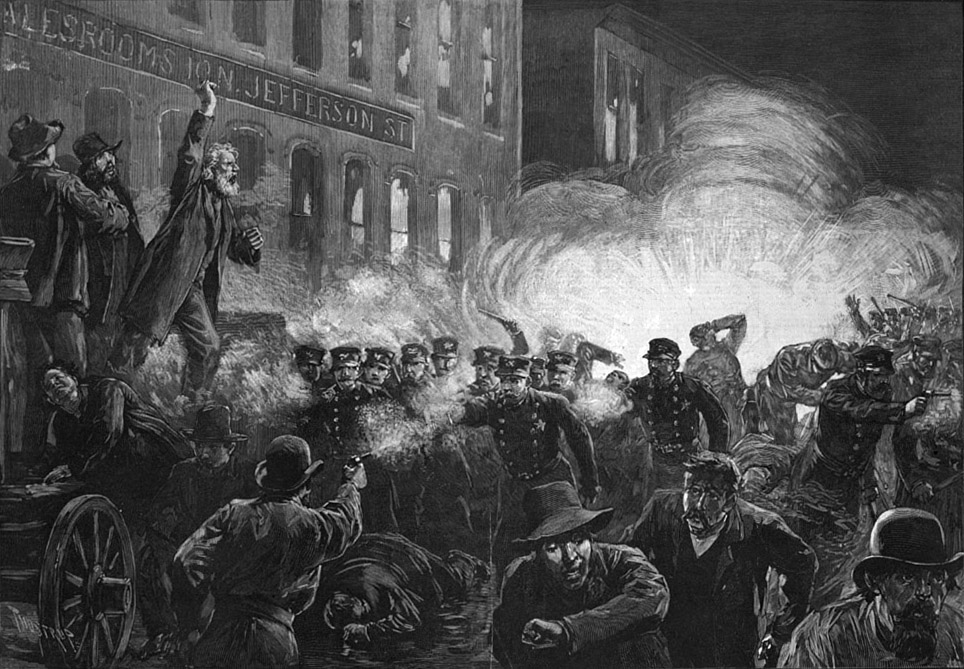
Artistic depiction of Haymarket Affair

Due to a high influx of European immigrants, Chicago was the centre of the American anarchist movement during the 19th century. On 1 May 1886, a general strike was called in several United States cities with the demand of an eight-hour work day, and anarchists allied themselves with the workers' movement despite seeing the objective as reformist. On May 3, a fight broke out in Chicago when strikebreakers attempted to cross the picket line. Two workers died when police opened fire on the crowd. The next day anarchists staged a rally at Chicago's Haymarket Square. A bomb was thrown from a side alley. In the ensuing panic, police opened fire on the crowd and each other. Seven police officers and at least four workers were killed. Eight anarchists, directly and indirectly related to the organisers of the rally, were arrested and charged with the murder of the deceased officers. They became international political celebrities in the labour movement. Four of the men were executed and a fifth committed suicide before his execution. The incident became known as the Haymarket affair and was a setback for the movement and the struggle for the eight-hour day. In 1890 a second attempt, this time international in scope, to organise for the eight-hour day was made. It had the secondary purpose of memorialising those workers killed as a result of the Haymarket affair. Although it had initially been conceived as a one-off event, by the following year the commemoration of International Workers' Day on May Day had become firmly established as an international workers' holiday.

Syndicalism saw its heights from 1894 to 1914, with roots reaching back to 19th century labour movements and the trade unionists of the First International. Subsequently, anarcho-syndicalism's main tenet that economic struggles come before political ones can be traced back to Pierre-Joseph Proudhon, and was the same issue that led to the schism of the First International. Anarcho-syndicalists advocated that labour syndicates should focus not only on the conditions and wages of workers but also on revolutionary objectives.

The French Confédération Générale du Travail (General Confederation of Labour) was one of Europe's most prominent syndicalist organisations and, while rejecting illegalism, was heavily influenced by anarchism. As a grassroots organisation and lab for revolutionary ideas, its structure was exported to other like-minded European organisations. The organisation would later take a reformist path after 1914.

In 1907, the International Anarchist Congress of Amsterdam gathered delegates from most European countries, the United States, Japan and Latin America. A central debate concerned the relation between anarchism and trade unionism. Errico Malatesta and Pierre Monatte strongly disagreed on this issue. Monatte thought that syndicalism was revolutionary and would create the conditions for a social revolution, while Malatesta did not consider syndicalism by itself sufficient. He thought the trade-union movement was reformist and even conservative, citing the phenomenon of professional union officials as essentially bourgeois and anti-worker. Malatesta warned that the syndicalist aims were of perpetuating syndicalism itself, whereas anarchists must always have anarchy as their end goal and consequently must refrain from committing to any particular method of achieving it.

In Spain, syndicalism had grown significantly during the 1880s but the first anarchist related organisations didn't flourish. In 1910 however, the Confederación Nacional del Trabajo (National Confederation of Labour or CNT) was founded and gradually became entwined with anarchism. The CNT was affiliated with the International Workers' Association, a federation of anarcho-syndicalist trade unions founded in 1922. The success of the CNT stimulated the spread of anarcho-syndicalism in Latin America. The Federación Obrera Regional Argentina (Argentine Regional Workers' Federation) reached a quarter of a million members, surpassing social democratic unions.

By the early 20th century, revolutionary syndicalism had spread across the world, from Latin America to Eastern Europe and Asia, with most of its activity then taking place outside of Western Europe.

=== Propaganda of the deed ===
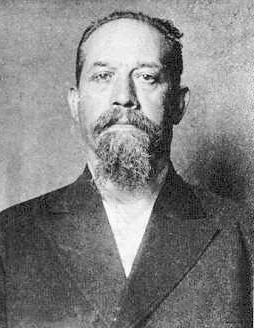
Italian-American anarchist Luigi Galleani whose followers, known as Galleanists, carried out a series of bombings and assassination attempts from 1914 to 1932 in what they saw as attacks on tyrants and enemies of the people

The use of revolutionary political violence, known as propaganda of the deed, was employed by a small but influential part of the anarchist movement over a roughly four decade period, beginning in the 1880s. It was conceived as a form of insurrectionary action used to provoke and inspire the masses to revolution. This was at a time when anarchists were persecuted and revolutionaries were becoming more isolated. The dismemberment of the French socialist movement and, following the suppression of the 1871 Paris Commune, the execution or the exile of many communards to penal colonies favoured individualist political expression and acts. But the prime factor in the rise of propaganda of the deed, as historian Constance Bantman outlines, was the writings of Russian revolutionaries between 1869 and 1891, namely of Mikhail Bakunin and Sergei Nechaev who developed significant insurrectionary strategies.

Paul Brousse, a medical doctor and active militant of violent insurrection, popularised the actions of propaganda of the deed. In the United States, Johann Most advocated publicising violent acts of retaliation against counter-revolutionaries because "we preach not only action in and for itself, but also action as propaganda". Russian anarchist-communists employed terrorism and illegal acts in their struggle. Numerous heads of state were assassinated or attacked by members of the anarchist movement. In 1901, the Polish-American anarchist Leon Czolgosz assassinated the president of the United States, William McKinley. Emma Goldman, who was erroneously suspected of being involved, expressed some sympathy for Czolgosz and incurred a great deal of negative publicity. Goldman also supported Alexander Berkman in his failed assassination attempt of steel industrialist Henry Frick in the wake of the Homestead Strike, and she wrote about how these small acts of violence were incomparable to the deluge of violence regularly committed by the state and capital. In Europe, a wave of illegalism (the embracement of a criminal way of life) spread throughout the anarchist movement, with Marius Jacob, Ravachol, intellectual Émile Henry and the Bonnot Gang being notable examples. The Bonnot Gang in particular justified illegal and violent behavior by claiming that they were "taking back" property that did not rightfully belong to capitalists. In Russia, Narodnaya Volya ("People's Will" which was not an anarchist organisation but nevertheless drew inspiration from Bakunin's work), assassinated Tsar Alexander II in 1881 and gained some popular support. However, for the most part, the anarchist movement in Russia remained marginal in the following years. In the Ottoman Empire, the Boatmen of Thessaloniki were a Bulgarian anarchist revolutionary organisation active 1898-1903.

As early as 1887, important figures in the anarchist movement distanced themselves from both illegalism and propaganda of the deed. Peter Kropotkin, for example, wrote in Le Révolté that "a structure based on centuries of history cannot be destroyed with a few kilos of dynamite". State repression of the anarchist and labour movements, including the infamous 1894 French lois scélérates ("villainous laws"), following a number of successful bombings and assassinations may have contributed to the abandonment of these kinds of tactics, although state repression may have played an equal role in their adoption. Early proponents of propaganda of the deed, like Alexander Berkman, started to question the legitimacy of violence as a tactic. A variety of anarchists advocated the abandonment of these sorts of tactics in favour of collective revolutionary action through the trade union movement.

By the end of the 19th century, it became clear that propaganda of the deed was not going to spark a revolution. Though it was employed by only a minority of anarchists, it gave anarchism a violent reputation and it isolated anarchists from broader social movements. It was abandoned by the majority of the anarchist movement in the early 20th century.

=== Revolutionary wave ===
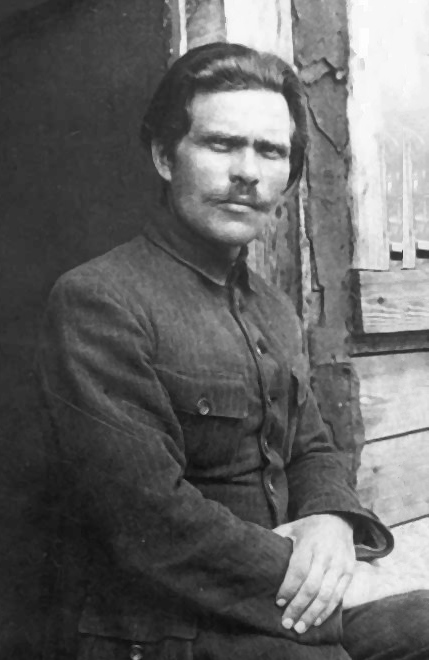
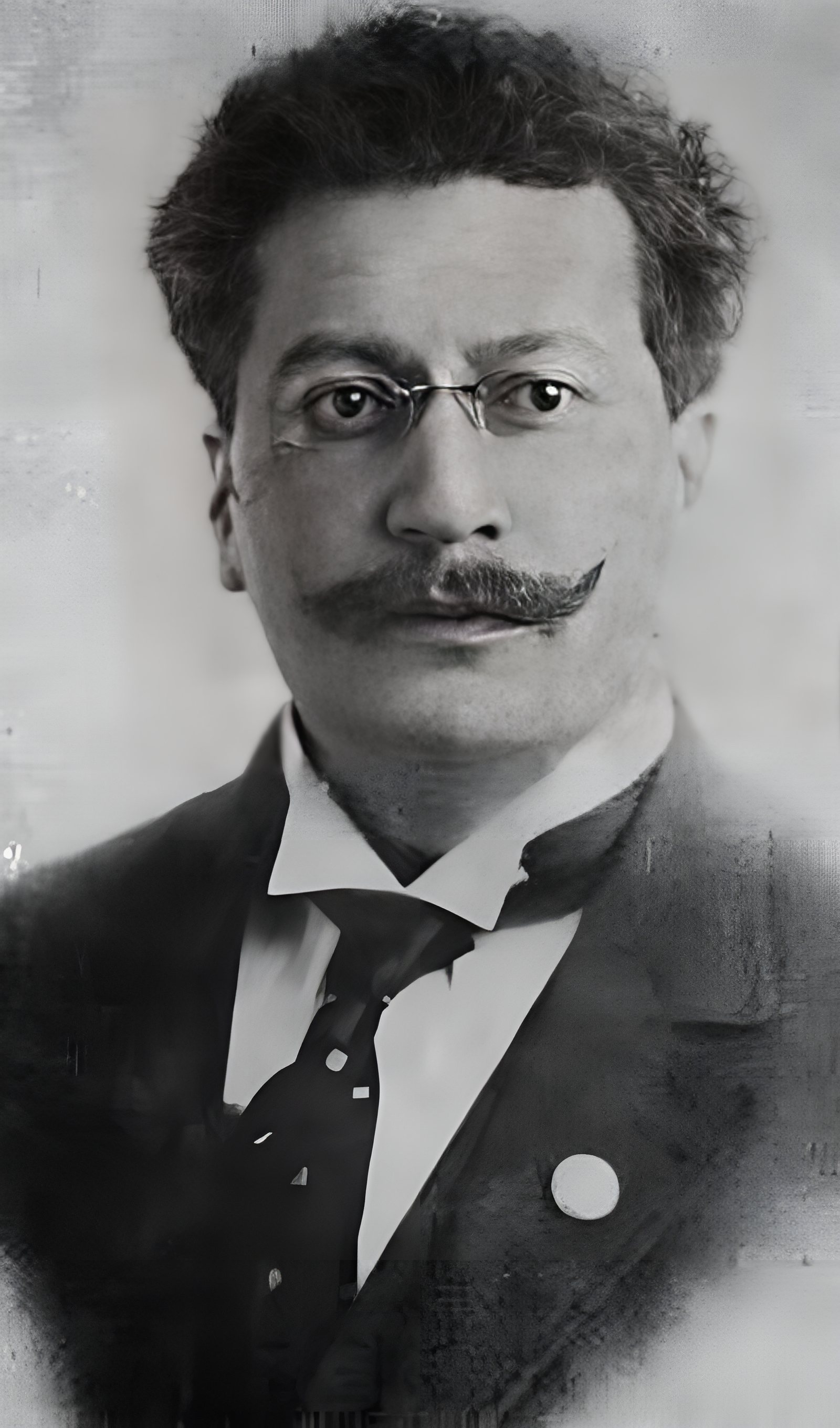
Nestor Makhno of Ukraine (left) and Ricardo Flores Magón of Mexico (right), prominent anarchist revolutionaries of the 20th century

Anarchists were involved in the Strandzha Commune and Krusevo Republic established in Macedonia in Ilinden–Preobrazhenie Uprising of 1903, and in the Mexican Revolution of 1910. The revolutionary wave of 1917–23 saw varying degrees of active participation by anarchists. Following the failed 1905 Russian Revolution, anarchists participated again in both the February and October revolutions of 1917 and were initially enthusiastic about the Bolshevik cause. Prior to the revolution, Lenin had won over anarchists and syndicalists with high praises in his 1917 work The State and Revolution. However, anarchist objections quickly arose. They opposed, for example, the slogan, "All power to the Soviet". The dictatorship of the proletariat was incompatible with the libertarian views of the anarchists, and co-operation shortly ended as the Bolsheviks soon turned against anarchists and other left-wing opposition. After their grasp on power was stabilized, the Bolsheviks crushed the anarchists. Anarchists in central Russia were either imprisoned, driven underground, or joined the victorious Bolsheviks. Anarchists from Petrograd and Moscow fled to Ukraine. There, the Makhnovshchina established an autonomous region of four hundred square miles with a population of approximately seven million. Anarchists who had fought in the Russian Civil War at first against the anti-Bolshevik White Army now also fought the Red Army, Ukrainian People's Army, and the German and Austrian forces who fought under the Treaty of Brest-Litovsk. This conflict culminated in the 1921 Kronstadt rebellion, a garrison in Kronstadt where Baltic Fleet sailors and citizens made demands for reforms. The new government suppressed the rebellion. The Revolutionary Insurgent Army of Ukraine, led by Nestor Makhno, continued to fight until August 1921 when it was crushed by the state only months after the Kronstadt rebellion.

Emma Goldman and Alexander Berkman, who had been deported from the U.S. in 1917, were amongst those agitating in response to Bolshevik policy and the suppression of the Kronstadt uprising. Both wrote accounts of their experiences in Russia, criticising the amount of state control the Bolsheviks exercised. For them, Mikhail Bakunin's predictions on the consequences of Marxist rule, that the leaders of the new socialist state would become the new ruling class, had proven true. In 1920, Peter Kropotkin published a Message to the Workers of the West explaining the false path of state socialism was doomed to fail. Disappointed with the course of events, Goldman and Berkman fled the USSR in 1921, the same year Kropotkin died. By 1925, anarchism was banned under the Bolshevik regime. The victory of the Bolsheviks in the October Revolution and the resulting Russian Civil War did serious damage to anarchist movements internationally. Many workers and activists saw the Bolsheviks' success as setting an example, and communist parties grew at the expense of anarchism and other socialist movements. In France and the United States, for example, members of the major syndicalist movements of the Confédération Générale du Travail (General Confederation of Labour) and Industrial Workers of the World left these organisations to join the Communist International.

From the collapse of anarchism in the newly formed Soviet Union, two anarchist trends arose. The first, platformism, was propagated in the anarchist journal Delo truda by a group of Russian exiles, including Nestor Makhno. Their main objective, as proponent Piotr Arsinov wrote, was to create a non-hierarchical party that would offer "common organisation of our forces on a basis of collective responsibility and collective methods of action". They considered that a lack of organisation was a basic reason of why anarchism had failed. Platformism had the purpose of providing a strategy for class struggle, as Bakunin and Kropotkin had suggested before. The other trend emerged as an organisational alternative to platformism, since it had similarities to party structure. Anarchist intellectual Volin was one of the most notable opponents of platformism, and contributed to the formulation of what he called the anarchist synthesis.

During the German Revolution of 1918–1919, anarchists Gustav Landauer and Erich Mühsam took important leadership positions within the revolutionary councilist structures of the Bavarian Soviet Republic. In Italy, the syndicalist trade union Unione Sindacale Italiana (Italian Syndicalist Union), had half a million members. It played a prominent role in events known as the Biennio Rosso ("Two Red Years") and Settimana Rossa ("Red Week"). In the latter, the monarchy was almost overthrown.

In Mexico, the Mexican Liberal Party was established and during the early 1910s it conducted a series of military offensives, leading to the conquest and occupation of certain towns and districts in Baja California. Under the leadership of anarcho-communist Ricardo Flores Magón, its slogan was Tierra y Libertad ('Land and Liberty'). Magón's journal Regeneración ('Regeneration') had a significant circulation, and he helped urban workers turn to anarcho-syndicalism. He also influenced the Zapata movement.

Ferdinando Nicola Sacco and Bartolomeo Vanzetti, two insurrectionary anarchists and Italian migrants to the United States, were convicted of involvement in an armed robbery and the murders of two people in 1920. After a controversial trial and a series of appeals they were sentenced to death and executed on 23 August 1927. Following their deaths, critical opinion overwhelmingly held that the two men were convicted largely because of their anarchist political beliefs and were unjustly executed. After the Sacco and Vanzetti case, and despite worldwide protests and mainstream media headlines, the anarchist movement faded in the United States.

=== Rise of fascism ===
Italy saw the first struggles between anarchists and fascists. Italian anarchists played a key role in the anti-fascist organisation Arditi del Popolo (The People's Daring Ones or AdP), which was strongest in areas with anarchist traditions. They achieved some success in their activism, such as repelling Blackshirts in the anarchist stronghold of Parma in August 1922. AdP saw growth after the Socialist Party signed the pacification pact with the fascists. AdP consisted of militant proletarians, anarchists, communists and even socialists. It numbered twenty-thousand members in 144 sections. The veteran Italian anarchist, Luigi Fabbri, was one of the first critical theorists of fascism, describing it as "the preventive counter-revolution". Italian anarchists Gino Lucetti and Anteo Zamboni narrowly failed an assassination attempt against Benito Mussolini. Italian anarchists formed various partisan groups during World War II.

In France, where the far-right leagues came close to insurrection in the February 1934 riots, anarchists divided over a united front policy. One tendency was for the creation of a pack with political parties while others objected. In Spain, the Confederación Nacional del Trabajo (National Confederation of Labour or CNT) initially refused to join a popular front electoral alliance. Abstention by their supporters led to a right-wing election victory. In 1936, the CNT changed its policy and anarchist votes helped bring the popular front back to power. Months later, the former ruling class responded with an attempted coup causing the Spanish Civil War (1936–1939). In response to the army rebellion, an anarchist-inspired movement of peasants and workers, supported by armed militias, took control of Barcelona and large areas of rural Spain where they collectivised the land. However, even before the fascist victory in 1939, the anarchists were losing ground in a bitter struggle with the Stalinists, who controlled the distribution of military aid to the Republican cause from the Soviet Union. Stalinist-led troops suppressed the collectives and persecuted both dissident Marxists and anarchists.

In Germany, the Nazis crushed anarchism upon seizing power. Apart from Spain, nowhere else could the anarchist movement provide a solid resistance to various fascist regimes throughout Europe.

=== Spanish Revolution ===
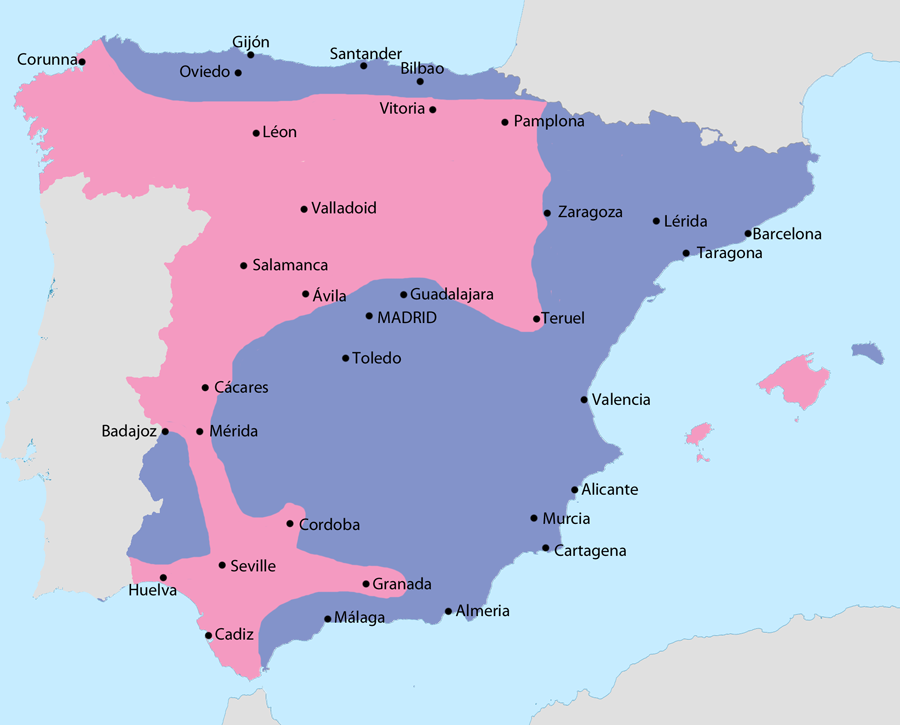
Map of Spain in September 1936 with republican/anarchist control depicted in purple

The Spanish Revolution of 1936 was the first and only time that libertarian socialism became an imminent reality. It stood on the ground of a strong anarchist movement in Spain that dated back to the 19th century. Anarchist groups enjoyed broad social support particularly in Barcelona, Aragon, Andalusia, Levante. Anarchism in Spain leaned towards syndicalism and this yielded to the formation of the Confederación Nacional del Trabajo (CNT) in 1910. The CNT declared that its aim was a libertarian communist society and was organising strikes all over Spain. The Federación Anarquista Ibérica (FAI) was founded later to keep CNT on a pure anarchist path amidst dictator Miguel Primo de Rivera's crackdown on labour movements. The Second Spanish Republic was pronounced in 1931 and brought to power a Republican–Socialist alliance. But instead of the high hopes of the CNT (mostly among gradualists) and others, the repression of the labour movement continued. FAI gained more control of CNT.

In 1936, the Popular Front (an electoral alliance dominated by left-wingers) won the elections and months later the former ruling class responded with an attempted coup causing the Spanish Civil War (1936–1939). In response to the army rebellion, an anarchist-inspired movement of peasants and workers, supported by armed militias, took control of urban and large areas of rural Spain where they collectivised the land. Barcelona was the site of the most dramatic change, as workers broke bourgeois habits and even gender hierarchies. Newly formed anarcho-feminist group Mujeres Libres (Free Women) had an active role in the social transformation in Barcelona. This rebellious culture impressed visitors such as George Orwell. Enterprises and farms were collectivised, and working conditions improved drastically. In rural Aragon money was abolished and the economy was collectivised. Villages were run by popular assemblies in a direct democratic fashion, without coercing individuals to join. Anarchist militia columns, fighting without martial discipline or military rank, despite shortages in military materials, made significant gains at the war front.

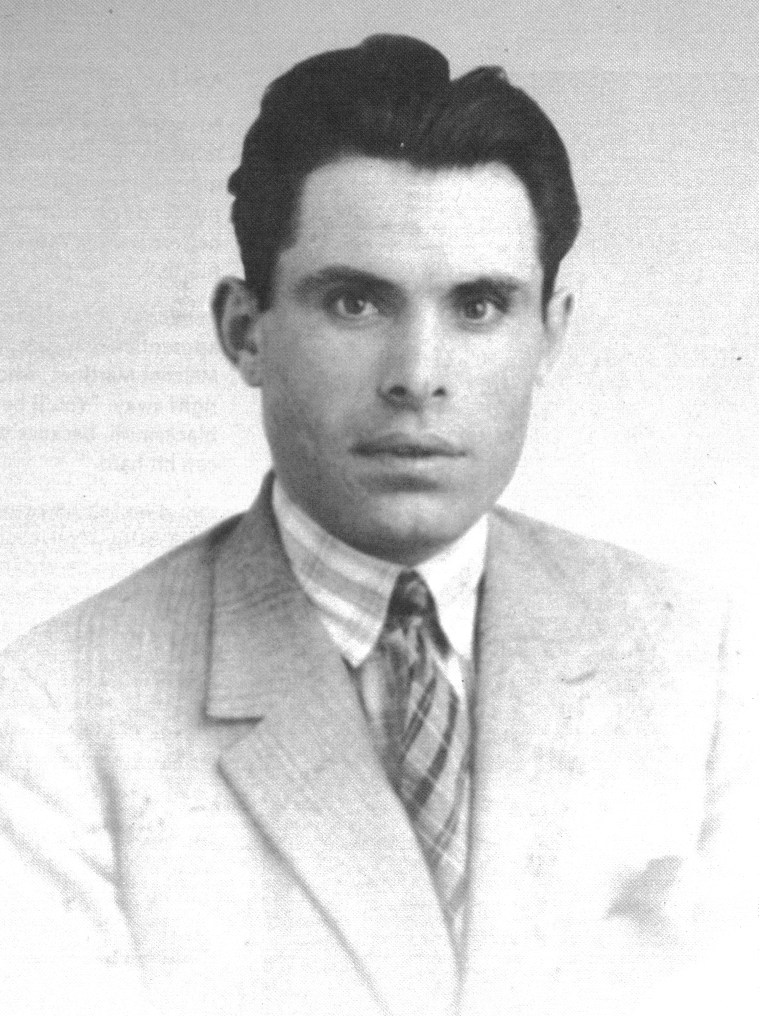
Anarchist Buenaventura Durruti was renowned for his actions in the Spanish Revolution

Anarchists of CNT-FAI faced a major dilemma after the coup had failed in July 1936: either continue their fight against the state or join the anti-fascist left-wing parties and form a government. They opted for the latter and by November 1936, four members of CNT-FAI became ministers in the government of the former trade unionist Francisco Largo Caballero. This was justified by CNT-FAI as a historical necessity since war was being waged, but other prominent anarchists disagreed, both on principle and as a tactical move. In November 1936 the prominent anarcho-feminist Federica Montseny was installed as minister of Health—the first woman in Spanish history to become a cabinet minister.

During the course of the events of the Spanish Revolution, anarchists were losing ground in a bitter struggle with the Stalinists of the Spanish Communist Party, who controlled the distribution of military aid to the Republicans received from the Soviet Union. Stalinist-led troops suppressed the collectives and persecuted both dissident Marxists and anarchists. The fight among anarchists and communists escalated during the May Days, as the Soviet Union sought to control the Republicans.

The 1939 defeat of Republican Spain marked the end of anarchism's classical period. In light of continual anarchist defeats, one can argue about the naivety of 19th-century anarchist thinking—the establishment of state and capitalism was too strong to be destroyed. According to political philosophy professor Ruth Kinna and lecturer Alex Prichard, it is uncertain whether these defeats were the result of a functional error within the anarchist theories, as New Left intellectuals suggested some decades later, or the social context that prevented the anarchists from fulfilling their ambitions. What is certain, though, is that their critique of state and capitalism ultimately proved right, as the world was marching towards totalitarianism and fascism.

=== Anarchism in the colonial world ===
As empires and capitalism were expanding at the turn of the century, so was anarchism which soon flourished in Latin America, East Asia, South Africa and Australia.

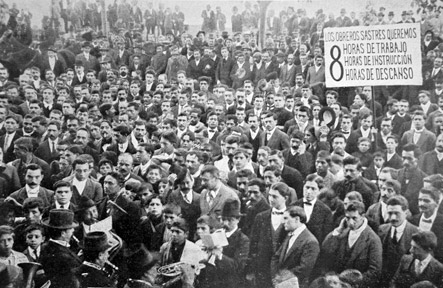
Anarchist demonstration in Argentina, around 1900

Anarchism found fertile ground in Asia and was the most vibrant ideology among other socialist currents during the first decades of 20th century. The works of European philosophers, especially Kropotkin's, were popular among revolutionary youth. Intellectuals tried to link anarchism to earlier philosophical currents in Asia, like Taoism, Buddhism and neo-Confucianism. But the factor that contributed most to the rise of anarchism was industrialisation and the new capitalistic era that eastern Asia was entering. Young Chinese anarchists in the early days of the 20th century voiced the cause of revolutionary anarcho-communism along with humanism, belief in science and universalism in the journal Hsin Shih-chi. Anarchism was growing in influence until the mid-1920s when Bolshevik successes seemed to indicate the way to communism. Likewise in Japan, anarcho-communists such as Kōtoku Shūsui, Osugi Sakae and Hatta Shuzo were inspired by the works of westerners philosophers and opposed capitalism and the state. Shuzo created the school of "pure anarchism". Because of the industrial growth, anarcho-syndicalism also arose for a brief period, before communists prevailed among workers. Tokyo had been a hotspot for anarchist and revolutionary ideas which were circulating among Vietnamese, Korean and Chinese students who travelled to Japan to study. Socialists by then were enthusiastically supporting the idea of "social revolution" and anarchists were in full support of it. In Korea, anarchism took a different course. Korea was under Japanese rule from 1910 to 1945 and in the early phases of that period, anarchists took part in national resistance, forming an anarchist zone in Shinmin Manchuria from 1928 to 1931. Kim Chwa-chin was a prominent figure of the movement. In India, anarchism did not thrive, partly because of its reputation for being violent. The fragile anarchist movement developed in India was more non-statist, rather than anti-statist.

Anarchism travelled to the Eastern Mediterranean along with other radical secular ideas in the cosmopolitan Ottoman Empire. Under the spell of Errico Malatesta, a group of Egyptian anarchists imported anarchism to Alexandria. It was in a transitional stage during that era, as industrialisation and urbanisation were transforming Egypt. Anarchist activity was spread along with other radical secular ideas within the Islamic Empire. In Africa, anarchism appeared from within the continent. A large part of African society, mainly rural, was founded on African communalism which was mostly egalitarian. It had some anarchist elements, without class divisions, formal hierarchies and access to the means of production by all members of the localities. African Communalism was far from being an ideal anarchist society. Gender privileges were apparent, feudalism and slavery did exist in a few areas but not on a mass scale.

Anarchism travelled to Latin America through European immigrants. The most impressive presence was in Buenos Aires, but Havana, Lima, Montevideo, Rio de Janeiro, Santos, São Paulo as well saw the growth of anarchist pockets. Anarchists had a much larger impact on trade unions than their authoritarian left counterparts. In Argentina, Uruguay and Brazil, a strong anarcho-syndicalist current was formed—partly because of the rapid industrialisation of these countries. In 1905, anarchists took control of the Argentine Regional Workers' Federation (FORA) in Argentina, overshadowing social democrats. Likewise, in Uruguay, FORU was created by anarchists in 1905. These syndicates organised a series of general strikes in the following years. After this the success of the Bolsheviks, anarchism gradually declined in these three countries which had been the strongholds of anarchism in Latin America. It is worth noting that the notion of imported anarchism in Latin America has been challenged, as slave rebellions appeared in Latin America before the arrival of European anarchists.

Anarchists became involved in the anti-colonial national-independence struggles of the early 20th century. Anarchism inspired anti-authoritarian and egalitarian ideals among national independence movements, challenging the nationalistic tendencies of many national liberation movements.

== Individualist anarchism ==
=== In the United States ===
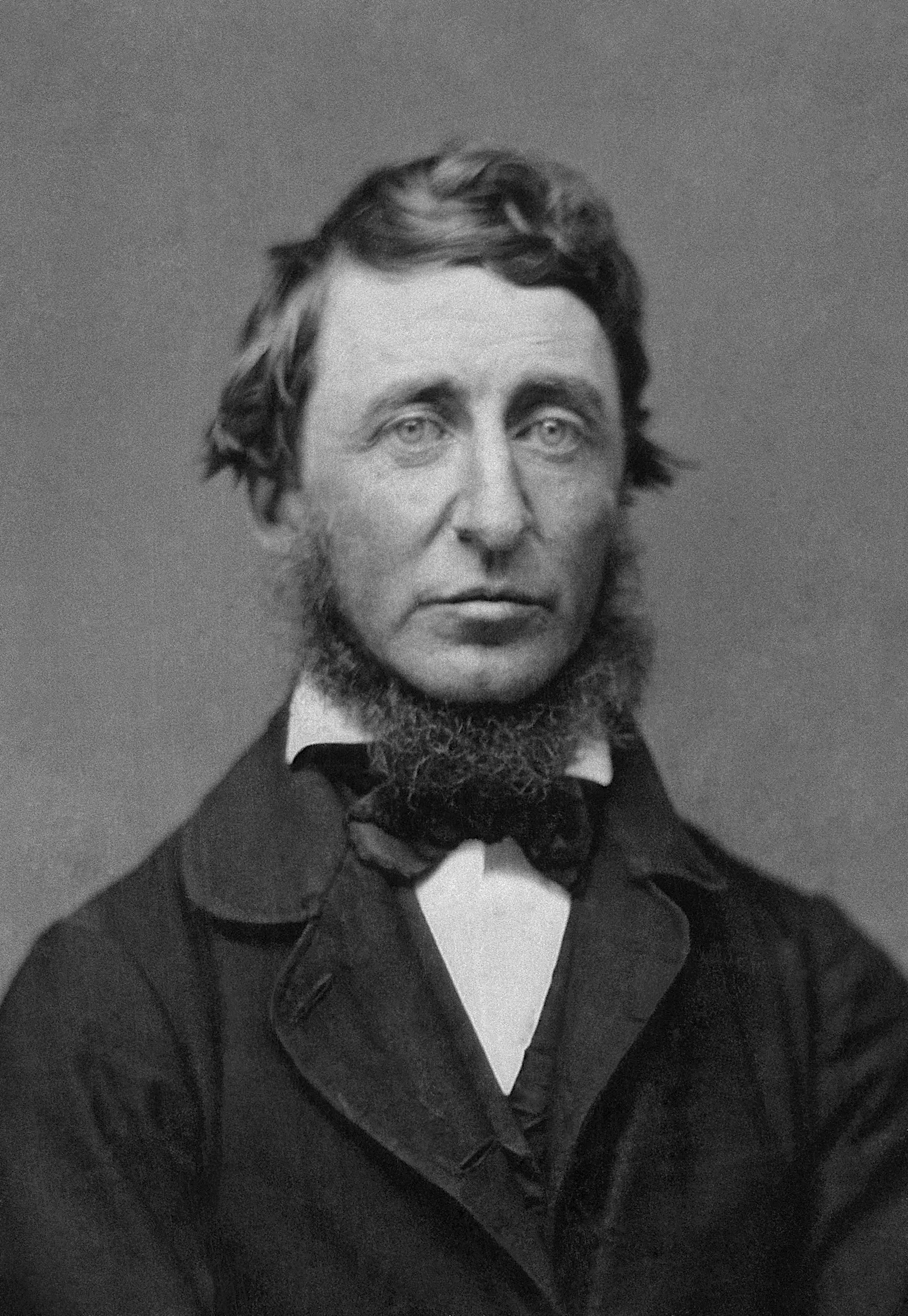
Henry David Thoreau, a prominent figure of early American individualism

American anarchism has its roots in religious groups that fled Europe to escape religious persecution during the 17th century. It sprouted towards individual anarchism as distrust of government was widespread in North America during the next centuries. In sharp contrast with their European counterparts, according to the scholar Marshall, American anarchism was leaning towards individualism and was mainly pro-capitalist, hence described as right-wing libertarianism; however Marshall later stated that capitalism and anarchism are incompatible and American anarchists like Tucker and Spooner were left libertarians. The scholar Martin stated the American anarchists were mutualist anarchists in support of the labor theory of value. American anarchism justified private property as the safeguard of personal autonomy. Henry David Thoreau was an important early influence on individualist anarchist thought in the United States in the mid 19th century. He was skeptical towards government—in his work Civil Disobedience he declared that "That government is best which governs least". He has frequently been cited as an anarcho-individualist, even though he was never rebellious. Josiah Warren was, at the late 19th century, a prominent advocate of a variant of mutualism called equitable commerce, a fair trade system where the price of a product is based on labor effort instead of the cost of manufacturing. Benjamin Tucker, also influenced by Proudhon, was the editor of the prominent anarchist journal Liberty and a proponent of individualism.

In the shade of individualism, there was also anarcho-Christianism as well as some socialist pockets, especially in Chicago. It was after Chicago's bloody protests in 1886 when the anarchist movement became known nationwide. But anarchism quickly declined when it became associated with terrorist violence.

An important concern for American individualist anarchism was free love. Free love particularly stressed women's rights since most sexual laws discriminated against women, for example, marriage laws and anti-birth control measures. Openly bisexual radical Edna St. Vincent Millay and lesbian anarchist Margaret Anderson were prominent among them. Discussion groups organised by the Villagers were frequented by Emma Goldman, among others.

A heated debate among American individualist anarchists of that era was the natural rights versus egoistic approaches. Proponents of naturals rights claimed that without them brutality would prevail, while egoists were proposing that there is no such right, it only restricted the individual. Benjamin Tucker, who tried to determine a scientific base for moral right or wrong, ultimately sided with the latter.

The Modern Schools, also called Ferrer Schools, were schools established in the United States in the early 20th century. They were modelled after the Escuela Moderna of Francisco Ferrer, the Catalan educator and anarchist. They were an important part of the anarchist, free schooling, socialist, and labour movements in the United States intending to educate the working classes from a secular, class-conscious perspective. The Modern Schools imparted daytime academic classes for children and nighttime continuing-education lectures for adults. The first and most notable of the Modern Schools was opened in New York City in 1911. Commonly called the Ferrer Center, it was founded by notable anarchists—including Leonard Abbott, Alexander Berkman, Voltairine de Cleyre and Emma Goldman. The school used Montessori methods and equipment, and emphasised academic freedom rather than fixed subjects, such as spelling and arithmetic.

=== In Europe and the arts ===
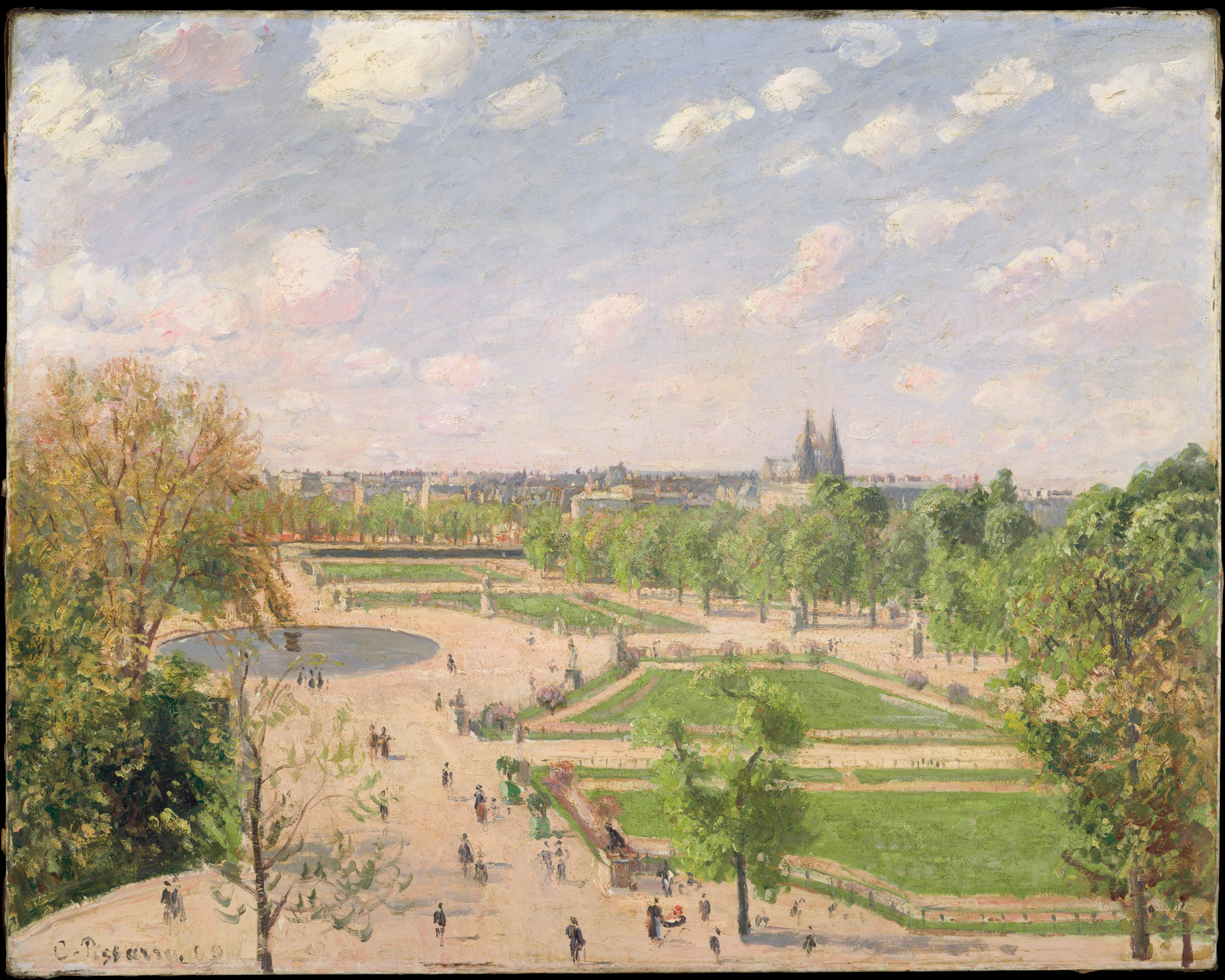
Anarchism's social theory paralleled neo-impressionist aesthetics (Pissarro's The Garden of the Tuileries on a Spring Morning pictured). Both currents favoured the harmonious blending of nature, physical laws, science and society as a synthesis of ideals and reality.

European individualist anarchism proceeded from the roots laid by William Godwin and Max Stirner. Many artists, poets and writers interested in freedom were exploring different aspects of anarchism. Anarcho-individualists were more interested in personal development, challenging the social norms and demanding sexual freedom rather than engaging in social struggles.

In France, an artistic and individualist trend in anarchism was shaping a new cultural movement at the turn of the century, with less of a social component and more of a personal rebellion against norms. Impressionists and neo-Impressionist painters were attracted by anarchism, most notably French Camille Pissarro. Modernist writers having anarchist tendencies, such as Henrik Ibsen and James Joyce, led to the impression that "modernism itself can be understood as the aesthetic realisation of anarchist politics". Dadaism arose from individualists aiming to use art to achieve total freedom. It influenced other currents such as surrealism, and proponents played a significant role in the Berlin rising of 1918. One of the main individualist anarchist journals in France, L'Anarchie, was established in 1905. A notable individualist was Stirnerist Émile Armand who was a defender of polyamory and homosexuality.

== Post-war ==
Following the end of the Spanish Civil War and World War II, the anarchist movement was a "ghost" of its former self, as proclaimed by anarchist historian George Woodcock. In his work Anarchism: A History of Libertarian Ideas and Movements published 1962, he wrote that after 1936 it was "a ghost that inspires neither fear among governments nor hope among peoples nor even interest among newspapermen". Capitalism continued to grow throughout the post-war period despite predictions from Marxist scholars that it would soon collapse under its own contradictions, yet anarchism gained a surprising surge in popular interest during the 1960s. Reasons for this were believed to be the gradual demystification of the Soviet Union and tensions at the climax of the Cold War. The New Left, which arose in the 1950s, was a libertarian socialist movement that was closer to anarchism. Prominent thinkers such as Herbert Marcuse and Wright Mills were critical of United States and Soviet Marxism.

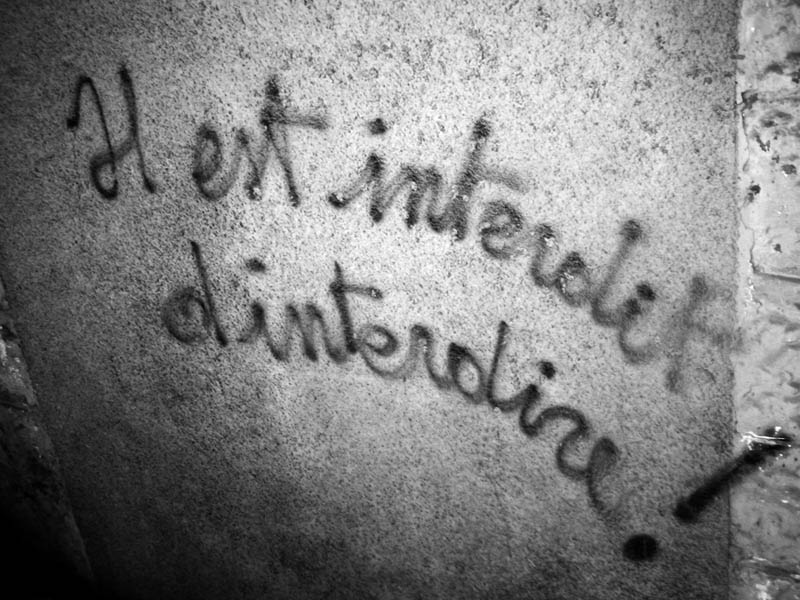
"Il est interdit d'interdire !" ("It is forbidden to forbid!"), a slogan on a wall in France, 1968. Many slogans criticising the establishment resonated with anarchist thought during the period of civil unrest in France. Other slogans included: Neither gods nor masters; The more you consume the less you live; All power to the imagination; Be realistic: demand the impossible.

In France, a wave of protests and demonstrations confronted the right-wing government of Charles de Gaulle in May 1968. Even though the anarchists had a minimal role, the events of May had a significant impact on anarchism. There were huge demonstrations with crowds in some places reaching one million participants. Strikes were called in many major cities and towns involving seven million workers—all grassroots, bottom-up and spontaneously organised. Various committees were formed at universities, lyceums, and in neighbourhoods, mostly having anti-authoritarian tendencies. Slogans that resonated with libertarian ideas were prominent such as: "I take my desires for reality, because I believe in the reality of my desires." Even though the spirit of the events leaned mostly towards libertarian communism, some authors draw a connection to anarchism. The wave of protests eased when a 10% pay raise was granted and national elections were proclaimed. The paving stones of Paris were only covering some reformist victories. Nevertheless, the 1968 events inspired a new confidence in anarchism as workers' management, self-determination, grassroots democracy, antiauthoritarianism, and spontaneity became relevant once more. After decades of pessimism 1968 marked the revival of anarchism, either as a distinct ideology or as a part of other social movements.

Originally founded in 1957, The Situationist International rose to prominence during events of 1968 with the principal argument that life had turned into a "spectacle" because of the corrosive effect of capitalism. They later dissolved in 1972. The late 1960s saw the flourish of anarcha-feminism. It attacked the state, capitalism and patriarchy and was organized in a decentralised manner. Black anarchism began to take form at this time and influenced anarchism's move from a Eurocentric demographic.

As the ecological crisis was becoming a greater threat to the planet, Murray Bookchin developed a new wave of anarchist thought. In his social ecology theory, he argues that certain social practices and priorities threaten life on Earth. He goes further to identify the cause of such practises as social oppressions. He proposed libertarian municipalism, the involvement of people in political struggles in decentralized federated villages or towns.

=== Contemporary anarchism ===
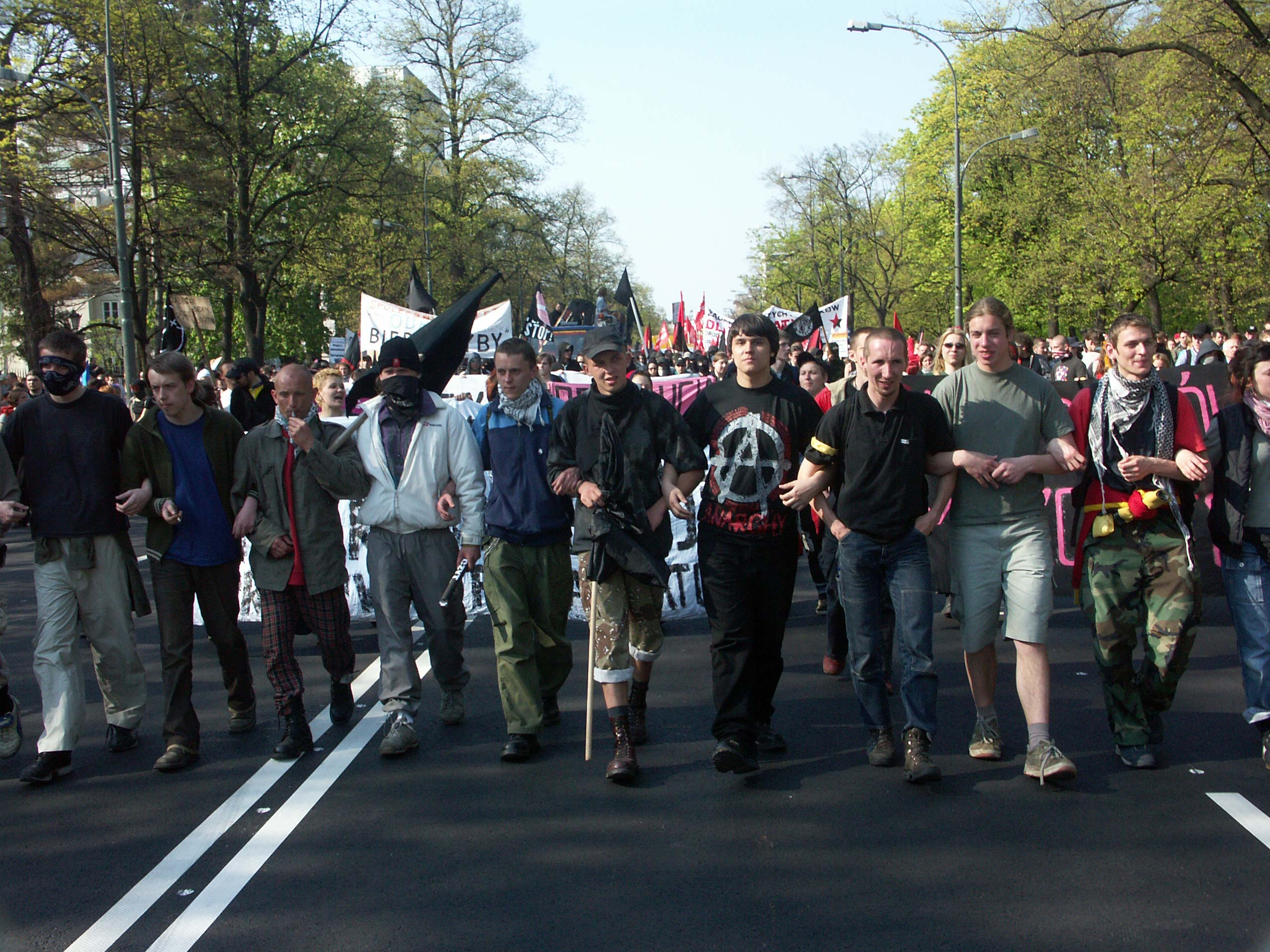
Anarchism has been a vital part of the anti-globalization movement. Here a block marches in Warsaw, 2004.

The anthropology of anarchism has changed in the contemporary era as the traditional lines or ideas of the 19th century have been abandoned. Most anarchists are now younger activists informed with feminist and ecological concerns. They are involved in counterculture, Black Power, creating temporary autonomous zones, and events such as Carnival Against Capital. These movements are not anarchist, but rather anarchistic.

Mexico saw another uprising at the turn of the 21st century. Zapatistas took control of a large area in Chiapas. They were organised in an autonomous, self-governing model that has many parallels to anarchism, inspiring many young anarchists in the West. Another stateless region that has been associated with anarchism is the Kurdish area of Rojava in northern Syria. The conflict there emerged during the Syrian Civil War and Rojava's decentralized model is founded upon Bookchin's ideas of libertarian municipalism and social ecology within a secular framework and ethnic diversity. Chiapas and Rojava share the same goal, to create a libertarian community despite being surrounded by state apparatus.

Anarchism grew in popularity and influence as part of the anti-war, anti-capitalist, and anti-globalisation movements. Maia Ramnath described those social movements that employ the anarchist framework (leaderless, direct democracy) but do not call themselves anarchists as anarchists with a lowercase a while describing more traditional forms of anarchism with a capital A. Anarchists became known for their involvement in protests against meetings such as the World Trade Organization in Seattle in 1999, Group of Eight in 2001 and the World Economic Forum, as part of anti-globalisation movement. Some anarchist factions at these protests engaged in rioting, property destruction, and violent confrontations with police. These actions were precipitated by ad hoc, leaderless, anonymous cadres known as black blocs. Other organisational tactics pioneered during this period include security culture, affinity groups and the use of decentralised technologies such as the Internet. Occupy Wall Street movement had roots in anarchist philosophy.

According to anarchist scholar Simon Critchley, "contemporary anarchism can be seen as a powerful critique of the pseudo-libertarianism of contemporary neo-liberalism [...] One might say that contemporary anarchism is about responsibility, whether sexual, ecological, or socio-economic; it flows from an experience of conscience about the manifold ways in which the West ravages the rest; it is an ethical outrage at the yawning inequality, impoverishment, and disenfranchisement that is so palpable locally and globally". While having revolutionary aspirations, many contemporary forms of anarchism are not confrontational. Instead, they are trying to build an alternative way of social organization (following the theories of dual power), based on mutual interdependence and voluntary cooperation, for instance in groups such as Food Not Bombs and in self-managed social centers. Scholar Carissa Honeywell takes the example of Food Not Bombs group of collectives, to highlight some features of how contemporary anarchist groups work: direct action, working together and in solidarity with those left behind. While doing so, Food Not Bombs provides consciousness raising about the rising rates of world hunger and suggest policies to tackle hunger, ranging from de-funding the arms industry to addressing Monsanto seed-saving policies and patents, helping farmers, and resisting the commodification of food and housing. Honeywell also emphasizes that contemporary anarchists are interested in the flourishing not only of humans, but non-humans and the environment as well. Honeywell argues that their analysis of capitalism and governments results in anarchists rejecting representative democracy and the state as a whole.

== Sources ==
=== Secondary sources (books and journals) ===
- Adams, Ian (2001). Political Ideology Today. Manchester University Press. ISBN 978-0-7190-3347-6.
- Anderson, Benedict (July–August 2004). "In the world-shadow of Bismarck and Nobel". New Left Review. II (28).
- Avrich, Paul (April 1970). "The Legacy of Bakunin". The Russian Review. 29 (2): 129–142. doi:10.2307/127358. JSTOR 127358. S2CID 159947322.
- Avrich, Paul (1982). "Rev. of Reinventing Anarchy". Labor History. 23: 440. doi:10.1080/00236568208584667. ISSN 0023-656X. ProQuest 1312149271.
- Avrich, Paul (1984). The Haymarket Tragedy. Princeton: Princeton University Press. ISBN 978-0-691-00600-0.
- Avrich, Paul (2005). Anarchist Voices: An Oral History of Anarchism in America. Princeton University Press. ISBN 978-0-691-04494-1.
- Avrich, Paul (2006). The Russian Anarchists. Stirling: AK Press. ISBN 978-1-904859-48-2.
- Barclay, Harold B. (1990). People without government: an anthropology of anarchy. Kahn & Averill. ISBN 978-1-871082-16-6.
- Bakunin, Mikhail (1991) [1873]. Statism and Anarchy. Cambridge University Press. ISBN 978-0-521-36973-2.
- Bantman, Constance (2019). "The Era of Propaganda by the Deed". In Levy, Carl; Adams, Matthew S. (eds.). The Palgrave Handbook of Anarchism. Springer Publishing. ISBN 978-3-319-75620-2.
- Beevor, Antony (2006). The Battle for Spain: The Spanish Civil War 1936–1939. London: Weidenfeld & Nicolson. ISBN 978-0-297-84832-5.
- Berry, David (1999). "'Fascism or Revolution!' Anarchism and Antifascism in France, 1933-39". Contemporary European History. 8 (1): 51–71. doi:10.1017/S0960777399000132. JSTOR 20081690. S2CID 145130553.
- Berry, David (2019). "Anarchism and 1968". In Levy, Carl; Adams, Matthew S. (eds.). The Palgrave Handbook of Anarchism. Springer. ISBN 978-3-319-75620-2.
- Billington, James H. (1999). Fire in the Minds of Men: Origins of the Revolutionary Faith. Transaction Publishers. ISBN 978-1-4128-1401-0.
- Birchall, Ian (2004). Sartre Against Stalinism. Berghahn Books. ISBN 978-1-57181-542-2.
- Bolloten, Burnett (1984). The Spanish Civil War: Revolution and Counterrevolution. University of North Carolina Press. ISBN 978-0-8078-1906-7.
- Bookchin, Murray (1995). "2. Individualist Anarchism and Reaction". Social Anarchism Or Lifestyle Anarchism: An Unbridgeable Chasm. AK Press. ISBN 978-1-873176-83-2.
- Carlson, Andrew (1972). "Philosophical Egoism: German Antecedents". Anarchism in Germany. Metuchen: Scarecrow Press. ISBN 978-0-8108-0484-5.
- Conversi, Daniele (9 May 2016). "Anarchism, Modernism, and Nationalism: Futurism's French Connections, 1876–1915". The European Legacy. 21 (8). Informa UK Limited: 791–811. doi:10.1080/10848770.2016.1180864. ISSN 1084-8770. S2CID 148353911.
- Cornell, Andrew (2016). Unruly Equality: U.S. Anarchism in the Twentieth Century. University of California Press. ISBN 978-0-520-96184-5.
- Critchley, Simon (2013). Infinitely Demanding: Ethics of Commitment, Politics of Resistance. Verso Books. ISBN 978-1-78168-017-9.
- Crone, Patricia (2000). "Ninth-Century Muslim Anarchists" (PDF). Past & Present (167): 3–28. doi:10.1093/past/167.1.3. Archived from the original (PDF) on 28 August 2020.
- D'Agostino, Anthony (2019). "Anarchism and Marxism in the Russian Revolution". In Levy, Carl; Adams, Matthew S. (eds.). The Palgrave Handbook of Anarchism. Springer. ISBN 978-3-319-75620-2.
- de Acosta, Alejandro (2009). "Two undecidable questions for thinking in which anything goes". In Randall Amster (ed.). Contemporary Anarchist Studies: An Introductory Anthology of Anarchy in the Academy. Luis Fernandez, Abraham DeLeon. Routledge. ISBN 978-0-415-47402-3.
- Dirlik, Arif (1991). Anarchism in the Chinese Revolution. Berkeley: University of California Press. ISBN 978-0-520-07297-8.
- Dirlik, Arif (2010). "Anarchism and the Question of Place: Thoughts from the Chinese experience". In Steven Hirsch; Lucien van der Walt (eds.). Anarchism and Syndicalism in the Colonial and Postcolonial World, 1870–1940. Brill Publishers. ISBN 978-9004188488.
- Dodson, Edward (2002). The Discovery of First Principles: Volume 2. AuthorHouse. p. 312. ISBN 978-0-595-24912-1.
- Dupuis-Déri, Francis (2019). "From the Zapatistas to Seattle: The 'New Anarchists'". In Levy, Carl; Adams, Matthew S. (eds.). The Palgrave Handbook of Anarchism. Springer. ISBN 978-3-319-75620-2.
- Edwards, Stewart (1969). Selected Writings of Pierre-Joseph Proudhon. Anchor Books. ISBN 9780598059338.
- Engel, Barbara (2000). Mothers and Daughters. Evanston: Northwestern University Press. p. 140. ISBN 978-0-8101-1740-2.
- Evren, Süreyyya; Kinna, Ruth (2015). "George Woodcock: The Ghost Writer of Anarchism". Anarchist Studies. 23 (1).
- Fiala, Andrew (2013). "Political Skepticism and Anarchist Themes in the American Tradition". European Journal of Pragmatism and American Philosophy. V-2 (2). doi:10.4000/ejpap.545.
- Firth, Rhiannon (2019). "Utopianism and Intentional Communities". In Levy, Carl; Adams, Matthew S. (eds.). The Palgrave Handbook of Anarchism. Springer. ISBN 978-3-319-75620-2.
- Foner, Philip Sheldon (1986). May day: a short history of the international workers' holiday, 1886–1986. New York: International Publishers. ISBN 978-0-7178-0624-9.
- Goldman, Emma (2003). "Preface". My Disillusionment in Russia. New York: Dover Publications. p. xx. ISBN 978-0-486-43270-0.
- Goodway, David (2006). Anarchist Seeds Beneath the Snow: Left-Libertarian Thought and British Writers from William Morris to Colin Ward. PM Press. ISBN 978-1-60486-221-8.
- Goodway, David (2013). For Anarchism (RLE Anarchy). Routledge. ISBN 978-1-135-03756-7.
- Graeber, David; Grubacic, Andrej (2004). "Anarchism, Or The Revolutionary Movement Of The Twenty-first Century". Znet. Archived from the original on 17 March 2008.
- Graham, Robert (2005). "Preface". Anarchism: A Documentary History of Libertarian Ideas. Montréal: Black Rose Books. ISBN 978-1-55164-250-5.
- Graham, Robert (2019). "Anarchism and the First International". In Levy, Carl; Adams, Matthew S. (eds.). The Palgrave Handbook of Anarchism. Springer. ISBN 978-3-319-75620-2.
- Holborow, Marnie (9 November 2002). "Daring But Divided (Reviews & Culture)". Socialist Worker. No. 268. Archived from the original on 29 July 2013.
- Honeywell, C. (2021). Anarchism. Key Concepts in Political Theory. Wiley. ISBN 978-1-5095-2390-0.
- Ivianski, Zeev (1988). "Source of Inspiration for Revolutionary Terrorism — The Bakunin — Nechayev Alliance". Journal of Conflict Studies. 8 (3): 49–68.
- Joll, James (1975). The Anarchists (Greek ed.). Επίκουρος. ISBN 9780674036413.
- Jun, Nathan J.; Wahl, Shane (2010). New Perspectives on Anarchism. Rowman & Littlefield. ISBN 978-0-7391-3241-8.
- Hutton, John G. (2004). Neo-Impressionism and the Search for Solid Ground: Art, Science, and Anarchism in Fin-de-siecle France. Baton Rouge, Louisiana: Louisiana State University Press. ISBN 978-0-8071-1823-8.
- Katz, Jonothan (1976). Gay American History. The Hearst Corporation. ISBN 978-0-380-40550-3.
- Kinna, Ruth; Prichard, Alex (2009). "Anarchism Past, present, and utopia". In Randall Amster (ed.). Contemporary Anarchist Studies: An Introductory Anthology of Anarchy in the Academy. Luis Fernandez, Abraham DeLeon. Routledge. ISBN 978-0-415-47402-3.
- Laursen, Ole Birk (2019). "Anti-Imperialism". In Levy, Carl; Adams, Matthew S. (eds.). The Palgrave Handbook of Anarchism. Springer. ISBN 978-3-319-75620-2.
- Levy, Carl (2004). "Anarchism, Internationalism and Nationalism in Europe, 1860–1939". Australian Journal of Politics and History. 50 (3): 330–342. doi:10.1111/j.1467-8497.2004.00337.x.
- Levy, Carl (Fall 2010). "Social Histories of Anarchism". Journal for the Study of Radicalism. 4 (2): 1–44. doi:10.1353/jsr.2010.0003. ISSN 1930-1197. S2CID 144317650. Project MUSE 431497. ProQuest 863638100.
- Levy, Carl; Newman, Saul, eds. (2019). The Anarchist Imagination: Anarchism Encounters the Humanities and the Social Sciences. Interventions. Routledge. ISBN 978-1-138-78276-1.
- Long, Roderick T. (2013). Gerald F. Gaus; Fred D'Agostino (eds.). The Routledge Companion to Social and Political Philosophy. Routledge. ISBN 978-0-415-87456-4.
- Marshall, Peter H. (1993). Demanding the Impossible: A History of Anarchism. Fontana. ISBN 978-0-00-686245-1.
- Mbah, Sam; Igariwey, I. E. (1997). African Anarchism: The History of a Movement. See Sharp Press. ISBN 978-1-884365-05-8.
- McElroy, Wendy (2003). "The Debates of Liberty: An Overview of Individualist Anarchism, 1881–1908". Literature of Liberty: A Review of Contemporary Liberal Thought. Lexington Books. ISBN 9780739104736.
- McKinley, C. Alexander (2019). "The French Revolution and 1848". In Levy, Carl; Adams, Matthew S. (eds.). The Palgrave Handbook of Anarchism. Springer. ISBN 978-3-319-75620-2.
- McLaughlin, Paul (2007). Anarchism and Authority: A Philosophical Introduction to Classical Anarchism. Routledge. ISBN 978-1-317-18151-4.
- Montgomery, Robert H. (1960). Sacco-Vanzetti: The Murder and the Myth. New York: Devin-Adair.
- Moya, Jose C (2015). "Transference, culture, and critique The Circulation of Anarchist Ideas and Practices". In Geoffroy de Laforcade (ed.). In Defiance of Boundaries: Anarchism in Latin American History. Kirwin R. Shaffer. University Press of Florida. ISBN 978-0-8130-5138-3.
- Nettlau, Max (1996). A Short History of Anarchism. Freedom Press. ISBN 978-0-900384-89-9.
- Nomad, Max (1966). "The Anarchist Tradition". In Drachkovitch, Milorad M. (ed.). Revolutionary Internationals 1864 1943. Stanford University Press. p. 88. ISBN 978-0-8047-0293-5.
- Ossar, Michael (1980). Anarchism in the Dramas of Ernst Toller: The Realm of Necessity and the Realm of Freedom. SUNY Press. ISBN 978-0-87395-393-1.
- Pengam, Alain (1987). "Anarchist-Communism". In Rubel Maximilien; Crump John (eds.). Non-Market Socialism in the Nineteenth and Twentieth Centuries. St. Martin's Press. ISBN 978-0312005245.
- Pernicone, Nunzio (2016). Italian Anarchism, 1864-1892. Princeton University Press. ISBN 978-0-691-63268-1.
- Pugliese, Stanislao G. (13 January 2004). Fascism, Anti-Fascism, and the Resistance in Italy: 1919 to the Present. Rowman & Littlefield Publishers. ISBN 978-0-7425-7971-2.
- Ramnath, Maia (2019). "Non-Western Anarchisms and Postcolonialism". In Levy, Carl; Adams, Matthew S. (eds.). The Palgrave Handbook of Anarchism. Springer. ISBN 978-3-319-75620-2.
- Rapp, John A. (9 August 2012). Daoism and Anarchism: Critiques of State Autonomy in Ancient and Modern China. A&C Black. ISBN 978-1-4411-3223-9.
- Roslak, Robyn S. (1991). "The Politics of Aesthetic Harmony: Neo-Impressionism, Science, and Anarchism". The Art Bulletin. 73 (3). JSTOR: 381–390. doi:10.2307/3045811. ISSN 0004-3079. JSTOR 3045811.
- Ross, Carne (2019). "Preface". In Levy, Carl; Adams, Matthew S. (eds.). The Palgrave Handbook of Anarchism. Springer. ISBN 978-3-319-75620-2.
- Rupert, Mark (2006). Globalization and International Political Economy. Lanham: Rowman & Littlefield Publishers. p. 66. ISBN 978-0-7425-2943-4.
- Ryley, Constance (2019). "Individualism". In Levy, Carl; Adams, Matthew S. (eds.). The Palgrave Handbook of Anarchism. Springer. ISBN 978-3-319-75620-2.
- Schofield, Malcolm (July 1999). The Stoic Idea of the City. University of Chicago Press. ISBN 978-0-226-74006-5.
- Sheehan, Seán (2003). Anarchism. Reaktion Books. ISBN 978-1-86189-169-3.
- Skirda, Alexandre (2002). Facing the Enemy: A History of Anarchist Organization from Proudhon to May 1968. AK Press in conjunction with Kate Sharpley Library. ISBN 978-1-902593-19-7.
- Schmidt, Michael; van der Walt, Lucien (2009). "Still fanning the flames: An interview with Michael Schmidt and Lucien van der Walt - Revolution by the Book : The AK Press Blog". revolutionbythebook.akpress.org. Archived from the original on 21 December 2009.
- Thomas, Paul (1985). Karl Marx and the Anarchists. London: Routledge/Kegan Paul. p. 142. ISBN 978-0-7102-0685-5.
- Thomas, Hugh (2001). The Spanish Civil War. London: Penguin Books. ISBN 978-0-14-101161-5.
- Turcato, Davide (2019). "Anarchist Communism". In Levy, Carl; Adams, Matthew S. (eds.). The Palgrave Handbook of Anarchism. Springer. ISBN 978-3-319-75620-2.
- Wilbur, Shawn P. (2019). "The Spanish Civil War". In Levy, Carl; Adams, Matthew S. (eds.). The Palgrave Handbook of Anarchism (PDF). Cham: Palgrave Macmillan. pp. 429–448. doi:10.1007/978-3-319-75620-2_25. ISBN 978-3-319-75619-6. S2CID 157359096.
- Williams, Dana M. (2015). "Black Panther Radical Factionalization and the Development of Black Anarchism". Journal of Black Studies. 46 (7). Thousand Oaks: SAGE Publishing: 678–703. doi:10.1177/0021934715593053. JSTOR 24572914. S2CID 145663405.
- Woodcock, George (1962). Anarchism: A History of Libertarian Ideas and Movements. Melbourne: Penguin.
- Yeoman, James Michael (2019). "The Spanish Civil War". In Levy, Carl; Adams, Matthew S. (eds.). The Palgrave Handbook of Anarchism (PDF). Cham: Palgrave Macmillan. pp. 429–448. doi:10.1007/978-3-319-75620-2_25. ISBN 978-3-319-75619-6. S2CID 157359096.
- Zimmer, Kenyon (2019). "Haymarket and the Rise of Syndicalism". In Levy, Carl; Adams, Matthew S. (eds.). The Palgrave Handbook of Anarchism. Springer. ISBN 978-3-319-75620-2.

=== Tertiary sources (encyclopedias and dictionaries) ===
- Fiala, Andrew (3 October 2017). "Anarchism". In Zalta, Edward N. (ed.). Stanford Encyclopedia of Philosophy. ISSN 1095-5054. OCLC 429049174.
- Forman, Michael (13 April 2009). Immanuel Ness (ed.). The International Encyclopedia of Revolution and Protest, 8 Volume Set: 1500 to the Present. Wiley. ISBN 978-1-4051-8464-9.
- Lehning, Arthur (2003). "Anarchism". Dictionary of the History of Ideas. Archived from the original on 9 September 2006.
- Leopold, David (2015). "Max Stirner". In Zalta, Edward N. (ed.). Stanford Encyclopedia of Philosophy. ISSN 1095-5054. OCLC 429049174.
- Miller, Martin A.; Woodcock, George; Dirlik, Arif; Rosemont, Franklin (14 September 2018). "Anarchism". Encyclopedia Britannica. Archived from the original on 14 September 2018. The current version of Anarchism in Britanicca
- Miller, David (1991). The Blackwell Encyclopaedia of Political Thought. Wiley. ISBN 978-0-631-17944-3.
- Philip, Mark (20 May 2006). "William Godwin". In Zalta, Edward N. (ed.). Stanford Encyclopedia of Philosophy. ISSN 1095-5054. OCLC 429049174.
