= Carl Levy (political scientist) =

Professor of politics

Carl Levy is professor of politics at Goldsmiths College, University of London. He is a specialist in the history of modern Italy and the theory and history of anarchism.

== Education ==
Levy was educated at the State University of New York at Buffalo (BA) and the London School of Economics (MA and PhD).

== Career ==
Levy is professor of politics at Goldsmiths College, University of London. He is a specialist in the history of modern Italy and the theory and history of anarchism. In addition to Goldsmiths, Levy has held positions at Queen Mary Westfield College, the University of Kent at Canterbury and the Open University.

== Publications ==
=== Books ===
- Levy, Carl. 2019. Conclusion in Three Acts: False Genealogies and Suspect Methodologies. In: Carl Levy and Saul Newman, eds. The Anarchist Imagination: Anarchism Encounters the Humanities and the Social Sciences. Abingdon: Routledge, pp. 240–258. ISBN 9781138781184
- Levy, Carl. 2019. Introduction: Anarchism encounters the humanities and the social sciences. In: Carl Levy and Saul Newman, eds. The Anarchist Imagination: Anarchism Encounters the Humanities and the Social Sciences. Abingdon: Routledge, pp. 1–29. ISBN 9781138781184
- Newman, Saul. 2019. Postanarchism Today: Postanarchism and Political Theory. In: Carl Levy and Saul Newman, eds. The Anarchist Imagination: Anarchism Encounters the Humanities and Social Sciences. Abingdon: Routledge. ISBN 9781138781184
- Newman, Saul. 2018. Postanarchism. In: Carl Levy and M Adams, eds. The Palgrave Handbook of Anarchism. London: Palgrave. ISBN 978-3-319-75619-6
- Levy, Carl. 2018. Anarchism and Cosmopolitanism. In: Carl Levy and Matthew Adams, eds. The Palgrave Handbook of Anarchism. London and New York: Palgrave Macmillan, pp. 125–148. ISBN 978-3-319-75619-6
- Levy, Carl and Adams, Matthew. 2018. Introduction. In: Carl Levy and Matthew Adams, eds. The Palgrave Handbook of Anarchism. London and New York: Palgrave Macmillan, pp. 1–23. ISBN 978-3-319-75619-6
- Levy, Carl. 2018. Anarchists and the city: Governance, revolution and the imagination. In: Federico Ferretti; Geronimo Barrera de la Torre; Anthony Ince and Francisco Toro, eds. Historical Geographies of Anarchism. Early Critical Geographers and Present-Day Scientific Challenges. London: Routledge, pp. 7–24. ISBN 978-1-138-23424-6
- Levy, Carl. 2018. 'The Italians and the IWMA'. In: "Arise Ye Wretched of the Earth". The First International in Global Perspective. 29 The Hague: Brill, pp. 207–220. ISBN 978-900-4335-455
- Levy, Carl. 2017. Malatesta and the War Interventionist Debate 1914-1917: from the Red Week to the Russian Revolutions. In: Matthew Adams and Ruth Kinna, eds. Anarchism 1914–1918. Internationalism, Anti-Militarism and War. Manchester: Manchester University Press, pp. 69–94. ISBN 9781784993412
- Levy, Carl. 2017. Antonio Gramsci, der Anarchismus, der Syndikalismus und der sovversivismo. In: Phillippe Kellermann, ed. Ne Znam Zeitschrift fur Anarchismusforschung. 4 Berlin: Verlag Edition AV, pp. 98–130. ISBN 978-3-86841-178-2
- Levy, Carl. 2016. Conclusion: Historiography and the new class. In: Carl Levy, ed. Socialism and the Intelligentsia 1880–1914. London: Routledge, pp. 271–290. ISBN 978-1-138-68080-7
- Levy, Carl. 2016. Education and self-education: staffing the early ILP. In: Carl Levy, ed. Socialism and the Intelligentsia 1880–1914. London: Routledge, pp. 135–210. ISBN 978-1-138-68080-7
- Levy, Carl. 2016. Introduction: historical and theoretical themes. In: Carl Levy, ed. Socialism and the Intelligentsia 1880–1914. London: Routledge, pp. 1–34. ISBN 978-1-138-68080-7
- Levy, Carl. 2015. Da Bresci a Wormwood Scrubs: Il "capo" dell'anarchismo mondiale a Londra". In: Davide Turcato, ed. Errico Malatesta, "Lo Sciopero Armato". Il lungo esilio londinese 1900–1913. Opere Complete, Vol. 5. Milan: Zero in Condotta, XV-XXX. ISBN 978-88-95950-38-9
- Levy, Carl. 2015. 'Forward'. In: Vernon Richards, ed. Malatesta. Life and Ideas. The Anarchist Writings of Errico Malatesta. Oakland, CA: PM Press, v-xvi. ISBN 978-1-62963-032-8
- Levy, Carl. 2015. 'Racism, Immigration and New Identities in Italy'. In: A. Mammone; E. G. Parini and G. A. Veltri, eds. Routledge Handbook of Contemporary Italy. London: Routledge, pp. 49–63. ISBN 978-0415-60417-8
- Levy, Carl. 2014. 'Anarchist Anti-Communism'. In: Kevin Morgan, ed. Twentieth Century Communism. London: Lawrence and Wishart, pp. 24–32. ISBN 978-1909831-056
- Levy, Carl. 2013. The Othering of Italy: Postmodern Approaches to the Study of Racism in Italy. In: David Forgacs, ed. Language, Space, and Otherness in Italy since 1861. Cambridge: Cambridge University Press, /-/. ISBN /
- Levy, Carl. 2012. Antonio Gramsci, Anarchism Syndicalism and Sovversivismo. In: D Berry; R Kinna; S Pinta and A Prichard, eds. Politics in Red and Black: 20th Century Libertarian Socialism. Basingstoke: Palgrave Macmillan, /-/. ISBN /
- Levy, Carl. 2012. Errico Malatesta and Charismatic Leadership. In: J-W Stutje, ed. Charisma and Emergent Social Movements. Oxford/New York: Berghahn, /-/. ISBN 978-085745-329-7
- Levy, Carl. 2011. "Into the Zone”: The European Union and Extra-Territorial Processing for Migrants, Refugees and Asylum Seekers: Policy Discussions 2001–2005. In: F Demier and E Musiani, eds. La démocratie européenne à l’épreuve des changements économiques et sociaux, XIXe-XX siècle. Bologna: Bonomia University Press, pp. 207–222. ISBN 978-88-7395-702-7
- Levy, Carl. 2010. The Rooted Cosmopolitan: Errico Malatesta, Sydnicalism, Transnationalism and the International Labour Movement’. In: D. Berry and C. Bantman, eds. Perspectives on Anarchism, Labour & Syndicalism: The Individual, the National and the Transnational. Newcastle: Cambridge Scholar Press, pp. 61–79. ISBN 978-1-4438-2393-7
- Levy, Carl. 2009. Malatesta, Errico. In: I Ness, ed. International Encyclopedia of Revolution and Protest. Oxford: Blackwell, pp. 2168–2171. ISBN 978-1405184649
- Levy, Carl. 2006. Intellectual Unemployment and Political Radicalism in Italy, 1968–1982. In: Anna Cento Bull and Adalgisa Giorgio, eds. Speaking Out and Silencing: Culture, Society and Politics in Italy in the 1970s. Legenda, pp. 132–145. ISBN 9781904350729
