= Harold Barclay =

American educator (1924–2017)

- Born: Harold Barton Barclay; January 3, 1924; Newton, Massachusetts, United States
- Died: December 20, 2017 (aged 93); Vernon, British Columbia, Canada

Academic background
- Education: Stockbridge School of Agriculture
- Alma mater: Cornell University
- Thesis: Buurri al Lamaab: A Suburban Village in the Sudan (1961)
- Influences: Ruth Benedict

Academic work
- Discipline: Anthropology
- Sub-discipline: Political anthropology
- Institutions: University of Alberta
- Main interests: Anarchism

Harold B. Barclay (January 3, 1924 – 20 December 2017) was a professor emeritus in anthropology at the University of Alberta, Edmonton, Alberta. His research focused on rural society in modern Egypt and the northern Arab Sudan, political anthropology and the anthropology of religion. He is also commonly acknowledged as a notable writer in anarchist theory, specialising in theories involving the structure and oppressive systems of the state and how society would operate without a formal government.

== Select bibliography ==
1. Buurri al Lamaab, is a suburban village in Sudan. Cornell studies in anthropology. Ithaca, N.Y.: Cornell University Press, 1964.
2. The role of the horse in man's culture. London: J.A. Allen, 1980. ISBN 0-85131-329-9
3. Culture: the human way. Calgary. Alta., Canada: Western Publishers, 1986. ISBN 0-919119-11-5
4. Anthropology and Anarchism. Cambridge: the Anarchist Encyclopaedia, 1986.
5. People without Government: An Anthropology of Anarchy, rev. ed., Seattle: Left Bank Books, 1990. ISBN 0-939306-09-3.
6. Culture and anarchism. London: Freedom Press, 1997. ISBN 0-900384-84-0
7. The state. London: Freedom Press, 2003. ISBN 1-904491-00-6
8. Longing for Arcadia: memoirs of an anarcho-cynicalist anthropologist. Victoria, B.C.: Trafford, 2005. ISBN 1-4120-5679-9
