= Claude Fischler =

French social scientist

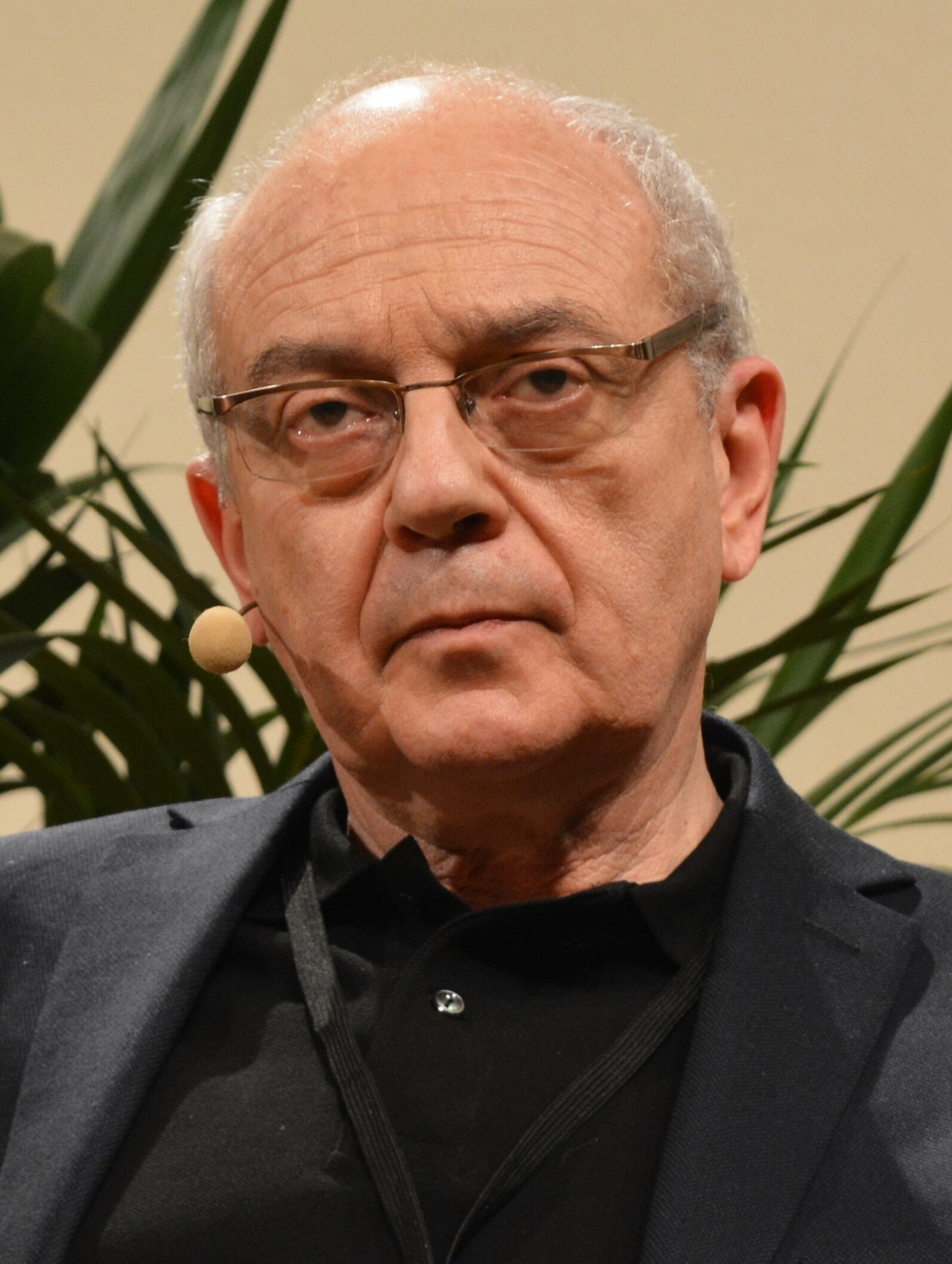
- Born: 1947 (age 77–78)
- Citizenship: French
- Scientific career
- Fields: Sociology and anthropology
- Website: www.fischler.fr

Claude Fischler (born 1947) is a French social scientist (sociology, anthropology). He is a directeur de recherche of the French National Centre for Scientific Research and heads the Institut Interdisciplinaire d'Anthropologie du Contemporain (Interdisciplinary Institute for Contemporary Anthropology), a research unit of the School for Advanced Studies in the Social Sciences, in Paris.

== Research topics ==
Claude Fischler's main area of research has been a comparative, interdisciplinary social science perspective on food and nutrition. His work covers the structure and function of cuisines, tastes and preferences and their evolution and change over time and space, as well as body image.

Subsequently, he came to focus on perception of risk, scares and crises, on comparative approaches of attitudes toward food and health across cultures (in relation to, among other things, prevalence of obesity), on the reception and perception of sensitive technologies (including novel foods) and more recently on assessment and measurement of well-being and quality of life in a comparative perspective.

His main current research is on commensality - eating together - its forms and functions, and its possible impact on public health. The anthropology of commensality ties into the general issue of sharing food, at the local and global levels.

== Activities ==
Claude Fischler served on the Scientific Committee and the Expert Committee on Human Nutrition of the French Agency for Food Safety (AFFSA) and on its board of directors. He has been a member of the steering committee of the French National Program on Nutrition and Health.

He has also been a member on the executive committee of the European Sociological Association.

He serves on the Strategic Committee on Sustainable Agriculture and Development advising the French Minister of Food and Agriculture and also on the Advisory Group on Risk Communication of the European Food Safety Authority.

== Bibliography ==
=== Books as main author ===
- (in French) Le Retour des astrologues. Diagnostic sociologique, Paris, Club de l'Obs, 1971.

Reviewed in Archives de sociologie des religions17:34 (1972), pp. 183-184.

- (in French) La Croyance astrologique moderne : Diagnostic sociologique, with Edgar Morin & al., Lausanne, L'Age d'homme, 1981.
- (in French) La Damnation de Fos, with Bernard Paillard, Paris, Le Seuil, 1981.
- (in French) L'Homme et la Table, Paris, École des hautes études en sciences sociales, 1990.
- (in French) L'Homnivore. Le goût, la cuisine et le corps, Paris, Odile Jacob, 1990.

Awarded a prize by the Académie des Sciences Morales et Politiques.
Reprinted in 1991, 2001, 2010.

- (in French) Du Vin, Paris, Odile Jacob, 1999.
- (in French) Manger. Français, Européens et Américains face à l'alimentation, with Estelle Masson, Paris, Odile Jacob, 2008.

=== Books as editor ===
- (in French) La nourriture - pour une anthropologie bioculturelle de l'alimentation, Communications 31, 1979.
- (in French) Manger magique », Paris, Autrement, n°149, 1994.
- (in French) Pensée magique et alimentation aujourd'hui, Cahiers de l'OCHA 5, 1996.
- (in French) Les alimentations particulières : Mangerons-nous encore ensemble demain ?, Paris, Odile Jacob, 2013.

=== Works in English ===
- "Food, Self and Identity", Social Science Information 27:2 (1988), pp. 275–292.
- "Food Selection and Risk Perception"
- "Commensality, Society, and Culture", Social Science Information 50(3–4) (2011), pp. 528–548.
