= Paris International Model United Nations =

- Abbreviation: PIMUN
- Formation: 2008
- Type: NGO
- Purpose: Education
- Location: Paris, France
- Official language: English, French
- Secretary General: Servan Gil
- Main organ: Secretariat
- Website: cinup.fr/pimun

The Paris International Model United Nations (PIMUN) is an annual model United Nations (MUN) conference taking place in Paris, France. It is run by the students of 18 Parisian universities belonging to the Paris Intercollegiate United Nations Committee (CINUP) represented by a Presidency of CINUP and a Secretary of PIMUN. While PIMUN organizers indicate that it was formed in 2011, some evidence links its foundation to 2008, making it the oldest MUN conference in France. The participants of the conference are university students looking to debate and negotiate about international affairs and diplomacy.

== History ==
The origins of PIMUN can be traced back to Sciences Po MUN 2007, the first documented instance of a Model United Nations conference in France. Held at Sciences Po in Paris in February 2007, the first conference simulated four committees. After the 2007 conference, in an interview given to the student newspaper of the university, the Secretary General of the conference first referred to the upcoming 2008 edition as the Paris International Model United Nations. The conference was held under the name of PIMUN at Sciences Po in 2008, 2009, 2010, and 2011. Officially, the conference claims to have existed since 2011.

In 2012, the organizing team was enlarged to students from the Pantheon-Sorbonne University, and the Panthéon-Assas University, and the conference was hosted at the UNESCO headquarters. In 2013, students from HEC Paris, the Ecole polytechnique, the ENS, INALCO, ESCP Europe and ESSEC Business School joined the organizing team. Students from Paris-Panthéon-Assas University, Paris 1 Panthéon-Sorbonne University, Paris Dauphine University, the Catholic University of Paris, HEIP, ILERI and Sorbonne Nouvelle University were amongst the organizing team for the 2025 edition.

For its 2024 edition, the conference was under the High Patronage of Mr Emmanuel Macron, President of the French Republic, under the patronage of the French United Nations Association, and under the Patronage of the French Commission for the UNESCO.

== Structure and conference ==
PIMUN primarily simulates committees of the United Nations. Similar to other conferences in Europe and in the world, it features the subcommittees of the United Nations General Assembly, the United Nations Security Council, ECOSOC committees and other agencies or institutions belonging to the United Nations family. PIMUN has in the past also simulated intergovernmental organizations and other regional bodies, such as the African Union, the Organisation internationale de la Francophonie, and the Organization of American States. In these bodies, participants represent the diplomats of a member state.

PIMUN currently uses the Interconnectivity system for some of its committees. Interconnectivity enables committees and delegates to interact with each other during the simulation, thus creating a more dynamic environment than standard committees, which generally operate autonomously and independently from each other. While participants to interconnectivity committees still simulate being diplomats, others may also embody journalists.

The conference also features crisis committees, which are a more dynamic part of model United Nations. Instead of embodying diplomats and writing resolutions like in classic MUN committees, crisis delegates embody fictional or nonfictional characters and enjoy special portfolio powers, which they can use as they wish throughout the evolving crisis. The conference has featured joint crisis committees, where several committees are in conflict with each other, since at least 2017.

The conference generally lasts three to four days, and has been held once a year since 2011.

== CINUP - PIMUN conferences ==
Session	Year	Dates	Location	Presidency CINUP		Secretary general PIMUN		
Session	Year	Dates	Location	Name	University	Name	University	Guest speakers
1	2008	February 27–29	Sciences Po			Tarik Peudon-Bellalou	Sciences Po	
2	2009	February 16–18	Sciences Po			Raphaël Chauvelot-Rattier	Sciences Po	
3	2010	April 27–30	Sciences Po			Simon Pallhuber	Sciences Po	Richard Descoings
4	2011	May 30 – June 1	Sciences Po				Sciences Po	
5	2012	May 18–20	Sciences Po (opening) UNESCO			Rémi Rivoal	Sciences Po	Gérard Araud
6	2013	May 31 – June 2	Sciences Po UNESCO (closing)			Romane Viennet	Sciences Po	Bertrand Badie Rachad Ahmed Saleh Farah
7	2014	May 22–25	University of Paris 1 Pantheon-Sorbonne UNESCO (closing)			Gaële Bacqué	Sciences Po	Jean-Marc Bonnisseau Bernard Miyet Philippe Cantraine
8	2015	May 28–31	University of Paris 1 Pantheon-Sorbonne UNESCO (closing)			Hana Hudak	University of Paris III: Sorbonne Nouvelle	
9	2016	May 24–28	OECD (opening) University of Paris 1 Pantheon-Sorbonne			William Thay	University of Paris 1 Pantheon-Sorbonne	Gabriela Ramos Gilles Boeuf Denis Mercier
10	2017	May 31 - June 5	Sciences Po Palais des Congrès (closing)			Farshid Farouk	Sciences Po	Miguel Ángel Moratinos
11	2018	May 24–27	Sciences Po Institut Catholique de Paris American Graduate School in Paris	Justine JADOT	Université Paris Nanterre	Marguerite Lassalle	Institut Catholique de Paris	Bernard Miyet
12	2019	May 30 - June 2	Paris Dauphine University (opening) University of Paris 1 Pantheon-Sorbonne	Florian DARRAS	Science Po	Victor Gaonach	IRIS Sup'	Jean-Marc de La Sablière
13	2021	June 1 – 4	Paris Dauphine University	Éric Guiochon	Institut libre des relations internationales et des sciences politiques	Georgina Lukovic	Institut Catholique de Paris	
14	2023	May 31 – June 3	Sorbonne Nouvelle University Paris 3	Éric Guiochon	Institut libre des relations internationales et des sciences politiques	Hugo Berny	Sorbonne Nouvelle University Paris 3	Anne-Claire Legendre
15	2024	May 31 – June 4	Paris-Panthéon-Assas University Cité internationale universitaire de Paris	Charles Jeanne	Institut national des langues et civilisations orientales (Inalco)	Vincent Rastetter	University of Paris 1 Pantheon-Sorbonne	Jean-Maurice Ripert
16	2025	June 2 – June 5	Paris-Panthéon-Assas University	Vincent Rastetter	University of Paris 1 Pantheon- Sorbonne	Pablo Bertoletti	Paris-Panthéon-Assas University	Xing Qu
17	2026	May 27 – May 30	Institut Catholique de Paris	Éric Arnaud	Université Paris Nanterre	Morgane Wakim	Paris 1 Panthéon-Sorbonne University	Éléonore Caroit Michèle Ramis Alexandre S. Navarro
18	2027	May 26 – May 29		Jad Habib	Paris-Panthéon-Assas University	Servan Gil	Paris 1 Panthéon-Sorbonne University	

== See also ==
- List of model United Nations conferences
- Model United Nations
