= Collegium International =

French think tank

International Ethical, Scientific and Political Collegium, also called Collegium International, is a high-level group created in 2002.

== Origin ==
The International Ethical, Political and Scientific Collegium is committed, according to its founders, "to respond intelligently and forcefully to the decisive challenges facing humankind". An appeal calling for the Collegium's establishment was made public in February 2002 in New York and its membership was officially presented on April 2, 2003, in Brussels before the European Parliament.

Collegium members and associate members, signatories of the Appeal, are scientists, philosophers and present and former Heads of State and Government.

== Composition ==
Co-created by Michel Rocard, a former Prime Minister of France, Milan Kučan, who at the time of the Collegium's founding served as President of the Republic of Slovenia, and Stéphane Hessel, French diplomat, the group's members include:

- philosopher Edgar Morin, Honorary Président
- French "Défenseur des Droits", Jacques Toubon, Président
- Director-General of the World Trade Organization (WTO), Pascal Lamy, Vice-Président
- former President Fernando Henrique Cardoso of Brazil
- former President Alpha Oumar Konaré of Mali
- Ruth Dreifuss, former Federal Counsellor of Switzerland
- philosopher Peter Sloterdijk
- philosopher Jürgen Habermas
- philosopher Jean-Pierre Dupuy
- international-law professor Mireille Delmas-Marty
- international relations professor Michael W. Doyle
- Mary Robinson, former President of Ireland and UN High Commissioner for Human Rights
- Nobel Prize winner Joseph Stiglitz
- Nobel Prize winner Amartya Sen
- ambassador of France, Bernard Miyet
- former ambassador of the USA William vanden Heuvel

The film-producer Sacha Goldman serves as the Collegium's Secretary General.

== Open letters, public meetings, conferences, etc. ==
- September 2004: Open letter to the candidates of the 2004 United States presidential election, George W. Bush and John Kerry, published in The Nation, US-based weekly magazine
- March 2007: Roundtable in Geneva on the realisation of economic, social and cultural rights
- September 2007: Roundtable in Paris about Science and Politics
- 2014: "Global Solidarity, Global Responsibility: An Appeal for World Governance"
