= Sophie Wahnich =

French historian

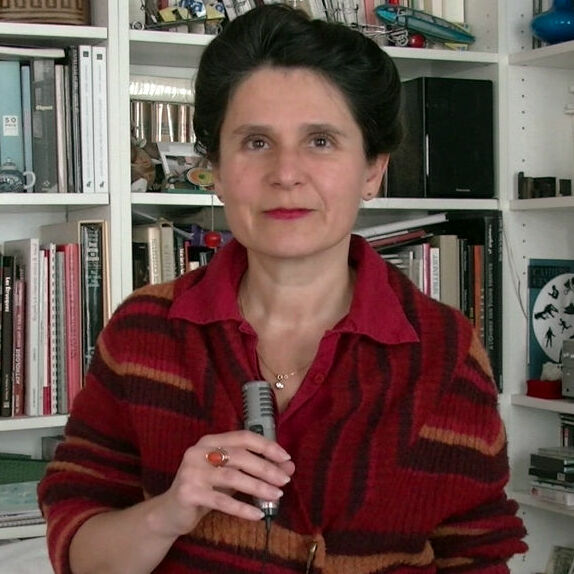

Academic background
- Doctoral advisor: Michel Vovelle

Academic work
- Discipline: Historian
- Sub-discipline: French Revolution
- Institutions: French National Centre for Scientific Research

Sophie Wahnich is a French historian. She is director of research at the French National Centre for Scientific Research (CNRS) and a specialist in the French Revolution.

== Biography ==
Sophie Wahnich holds an agrégation (1988) and a doctorate in history (1994), and is qualified to direct research (2007).

Wahnich is director of research at the CNRS and director of the Institut Interdisciplinaire d'Anthropologie du Contemporain (IIAC). Her work focuses on the relationship between the French Revolution and the present time. Her thesis was on the notion of the foreigner in the discourse of the French Revolution, and her Habilitation was entitled Histoire des émotions et présents de l'histoire, une approche politique et anthropologique du sensible en politique.

She is involved in various collectives. For example, she was a member of the board of the Comité de vigilance face aux usages publics de l'histoire (CVUH), and in 2015, she participated in the creation of the Conseils d'urgence citoyenne.

She also denounces a "privatization of knowledge ", which led her to be the candidate of the Pirate Party in the 12th district of the Hauts-de-Seine during the 2012 legislative elections.

She co-signed tribunes in various media, including one published in 2017 in Mediapart entitled "Faire gagner la gauche passe par le vote Mélenchon" (Making the left win goes through the Mélenchon vote).

In 2019, Wahnich participated in the summer university of Révolution permanente (revolutionary communist current of the New Anticapitalist Party) where she gave a conference presentation entitled 1789 : Révolution bourgeoise ou révolution populaire? (1789: Bourgeois revolution or popular revolution?).

== Selected works ==
- L’Impossible Citoyen, l'étranger dans le discours de la Révolution française, Éditions Albin Michel (1997).Reissued in 2010 in the collection Bibliothèque de l'Évolution de l'Humanité, with an afterword by the author.
- Lyon en Révolution, des objets qui racontent l’histoire, Lyon, EMCC, June 2003.
- La Liberté ou la mort — Essai sur la Terreur et le terrorisme, Éditions La Fabrique (2003). Reprinted in English, In Defence of the Terror, Liberty or Death in the French Révolution, London, New York, Verso, 2012. ISBN 9781844678624
- La Longue Patience du peuple, 1792, naissance de la République, Paris, Payot, 2008.
- Les Émotions, la Révolution française et le présent : Exercices pratiques de conscience historique, Paris, CNRS Éditions, 2009.
- La Révolution française, un événement de la raison sensible, Paris, Hachette, 2012.
- L’intelligence politique de la Révolution française, Paris, Textuel, 2013.
- La Révolution française n'est pas un mythe, Paris, Klincksieck, collection "Critique de la politique", 2017.
- Le Radeau démocratique. Chroniques des temps incertains, Paris, Éditions Lignes, 2017.
- Le Ruban tricolore. Un lien politique, Paris, Groupe Bayard, 2022.
