= IIAC =

IIAC may refer to:

== Sports ==
- Interstate Intercollegiate Athletic Conference, a now-defunct college athletics conference, formerly Illinois Intercollegiate Athletic Conference
- Iowa Intercollegiate Athletic Conference, the former name of a college athletics conference now known as the American Rivers Conference

== Other uses ==
- Incheon International Airport Corporation, a corporation which operates Incheon International Airport (Airport of Republic of Korea)
- Institut Interdisciplinaire d'Anthropologie du Contemporain, a French research institute, which became the laboratoire d'anthropologie politique (LAP) in 2022.
