= Georges Friedmann =

French sociologist and philosopher

- Born: Georges Philippe Friedmann; 13 May 1902; Paris, France
- Died: 15 November 1977 (aged 75); Paris, France
- Education: École Normale Supérieure; University of Paris
- Known for: Labor sociology, technical civilization
- Scientific career
- Fields: Sociology

Georges Philippe Friedmann (French: [fʁidman]; 13 May 1902 – 15 November 1977) was a French sociologist and philosopher, known for his influential work on the effects of industrial labor on individuals and his criticisms of the uncontrolled embrace of technological change in twentieth-century Europe and the United States.

He was the third president of the International Sociological Association (1956–1959).

== Biography ==
Friedmann was the last child of Adolphe Friedmann (1857–1922), a German-Jewish merchant from Berlin, and Elizabeth Nathan (1871–1940). He was born in Paris, where his parents moved after their marriage in Berlin in 1892. They acquired French nationality in 1906.

After a brief period studying industrial chemistry, Friedmann prepared for the philosophy agrégation at the prestigious Lycée Henri IV in Paris. He studied philosophy at the École Normale Supérieure from 1923 to 1926. He served as an assistant to the sociologist Célestin Bouglé at the Centre de documentation sociale, a social science research center at the ENS funded by the banker Albert Kahn and, later, the Rockefeller Foundation.

Upon the death of his father in 1922, Friedmann inherited a fortune of 2.6 million francs, which enabled him to finance several of his young classmates' intellectual journals. Friedmann eventually donated a large part of the fortune to the Fondation Curie for cancer research. After his death, Degas paintings Friedmann had inherited from his father's collection were donated to the Louvre.

Friedmann married his first wife, Hania Olszweska, a Polish Catholic, in 1937. The couple had one daughter, Liliane, born in 1941 in Toulouse. After Hania's death in 1957, Friedmann married Marcelle Rémond in 1960.

After taking his family to Toulouse, Friedmann joined the French Resistance during World War II, when he was hunted by the Nazi Gestapo due to his Communist activities. He later wrote that he escaped the Gestapo in 1943, and was hidden in a school in Dordogne by a pair of young schoolteachers.^{[2]} Friedmann's journals from the war, published posthumously in 1987, recounted his experiences as a member of the resistance.

Friedmann identified as a secular Jew his entire life, but anti-Semitism, the horrors of the Holocaust, and later his engagement with the young state of Israel led him to become more sympathetic to and more engaged with the Jewish people, though usually from a distance as an observer and not as a whole-hearted member of any particular religious community.

He received his Doctorat d'état in 1946, with his major thesis on mechanization in industrial production and minor thesis on Leibniz and Baruch Spinoza, both published as monographs.

== Scholarly work ==
At the ENS, Friedmann was close to the philosophy group that opposed the influence of Henri Bergson and was influential in bringing Marx's earlier philosophical texts to France, and included Georges Politzer, Norbert Gutermann, Paul Nizan, and Henri Lefebvre. The group's initial journal, Esprit, and its successor, Philosophies, were funded by Friedmann's personal wealth.

During the 1930s, Friedmann made several trips to the Soviet Union, where observed the Soviet industry and technology. His 1938 book, De la Sainte Russie à l'U.R.S.S. established him as an authority on Soviet society in France. But even his moderate criticisms of the U.S.S.R. and Stalin caused bitter conflict with members of the French Communist Party and began Friedmann's move away from political activism.

Friedmann's doctoral thesis, published after the end of the war in 1946, examined the "human problems" of automation and mechanization European industrial production. A critical, historical overview of paradigms of industrial management, particularly scientific management, industrial psychology, and human relations, Problèmes humains du machinisme industriel examined social scientists’ efforts to "humanize" industrial labor that had been fragmented and de-skilled by industrialization and Taylorism. Friedmann argued that while these efforts were an improvement on the "technicist ideology" of management engineering, social science would not lead to significant changes in labor practices without class conflict and the transformation of the capitalist economic system.

Friedmann's book is considered a founding text of French sociologie du travail, and he was influential in the refounding of French sociology after World War II, playing a major role in the foundations of the Centre d'études sociologues and the Institute des Sciences Sociales du Travail (ISST). His influential students included Alain Touraine, Michel Crozier, Jean-Daniel Reynaud, and Jean-René Tréanton, who conducted some of the first empirical work in industrial sociology in France.

Friedmann later founded the Centre d'études de communications de masse (CECMAS) at the École pratiques des hautes études, whose early participants included Edgar Morin and Roland Barthes. This was later renamed first Centre d'Études Transdisciplinaires, Sociologie, Anthropologie, Histoire (CETSAH), and then the Edgar Morin Centre.

Friedmann continued to travel extensively around the world, observing and publishing on labor practices and industrial models in the United States, Israel, and South America. His analysis of the nature of the Jewish people and Israeli society in The End of the Jewish People?, one of his few works to be translated into English, attracted media attention in the United States.

Friedmann gradually shifted from emphasis on labor to a broader concern with "technical civilization." His final book, La Puissance et la Sagesse, a mixture of autobiography and reflection on contemporary society, modified his earlier Marxism and emphasized the importance of interiority and morality on humanizing postwar consumer society.

== Bibliography ==
- A history of the French people. With Guy de La Batut (1923)
- 'Frédéric Winslow Taylor: l'optimisme d'un ingénieur'. Annales d'histoire économique et sociale, Nov. 30, 1935,
- La Crise du progrès: esquisse d'histoire des idées, 1895-1935 (Paris: Gallimard, 1936)
- De la Sainte Russie à l'U.R.S.S. (Paris: Gallimard, 1938)
- Problèmes humains du machinisme industriel (Paris: Gallimard, 1946)
  - Industrial Society: The Emergence of Human Problems of Automation (Glencoe, Ill.: Free Press, 1955)
- Où va le travail humain? (Paris: Gallimard, 1950)
- Le travail en miettes (Paris: Gallimard, 1956)
  - The Anatomy of Work: Labor, Leisure, and the Implications of Automation, trans. Wyatt Watson (Glencoe, Ill: Free Press, 1961)
- Problèmes d'Amérique latine (Paris: Gallimard, 1959)
- Signal d'une troisième voie? (Paris: Gallimard, 1961)
- Fin du peuple juif? (Paris: Gallimard, 1965)
  - The End of the Jewish People? (New York: Doubleday, 1967)
- Sept études sur l'homme et la technique: Le pourquoi et le pour quoi de notre civilisation technicienne (Paris: Gonthier, 1966)
- La Puissance et la Sagesse (Paris: Gallimard, 1970)
- Journal de Guerre (1939-1940) (Paris: Gallimard, 1987)
- Ces merveilleux instruments: Essais sur la communication de masse (Paris: Denoël-Gonthier, 1988)
