= United Nations Department of Peace Operations =

Department of the United Nations

- Abbreviation: DPO
- Formation: March 1992
- Headquarters: United Nations Headquarters
- Head: Under-Secretary-General for Peace Operations; Jean-Pierre Lacroix
- Parent organization: United Nations Secretariat
- Subsidiaries: Office of Operations, Office of Rule of Law and Security Institutions, Office of Military Affairs, Policy, Evaluation and Training Division
- Website: peacekeeping.un.org/en/department-of-peace-operations

The Department of Peace Operations (DPO) (French: Département des opérations de maintien de la paix) is a department of the United Nations (UN) charged with the planning, preparation, management, and direction of UN peacekeeping operations. Previously known as the Department of Peacekeeping Operations (DPKO), it was created in 1992 as part of a restructuring of the UN's peace and security apparatus. The DPO retains the core functions and responsibilities of its predecessor, with a greater emphasis on cohesion, integrating different resources and knowledge, and promoting human rights.

With an annual budget of roughly $5.7 billion as of 2026, the DPO is the largest UN agency by expenditure, exceeding the UN's own regular budget. As of 31 May 2026, it oversaw 51,108 personnel serving in 11 peacekeeping missions.

== History ==
The DPO traces its roots to 1948 with the creation of the United Nations Military Observer Group for India and Pakistan (UNMOGIP) and the United Nations Truce Supervision Organization (UNTSO). Up to the late 1980s, peacekeeping missions were operated by six officials in the United Nations Office of Special Political Affairs, which was headed first by Under-Secretary-General Ralph Bunche, and subsequently Brian Urquhart and Marrack Goulding. From the beginning, peacekeeping operations operated with a clear doctrine that applied to its traditional or classical peacekeeping operations for inter-state ceasefires: peacekeepers did not take sides or discharge firearms, save in self-defense, or meddle in politics.

The Department of Peacekeeping Operations was created in March 1992 when Boutros Boutros-Ghali took office as Secretary-General of the United Nations; its creation was one of his first decisions. In organisational terms, it upgraded and expanded upon the work of the previous Field Administration and Logistics Division (FALD) (which remained active as a subordinate department). Goulding became under-secretary-general (or USG) for peacekeeping with Kofi Annan appointed as his deputy. The role of the DPKO, however, wasn't clarified until June 1992, when Boutrous-Ghali issued An Agenda for Peace, a plan to strengthen the UN's capacity for preventive diplomacy and peacekeeping.

French nationals have served as Under-Secretaries-General for Peacekeeping Operations since 1997.

At an October 2006 press conference, then USG Jean-Marie Guéhenno announced that peacekeeping operations had reached an all-time high, and would continue to expand as UNIFIL and UNMIT reached full strength, and if a UN mission were to enter Darfur.

As of 2010, DPO led 16 different missions in Africa, the Caribbean, the Middle East, Americas, Europe, and Asia. Serving in these missions were over 100,000 uniformed and civilian personnel. Total approved annual expenses were over US$5 billion for the period July 2006 to June 2007.

== Organizational structure ==
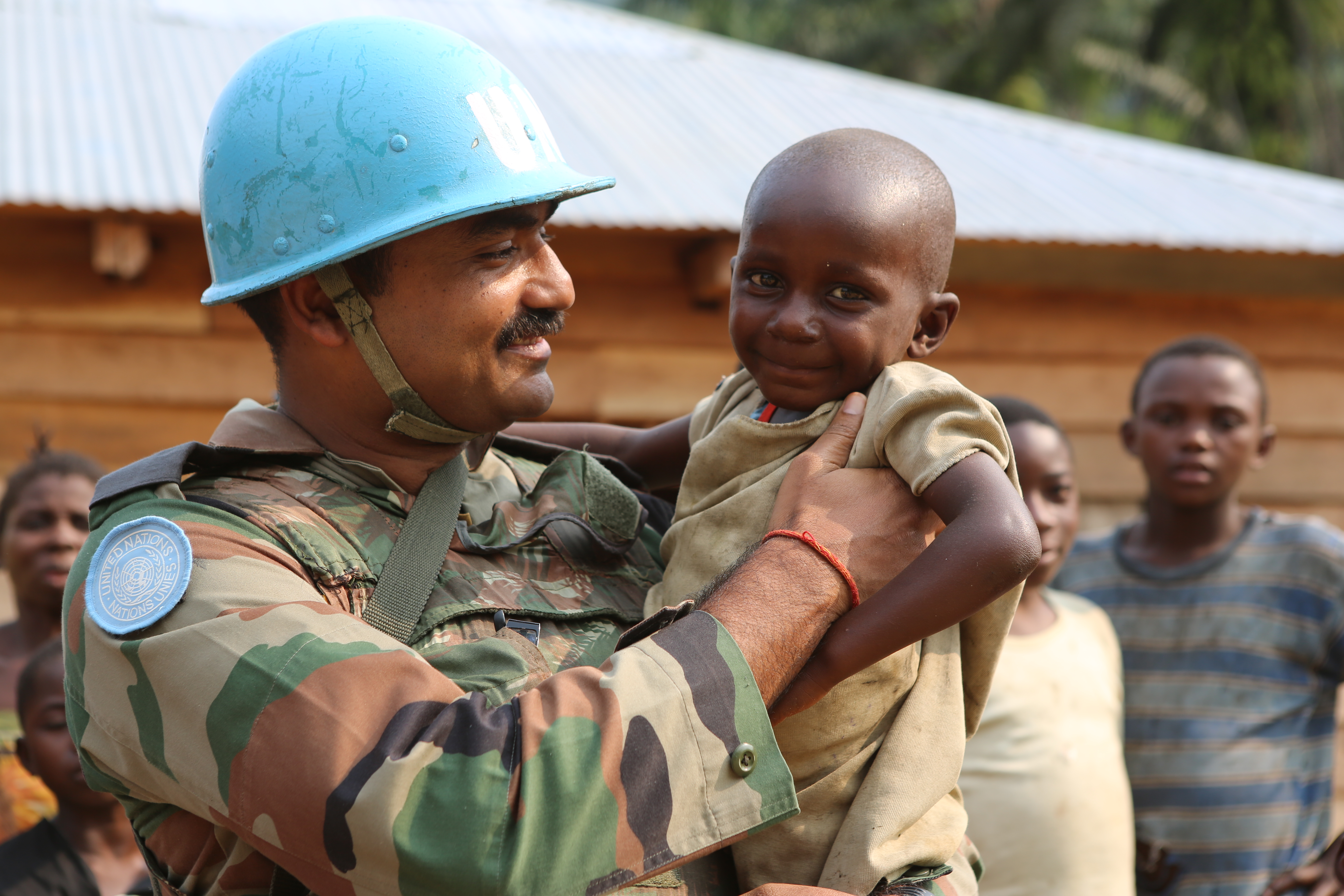
Indian Peacekeeper with a child in Congo (for MONUSCO mission), 2000

DPO is split into two main offices: the Office of Operations and the Office of Mission Support (OMS).

Included within the Office of Mission Support are the logistics and administrative divisions, which provide logistics, personnel, and financial support services to DPO missions. OMS is responsible for determining financial reimbursement to UN member states for their contribution of Contingent owned equipment, troops, and services to peacekeeping missions. Letters of Assist are an important part of this. Also part of DPO are Mine Action, Training, Best Practices, and Military and Police Divisions.

A March 2007 United Nations General Assembly Resolution titled "Strengthening the capacity of the Organization in Peacekeeping Operations" called for the re-structuring of the department and the establishment of a separate Department of Field Support. Whereas the new entity serves as an enabler by coordinating the administration and logistics in UN peacekeeping operations, DPO concentrates on policy planning and providing strategic directions.

This re-organisation was paralleled by a DPO reform effort launched in 2005 entitled 'Peace Operations 2010', which further pursues reforms initiated by the 'Brahimi Report' Report of the Panel on United Nations Peacekeeping Operations. This included an increase in personnel, the harmonization of the conditions of service of field and headquarters staff, the development of guidelines and standard operating procedures, and improving the partnership arrangement between the Department of Peace Operations (DPO) and the United Nations Development Programme (UNDP), African Union and European Union. One area of this reform effort has been the development of clearer internal doctrine or guidance for UN peacekeeping. The highest level DPO doctrine document was issued in 2008, known as the 'capstone' doctrine.

Secretary-General Guterres has made efforts to streamline peacekeeping efforts to conserve finances, and eliminate excess and unnecessary roles. Shared regional divisions of the DPA and DPO will restructure and remove duplication of tasks, allowing for more manpower to be available for new initiates and existing operations. This gives the department more resources and responsibilities for broader peace-building efforts, which are of course by their nature linked to political analysis and strategy (Cliffe, 2018).

== List of heads ==
The following is a chronological list of those who have held the position of Under-Secretary-General for Peacekeeping Operations:

No.	Portrait	Name (Birth–Death)	Term of office			Country	Secretary-General	Ref.
No.	Portrait	Name (Birth–Death)	Took office	Left office	Time in office	Country	Secretary-General	Ref.
1		Marrack Goulding (1936–2010)	March 1992	28 February 1993	11 months	United Kingdom	Boutros Boutros-Ghali	
2		Kofi Annan (1938–2018)	1 March 1993	31 December 1996	3 years, 9 months	Ghana	Boutros Boutros-Ghali	
3		Bernard Miyet (born 1946)	28 January 1997	30 September 2000	3 years, 8 months	France	Kofi Annan	
4		Jean-Marie Guéhenno (born 1949)	1 October 2000	30 June 2008	7 years, 8 months	France	Kofi Annan	
5		Alain Le Roy (born 1953)	30 June 2008	25 August 2011	3 years, 1 month	France	Ban Ki-moon	
6		Hervé Ladsous (born 1950)	2 September 2011	31 March 2017	5 years, 6 months	France	Ban Ki-moon	
7		Jean-Pierre Lacroix (born 1960)	1 April 2017	Incumbent	9 years, 4 months	France	António Guterres	

== Notable personnel ==
- Hédi Annabi (1943–2010), Tunisian diplomat and Special Representative of the UN Secretary-General, Head of the UN Stabilization Mission in Haiti, Assistant-Secretary-General at the DPO.
- Maurice Baril (born 1943), General in the Canadian Forces, Military Advisor to the UN Secretary-General, head of the Military Division of the DPO.
- Kiran Bedi (born 1949), Indian tennis player, first woman officer of the Indian Police Service, Lieutenant Governor of Puducherry, first woman to be appointed the DPO civilian police adviser.
- Patrick Cammaert (born 1950), Dutch general, UN Force Commander for the Eastern Democratic Republic of the Congo, Military Advisor to the UN Secretary-General, and Force Commander of the United Nations Mission in Ethiopia and Eritrea, as the Military Adviser in the DPO.
- Jonathan Conricus (born 1979), Swedish-Israeli IDF Lieutenant-Colonel, 24-year IDF veteran combat commander, IDF International Spokesperson, Assessment Officer in the Office of Military Affairs of the DPO, the first Israeli officer to hold any position at the UN.
- Edmond Mulet (born 1951), Guatemalan diplomat, lawyer, and notary public, Chief of Staff to UN Secretary-General, Assistant Secretary-General for DPO.
- Sir Brian Urquhart (1919–2021), British international civil servant and World War II Major and author, took the lead in organising the first U.N. peacekeeping force, served as the DPO Under-Secretary-General.

== Financing ==
The bulk of peacekeeping operations funding is appropriated much like the general budget, but permanent members of the Security Council are required to pay a larger share, and all states are free to contribute additional funding, equipment, or other services to missions of their respective choices.

UN Peacekeeping Operations budget for the fiscal year 1 July 2021 - 30 June 2022 amounted for $6.38 billion. This amount financed 10 of the 12 ongoing UN peacekeeping missions, along the liquidation of the UN African Union Hybrid Operation in Darfur (UNAMID) and logistics support for the African Union Mission in Somalia (AMISOM), providing the technology, logistics and general support to all peace operations through global service centres in Brindisi (Italy) and a regional service centre in Entebbe (Uganda).

The UN Truce Supervision Organisation (UNTSO) and the UN Military Observer Group in India and Pakistan (UNMOGIP) are excluded from the Peacekeeping Operations budget and are financed through the regular UN budget.

The top 5 providers of assessed contributions to the UN Peacekeeping Operations budget for 2020-2021 were: United States (27.89%), China (15.21%), Japan (8.56%), Germany (6.09%), and France (5.79%).

== See also ==
- List of United Nations peacekeeping missions
