= Letters of assist =

Letters of assist refers to a contractual document issued by the United Nations (UN) to a government authorizing it to provide goods or services to a peacekeeping or other UN operation.

== Formal definition and usage ==
A contractual document issued by the United Nations (UN) to a government authorizing it to provide goods or services to a peacekeeping operation; the UN agrees either to purchase the goods or services or authorizes the government to supply them subject to reimbursement by the UN. A letter of assist typically details specifically what is to be provided by the contributing government and establishes a funding limit that cannot be exceeded. Also called LOA. See also peacekeeping.

=== Contingent Owned Equipment ===
LOAs are often used in conjunction with Contingent Owned Equipment, an important aspect of many UN operations, peacekeeping or police. As the official UN website puts it:

The United Nations is financially responsible for the costs of contingent deployment to the mission and arranges a commercial contract or Letter of Assist (LOA) with the contributing country to transport the equipment, either by Sea, Rail, Road, or in special circumstances by Air. LOA are like commercial contracts but are only arranged between the UN and contributing countries Governments. Troops are normally transported by air to the peacekeeping mission area, with a cargo limit of 45kg per person. Equipment is deployed for the duration of the service in the mission area by the contingent. Personnel rotations, whereby contingent members are replaced with new personnel occur on a periodic basis, usually every 6/12 months.

=== Cost of LOAs to the UN Budget ===
As of 30 April 2013, the UN was liable for $64 million in relation to Letters of Assist, out of a total of $810 million then owed to Member States with regards as to outstanding payments for Peacekeeping and/or Policing operations.

== See also ==
- Department of Peacekeeping Operations
- Fixed price
- Offer and acceptance
- Task Force Scorpio
- United Nations Humanitarian Response Depot
