= Edgar Morin =

French philosopher and sociologist (1921–2026)

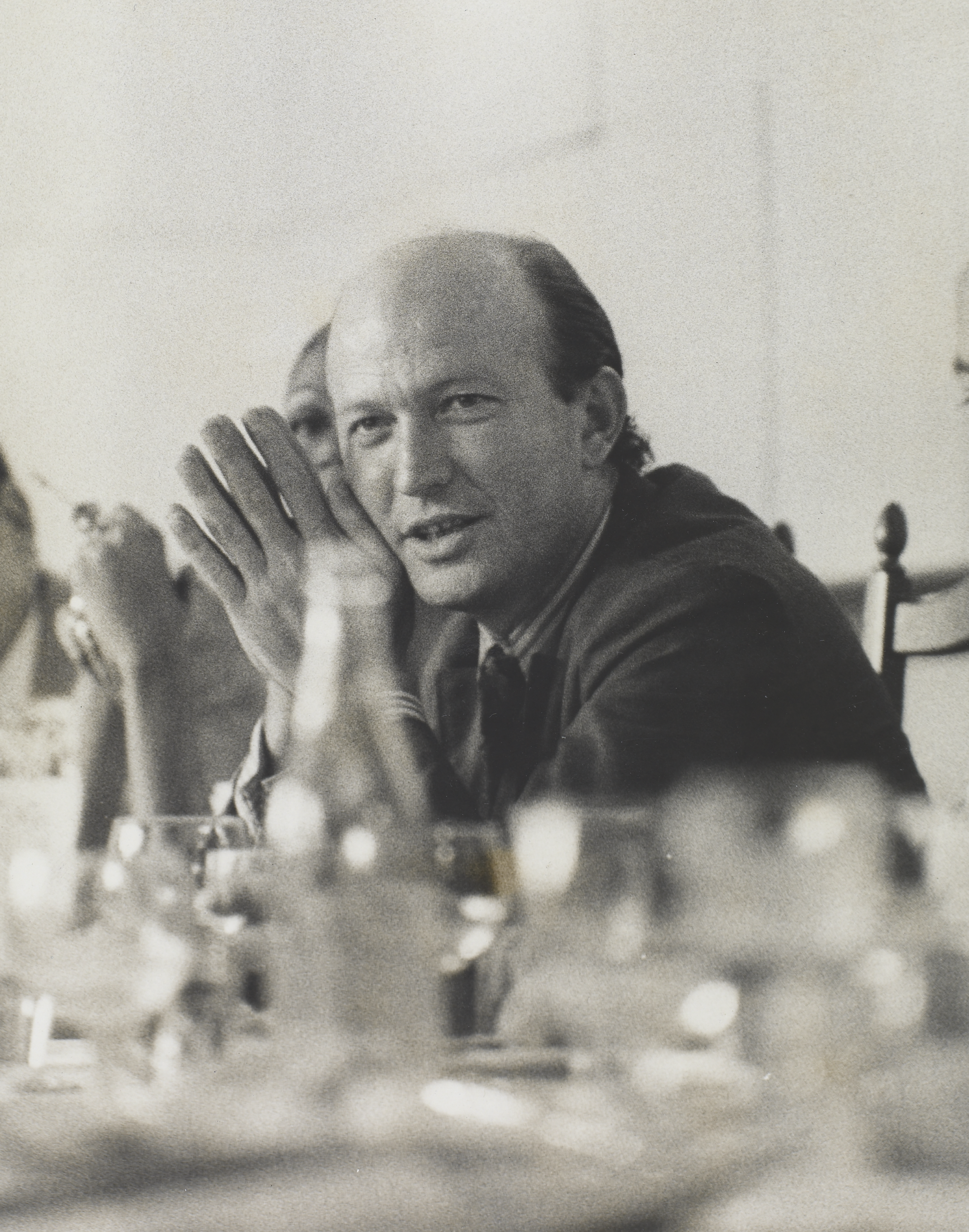
- Morin at a colloquium in Rio de Janeiro, 1972
- Born: Edgar Nahoum; 8 July 1921; Paris, France
- Died: 29 May 2026 (aged 104); Paris, France
- Political party: See list: SIA; PF; PCF (1941–1951)
- Spouses: Violette Chapellaubeau (m. 1945; div. 1970) Johanne Harrelle (m. 1972; div. 1981) Edwige Lannegrace (m. 1982; died 2008) Sabah Abouessalam (m. 2012)
- Children: 2

Education
- Education: University of Paris (attended); University of Toulouse (B.A./LL.B., 1942)
- Academic advisor: Georges Lefebvre

Philosophical work
- School: Continental philosophy Antireductionism; Constructivist epistemology Anti-foundationalism
- Institutions: CNRS; EHESS
- Main interests: Epistemology; Complexity theory Sociology
- Notable works: La méthode (1977–2004, 6 vols.)
- Notable ideas: See list: Chaosmos; Complex thought; Criticism of Ludwig von Bertalanffy's systems theory; Criticism of structuralism; Paradigm of complexity; Polycrisis

Edgar Morin (/mɔːˈræn/; French: [ɛdɡaʁ mɔʁɛ̃]; né Nahoum; 8 July 1921 – 29 May 2026) was a French philosopher and sociologist of the theory of information who has been recognised for his work on complexity and complex thought, and for his scholarly contributions to such diverse fields as media studies, politics, sociology, visual anthropology, ecology, education, and systems biology. He held two bachelors degrees, one in history and geography and one in law, and never did a Ph.D.

During his academic career, Morin was primarily associated with the École des hautes études en sciences sociales (EHESS) in Paris. Although less well known in the Anglophone world due to the limited availability of English translations of his over 60 books, Morin is renowned in the French-speaking world, Europe, and Latin America.

== Life and career ==
Edgar was born in Paris on 8 July 1921, to Vidal Nahoum and Luna Beressi, Sephardic Jews from Thessaloniki of distant Italian ancestry. He was registered as David-Salomon Nahoum, a name he was never known by; his parents settled on Edgar, which he later made official through an acte de notoriété. They moved to Marseille, and later to Paris. His family was secular and had not practiced Judaism for three generations. His mother died when he was ten years old.

In 1936, during the Spanish Civil War, Morin joined the libertarian socialist organization Solidaridad Internacional Antifascista (SIA). Two years later, he joined the pacifist, anti-fascist, and left-wing Frontist Party (PF). When the Nazis invaded France in 1940, Morin assisted refugees and joined the French Resistance. He left Paris to the "free zone" Toulouse, where he continued to study law at the University of Toulouse. He joined the French Communist Party in 1941. He then joined Michel Cailliau's MRPGD (Mouvement de Résistance des Prisonniers de Guerre et Déportés), a resistance movement against the German occupation of France. As a member of the French Resistance, he adopted the pseudonym Morin after a miscommunication during a meeting of resistance fighters in Toulouse, when he introduced himself as "Edgar Manin", in reference to André Malraux's character in La Condition humaine. They misheard him as "Morin" and the name stuck.

The MRPGD later merged into François Mitterrand's MNPGD (Mouvement national des prisonniers de guerre et déportés). Morin later became attaché to the staff of the 1st French Army in Germany (1945), then head of the "Propaganda" office in the French Military Government (1946). At the Liberation, he wrote L'An zéro de l'Allemagne (Germany's Year Zero), in which he described the mental state of the defeated people of Germany as being in a state of "somnambulism", in the grip of a "state of depression", hunger, and rumors. In 1945, Morin married Irène "Violette" Chapellaubeau (the couple had two children: sociologist Irène Nahoum-Léothaud and anthropologist Véronique Nahoum-Grappe) and they lived in Landau, where he served as a lieutenant in the French Occupation army in Germany.

In 1946, Morin returned to Paris and gave up his military career to pursue his activities with the Communist Party. In 1948 and 1949, he wrote for the arts and entertainment section of the Patriote Résistant. Other literary contributions in this year include the Communist Party leader Maurice Thorez inviting him to write for the weekly Les Lettres Françaises, and Morin connecting the philosopher Martin Heidegger with the journal Fontaine to write a review. Due to his critical posture, his relationship with the party gradually deteriorated and he failed to renew his membership in 1950. He was formally expelled in 1951 after he published an article in L'Observateur politique, économique et littéraire. In the same year, he was admitted to the National Center of Scientific Research (CNRS) with the support of Maurice Merleau-Ponty and Vladimir Jankélévitch.

In 1955, Morin was one of the four leaders of the Comité contre la guerre d'Algérie (Committee against the Algerian War) and he defended Algerian politician Messali Hadj. Unlike Jean-Paul Sartre, André Breton, Guy Debord and his friends Marguerite Duras and Dionys Mascolo, he did not sign the Declaration on the Right to Insubordination in the Algerian War, known as the "Manifesto of 121", published in September 1960 in the journal Vérité-Liberté. Believing that the urgent need was to avoid the installation of dictatorships in France and Algeria, he joined Claude Lefort, Maurice Merleau-Ponty and Roland Barthes in calling instead for urgent negotiations. In 1954, Morin co-founded and directed the magazine Arguments, which ran until 1962.

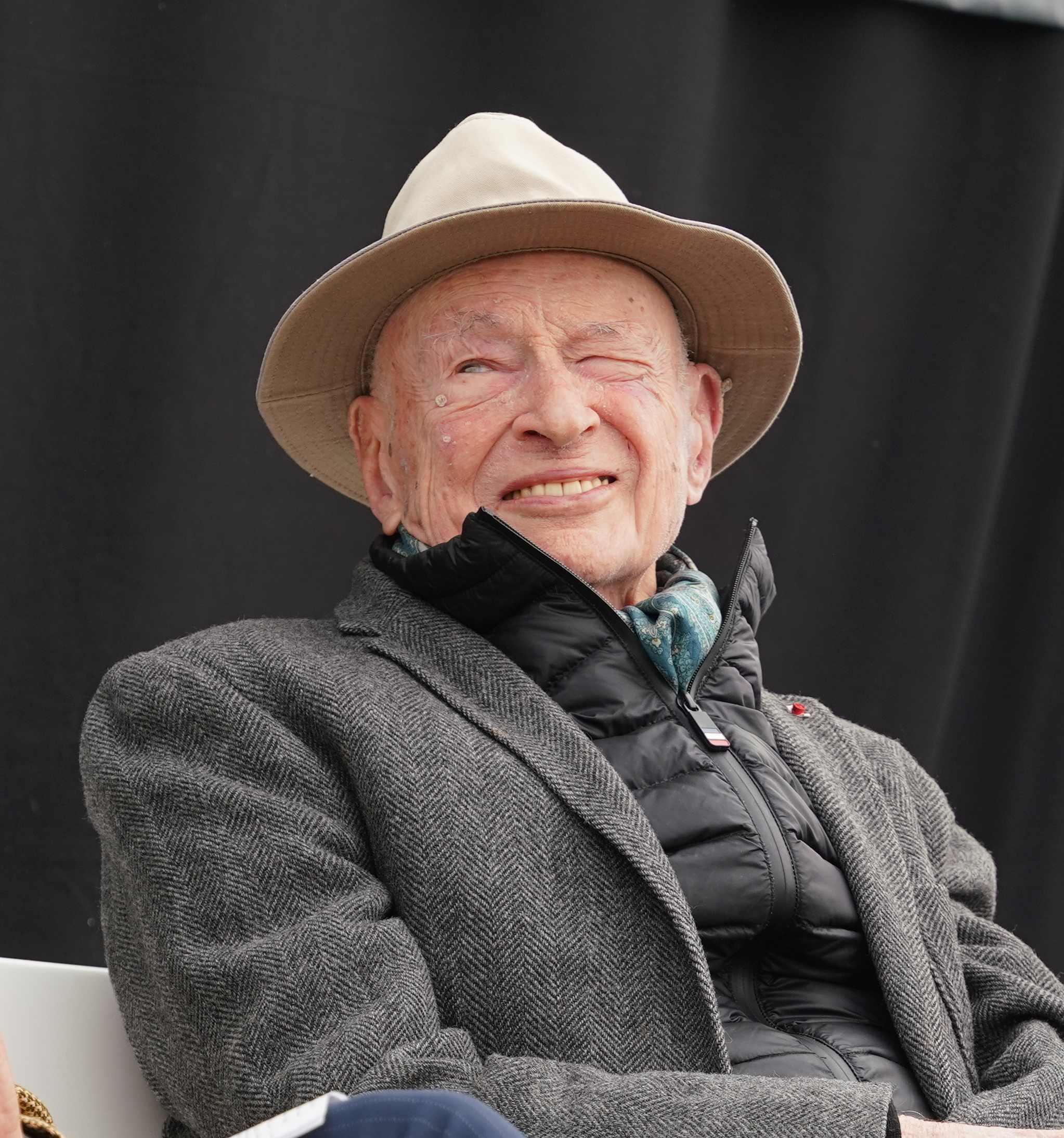
Morin in 2024

In 1959, Morin's book Autocritique was published. The book was a sustained reflection on his adherence to, and subsequent exit from, the Communist Party, focusing on the dangers of ideology and self-deception. In 1960, Morin travelled extensively in Latin America, visiting Brazil, Chile, Bolivia, Peru and Mexico. He returned to France, where he published L'Esprit du Temps, a work on popular culture. That same year, French sociologist Georges Friedmann brought him and Roland Barthes together to create a Centre for the Study of Mass Communication that, after several name changes, became the Edgar Morin Centre of the EHESS, Paris. Also in 1960, Morin and Jean Rouch coauthored the film Chronique d'un été, an early example of cinéma vérité and direct cinema.

Beginning in 1965, Morin became involved in a large multidisciplinary project, financed by the Délégation Générale à la Recherche Scientifique et Technologique in Plozévet. This project culminated in La Métamorphose de Plodémet (1967), which was an ethnology of contemporary French society about the commune of Plozévet (in Finistère), where he stayed for almost a year. In 1968, Morin became the center of a controversy after the publication of his study, as local inhabitants felt betrayed by his work and denounced inaccuracies that he published. Morin attempted to clarify his intentions and answered critics on the Canadian television show Le Sel de la semaine, and it was agreed that the inhabitants misinterpreted his sociological jargon, and he likewise misinterpreted their cultural references and jokes.

In 1968, Morin replaced the incumbent professor of philosophy, Henri Lefebvre, at the University of Nanterre. He became involved in the student revolts that began to emerge in France. In May 1968, he wrote a series of articles for Le Monde that tried to understand what he called "The Student Commune." He followed the student revolt closely and wrote a second series of articles in Le Monde called "The Revolution without a Face", as well as coauthoring Mai 68: La brèche with Cornelius Castoriadis and Claude Lefort.

In 1969, Morin researched the spread of an antisemitic libel that occurred in the town of Orléans. He published La Rumeur d'Orléans later that year. Morin argued that urbanization, consumer society, and sexual liberation had generated social disorientation that manifested itself in antisemitic fantasies. The study attracted considerable public attention.

In 1969-70, Morin spent a year at the Salk Institute for Biological Studies in La Jolla, California. Jonas Salk invited him under the recommendation of Jacques Monod and John Hunt, with the sole imposed condition of learning. It was there, in this "breeding ground for Nobel Prizes" that he familiarized himself with systems theory. He read Henri Laborit, James Watson, Stéphane Lupasco, Bronowski, and was introduced to the thought of Gregory Bateson and the "new problematic in ecology".

In 1970, Morin married Johanne Harrelle, but the marriage did not last; after their divorce in 1981, they remained friends until her death in 1994. In 1982, he married Edwige Lannegrace, who was his lifelong partner until her death in 2008. In the 1972 international colloquium L'Unité de l'Homme, which he co-organized with Jacques Monod and Massimo Piatelli-Palmarini, Morin aimed to bridge different disciplinary perspectives on human nature. His communication "Le Paradigme perdu: la nature humaine" became a book the following year. In 1983, he published De la nature de l’URSS, which deepened his analysis of Soviet communism and anticipated the perestroika of Mikhail Gorbachev.

In 2002, Morin participated in the creation of the International Ethical, Scientific and Political Collegium. Also that year, he made a trip to Iran with Dariush Shayegan. In June 2002, Morin published a widely discussed op-ed with Sami Naïr and Danièle Sallenave in Le Monde entitled "Israël-Palestine: le cancer", where they argued that the suffering of the Jewish people had allowed Israel to become an oppressor of the Palestinian people. The authors were sued for "racial defamation and apology for terrorist acts" by France-Israël et Avocats sans frontières, but were ultimately acquitted by the court of cassation, which recognized the article as falling under the freedom of expression.

Following a meeting at a music festival in Fez, Morocco, in 2009, Morin became close with sociology professor Sabah Abouessalam. The couple married in 2012. In 2013, the couple tried to rehabilitate an ecological farm in the Marrakech region owned by his family; they were inspired by the agro-ecology of Pierre Rabhi. They also collaborated on the text, La rencontre improbable et nécessaire (Presses de la Renaissance, 2013), and in 2020 on Changeons de voie - Les leçons du coronavirus (Denoël, 2020).

In 2013, Morin supported Chief Raoni in his fight against the Belo Monte dam in Brazil. Raoni, intellectuals, lawyers, and politicians launched a moral tribunal for crimes against nature and the future of humanity during the Rio+20 Conference. In the same year, Morin and twelve other intellectuals joined the platform published by the European citizens' initiative End Ecocide in Europe. In 2019, he declared in an article in Liberation.fr that money's power is at the origin of ecological degradation. At the age of 101, Morin worked on a translation of 32 of his essays alongside sociologist Amy Heath-Carpentier in the book The Challenge of Complexity: Essays by Edgar Morin, which included a few that were translated into English for the first time.

Morin died in Paris on 29 May 2026, at the age of 104. On 3 June, he was honored by a ceremony in the south courtyard of Les Invalides. At the ceremony, President Emmanuel Macron praised his "humanist" legacy.

Morin is buried in Montparnasse Cemetery.

== Recognition and legacy ==
Morin did not embrace the French postmodern or poststructuralist movements, instead pursuing his own research agenda. As a result, US academics did not transport his theories into disciplinary discourses in the same fashion as they did Michel Foucault's, Jacques Derrida's, and Béatrice Galinon-Mélénec's. However, Morin's work spans scholarly and popular literature, and he has appeared on the cover of multiple publications including Sciences Humaines, as well as a special issue of Le Monde.

In addition to being the UNESCO Chair of Complex Thought, Morin is known as a founder of transdisciplinarity. As of 2013 he held honorary doctorates in a variety of social science fields from 21 universities: Messina, Geneva, Milan, Bergamo, Thessaloniki, La Paz, Odense, Perugia, Cosenza, Palermo, Nuevo León, Université Laval in Québec, Brussels, Barcelona, Guadalajara, Valencia, Vera Cruz, Santiago, the Pontifical Catholic University of Rio Grande do Sul, the Universidade Federal do Rio Grande do Norte, and Candido Mendes University in Rio de Janeiro. Several academic institutions have been named in his honor, with research centers based on his transdisciplinary methods and philosophy.

- Edgar Morin Centre in Paris (formerly Centre d'Études Transdisciplinaires, Sociologie, Anthropologie, Histoire, or CETSAH), a graduate teaching and research unit of the École des Hautes Études en Sciences Sociales (EHESS) and of the French Centre National de la Recherche Scientifique (CNRS) in Paris.
- Centro Studi di Filosofia della Complessità Edgar Morin at the University of Messina, Messina, Sicily, Italy.
- Multiversidad Mundo Real Edgar Morin in Mexico, a university.
- Instituto Peruano del Pensamiento Complejo Edgar Morin at Ricardo Palma University in Lima, Peru.

Morin is the subject of several biographies as well as documentary films and TV shows, including the 2015 documentary Edgar Morin, chronique d'un regard, co-directed by Olivier Bohler and Céline Gailleurd. His 100th birthday in 2021 was celebrated in France, Italy, and Latin America, and several collections of essays were published in his honour. His work has been influential in southern Europe, Latin America, Francophone Africa, and into the 2020s in China and Japan. Morin's work has become increasingly accessible to the English-speaking world, notably with the 2022 publication of The Challenge of Complexity: Essays by Edgar Morin, which compiled 32 essays, including some that were translated into English for the first time. Morin worked on this collection with sociologist Amy Heath-Carpentier at the age of 101. Morin was elevated to the dignity of Knight Grand Cross of the Legion of Honour, in the Honours List of Bastille Day 2021 by French President Emmanuel Macron.

== Honours ==
Ribbon bar	Country	Honour
	France	Grand Cross of the National Order of the Legion of Honour
	France	Grand officer of the National Order of Merit
	France	Commander of the Ordre des Arts et des Lettres
PRT Order of Saint James of the Sword - Grand Cross BAR	Portugal	Grand Cross of the Military Order of Saint James of the Sword
	Portugal	Grand Cross of the Order of Prince Henry
Order of Lifesaving (Morocco)	Morocco	Commander of the Order of Intellectual Merit
	Spain	Officer of the Order of Civil Merit

== Books ==
- 1946: L'An zéro de l'Allemagne, Paris, Éditions de la Cité Universelle.
- 1947: Allemagne notre souci, Paris, Éditions Hier et Aujourd'hui.
- 1948: Une cornerie, Paris, Éditions Nagel.
- 1948: L'Homme et la Mort, Paris, Éditions Corrêa.
- 1956: Le Cinéma ou l'homme imaginaire, Paris, Éditions de Minuit.
- 1957: Les Stars, Paris, Le Seuil.
- 1959: Autocritique, Paris, Le Seuil.
- 1962: L'esprit du temps. Essai sur la culture de masse, Paris, Grasset-Fasquelle.
- 1967: Commune en France. La métamorphose de Plodémet, Paris, Fayard. Translated to English by A. M. Sheridan-Smith as The red and the white: report from a French village, New York : Pantheon Books, 1970.
- 1968: Mai 68, La Brèche, Paris, Fayard.
- 1969: La Rumeur d'Orléans, Paris, Le Seuil. Translated to English by Peter Green as Rumour in Orléans, New York : Pantheon Books, 1971.
- 1969: Introduction à une politique de l'homme, Paris, Le Seuil.
- 1969: Le vif du sujet, Paris, Le Seuil.
- 1970: Journal de Californie, Paris, Le Seuil.
- 1973: Le Paradigme perdu : la nature humaine, Paris, Le Seuil.
- 1975: La bureaucratie (collected work), Paris, Union générale d'éditions
- 1974: L'unité de l'homme, Paris, Le Seuil.
- 1977: La Méthode, Paris, Le Seuil.
- 1977: "The Noise and the Message". New York: Telos Press.
- 1981: Pour sortir du XXe siècle, Paris, Nathan.
- 1982: Science avec conscience, Paris, Fayard.
- 1983: De la nature de l’URSS, Paris, Fayard.
- 1984: Le Rose et le noir, Paris, Galilée.
- 1984: New York: la ville de villes, Paris, Galilée.
- 1984: Sociologie, Paris, Fayard.
- 1987: Penser l'Europe, Paris, Gallimard.
- 1988: Mais..., Paris, Édition Neo/Soco Invest.
- 1989: Vidal et les siens, Paris, Le Seuil.
- 1990: Introduction à la pensée complexe, Paris, ESF.
- 1991: Un nouveau commencement (with Bocchi Gianluca and Mauro Ceruti)
- 1993: Terre-Patrie, Paris, Le Seuil. (with Anne-Brigitte Kern)
- 1994: Mes démons, Paris, Stock.
- 1994: La complexité humaine (as editor)
- 1995: Les Fratricides : Yougoslavie-Bosnie (1991-1995), Paris, Édition Arléa.
- 1995: Une année sisyphe, Paris, Le Seuil.
- 1997: Comprendre la complexité dans les organisations de soins, Paris, ASPEPS.
- 1997: Une politique de civilisation, Paris, Arléa, Paris.
- 1997: Amour, Poésie, Sagesse, Paris, Le Seuil.
- 1999: L'Intelligence de la complexité, Paris, L'Harmattan.
- 1999: Relier les connaissances, Paris, Le Seuil.
- 1999: Une tête bien faite : Repenser la réforme, réformer la pensée, Paris, Le Seuil.
- 2000: Les Sept Savoirs nécessaires à l'éducation du futur, Paris, Le Seuil.
- 2000: Nul ne connaît le jour qui naîtra (interviews with Edmond Blattchen)
- 2000: Dialogue sur la nature humaine, Paris, L'Aube.
- 2001: Journal de Plozévet, Bretagne, 1965, Paris, L'Aube.
- 2002: Dialogue sur la connaissance. Entretiens avec des lycéens, Paris, La Tour d'Aigues.
- 2002: Pour une politique de civilisation, Paris, Arléa.
- 2003: La Violence du monde, Paris, Édition du Félin.
- 2003: Éduquer pour l’ère planétaire, la pensée complexe comme méthode d’apprentissage dans l’erreur et l’incertitude humaine, Paris, Balland.
- 2003: Université, quel avenir ?, Paris, Éditions Charles Léopold Mayer.
- 2003: Les Enfants du ciel : entre vide, lumière, matière, Paris, Odile Jacob.
- 2004: Pour entrer dans le XXIe siècle, Paris, Le Seuil.
- 2005: Culture et Barbarie européennes, Paris, Bayard.
- 2006: Itinérance, Paris, Arléa.
- 2006: Le Monde moderne et la question juive, Paris, Le Seuil.
- 2006: Pour un nouvel imaginaire politique (with Mireille Delmas-Marty and René Passet)
- 2007: L'An I de l'ère écologique, Paris, Tallandier. (with Nicolas Hulot)
- 2007: Où va le monde ?, Paris, L'Herne.
- 2007: Vers l'abîme, Paris, L'Herne.
- 2008: Mon chemin, Paris, Fayard.
- 2008: Vive la politique ?, Grenoble, Forum Libération de Grenoble.
- 2009: Crises, Paris, CNRS.
- 2009: Au-delà du développement. Pour une politique de l'humanité? (as editor)
- 2009: La Pensée tourbillonnaire, Paris, Éditions Germina.
- 2009: Edwige, l'inséparable, Paris, Fayard.
- 2010: Pour et contre Marx, Paris, Temps présent.
- 2010: Ma gauche, Paris, Éditions François Bourin.
- 2010: Comment vivre en temps de crise ?, Paris, Bayard.
- 2011: La Voie : pour l'avenir de l'humanité, Paris, Fayard.
- 2011: Le philosophe indiscipliné, Paris, Le Monde, Hors série
- 2011: Rendre la terre habitable (with Peter Sloterdijk)
- 2011: Conversation pour l'avenir, Paris, L'Aube.
- 2011: Dialogue sur la connaissance : Entretiens avec des lycéens, Paris, L'Aube.
- 2011: Mes philosophes, Paris, Germina.
- 2011: Le Chemin de l'espérance, Paris, Fayard.
- 2012: La France est une et multiculturelle. Lettre aux citoyens de France, Paris, Fayard.
- 2012: Le Monde n'a plus de Temps à perdre (with members of the Collegium International)
- 2012: Dialogue sur la politique: la gauche et la crise (with François Hollande)
- 2013: Mon Paris, ma mémoire, Paris, Fayard.
- 2013: La rencontre improbable et nécessaire (with Sabah Abouessalam), Paris, Presses De La Renaissance.
- 2014: Notre Europe : Décomposition ou métamorphose, Paris, Fayard.
- 2014: Au péril des idées, Paris, Presses du Châtelet. (with Tariq Ramadan)
- 2014: Enseigner à vivre. Manifeste pour changer l’éducation, Paris, Actes Sud-Play Bac Éditions.
- 2015: Avant, pendant, après le 11 janvier, Paris, L'Aube.
- 2015: Impliquons-nous ! Dialogue pour le siècle, Paris, Actes Sud.
- 2015: Penser global : L'humain et son univers, Paris, Robert Laffont.
- 2015: Qui est Daech ? Paris, Éditions Philippe Rey. (with Régis Debray, Tahar Ben Jelloun, Michel Onfray, Olivier Weber, Jean-Christophe Rufin et Gilles Kepel)
- 2016: Pour l'esthétique, Paris, Robert Laffont.
- 2016: Pour une crisologie, Paris, L'Herne.
- 2016: Ecologiser l'Homme, Paris, Lemieux Éditeur.
- 2017: Connaissance, Ignorance, Mystère, Paris, Fayard.
- 2017: L’Île de Luna, Paris, Actes sud.
- 2017: L'Urgence et l'Essentiel, Paris, Éditions Don Quichotte. (with Tariq Ramadan)
- 2017: Le temps est venu de changer de civilisation, Paris, L'Aube.
- 2017: Ce que fut le communisme , Paris, L'Aube.
- 2017: Où est passé le peuple de gauche ?, Paris, L'Aube.
- 2018: Pour résister à la régression, Paris, L'Aube.
- 2018: Le Cinéma : Un art de la complexité, Paris, Nouveau Monde Éditions.
- 2018: Poésies du métropolitain, Paris, Descartes & Cie.
- 2019: La Fraternité, pourquoi ?, Paris, L'Aube.
- 2019: Chronique d'un été, Paris, L'Aube.
- 2019: Les souvenirs viennent à ma rencontre, Paris, Fayard.
- 2019: La Marseillaise , Paris, L'Aube
- 2020: Quelle école voulons-nous ? La Passion du savoir (with Jean-Michel Blanquer), Paris, Éditions Odile Jacob.
- 2020: Sur la crise : Pour une crisologie suivi de Où va le monde ?, Paris, Éditions Flammarion, coll. Champs.
- 2020: Changeons de voie : Les leçons du coronavirus (in collaboration with Sabah Abouessalam), Paris, Éditions Denoël.
- 2020: L'entrée dans l'ère écolgique, Paris, L'Aube.
- 2021: Frères d’âme, entretien avec Pierre Rabhi under questions of Denis Lafay. Paris, L'Aube.
- 2021: Leçons d’un siècle de vie, Paris, Édfitions Denoël.
- 2022: Réveillons-nous !, Paris, Éditions Denoël.
- 2022: The Challenge of Complexity: Essays by Edgar Morin, Edited by Amy Heath-Carpentier, Liverpool, Liverpool University Press.
- 2023: De guerre en guerre: De 1940 à l'Ukraine , La Tour-d'Aigues/impr. en Bulgarie, Éditions de l'Aube, 99 p. (ISBN 978-2-8159-5460-0).
- 2023: Encore un moment...: Textes personnels, politiques, sociologiques, philosophiques et littéraires, Paris, Denoël, (ISBN 978-22-07178-30-0)
- 2023: Mon ennemi c'est la haine (with Véronique Châter and Jean-Claude Perrier)
- 2024: Cheminer vers l'essentiel, Albin Michel
- 2025: Y a-t-il des leçons de l'Histoire?, Denoël

== Films ==
- 1961: Chronique d'un été, co-created with Jean Rouch.
- 1965: The Hour of Truth with Maurice Clavel et Henri Calef.
- 1966: Un certain regard. Le cinéma vérité, d'Edgar Morin, by Alexis Klémentieff and Jacques Prayer.
- 2004: Regard sur Edgar, entretiens thématiques accordés à Samuel Thomas.
- 2008: Edgar Morin, un penseur planétaire. A documentary about Morin by Jeanne Mascolo de Filippis, coll. Empreintes.
- 2009: Nous resterons sur Terre, environmental film created by Olivier Bourgeois et Pierre Barougier.
- 2010: Regards sur le sport [under the direction of Benjamin Pichery and François L’Yvonnet), Paris, Le Pommier / INSEP ; Réédition revue et augmentée : Le sport porte en lui le tout de la société, Paris, Cherche-Midi / INSEP 2020, (ISBN 978-2749165134))
- 2014: Edgar Morin, chronique d'un regard. Created by Céline Gailleurd et Olivier Bohler.
- 2017: Enseignez à vivre ! – Edgar Morin et l’éducation innovante, by Abraham Ségal.

== Conferences ==
- 2005, "Restricted complexity, general complexity".

== See also ==
- Autopoiesis
- Systems thinking
