= Edgar Morin Centre =

French research and teaching centre

Coordinates: 48°52′41.75″N 2°19′38.35″E

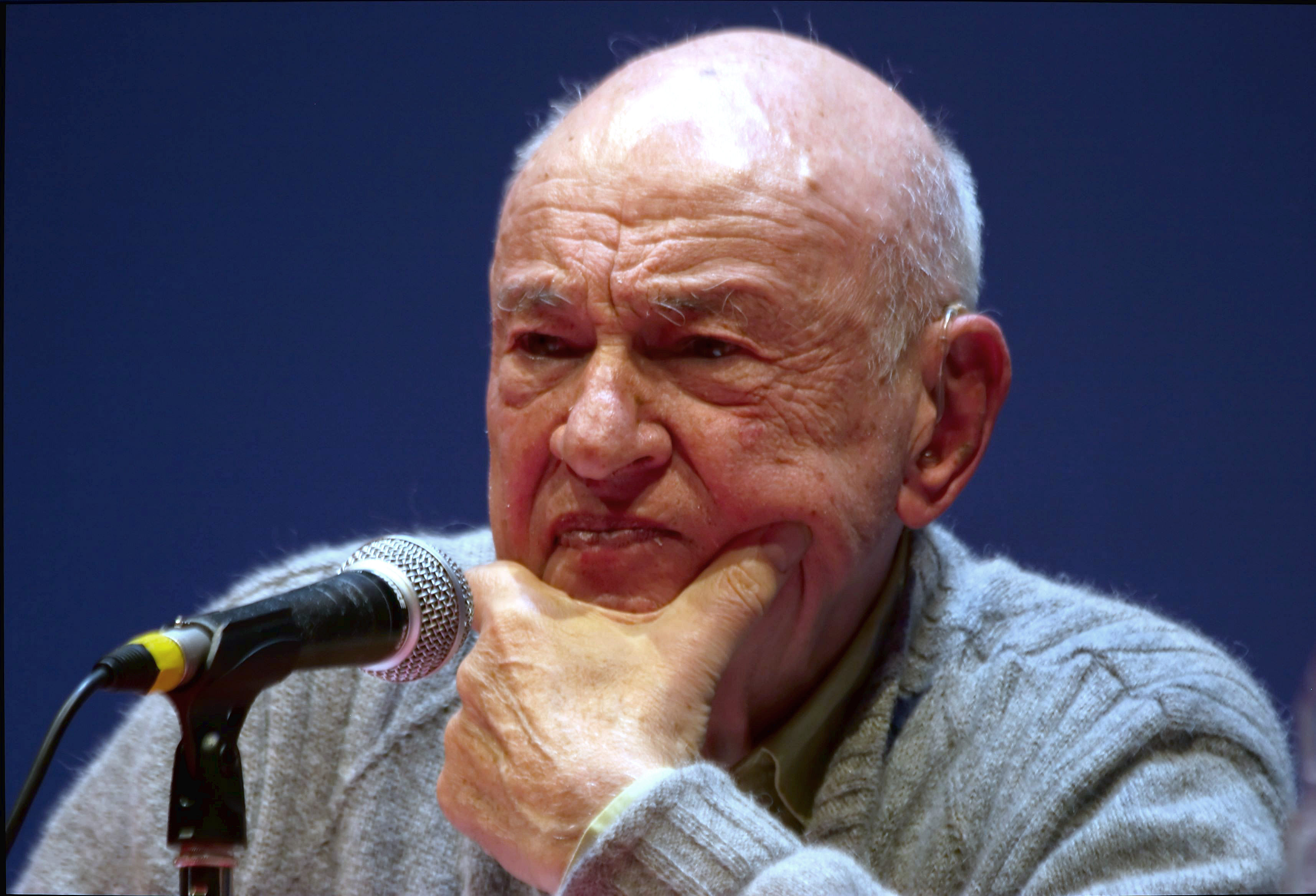
Philosopher and social scientist Edgar Morin

The Edgar Morin Centre (French: Centre Edgar-Morin), formerly CETSAH (Centre d'Études Transdisciplinaires, Sociologie, Anthropologie, Histoire), is a graduate teaching and research unit of the École des Hautes Études en Sciences Sociales (EHESS) and of the French Centre National de la Recherche Scientifique (Paris). The centre, named after social theorist and intellectual Edgar Morin, is part of the Institut Interdisciplinaire d'Anthropologie du Contemporain (Interdisciplinary Institute of Contemporary Anthropology, known as IIAC).

== History ==
The Edgar Morin Centre (French: Centre Edgar-Morin) was established in 1960 at the École Pratique des Hautes Études by French sociologist Georges Friedmann, who was founding director and worked in close collaboration with Edgar Morian and Roland Barthes. Initially named Centre d'études de communications de masse (CECMAS) ("Centre for the Study of Mass Communications"), it evolved into CETSAH in 1973. In 2007 it was given its current name, as a tribute to Edgar Morin.

Sociologist and philosopher Alain Ehrenberg started his career as a researcher at the centre.

Under the guidance and influence of Morin and Barthes, over the years the centre has produced research in such fields as sociology, cultural anthropology, semiotics, media studies, complexity studies, philosophy, history, political science, and social psychology.

== Organisation ==
The Edgar Morin Centre is part of the Interdisciplinary Institute for the Anthropology of Contemporary Societies (IIAC), which is a joint venture of EHESS and CNRS.

The Centre is hosted by EHESS, whose advanced programs are intended to lead to research careers. The main topics include: history, social psychology, sociology, ethnography, media studies, field methodologies, epistemology, environmental sciences.

== Publications ==
Since 1961, the Centre has been publishing the transdisciplinary journal Communications, which has regularly produced thematic issues featuring articles by prominent international intellectuals, social theorists and scientists, including Roland Barthes, Umberto Eco, Moses Finley, Noam Chomsky, Tzvetan Todorov, Bill Viola, Paul Virilio, Raymond Boudon, and Jacques Le Goff.
