= Alain Ehrenberg =

French sociologist

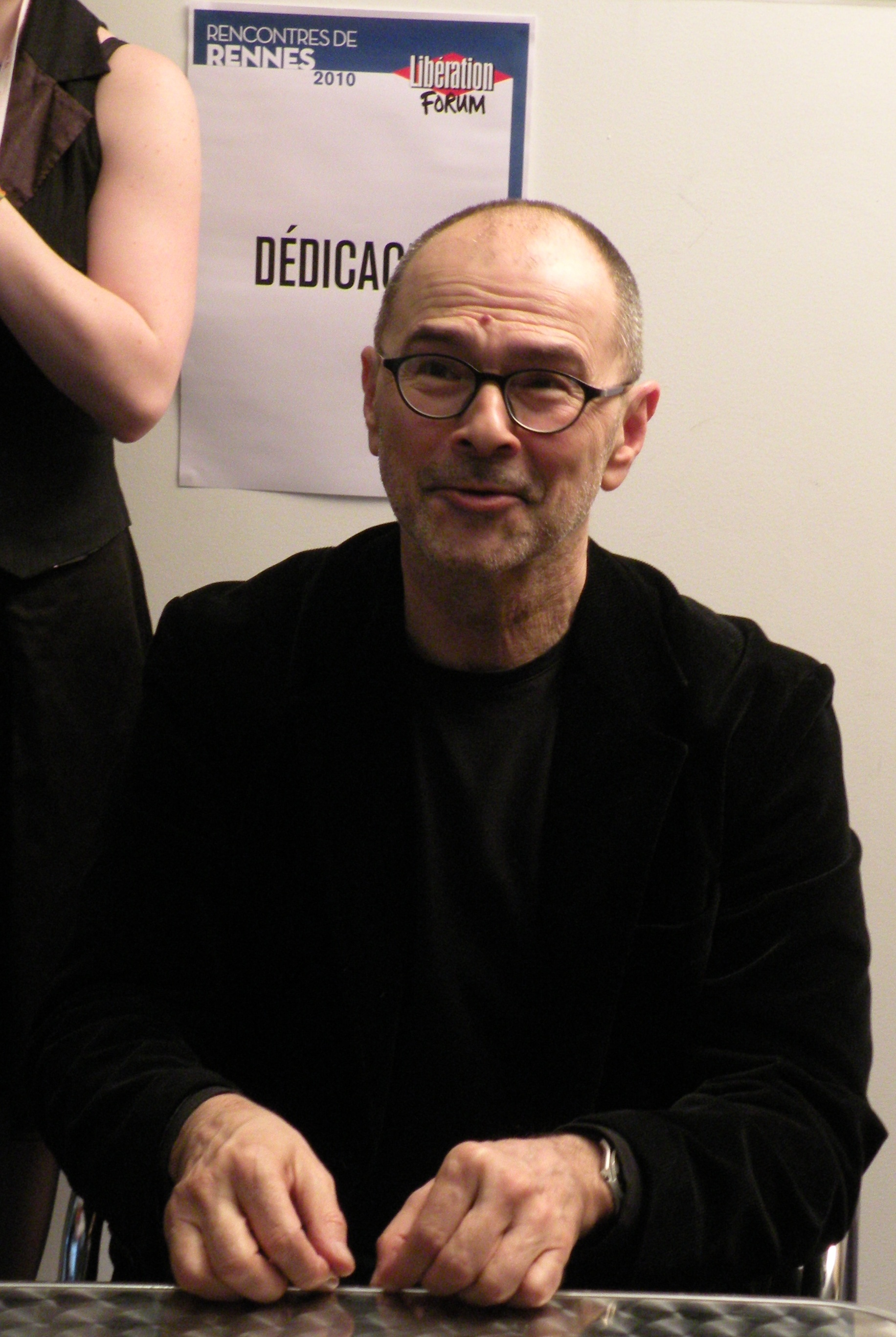
- At Forum Libération 2010 in Rennes.
- Born: 1950 (age 75–76); Paris, France
- Occupation: Sociologist

Alain Ehrenberg (born 1950) is a French sociologist, known for his major work on clinical depression, The Weariness of the Self. His work focuses on the culture of individualism in modern times, and its relationship to mental health. As of 2023 he is research director at the Centre National de Recherche Scientifique (CNRS) in Paris.

== Early life and education ==
Ehrenberg was born in Paris, France, in 1950.

In 1968 he achieved his Baccalauréat. In 1972 earned Master of Science in management at Université Paris IX (Dauphine).

Moving to Université Paris X at Nanterre, he attained further degrees in sociology and economics there. His PhD thesis published in 1978 at Nanterre (Thèse de 3e cycle en sociologie), was a sociological study called Archangels, warriors, military men and sportsmen. Essay on the education of the strong man.

He wrote a second sociology thesis in 1991 (Thèse en sociologie (nouveau régime)) at Université Paris VII (Jussieu Campus).

In 1992, he was given accreditation to supervise research at the École des hautes études en sciences sociales.

== Career ==
After writing his PhD thesis in 1978, Ehrenberg became interested in the anxieties of the individual in modern society, faced with the need for achievement and autonomy and the loss of social signposts and support systems.

After being a researcher at the Edgar Morin Centre at the School for Advanced Studies in the Social Sciences in Paris, in 1994 Ehrenberg founded and co-directed the research group "Psychotropics, Politics, Society" (Centre de recherche Psychotropes, Santé mentale, Société, aka CESAMES). This is a joint research unit of the University of Paris 5 (Descartes) and the Centre national de la recherche scientifique (CNRS - National Centre for Scientific Research), where Ehrenberg is professor of sociology. Since 2001, he has worked with a government research institute for human health.

Ehrenberg's work focuses on the emphasis of individualism in contemporary culture, linking this to recent work on depression, mental health, and psycho-analysis.

=== La Fatigue d'être soi ===
In 1998 he published a major work on clinical depression, La Fatigue d'être soi, which was translated into six languages, including English (The Weariness of the Self, 2009). In this work, which Rasmus Johnsen, assistant professor at Copenhagen Business School, describes as having "a reputation that makes it worthy of a position as a must-read for anyone with an interest in social philosophy", Ehrenberg argues that depression not simply a disease, and (as paraphrased by Johnsen), has risen "from its status as a secondary phenomenon often associated with other mental illnesses to a challenge that applies to everyone, [and] is a symptom, not necessarily of an increased social pressure on the subject, but of a fundamental transformation in the way individuals understand themselves". In 2015, American political philosopher and writer Matthew Crawford listed this work as one of his six favourite books. He writes that, according to Eherenberg, "depression has replaced guilt as our defining psychic affliction", arising from a sense of inadequacy to perform to our full potential, which we are driven to achieve by modern western culture.

== Current position ==
As of 2023 Ehrenberg is a director of research at the CNRS and of Cesames.

== Other activities ==
From 1974 to 1977, Ehrenberg taught karate. He has also been a member of many scientific committees and groups focused on mental health, substance abuse, and neuroscience.

== Selected works ==
- Archangels, warriors, military men and sportsmen. Essay on the education of the strong man (PhD thesis, 1978). Supervised by Eugène Enriquez, submitted at the Université Paris X
- (In collaboration with Jean-Pierre and Patrick Zylberman Yahi) Archangels, warriors, sportsmen and small perverse genesis of competitive sports and fate of physical violence: Policy Analysis of the promoters of the French and Japanese karate, implantation to the institution, 1953-1976, Organizing Committee for applied research on economic and social development, 1977–1980
- The Military Corps: Politics and Pedagogy in a Democracy, Aubier-Montaigne, 1983
- Le culte de la performance (The Cult of Achievement), Calmann-Lévy, Paris, 1991
- L'individu incertain (The Uncertain Individual), Calmann-Lévy, Paris, 1995
- La fatigue d'être soi : dépression et société. 1998., in English:
  - Ehrenberg, Alain (2010). Weariness of the Self: Diagnosing the History of Depression in the Contemporary Age. McGill-Queen's University Press. ISBN 978-0-7735-3625-8. JSTOR j.cttq48ft.
- La société du malaise (The Uneasy Society), Odile Jacob, Paris, 2010
- "What we talk about when we talk about mental health. Toward and anthropology of adversity in individualistic society". In: S. Neckel, A. K. Schafner, G. Wagner. Burnout, Fatigue, Exhaustion: An interdisciplinary Perspective on a Modern Affliction, Palgrave McMillan, 2017, p. 153-172.
- E. Nakamura, M. Planche, A. Ehrenberg. "The social aspects in the identification of children's mental health problems in two health services in Paris, France". Interfaces, 22 (65), 2018, p. 411-422.
- La Mécanique des passions: Cerveau, comportement, société Odile Jacob, 2018, also published in Italian and German. In English:
  - The Mechanics of Passion: Brain, Behaviour, and Society. McGill-Queen's University Press. 2020. ISBN 978-0-2280-0443-1.
- Feuerhahn, Wolf; Mandressi, Rafael; Ehrenberg, Alain; Vidal, Fernando (15 December 2019). "Les neurosciences sociales : un phénomène de société". Revue d'histoire des sciences humaines (35). OpenEdition: 235–258. doi:10.4000/rhsh.4296. ISSN 1622-468X.

== In film ==
- Nervousness in civilization. From the cult of performance to psychic collapse, University of All Knowledges, SFRS, Vanves, 2001, 76' (DVD)
