= Jean-Marie Guéhenno =

French diplomat

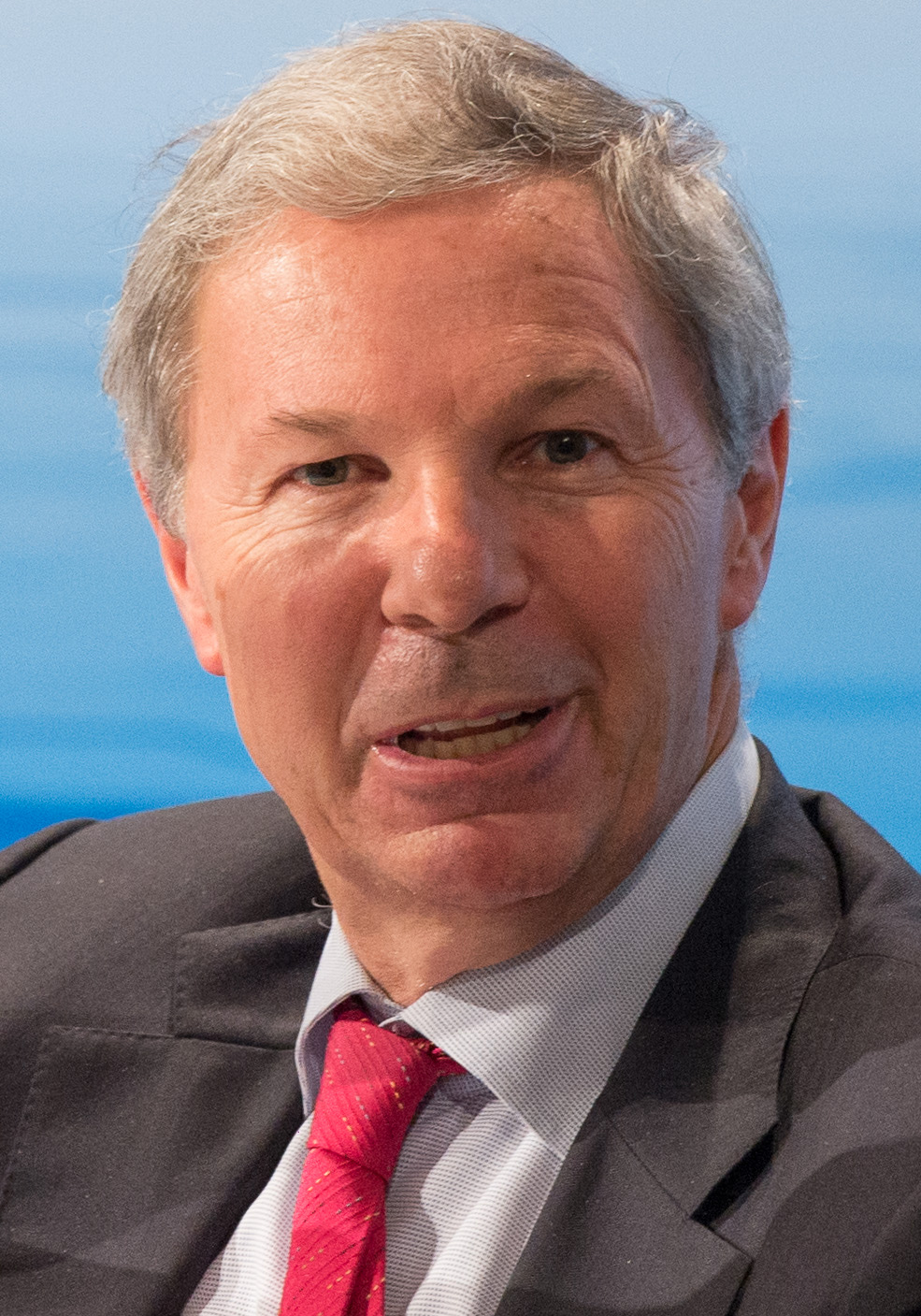
- Guéhenno in 2015

Under-Secretary-General for Peacekeeping Operations
- In office 1 October 2000 – 30 June 2008
- Appointed by: Kofi Annan
- Preceded by: Bernard Miyet
- Succeeded by: Alain Le Roy

Personal details
- Born: 30 October 1949 (age 76) Paris, France

Jean-Marie Guéhenno (French: [ʒɑ̃maʁi ɡeɛno]; born 30 October 1949) is a former French diplomat who served as the United Nations' Under-Secretary-General for Peacekeeping Operations from 2000 to August 2008.

== Early life and education ==
Guéhenno is the son of the French teacher, editor and writer Jean Guéhenno, author of the Occupation memoir Journal des Années Noires and a biography of Jean-Jacques Rousseau, among other works. His mother, Annie Guéhenno, was a member of the Resistance during the Second World War and a writer.

Guéhenno attended the École Normale Supérieure, before going to the École Nationale d'Administration. He was then a member of the Cour des Comptes in Paris. He has also worked in international relations and diplomacy, directing the French Policy Planning Staff from 1989 to 1993, chairing the Institut des hautes études de défense nationale from 1998 to 2000 and working with the Ministry of Foreign Affairs in France before he joined the UN.

== Career ==
Guéhenno served as United Nations Under-Secretary-General for Peacekeeping Operations from 2000 to 2008. He led the largest expansion of peacekeeping in the history of the UN, overseeing approximately 130,000 staff, on 18 missions.

Guéhenno was elected Chairman of the Henri Dunant Centre for Humanitarian Dialogue (HD) board at the end of 2010. From March to July 2012, he temporarily stood down from the board to serve as Deputy Joint Special Envoy of the United Nations and the League of Arab States on Syria. He resumed his role as a Member and Chairman of the HD Centre Board in November 2012.

In 2012–13, Guéhenno headed President François Hollande's review of French defense and security policies.

Guéhenno was director of the Center for International Conflict Resolution at Columbia University's School of International and Public Affairs. He also served as associate director of the Arnold A. Saltzman Institute of War and Peace Studies at SIPA and directed the School's International Conflict Resolution specialization.

Guéhenno was named president and CEO of International Crisis Group in August 2014, succeeding Louise Arbour.

In 2021, Guéhenno returned to Columbia University as the inaugural Kent Visiting professor of Conflict Resolution. He is also a non-resident senior fellow at the Brookings Institution.

== Other activities ==
- Carnegie Corporation of New York, Member of the Board of Trustees (since 2020)
- Institute of Advanced Studies in National Defence (IHEDN), Chair of the Scientific Council (since 2020)
- Brookings Institution, Distinguished Fellow
- European Council on Foreign Relations (ECFR), Member
- World Economic Forum (WEF), Member of the Global Future Council on the Future of International Security
- World Economic Forum (WEF), Member of the Europe Policy Group (since 2017)

== Recognition ==
Guéhenno is an officer of the Légion d'honneur and a commander of the Bundesverdienstkreuz. .

== Personal life ==
Guéhenno is married and has one daughter.

== Publications ==
Guéhenno has published articles in many newspapers and magazines, including "The Impact of Globalisation on Strategy" in the International Institute for Strategic Studies' Survival, and "Globalisation and the International System" in the Journal of Democracy, as well as articles or chapters in Internationale Politik, Prospect, Paradoxes of European Foreign Policy, and Strategic Analysis. He is the author of The End of Democracy (1993, in French) and The Fog of Peace (2015).

== Bibliography ==
- La fin de la démocratie Paris, Flammarion, 1993; re-edited by Champs in 1999, ISBN 2-08-081322-6; published in English as The End of the Nation-State, Minneapolis, University of Minnesota Press, 2000, 160 pages, ISBN 0816626618
- L'avenir de la liberté - La démocratie dans la mondialisation ("The Future of Freedom - Democracy in Globalisation"), Paris, Flammarion, 1999, 222 pages, ISBN 2-08-211579-8
- Jocelyn Coulon, Jean-Marie Guéhenno, Lucien Manokou, Catherine Délice, Guide du maintien de la paix, Paris, Athéna éditions, 2006, 294 pages, ISBN 2-922865-37-1
- The Fog of Peace New York, Brookings, 2015, 331 pages, ISBN 0815726368
