= Contingent owned equipment =

Contingent Owned Equipment (COE) is the equipment owned and brought by United Nations member states to peacekeeping missions. The UN financially reimburses member states for their contributions of COE, and also for the self sustainment services they provide to contingents. This method of reimbursement is commonly referred to as the “COE System". UN staff in peacekeeping missions serve as COE inspectors, verifying that the member states' equipment and the services they provide meet the standards required for reimbursement.

The COE System was approved by the United Nations General Assembly in 1996 to simplify the means by which countries are reimbursed for providing equipment, self sustainment services, and personnel to peacekeeping missions.

== The Memorandum of Understanding ==
The Memorandum of Understanding (MOU) is the contract signed by representatives of the Department of Peacekeeping Operations (DPKO) and the contributing country's permanent mission to the UN which specifies the number of personnel and exact amount and type of equipment and self-sustainment services which the contributing country will be expected to provide to the peacekeeping mission and for which it will be financially reimbursed. Equipment under MOU ranges from crew served machine guns, metal detectors, and other handheld equipment, to APCs, heavy engineering equipment, cargo/utility vehicles, and generators and containers. Self-sustainment services include catering, communications, medical, EOD, accommodation, field defense, observation, and so on - all of the services required to enable a formed military or police unit to sustain itself and function in the field.

Rates of reimbursement are generic, based on “fair market value” as determined by working groups of the General Assembly. A separate MOU is written for each formed military or police unit to be deployed to a peacekeeping mission. Currently there are over 300 MOU covering units deployed to 11 peacekeeping missions, representing over 2 billion US dollars in troop, equipment, and self-sustainment costs annually.

== See also ==
- Letters of Assist
