= Rachad Ahmed Saleh Farah =

Djiboutian diplomat (born 1950)

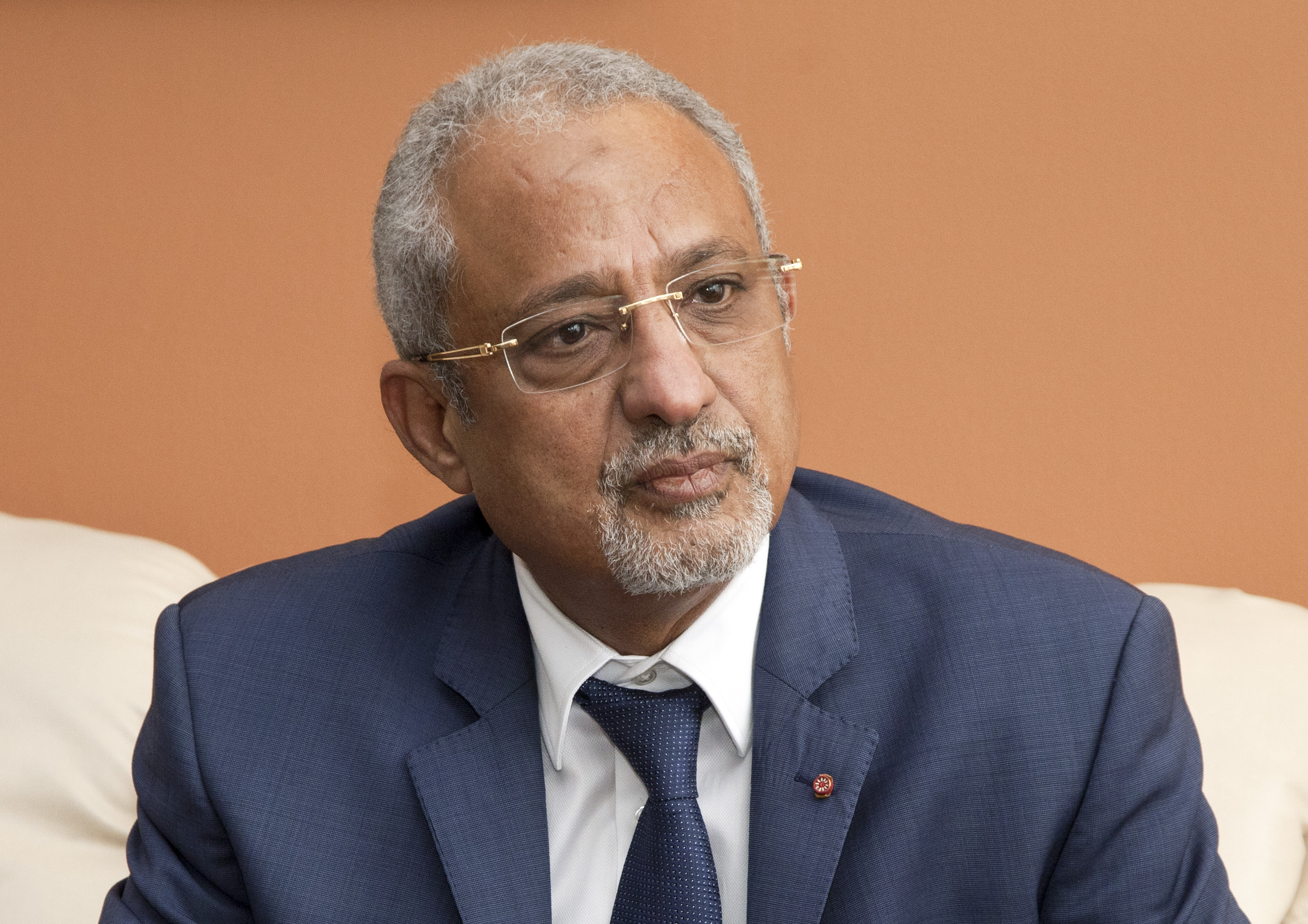
Rachad Farah

Rachad Ahmed Saleh Farah (Arabic: رشاد احمد صالح فرح, born in 1950) is a Djiboutian diplomat, ambassador to several countries, and the Permanent Representative of Djibouti to UNESCO.

== Career ==
He was the Ambassador of Djibouti to Japan from 1989 to 2004, and moreover, non resident ambassador to China, Singapore, the Philippines, Malaysia, India, Thailand and Australia. When he was the Ambassador-Designate in Tokyo still without the presentation of his credentials to Emperor Hirohito, this 124th Emperor of Japan who ruled for over 60 years died on January 7, 1989, and his imperial funeral was held on the next month. On February 24, Farah attended the Rites of Imperial Funeral with Barkat Gourad Hamadou, Prime Minister and Dileita Mohamed Dileita, Deputy Chief of Protocol and later Prime Minister.

After his departure from the Asia-Pacific region, since 2004, he has been the Ambassador of Djibouti to France, and also been non resident ambassador to United Kingdom, Italy, Tunisia, Algeria, Portugal, Spain, Monaco and Iceland.

In 2013 Mr. Rachad FARAH was nominated as a candidate for the Director-General of UNESCO.

== See also ==
- Djibouti–Japan relations
- Djibouti-China relations
