= Mireille Delmas-Marty =

French lawyer and academic (1941–2022)

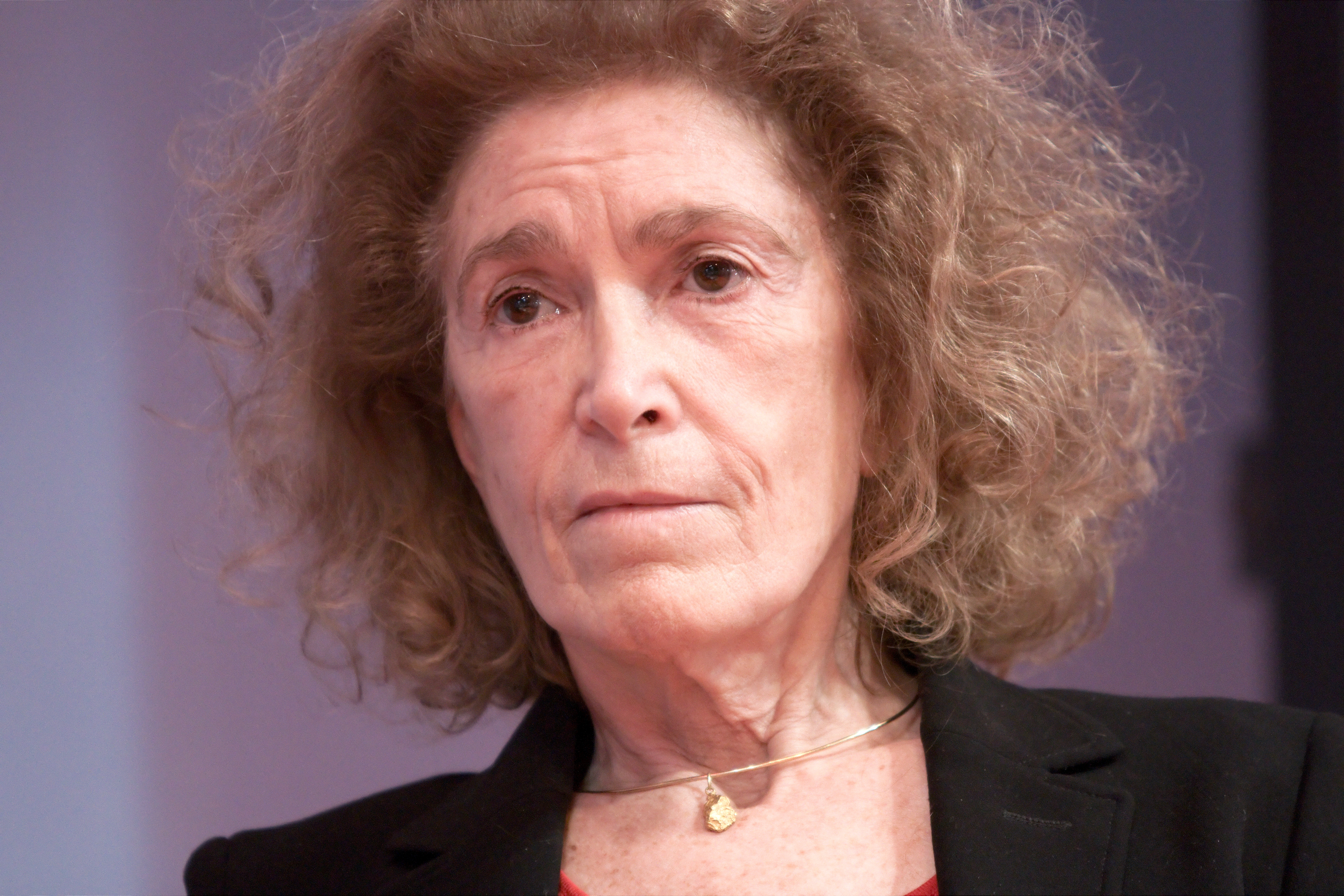
- Delmas-Marty in 2010
- Born: 10 May 1941; Paris, France
- Died: 12 February 2022 (aged 80); Saint-Germain-Laval, Loire, France
- Occupation: Jurist

Mireille Delmas-Marty (10 May 1941 – 12 February 2022) was a French jurist, honorary professor at the Collège de France, and a member of the Academy of Moral and Political Sciences. She was a member of numerous legislative and constitutional commissions, such as the member of the Criminal Code Reform Commission, president of the commission "Criminal Justice and Human Rights", coordinator of the Committee of Experts of the European Union on the project "Corpus Juris", and chairman of the Supervisory Committee of the European Anti-Fraud Office. She was also one of the 25 leading figures on the Information and Democracy Commission launched by Reporters Without Borders.

In 2021 she was elected to the American Philosophical Society. She died in Saint-Germain-Laval, Loire on 12 February 2022, at the age of 80.
