= Institut Interdisciplinaire d'Anthropologie du Contemporain =

French research center

Coordinates: 48.8502°N 2.3268°E

Institut interdisciplinaire d'anthropologie du contemporain (IIAC, stylised iiac; in English: Interdisciplinary Institute of Contemporary Anthropology) is a French anthropological research centre institutionally linked to the EHESS and to the CNRS.

The centre is composed of four main research units:

- Edgar Morin Centre
- Laboratoire d'anthropologie et d'histoire de l'institution de la culture
- Laboratoire d'anthropologie des institutions et des organisations sociales
- Anthropologie de l'écriture

In 2022, it became the laboratoire d'anthropologie politique (LAP).

== See also ==
- Centre national de la recherche scientifique (CNRS)
- École des hautes études en sciences sociales (EHESS)
